= Gallery of city flags in Europe =

This page lists the city flags in Europe. It is a part of the Lists of city flags, which is split into continents due to its size.

== Northern Europe ==
=== Denmark ===
Copenhagen

==== Faroe Islands ====
Tórshavn

==== Greenland ====
Aasiaat

Ilulissat

Ittoqqortoormiit

Nuuk

Qaqortoq

=== Estonia ===
==== Cities and towns ====
Kärdla

Keila

Kohtla-Järve

Loksa

Maardu

Narva

Nõmme

Pärnu

Rakvere

Sillamäe

Tallinn (details)

Tartu

Viljandi

Võru

=== Finland ===
Föglö

Hamina

Heinola

Helsinki

Hyvinkää

Iisalmi

Jakobstad

Joensuu

Kimitoön

Kokkola

Lieksa

Loviisa

Oulu

Pori

Pyhäjoki

Pyhäranta

Raseborg

Raisio

Rauma

Rovaniemi

Saarijärvi

Tampere

Turku

Vaasa

Vantaa

Vårdö

=== Iceland ===
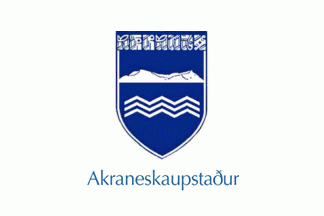
Akranes

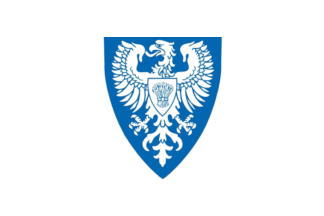
Akureyri

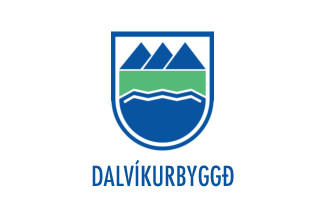
Dalvík

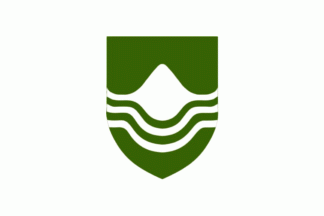
Garðabær

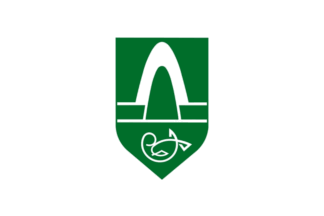
Kópavogur

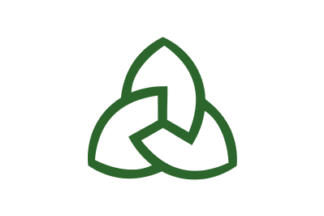
Mosfellsbær

Reykjavík

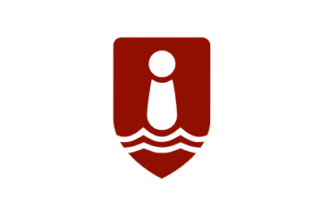
Seltjarnarnes

=== Latvia ===
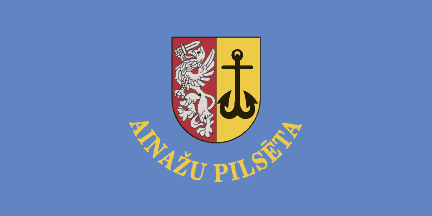
Ainaži

Aizkraukle

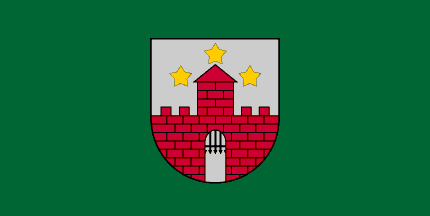
Aizpute

Aloja

Alūksne

Baloži

Balvi

Bauska

Brocēni

Cēsis

Dagda

Daugavpils

Dobele

Durbe

Gulbene

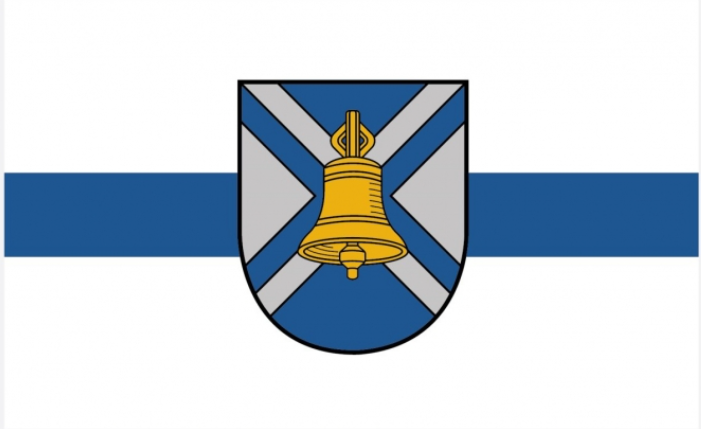
Iecava

Ikšķile

Jēkabpils

Jelgava

Jūrmala

Kalnciems (former city)

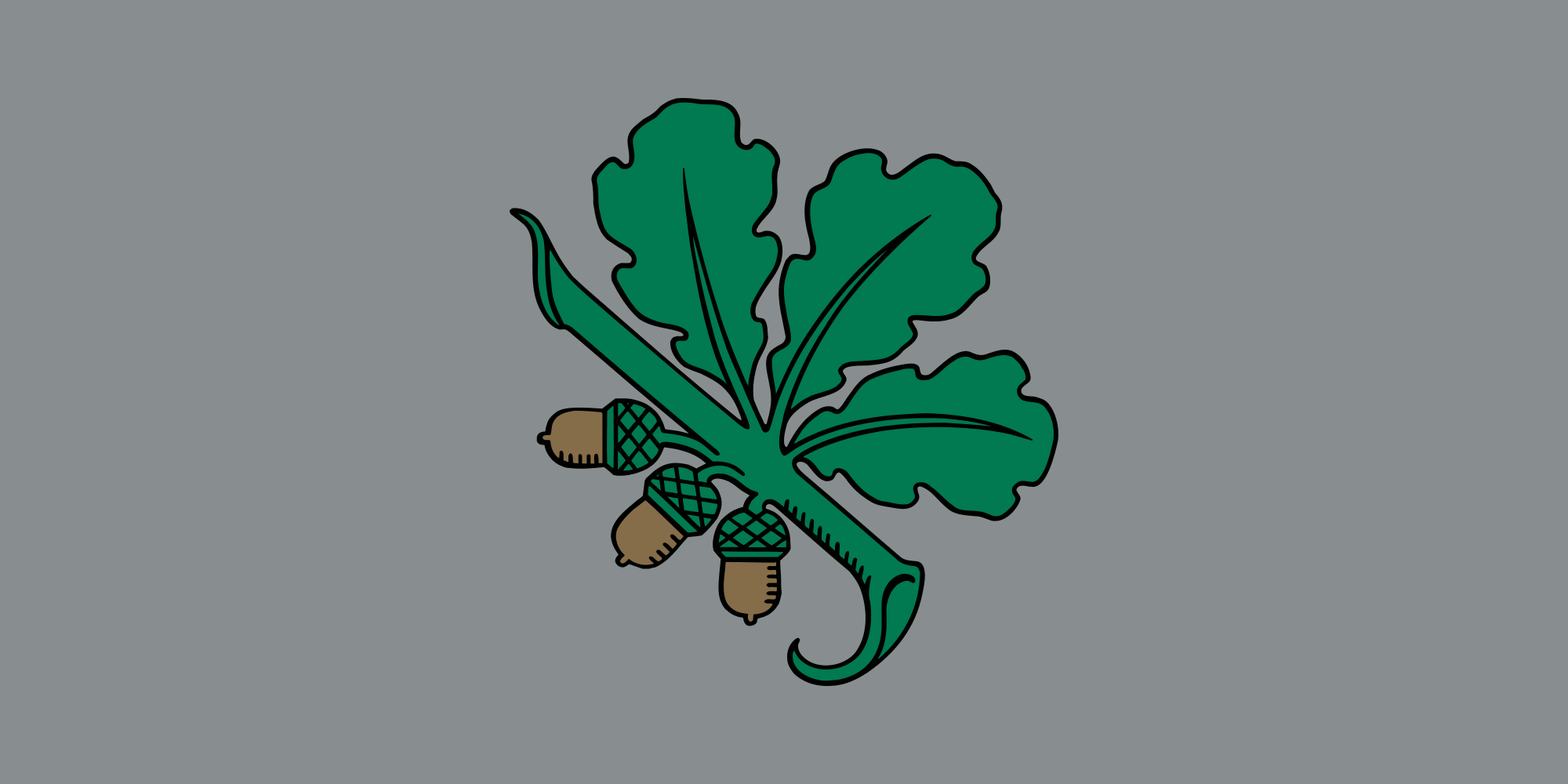
Kandava

Kuldīga

Liepāja

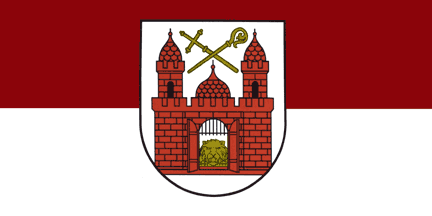
Limbaži

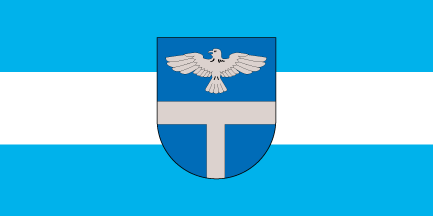
Līvāni

Lubāna

Madona

Ogre

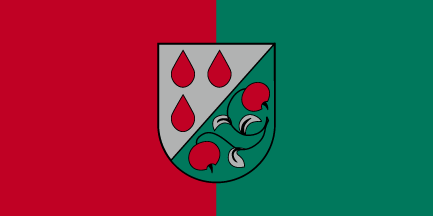
Olaine

Pāvilosta

Piltene

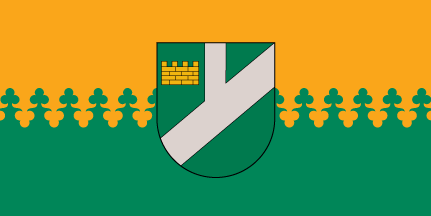
Pļaviņas

Priekule

Rēzekne

Riga (details)

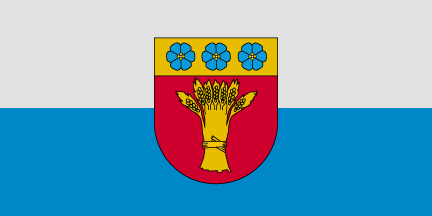
Rūjiena

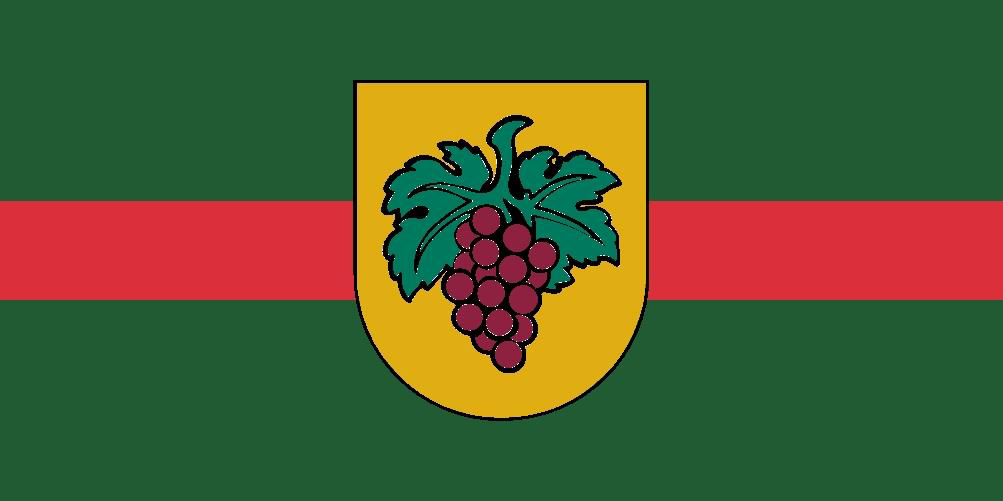
Sabile

Salacgrīva

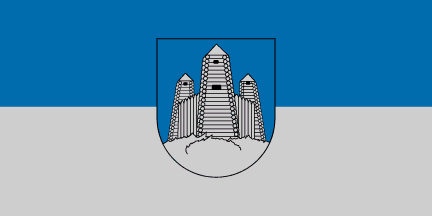
Saldus

Saulkrasti

Sigulda

Skrunda

Smiltene

Staicele

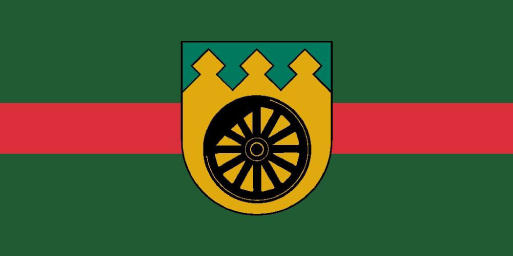
Stende

Talsi

Tukums

Valdemārpils

Valka

Valmiera

Ventspils

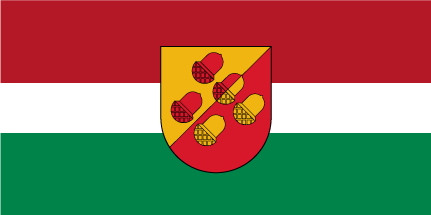
Viesīte

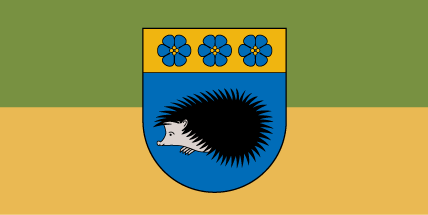
Viļaka

Viļāni

==== Historical ====
Flag of Riga after it joins the Hanseatic League (1282)

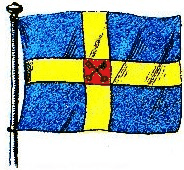
Flag of Riga given by the Swedish King

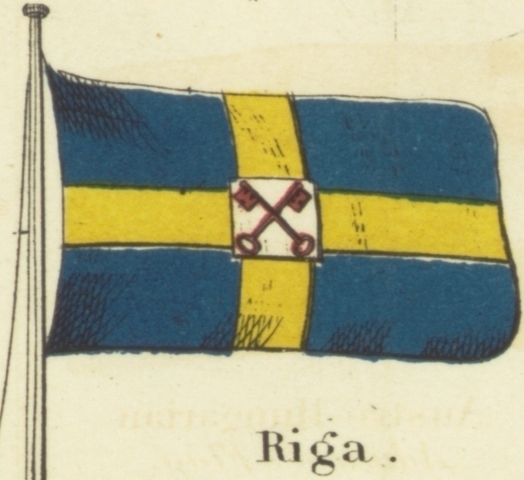
Flag of Riga given by the Swedish King variant, according to the Johnson's new chart of national emblems, 1868.

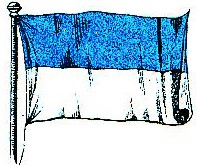
Early design of the current flag of Riga in the 17th century, with no coat of arms

Flag of Riga from 1917 until the 1920s

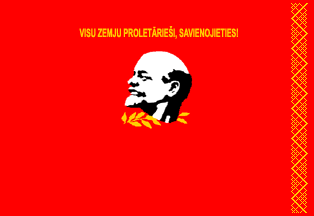
Obverse side of the flag of Riga during the Soviet Era

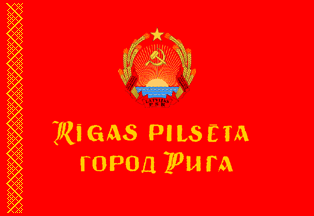
Reverse side of the flag of Riga during the Soviet Era

=== Lithuania ===
Akmenė

Alytus

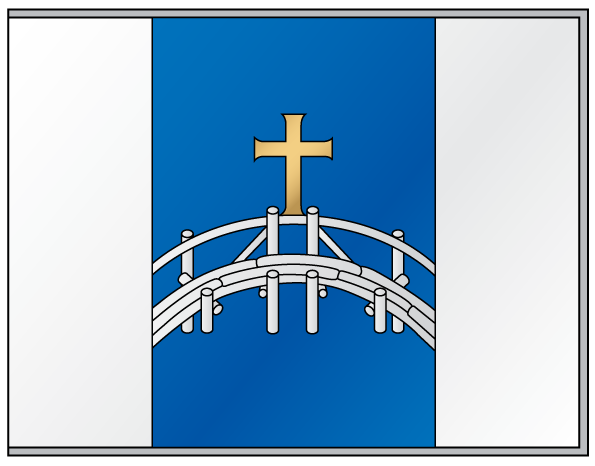
Antalieptė

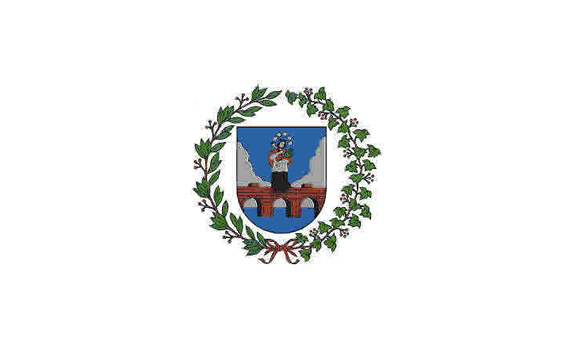
Anykščiai

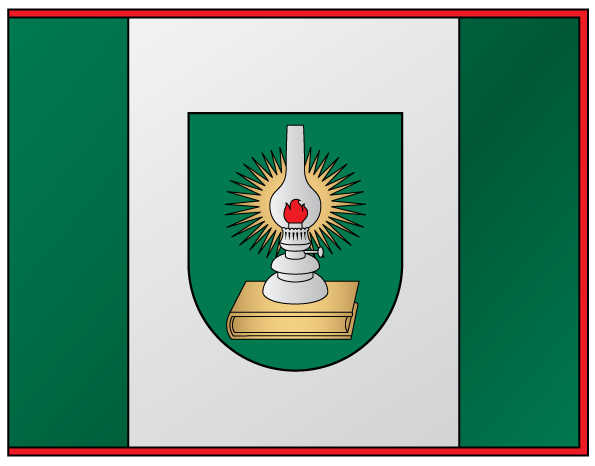
Barzdai

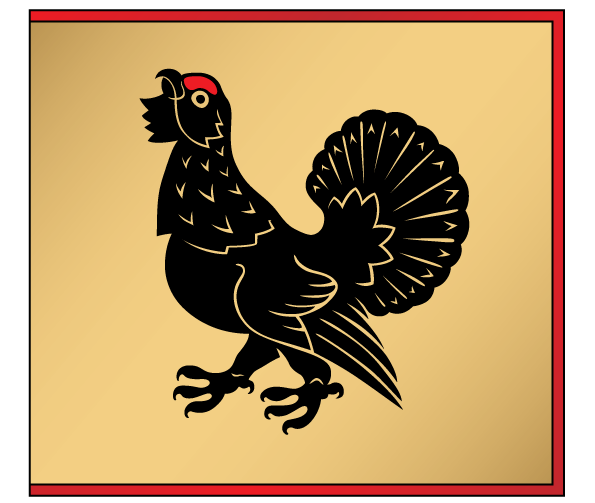
Bubiai

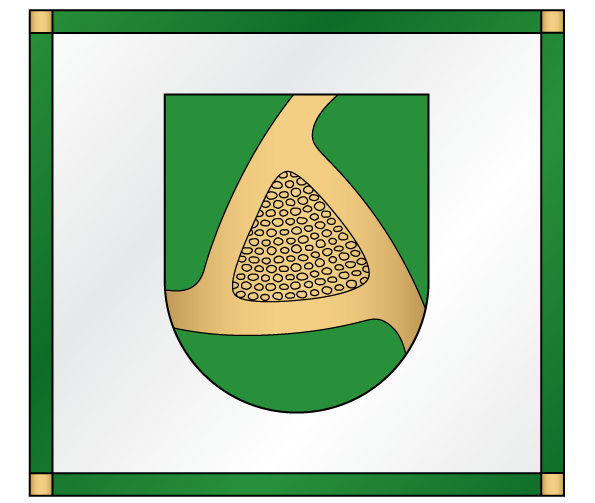
Butrimonys

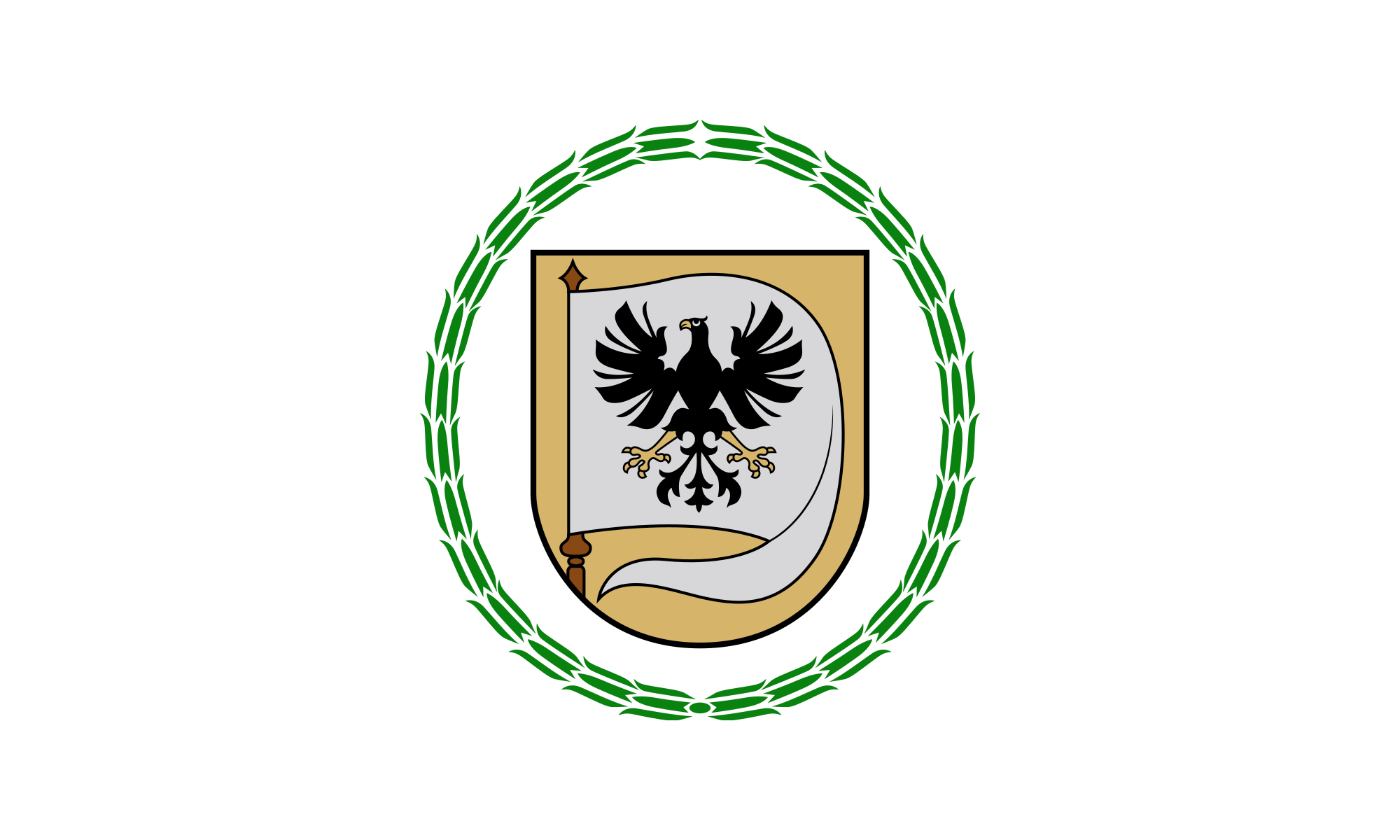
Biržai

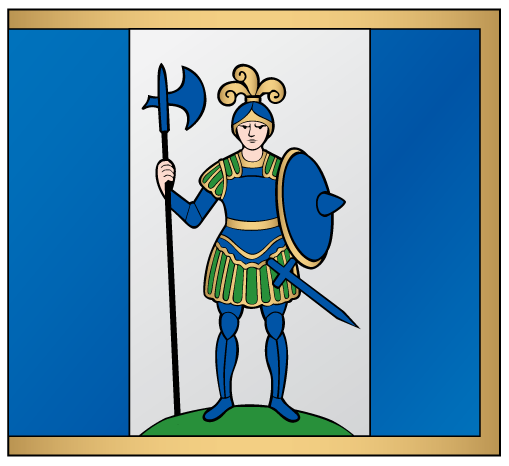
Daugai

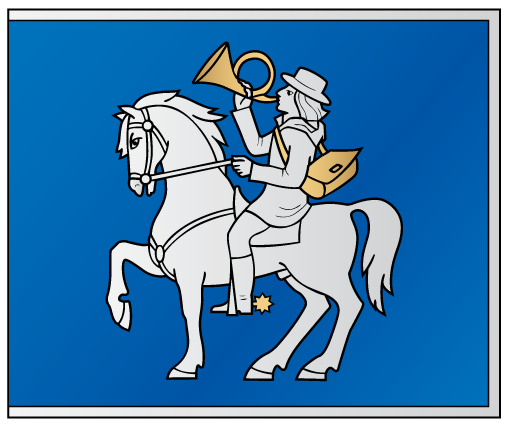
Daugailiai

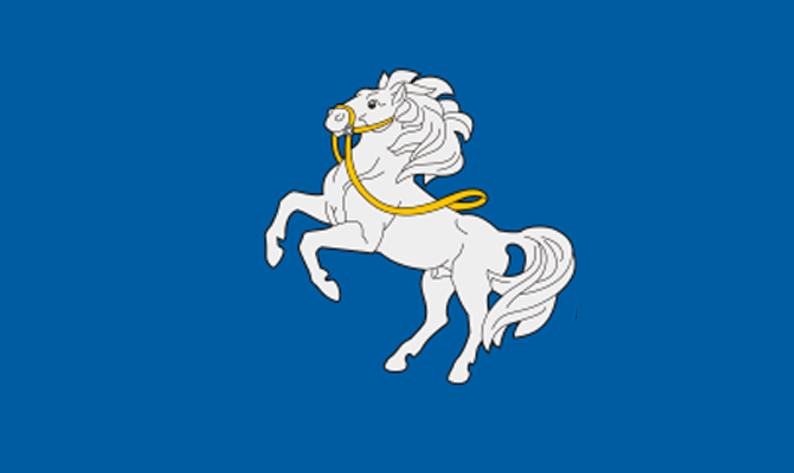
Debeikiai

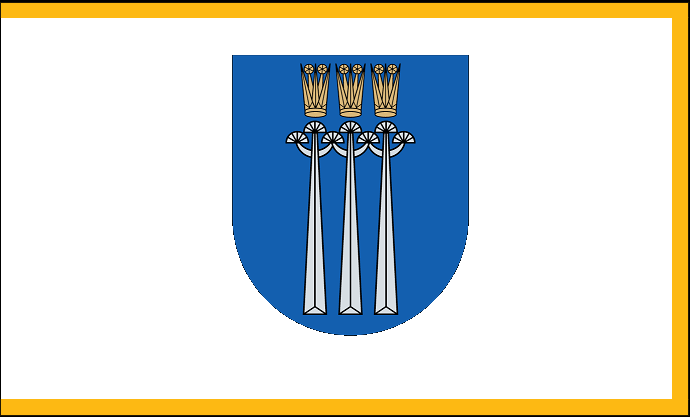
Druskininkai

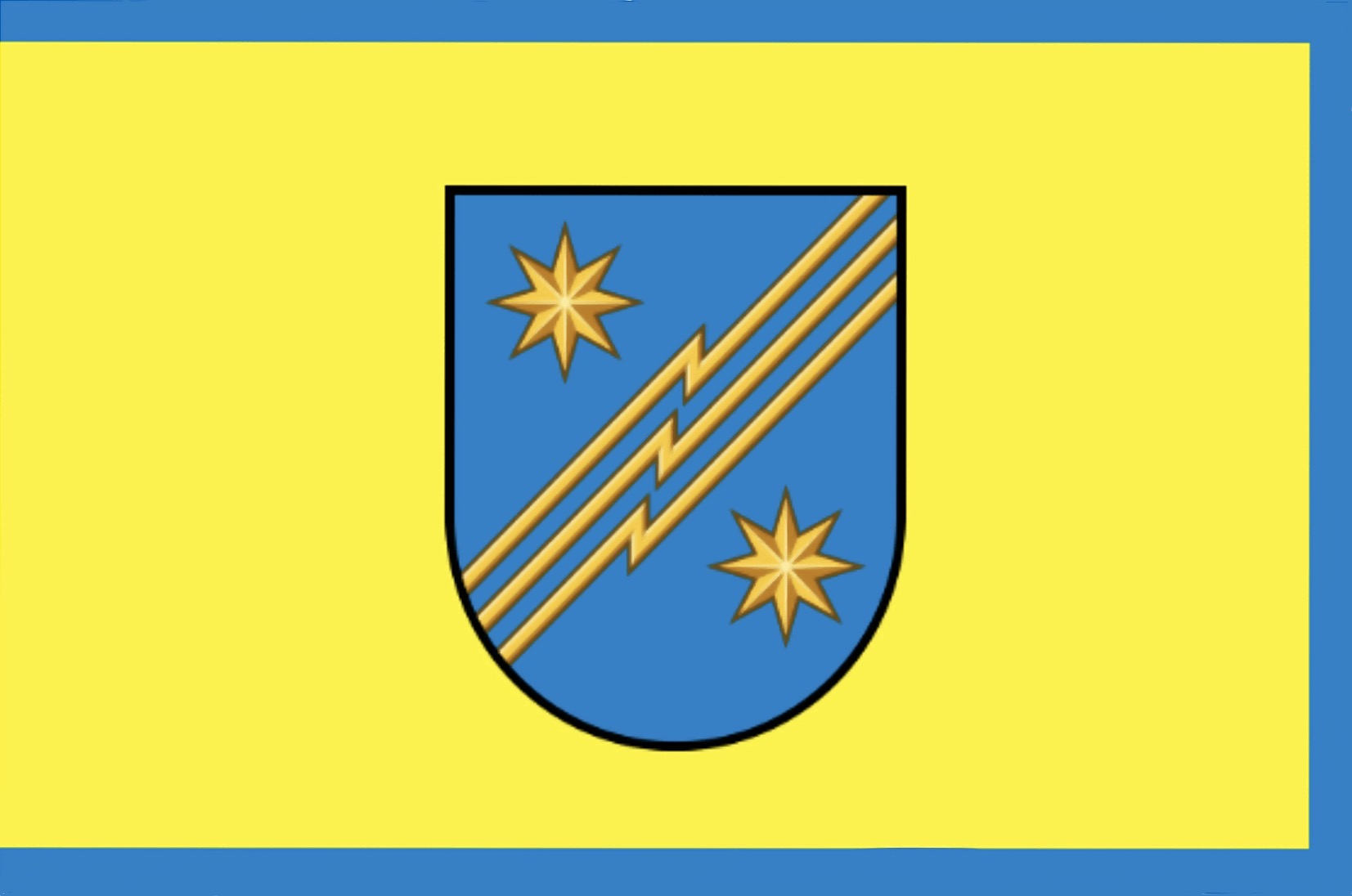
Elektrėnai

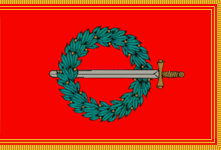
Gargždai

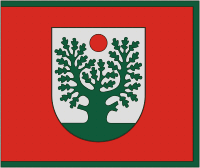
Gaurė

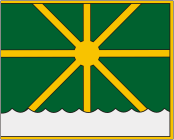
Gelgaudiškis

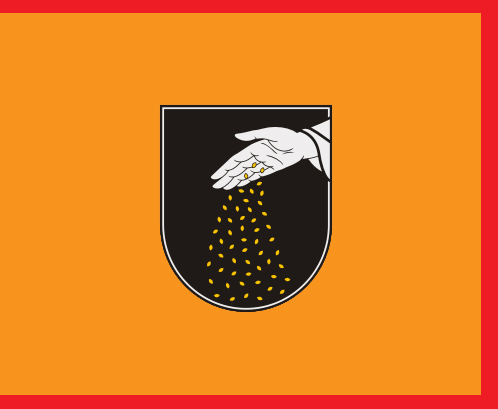
Ginkūnai

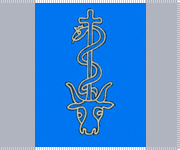
Grigiškės

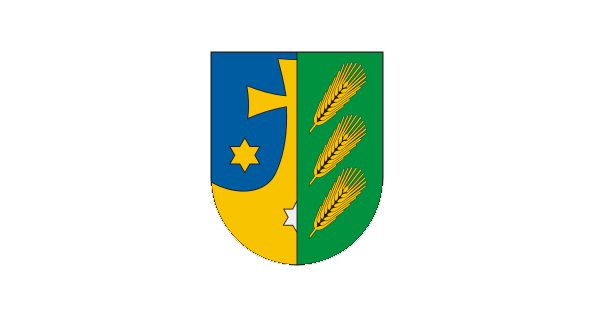
Griškabūdis

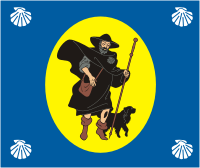
Gruzdžiai

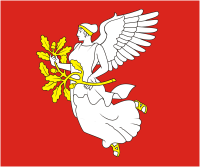
Jieznas

Jonava

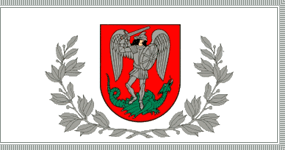
Joniškis

Juodkrantė

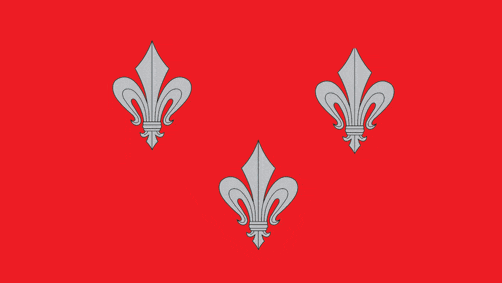
Jurbarkas (details)

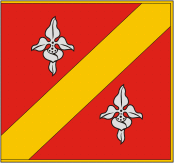
Kairiai

Kaunas

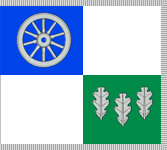
Kelmė

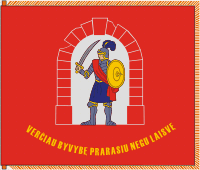
Kernavė

Klaipėda (details)

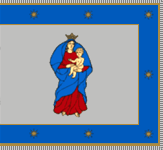
Kretinga

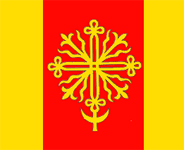
Kriukai

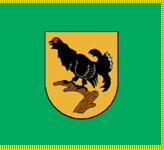
Kruopiai

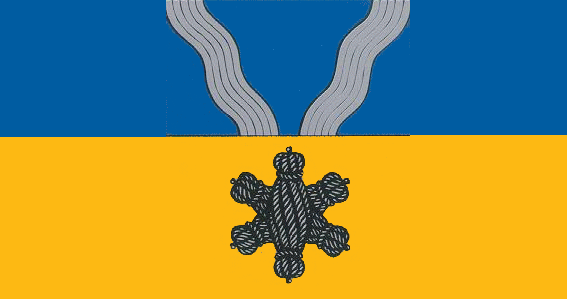
Kupiškis

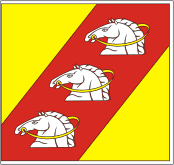
Kužiai

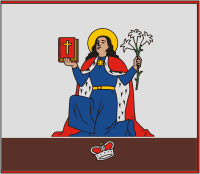
Kvėdarna

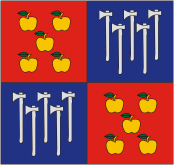
Kybartai

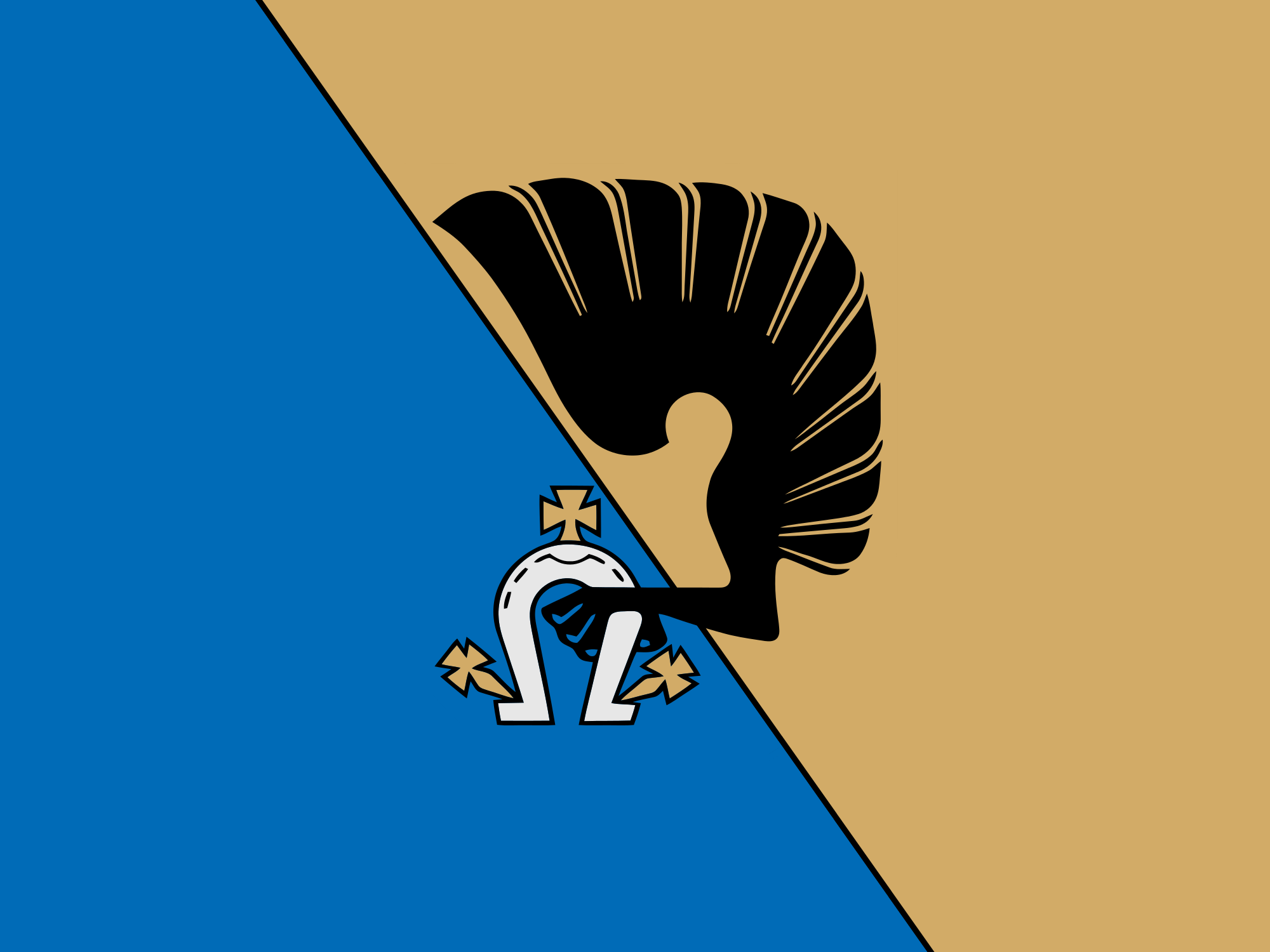
Kėdainiai

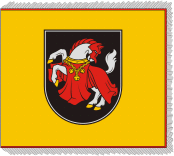
Laukuva

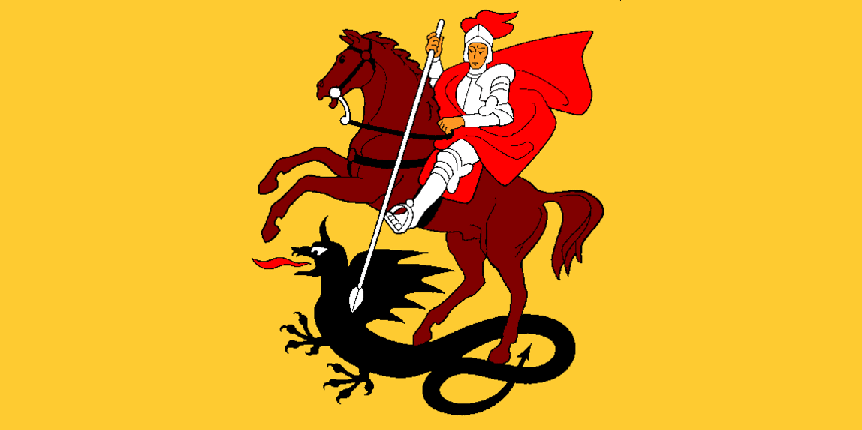
Marijampolė

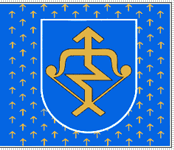
Mažeikiai

Mėčiūnai

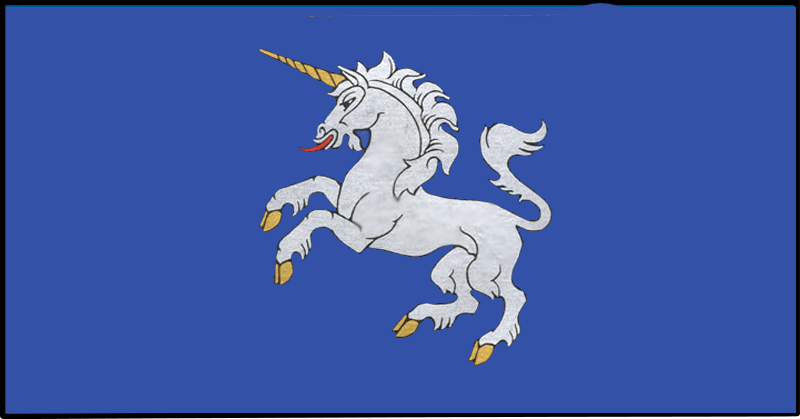
Merkinė

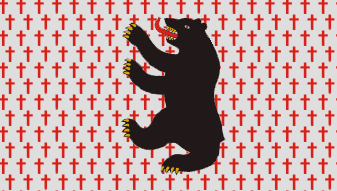
Meškuičiai

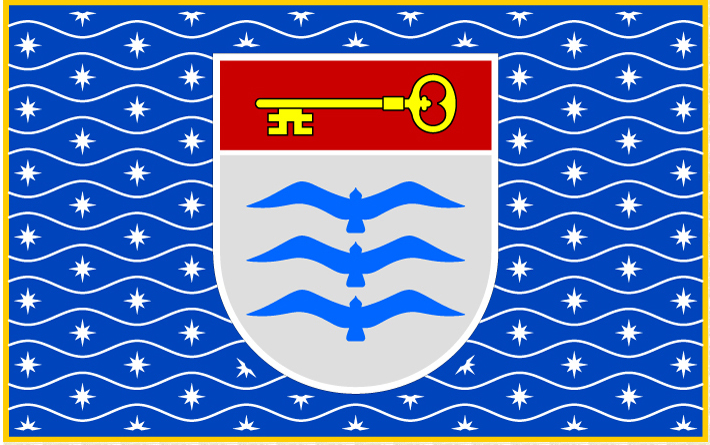
Molėtai

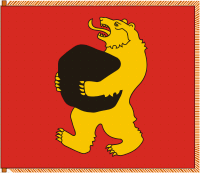
Mosėdis

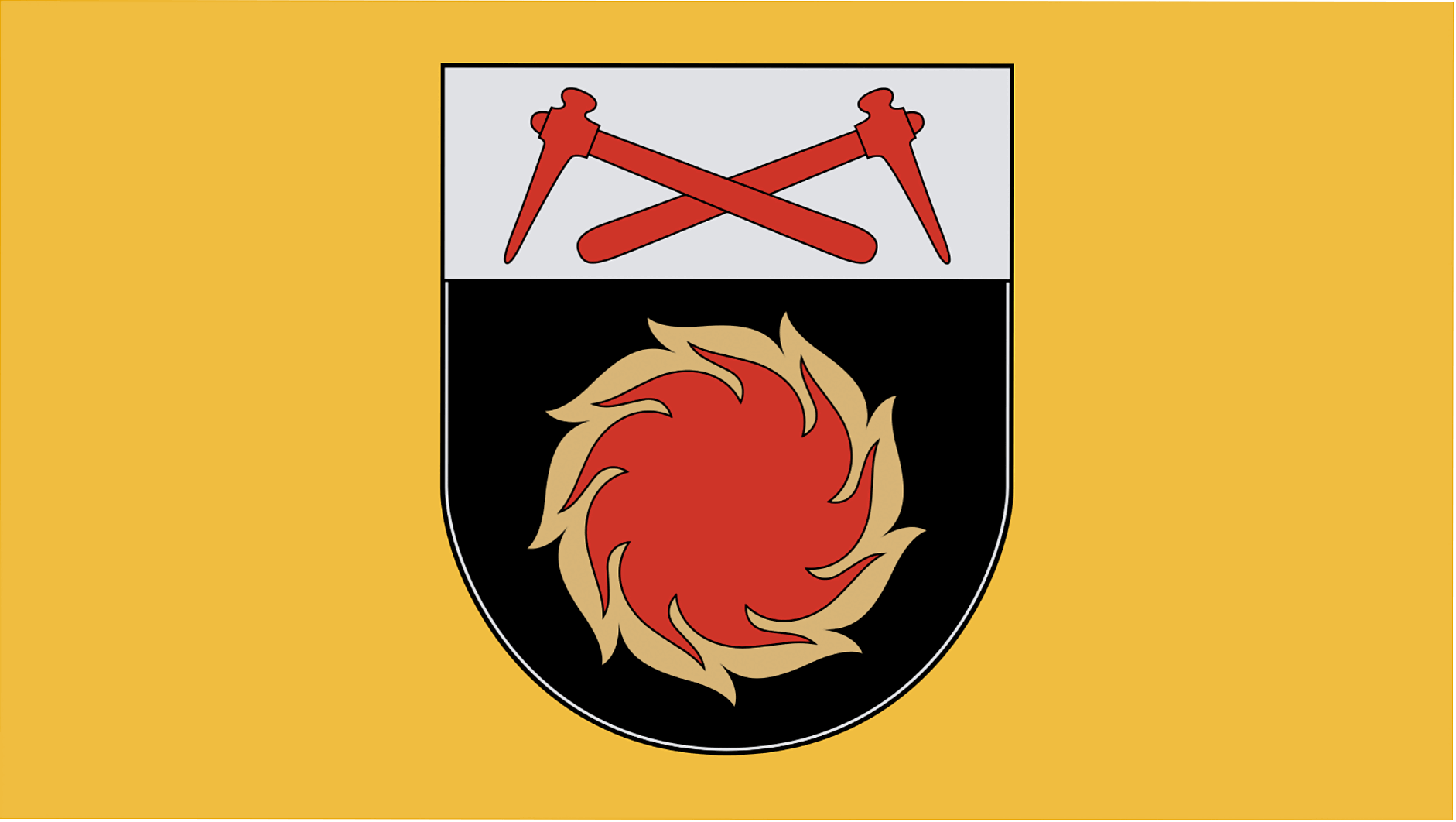
Naujoji Akmenė

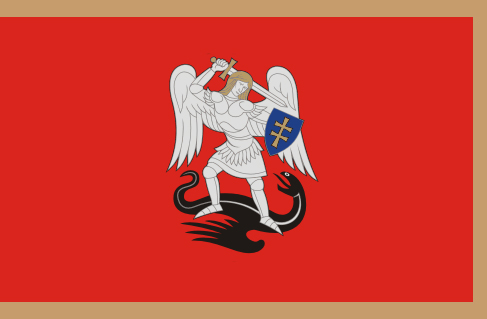
Nemenčinė

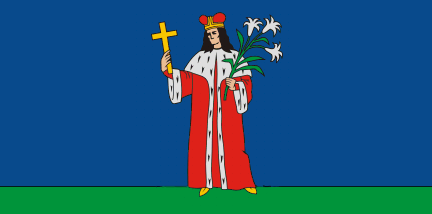
Nemunaitis

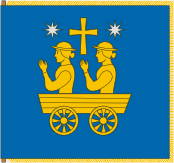
Nevarėnai

Nida

Pagėgiai

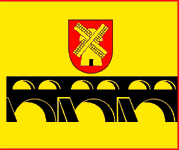
Pakruojis

Panevėžys

Papilė

Plungė

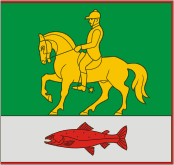
Priekulė

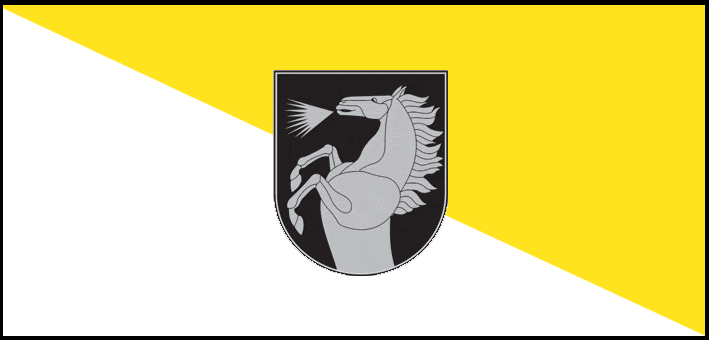
Radviliškis

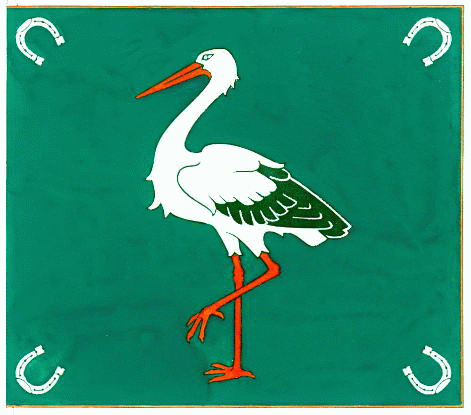
Ramygala

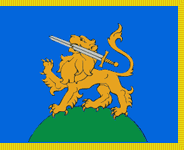
Rietavas

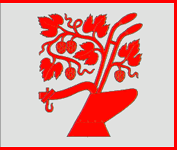
Rudiškiai

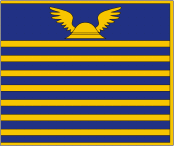
Seda

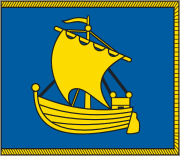
Seredžius

Šiauliai

Šilalė

Šilutė

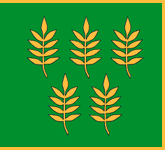
Skaistgirys

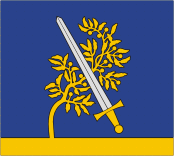
Skirsnemunė

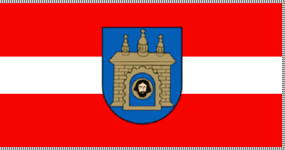
Skuodas

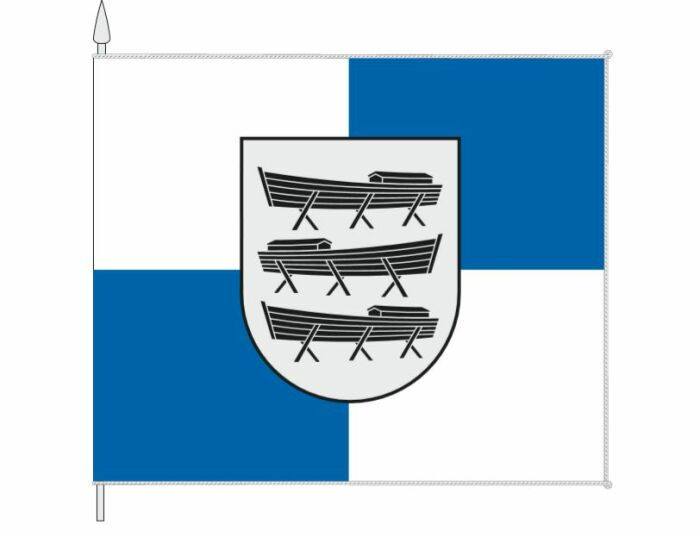
Smalininkai

Tauragė

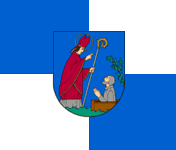
Telšiai

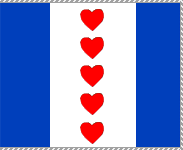
Tirkšliai

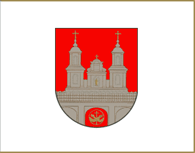
Tytuvėnai

Ukmergė

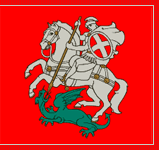
Varniai

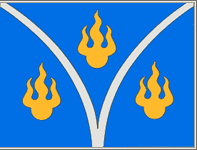
Venta

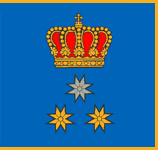
Viekšniai

Vilnius (details)

Visaginas

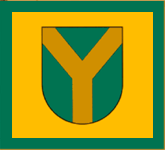
Ylakiai

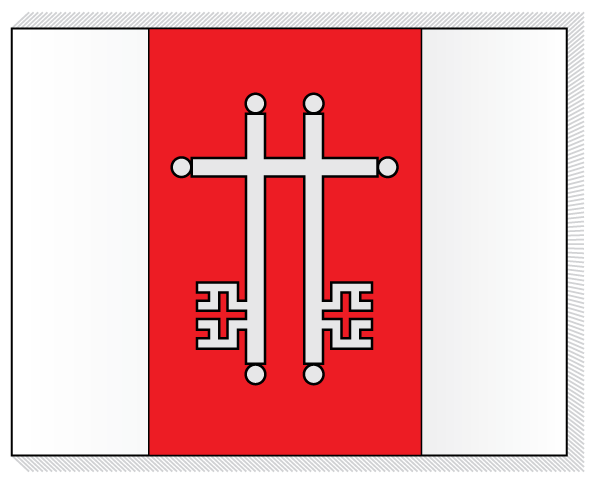
Žagarė

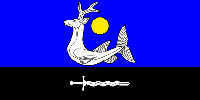
Zarasai

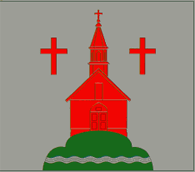
Žemaičių Kalvarija

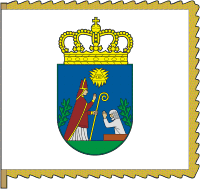
Žiežmariai

==== Historical ====
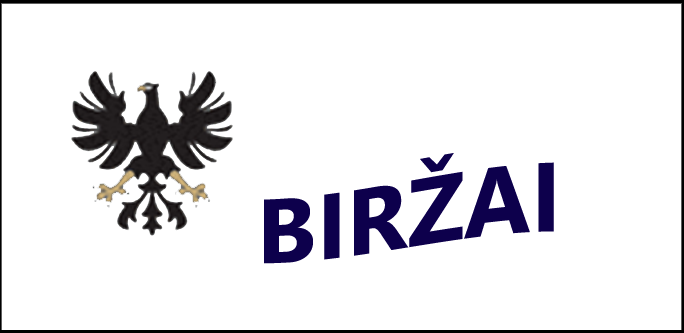
Biržai (1990–1991)

=== Norway ===
Municipal flags of Norway

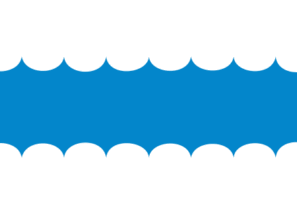
Alstahaug

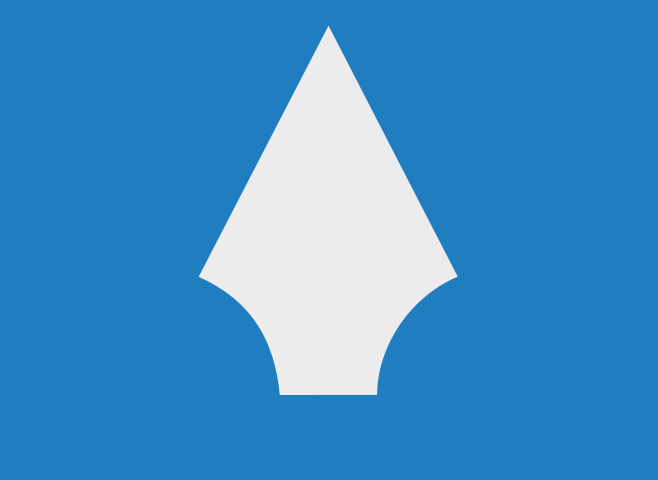
Alta

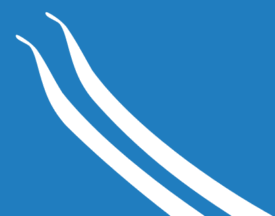
Alvdal

Andøy

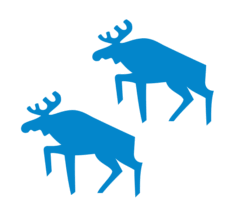
Aremark

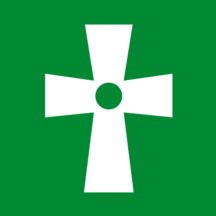
Askvoll

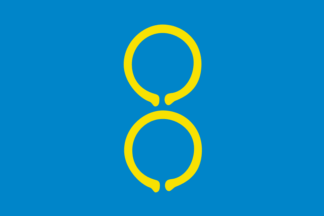
Aukra

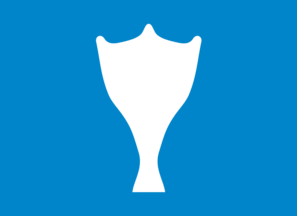
Aure

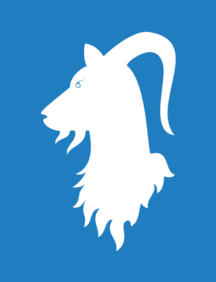
Aurland

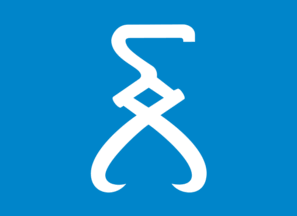
Aurskog-Høland

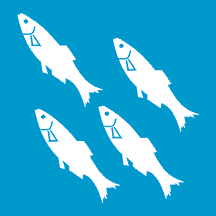
Austevoll

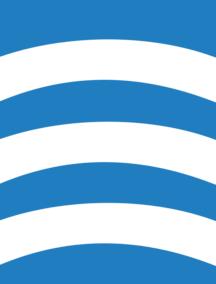
Austrheim

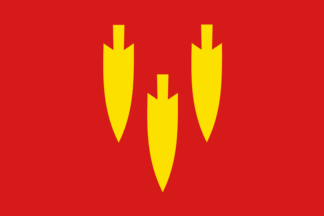
Averøy

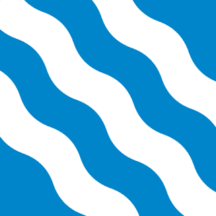
Askim

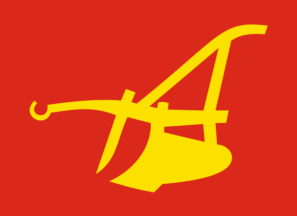
Balsfjord

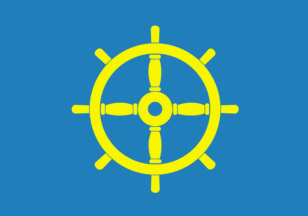
Bamble

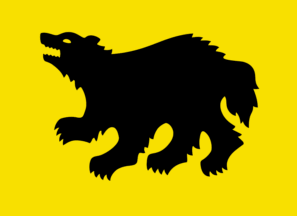
Bardu

Bergen

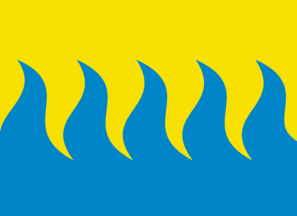
Berlevåg

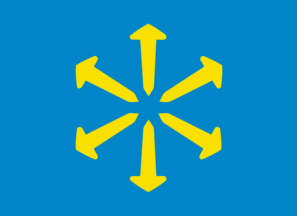
Bindal

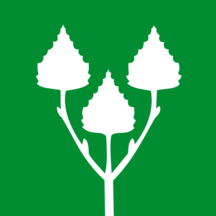
Birkenes

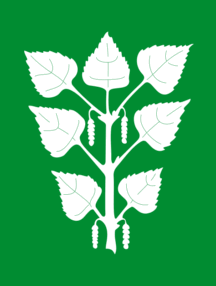
Bjerkreim

Bodø

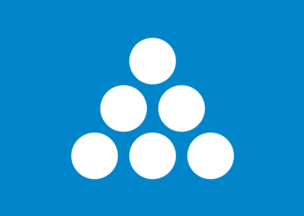
Bokn

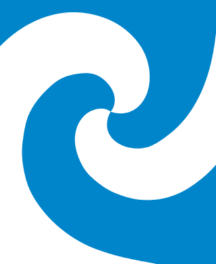
Bremanger

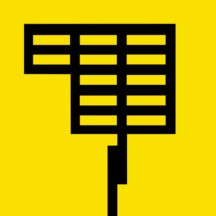
Brønnøy

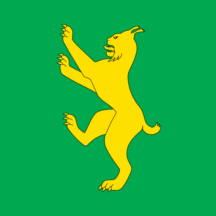
Bygland

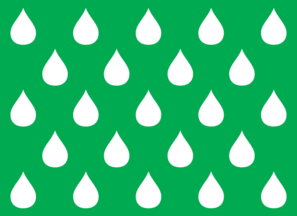
Bykle

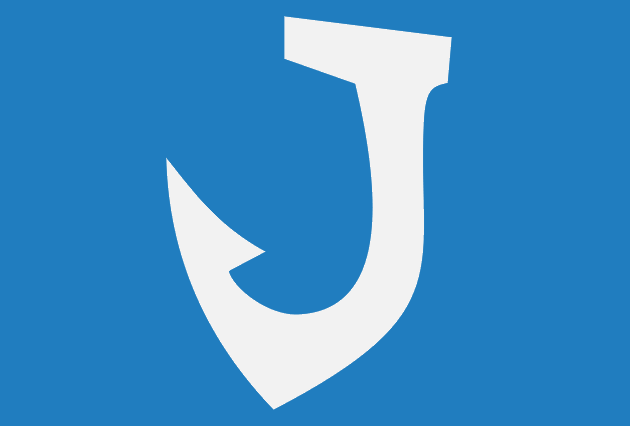
Båtsfjord

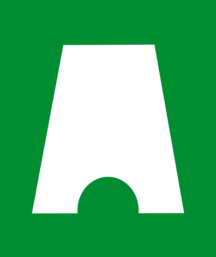
Bærum

Bø

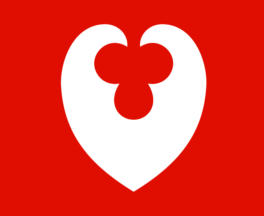
Bømlo

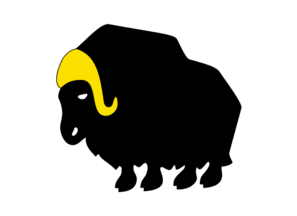
Dovre

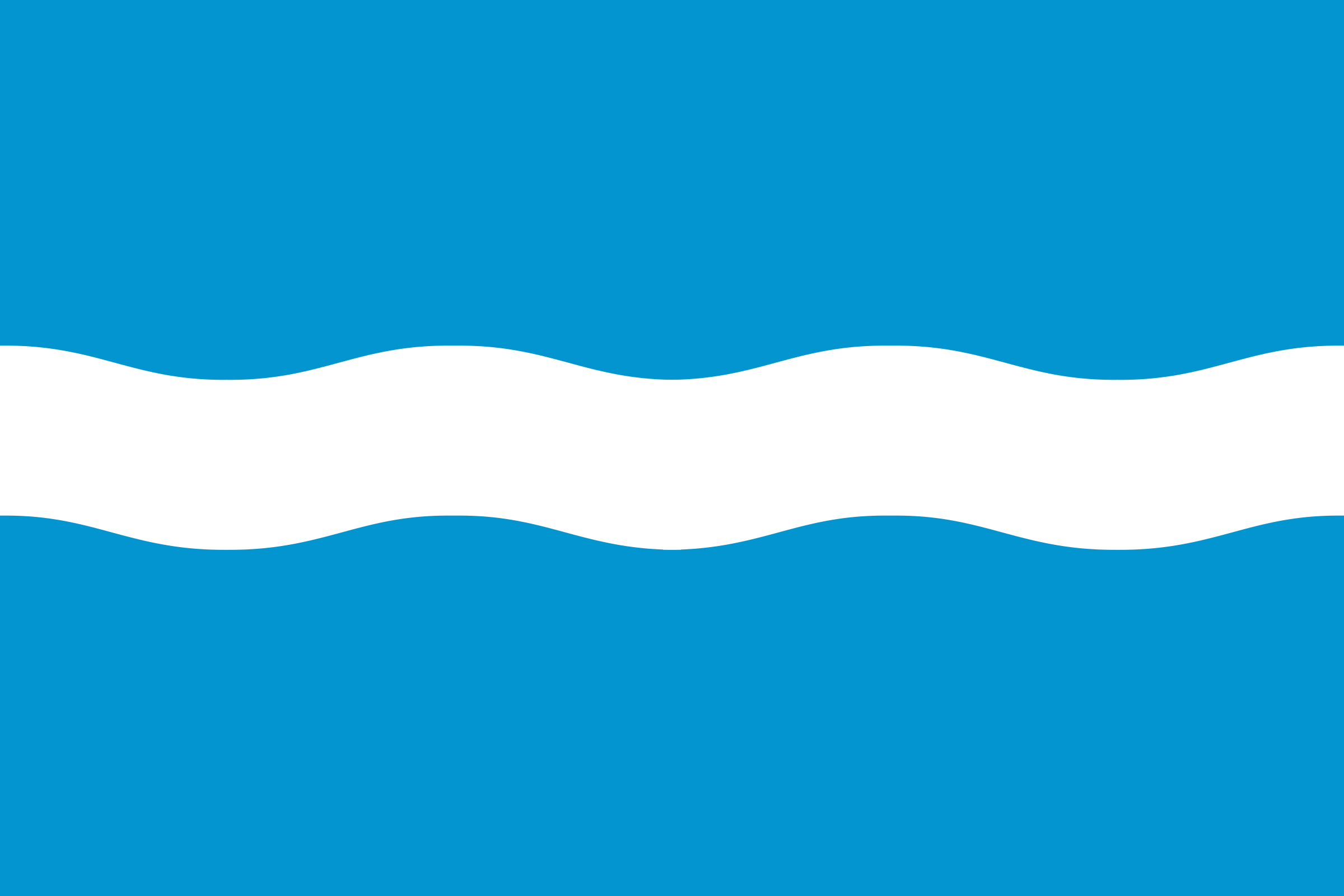
Drammen

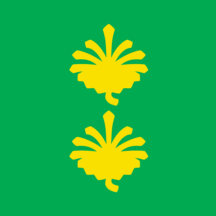
Drangedal

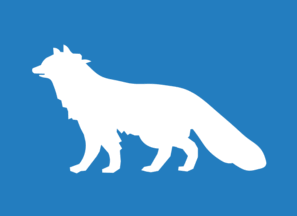
Dyrøy

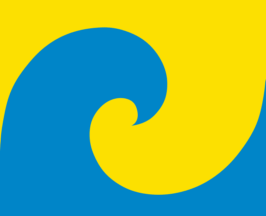
Dønna

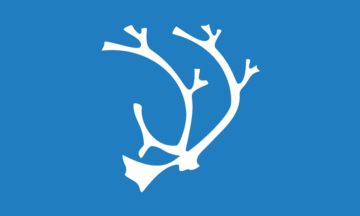
Eidfjord

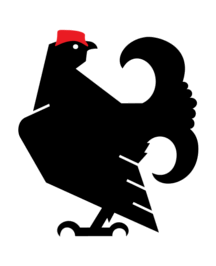
Eidskog

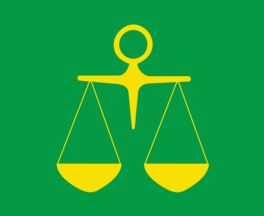
Eidsvoll

Eigersund

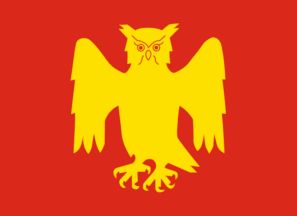
Elverum

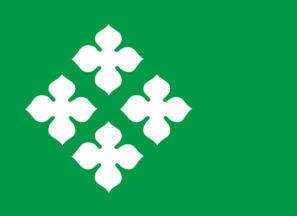
Enebakk

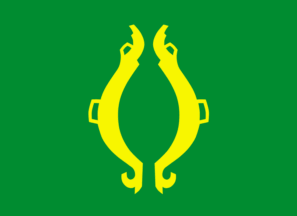
Engerdal

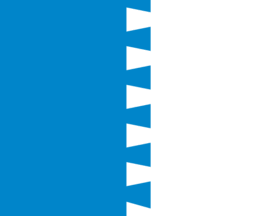
Etne

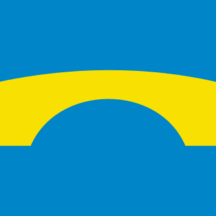
Etnedal

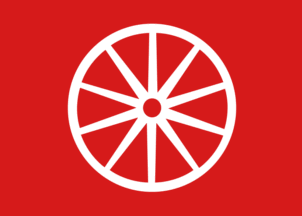
Evenes

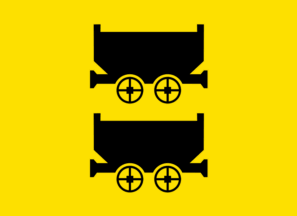
Evje og Hornnes

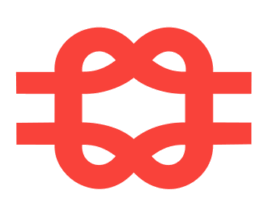
Fauske

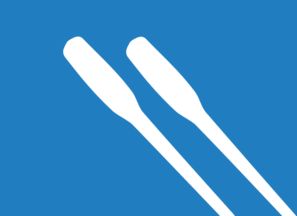
Fedje

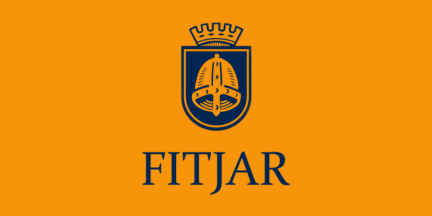
Fitjar

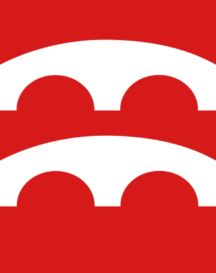
Fjaler

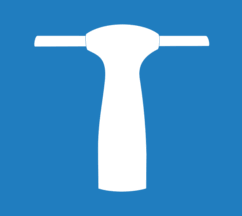
Flakstad

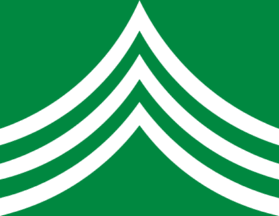
Flatanger

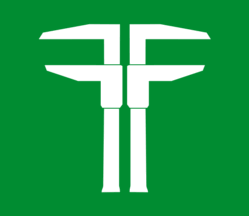
Flesberg

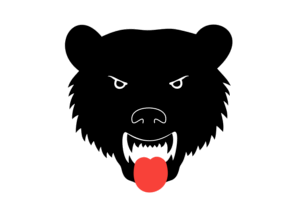
Flå

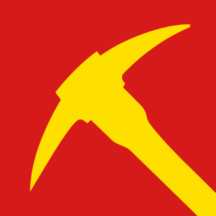
Folldal

Fredrikstad

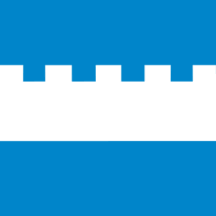
Frogn

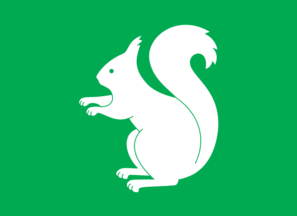
Froland

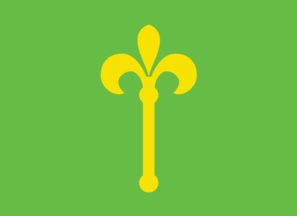
Frosta

Frøya

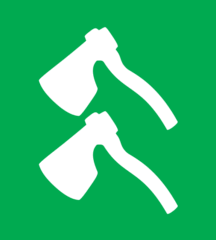
Fyresdal

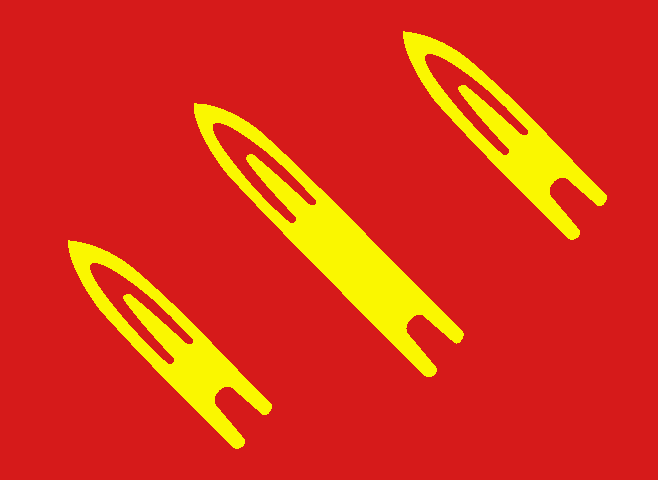
Gamvik

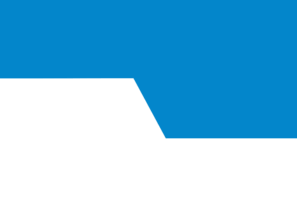
Gausdal

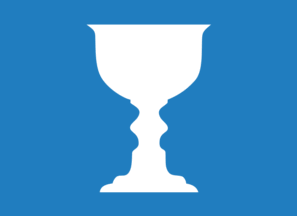
Gildeskål

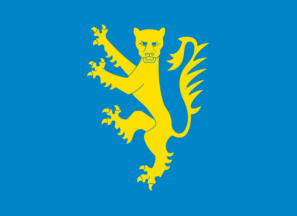
Giske

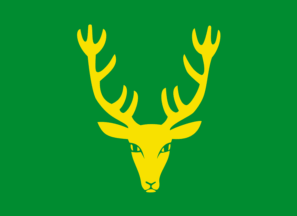
Gjemnes

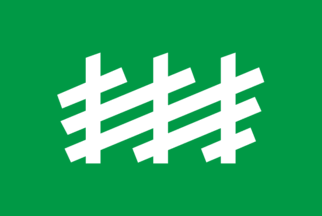
Gjerdrum

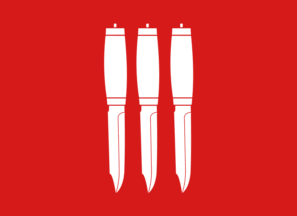
Gjerstad

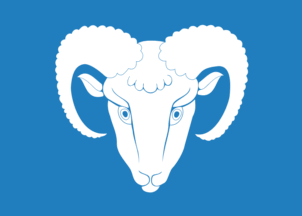
Gjesdal

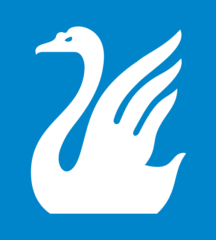
Gjøvik

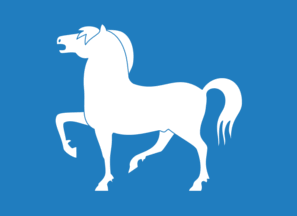
Gloppen

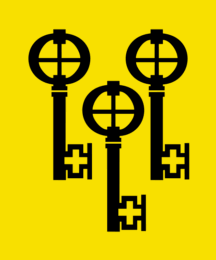
Gol

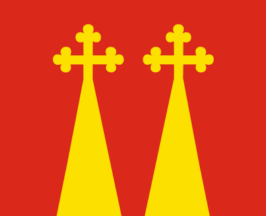
Gran

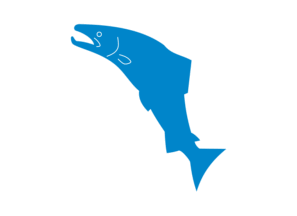
Grane

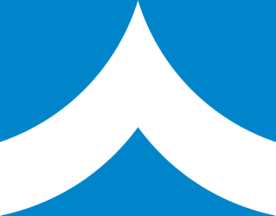
Gratangen

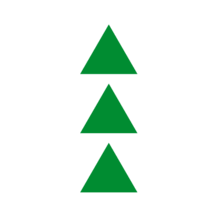
Grong

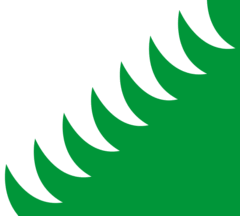
Grue

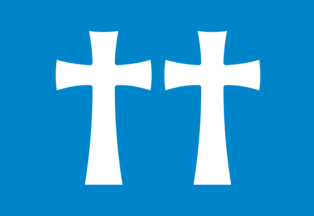
Gulen

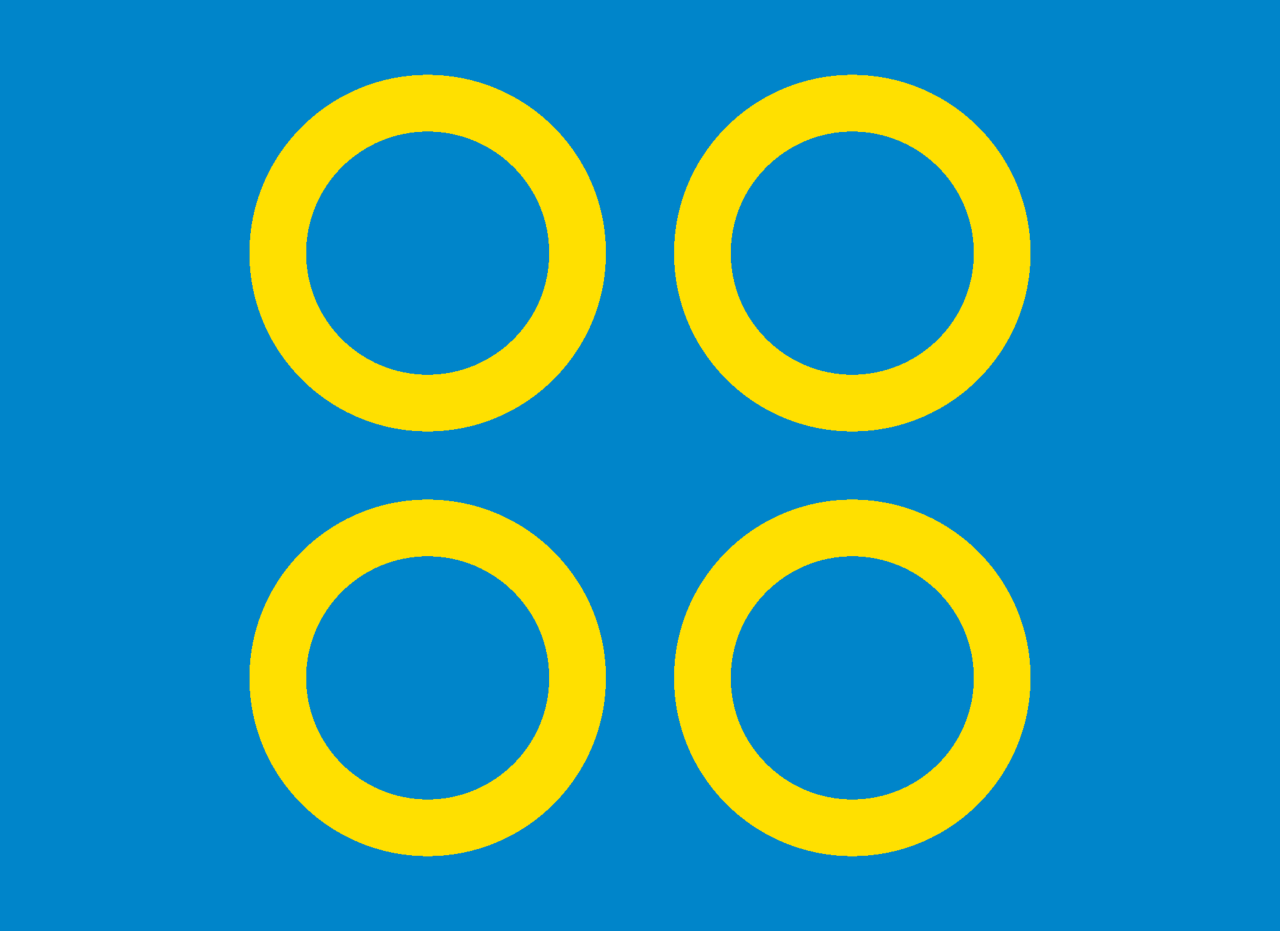
Hadsel

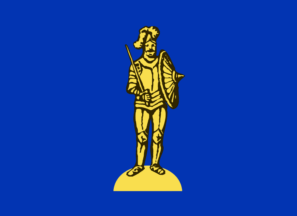
Halden

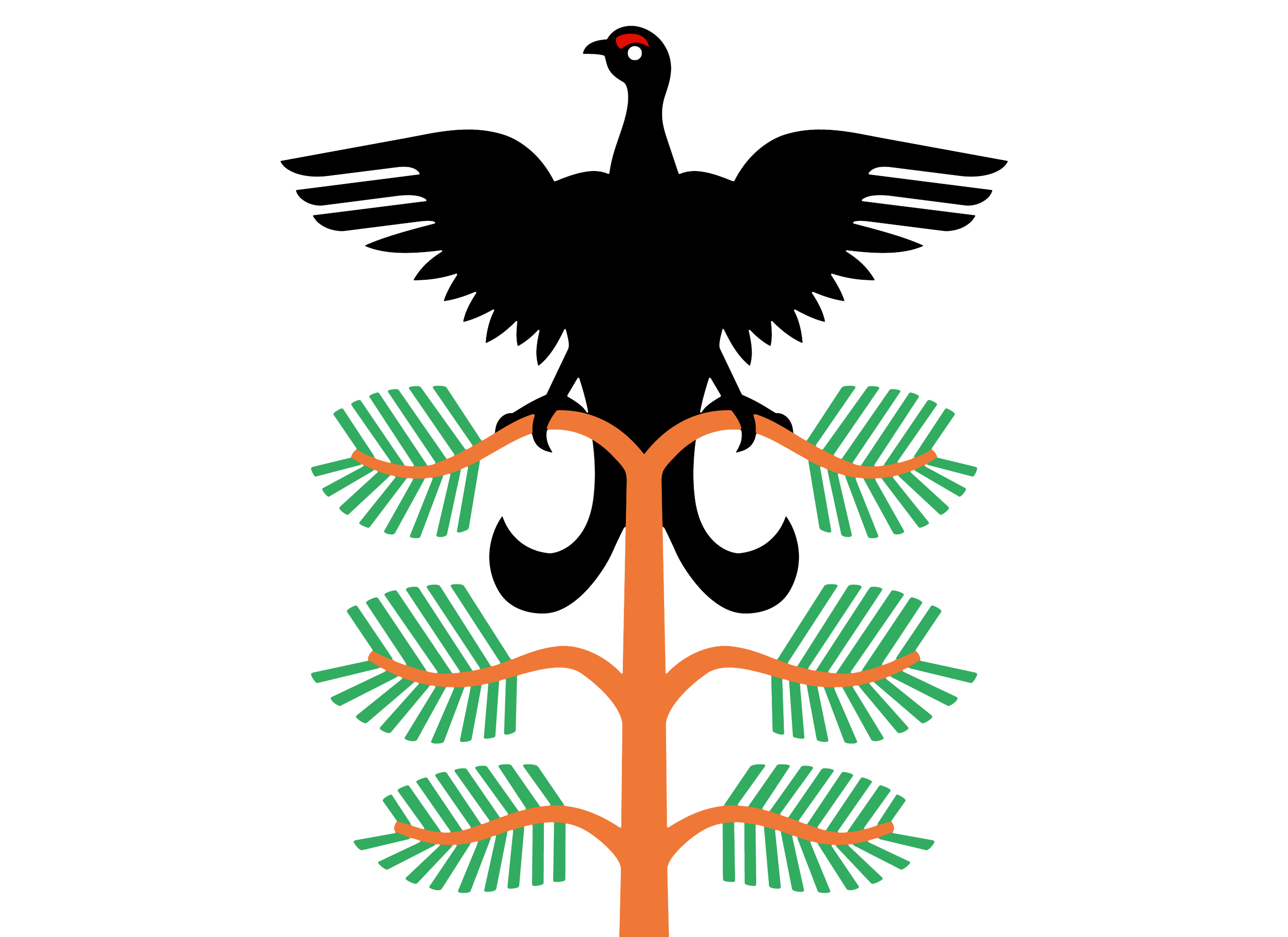
Hamar

Hammerfest

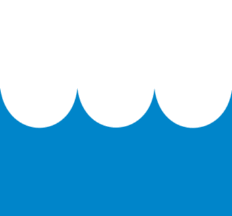
Haram

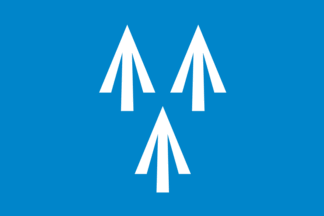
Hareid

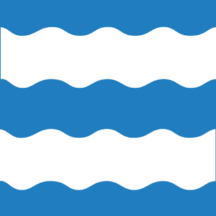
Harstad

Hasvik

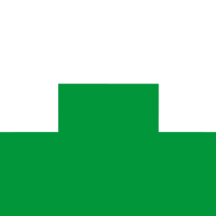
Hattfjelldal

Haugesund

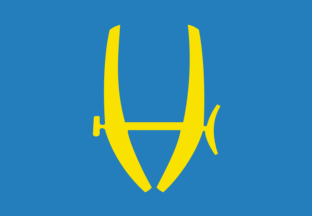
Hemnes

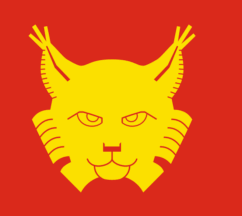
Hemsedal

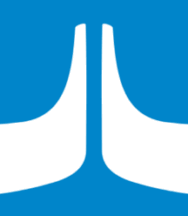
Herøy (Møre og Romsdal)

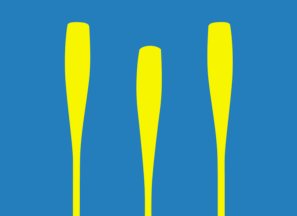
Herøy (Nordland)

Hitra

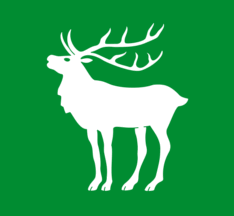
Hjartdal

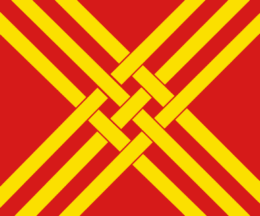
Hjelmeland

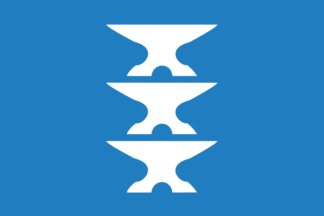
Hol

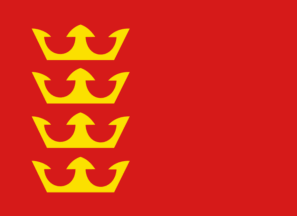
Hole

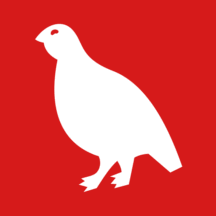
Holtålen

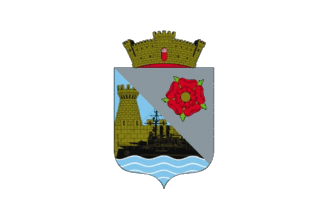
Horten

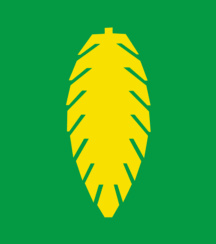
Hurdal

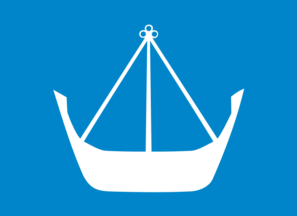
Hvaler

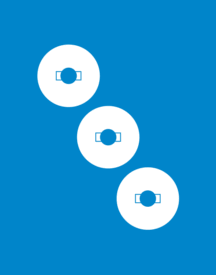
Hyllestad

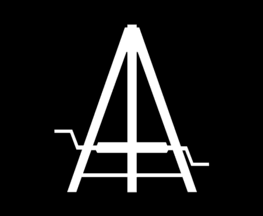
Hå

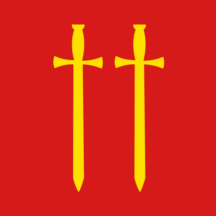
Hægebostad

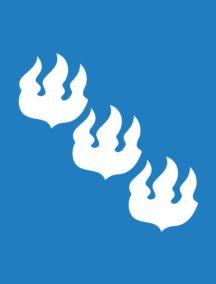
Høyanger

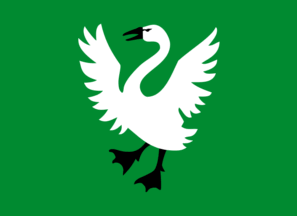
Høylandet

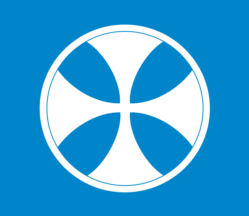
Ibestad

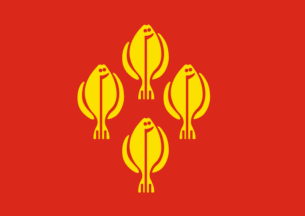
Inderøy

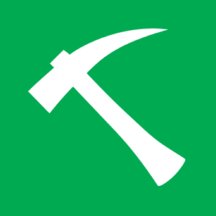
Iveland

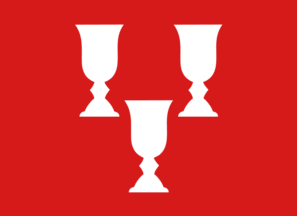
Jevnaker

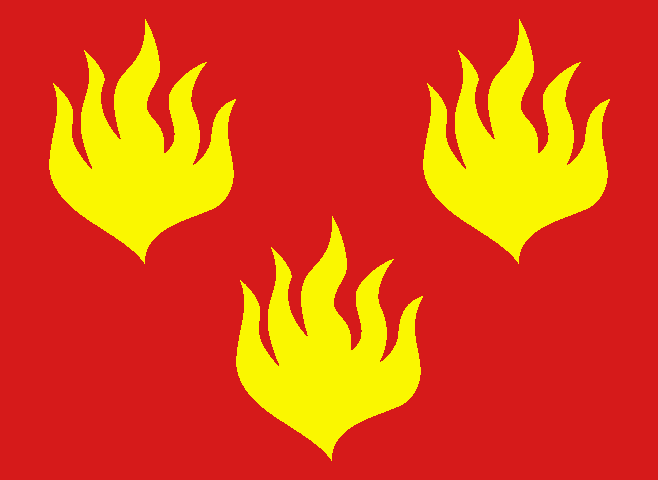
Karasjok

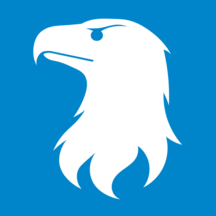
Karlsøy

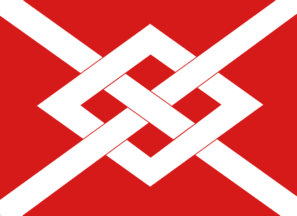
Karmøy

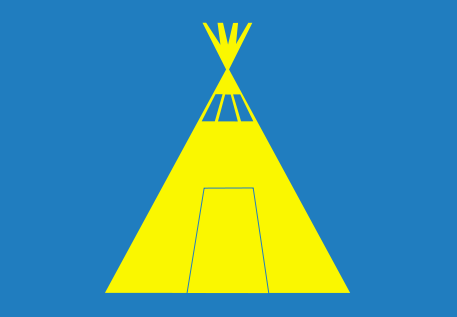
Kautokeino

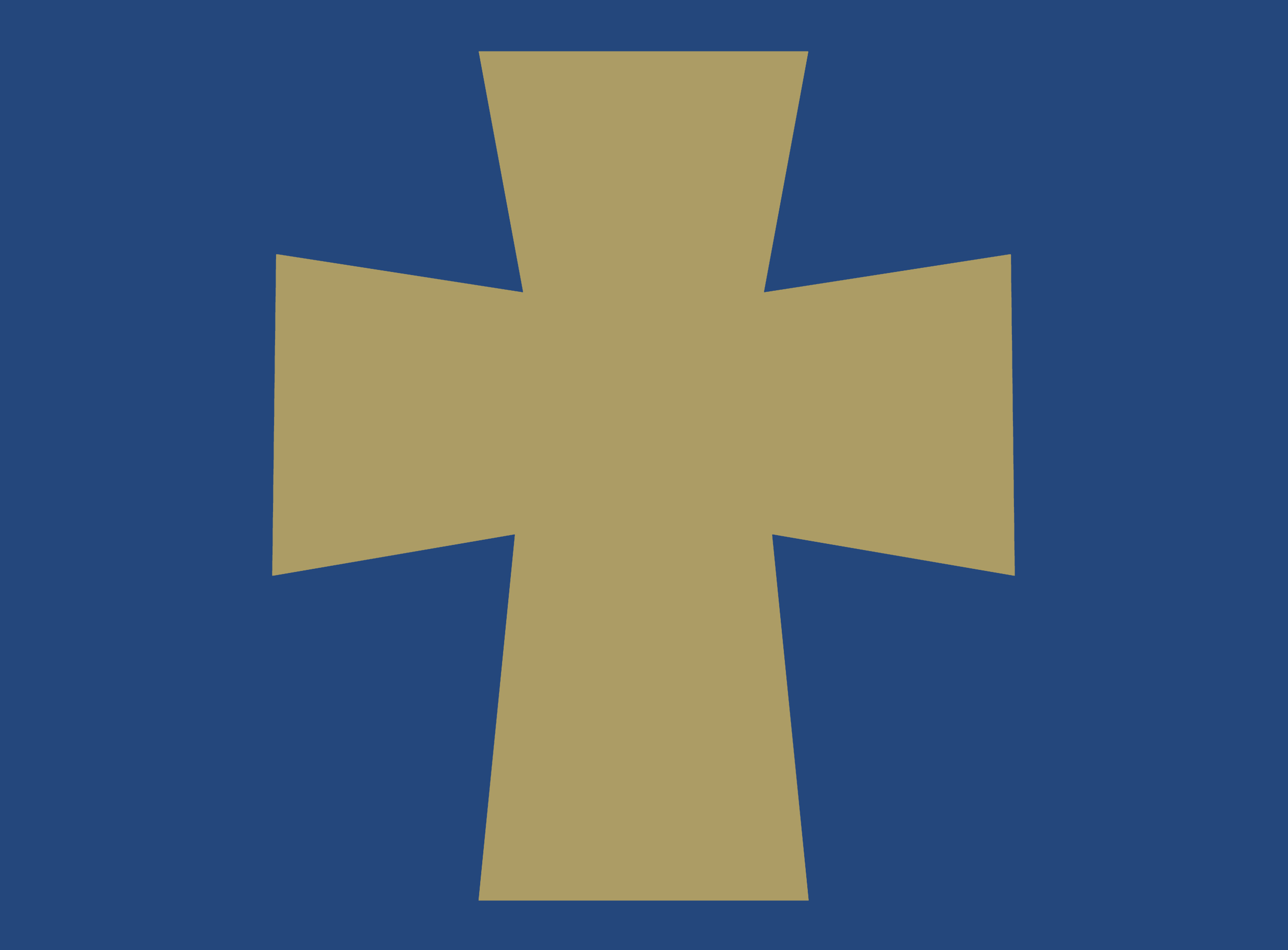
Klepp

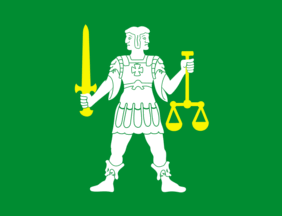
Kongsberg

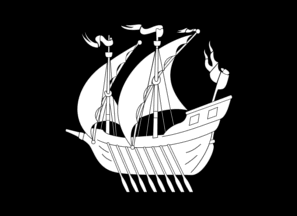
Kragerø

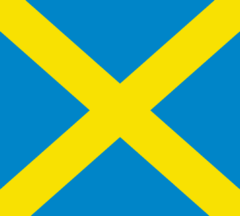
Krødsherad

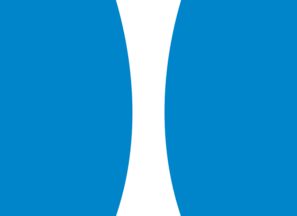
Kvam

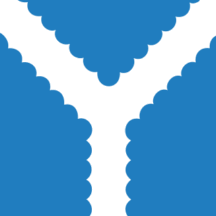
Kvinesdal

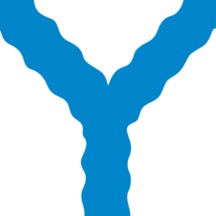
Kvinnherad

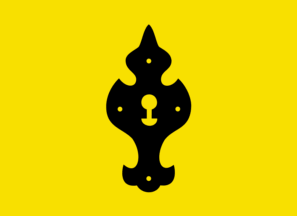
Kviteseid

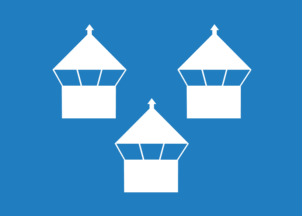
Kvitsøy

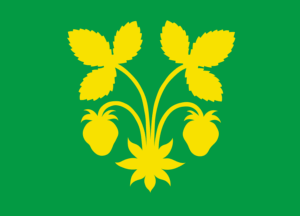
Kvæfjord

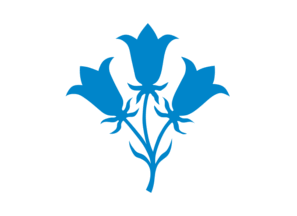
Kvænangen

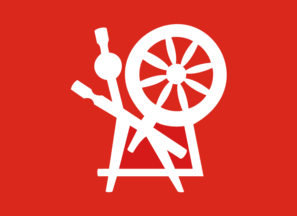
Kåfjord

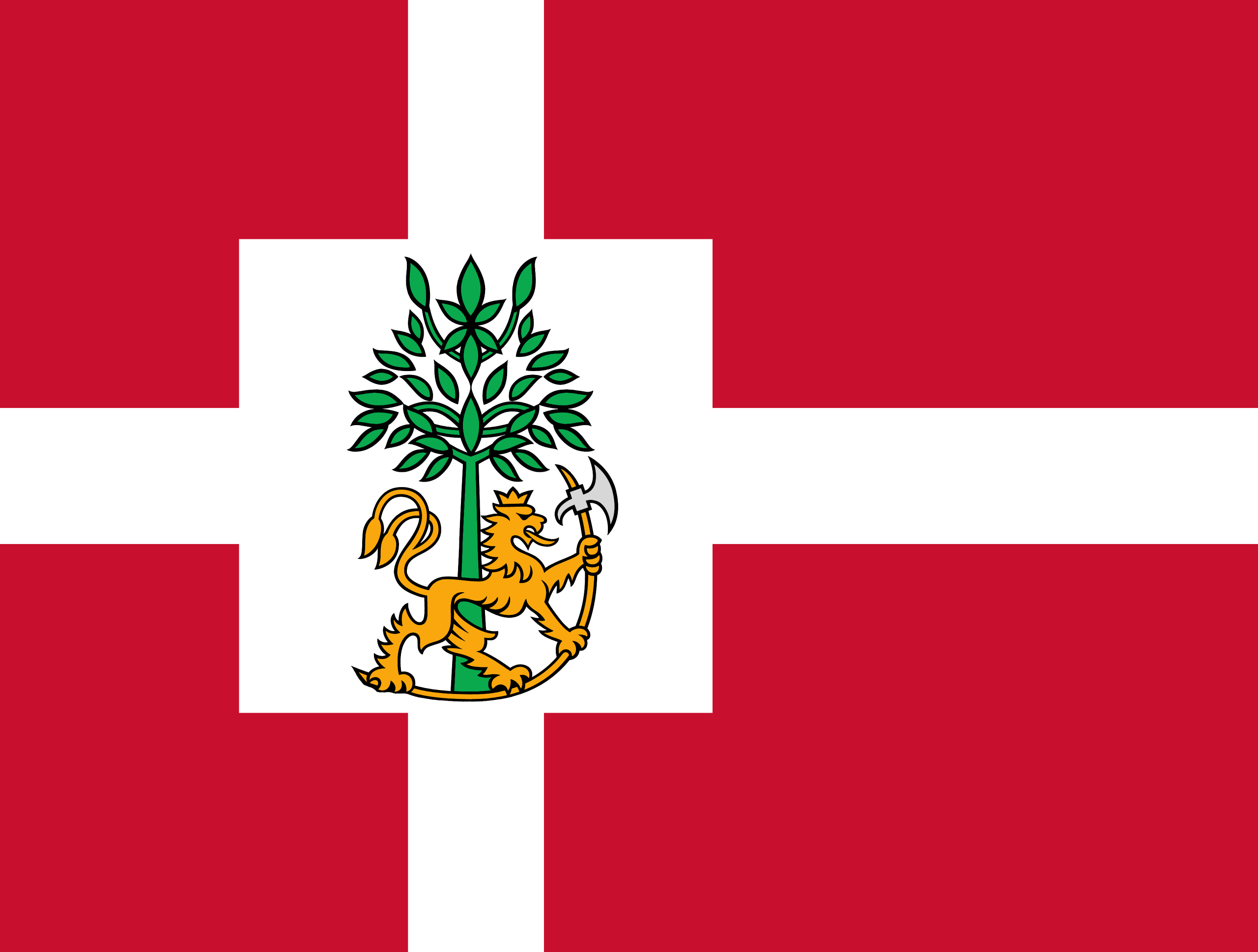
Kristiansand

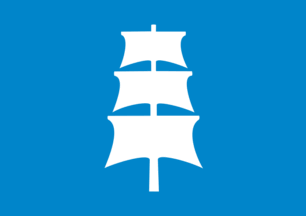
Larvik

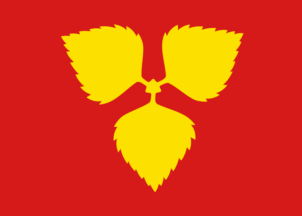
Lavangen

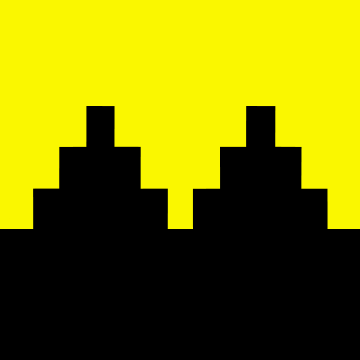
Lebesby

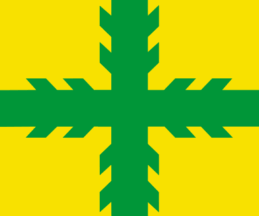
Leirfjord

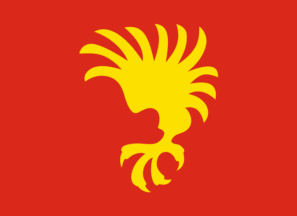
Leka

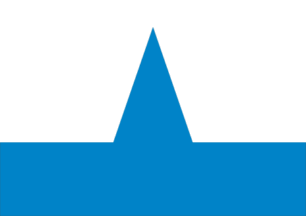
Lesja

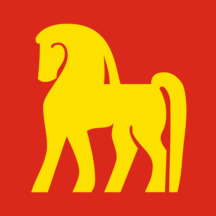
Levanger

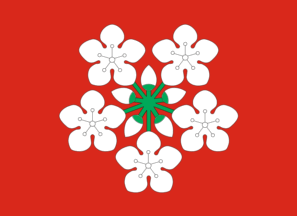
Lier

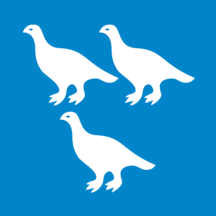
Lierne

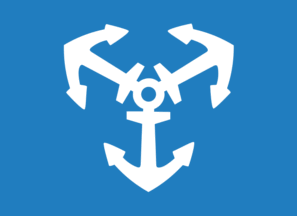
Lillesand

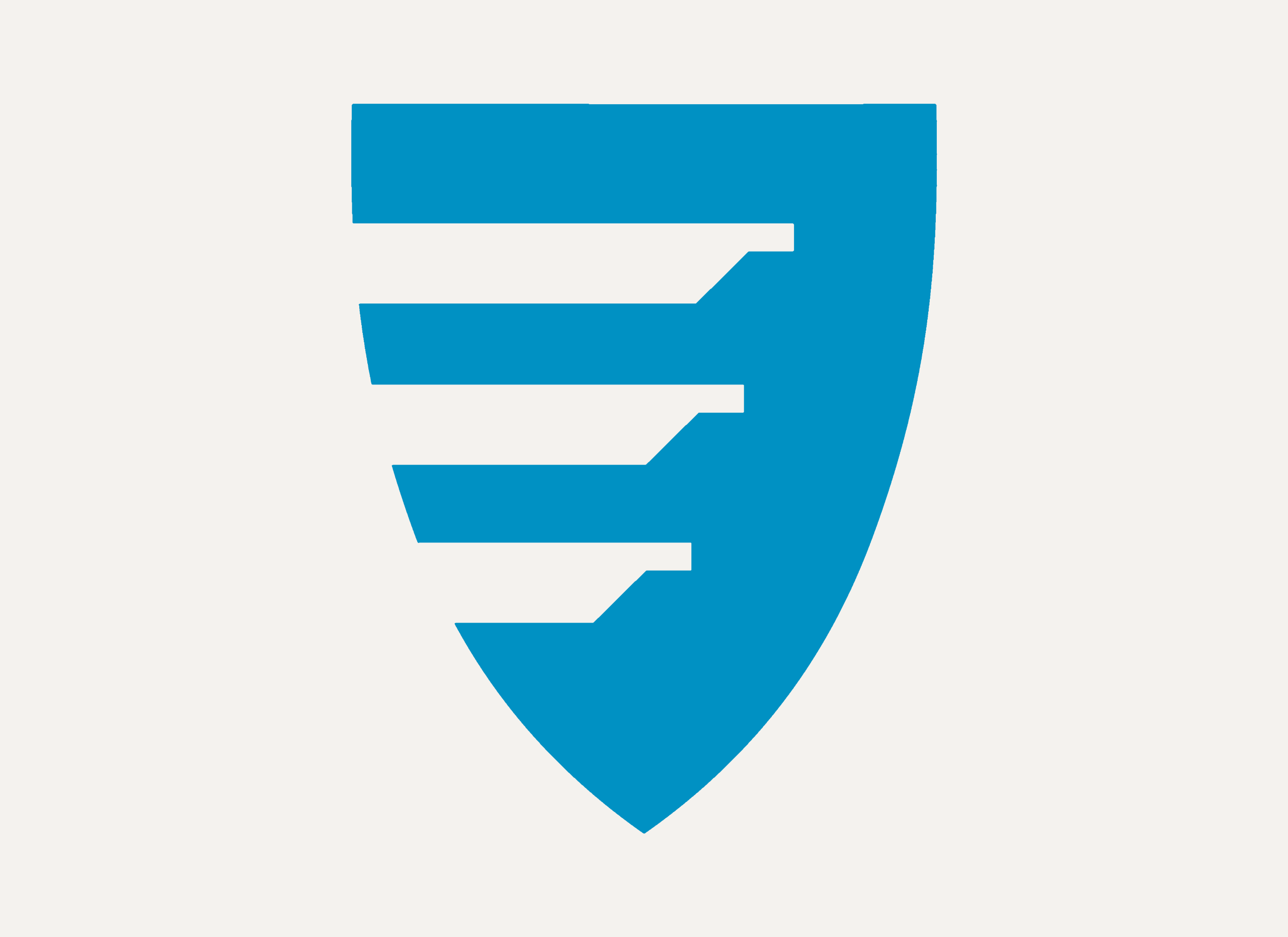
Lillestrøm

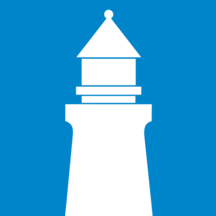
Lindesnes

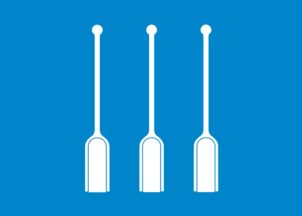
Lom

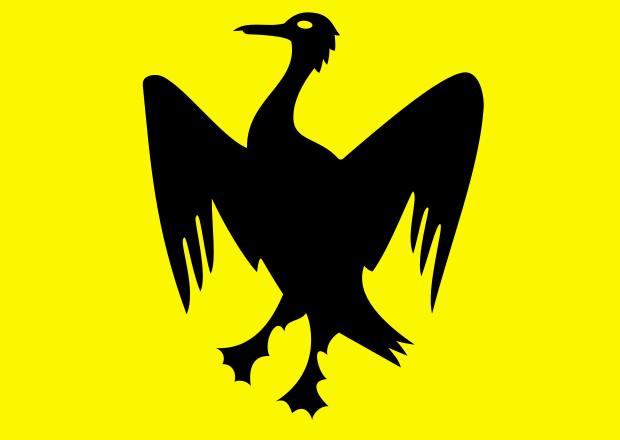
Loppa

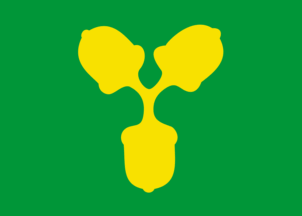
Lund

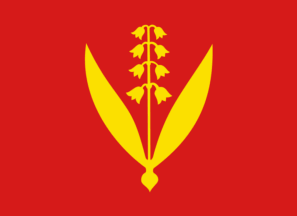
Lunner

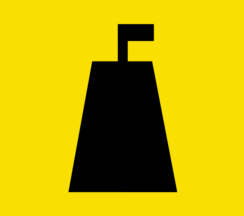
Lurøy

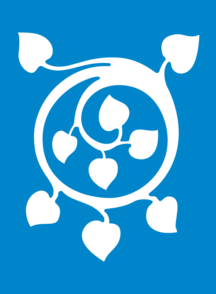
Luster

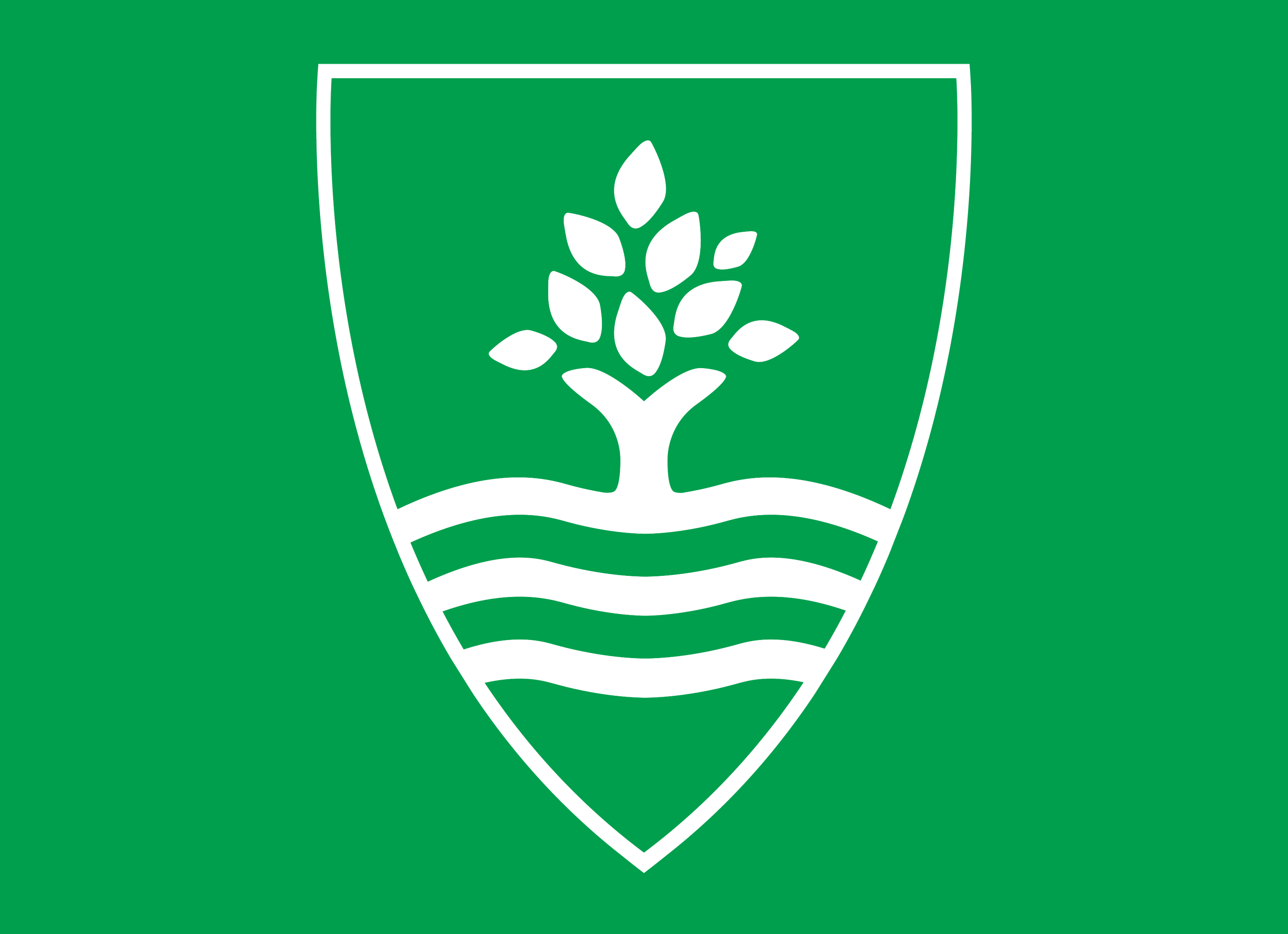
Lyngdal

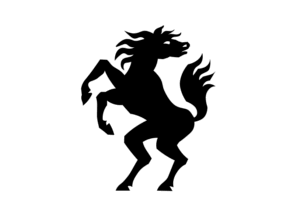
Lyngen

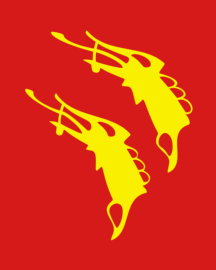
Lærdal

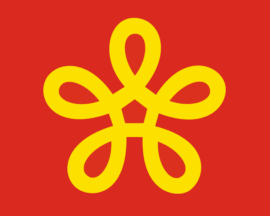
Lødingen

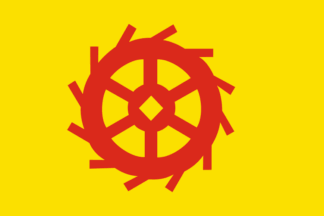
Lørenskog

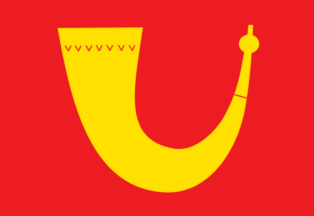
Løten

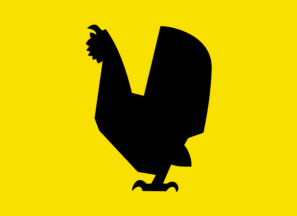
Malvik

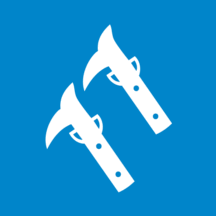
Marker

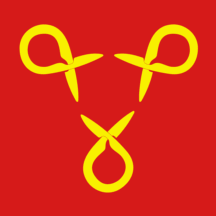
Masfjorden

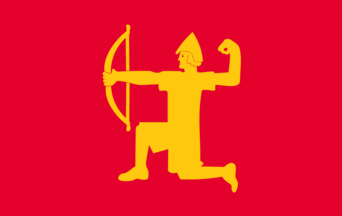
Melhus

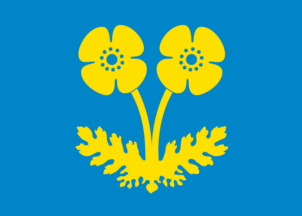
Meløy

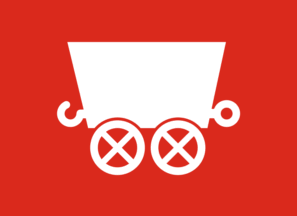
Meråker

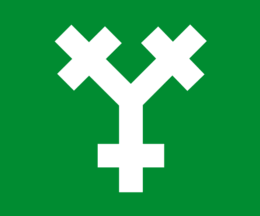
Midtre Gauldal

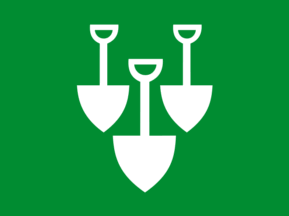
Modalen

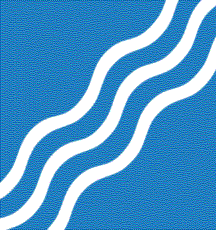
Modum

Molde

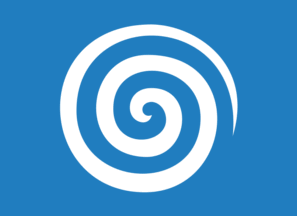
Moskenes

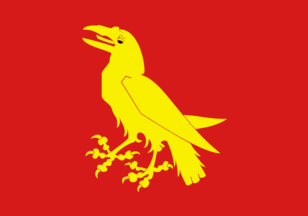
Moss

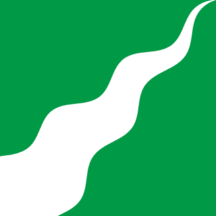
Målselv

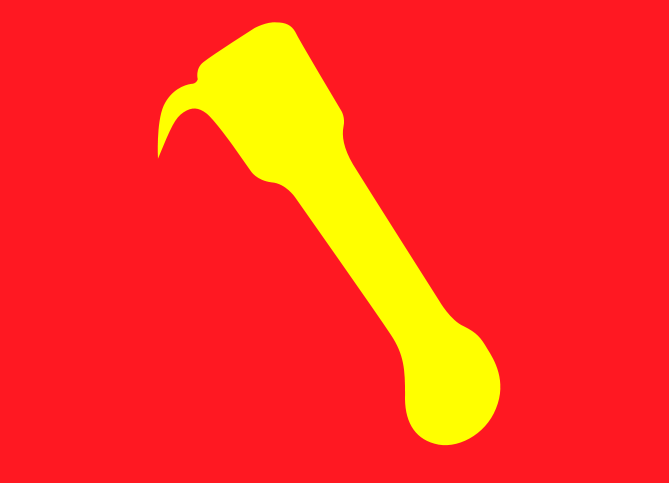
Måsøy

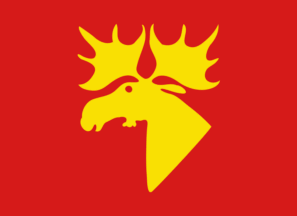
Namsos

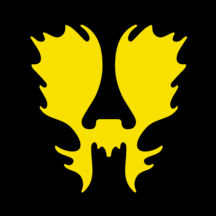
Namsskogan

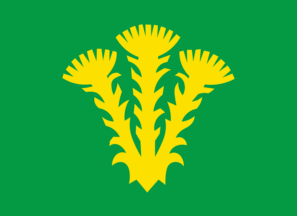
Nannestad

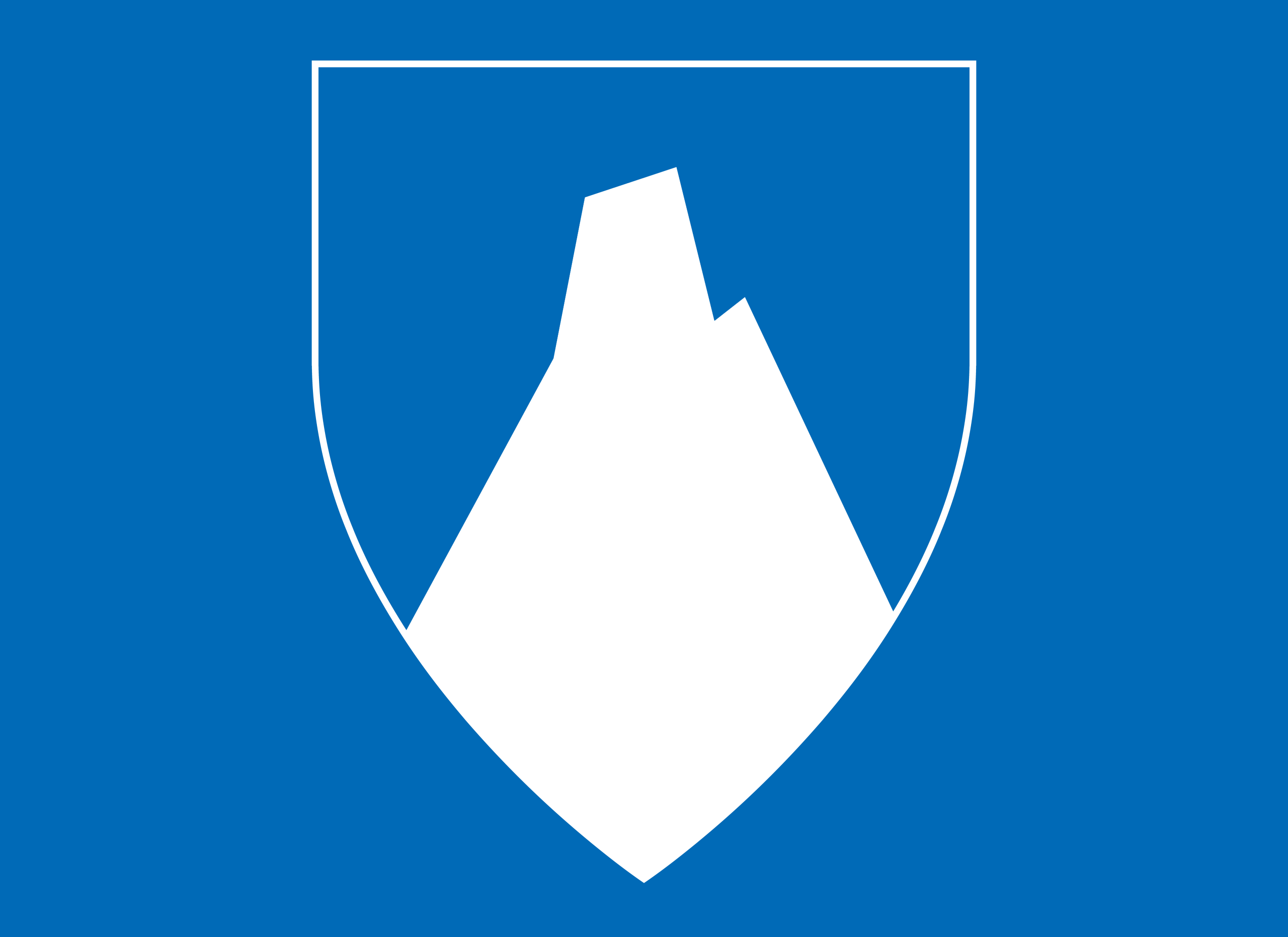
Narvik

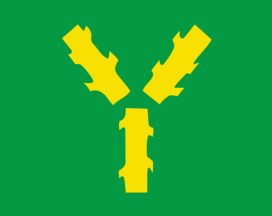
Nes

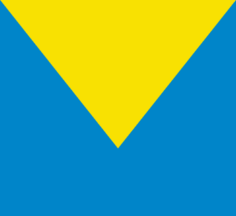
Nesna

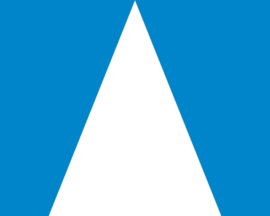
Nesodden

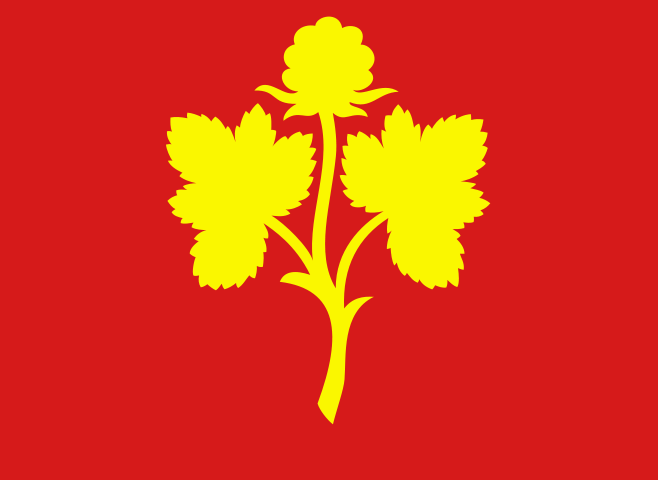
Nesseby

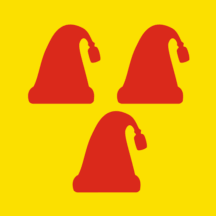
Nissedal

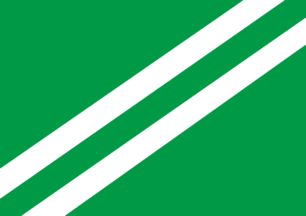
Nittedal

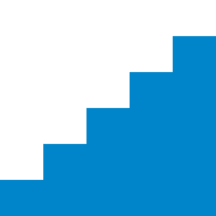
Nome

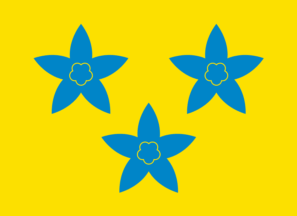
Nord-Aurdal

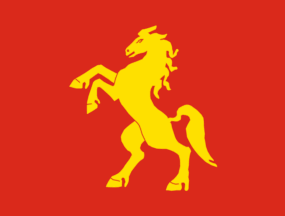
Nord-Fron

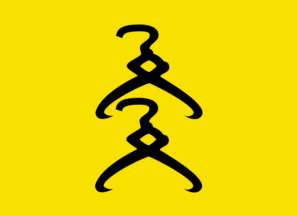
Nord-Odal

Nordkapp

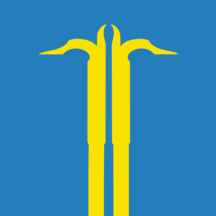
Nordre Land

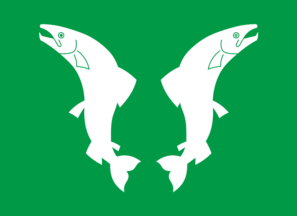
Nordreisa

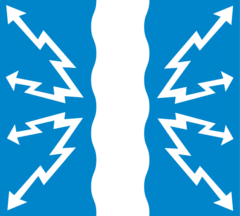
Notodden

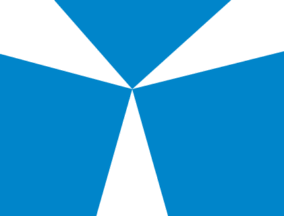
Oppdal

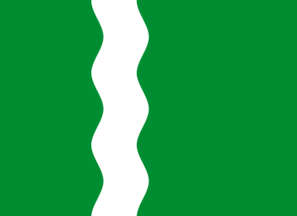
Orkdal

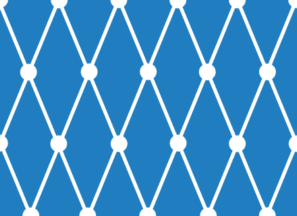
Osen

Oslo

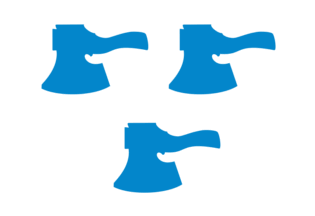
Osterøy

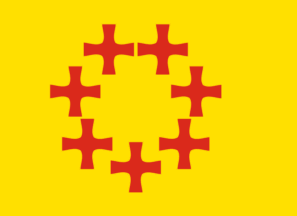
Overhalla

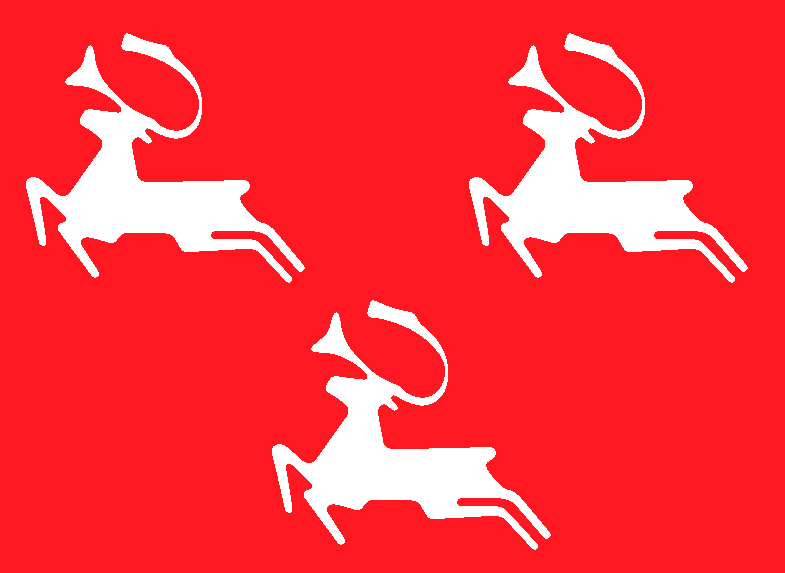
Porsanger

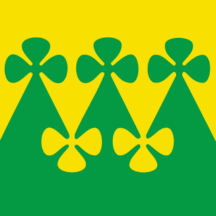
Rakkestad

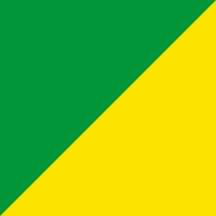
Rana

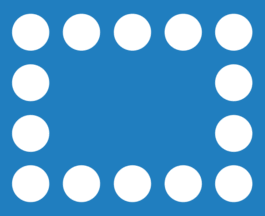
Randaberg

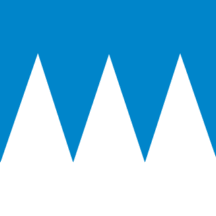
Rauma

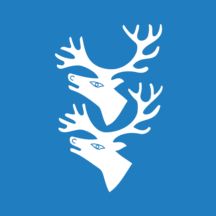
Rendalen

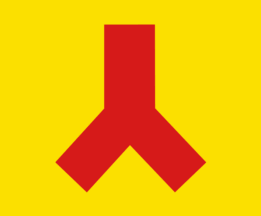
Rennebu

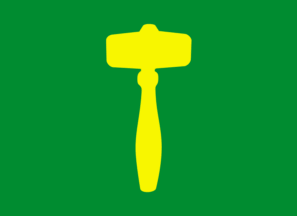
Rindal

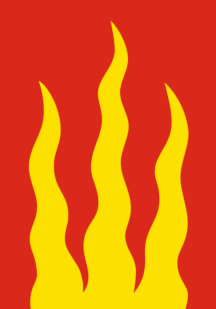
Ringebu

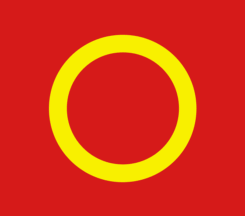
Ringerike

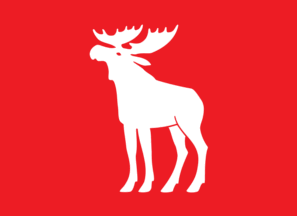
Ringsaker

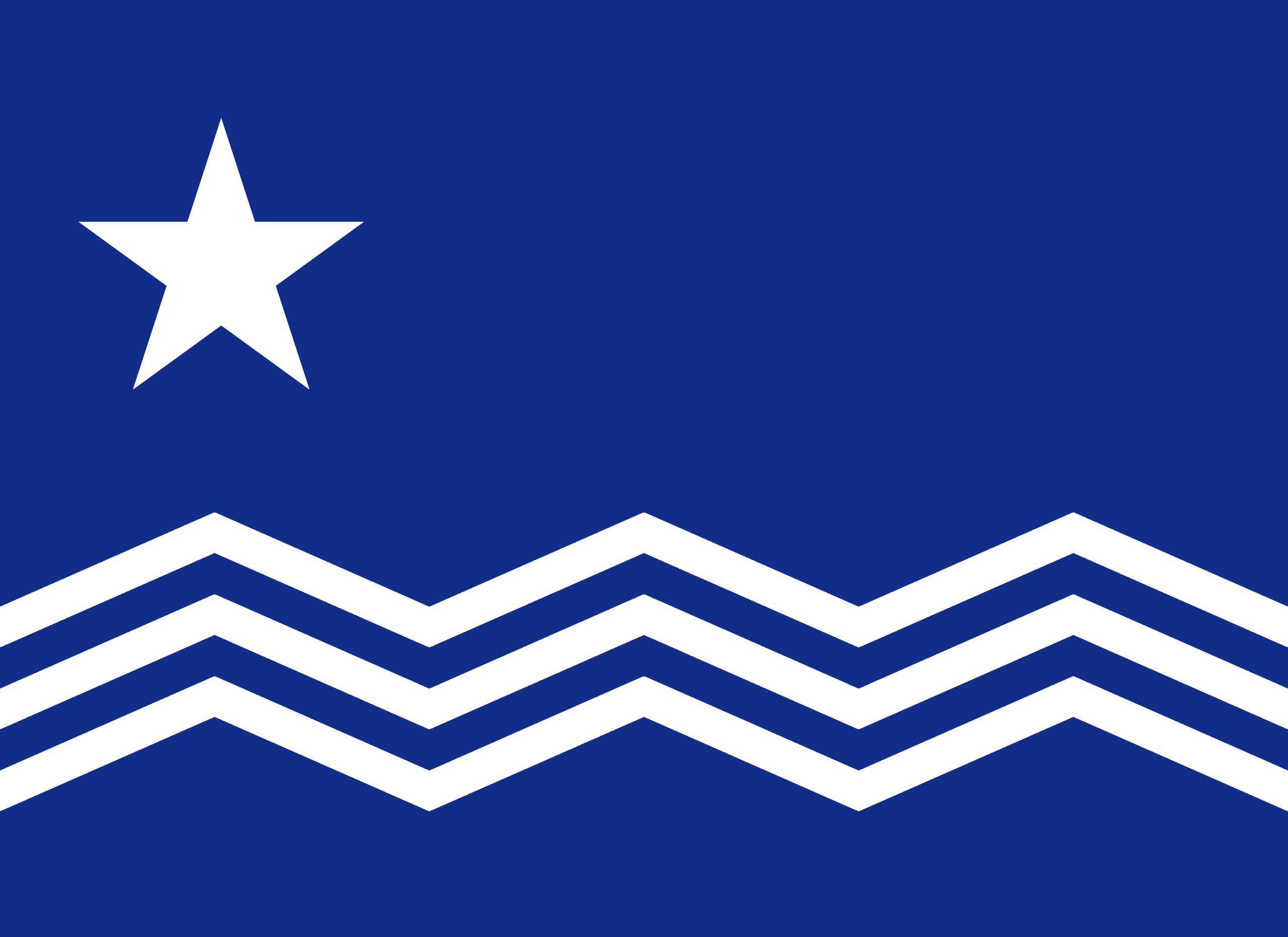
Risør

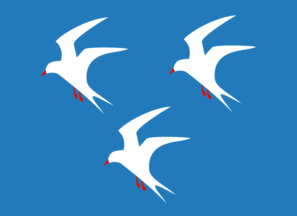
Roan

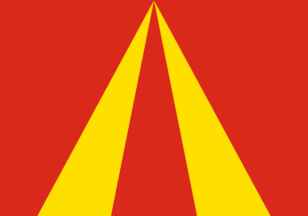
Rollag

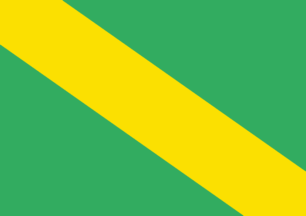
Råde

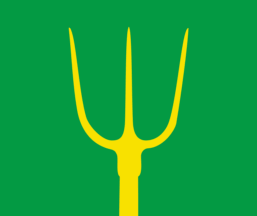
Rælingen

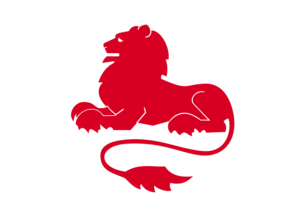
Rødøy

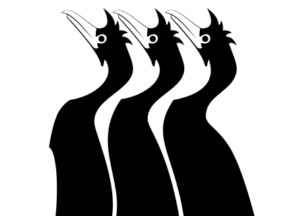
Røst

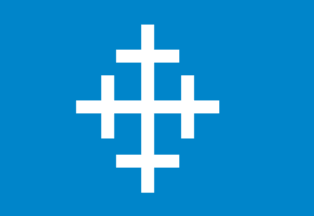
Røyrvik

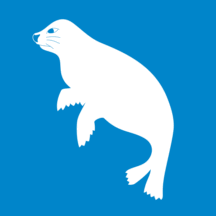
Salangen

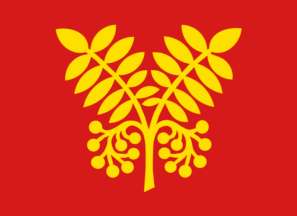
Saltdal

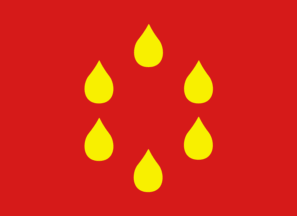
Samnanger

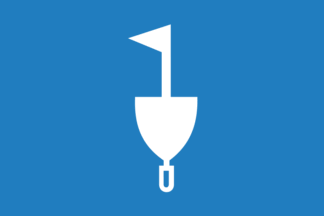
Sande

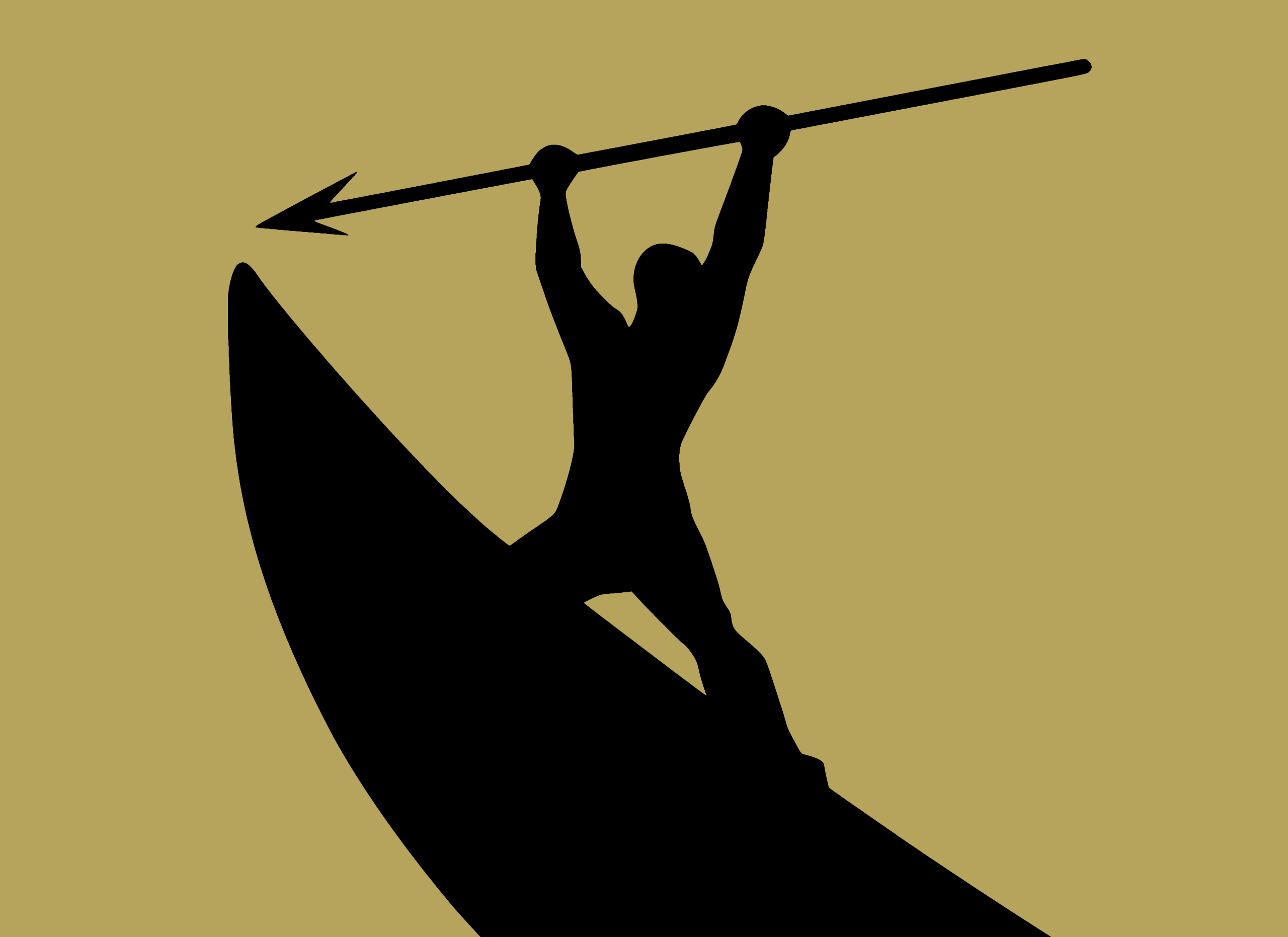
Sandefjord

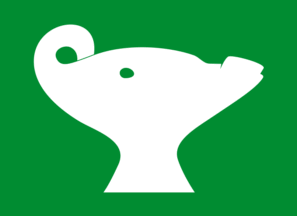
Sandnes

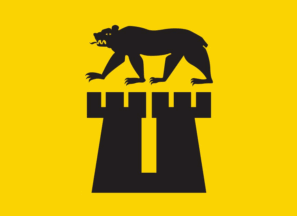
Sarpsborg

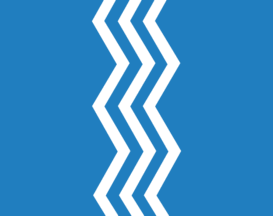
Sauda

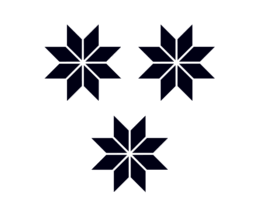
Selbu

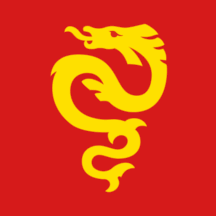
Seljord

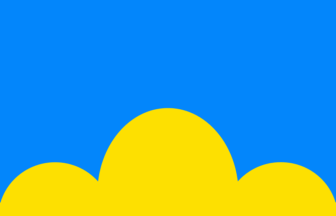
Sigdal

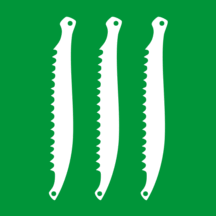
Siljan

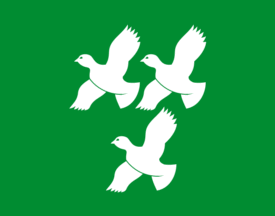
Sirdal

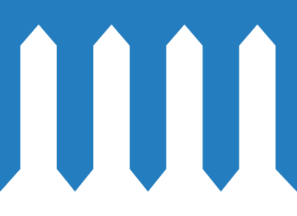
Skaun

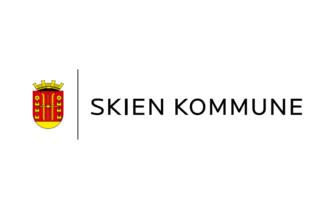
Skien

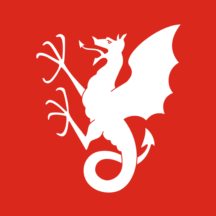
Skiptvet

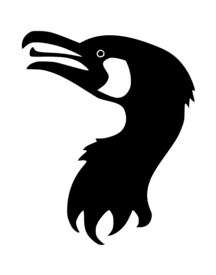
Skjervøy

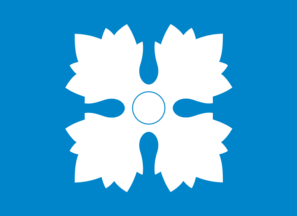
Skjåk

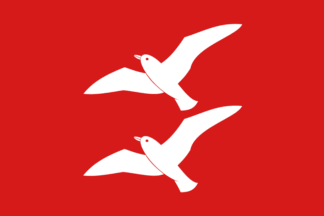
Smøla

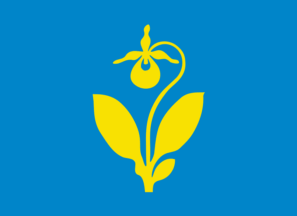
Snåsa

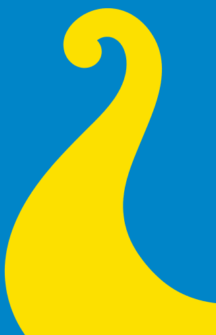
Sogndal

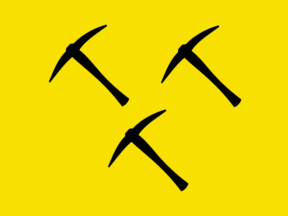
Sokndal

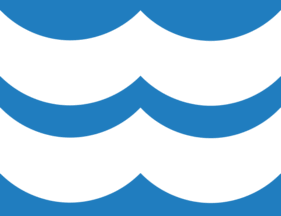
Sola

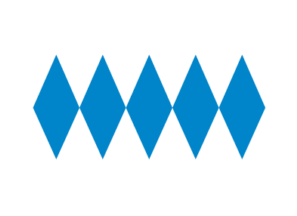
Solund

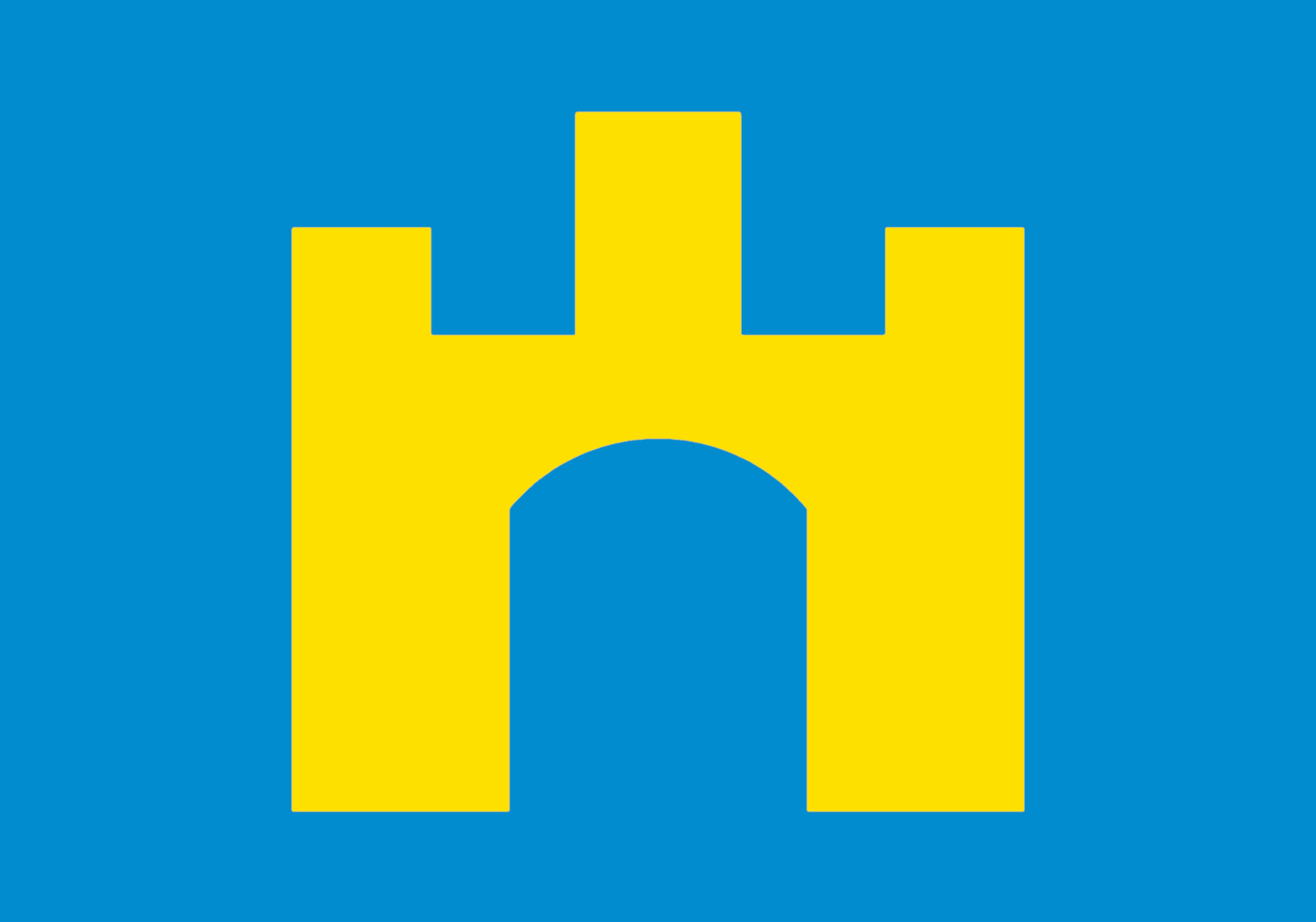
Sortland

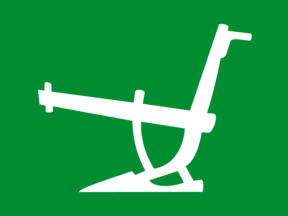
Stange

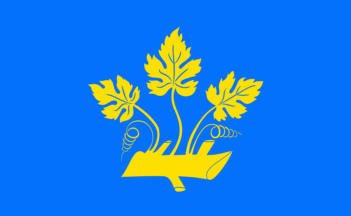
Stavanger

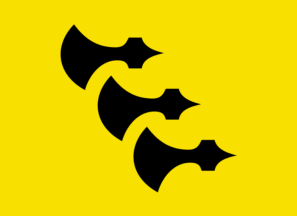
Steigen

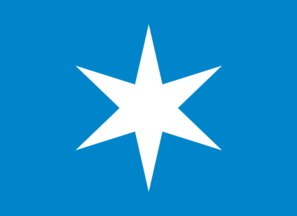
Steinkjer

Stjørdal

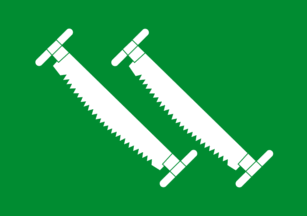
Stor-Elvdal

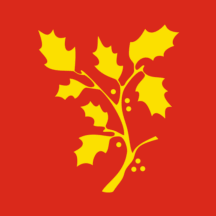
Stord

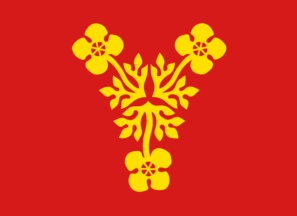
Storfjord

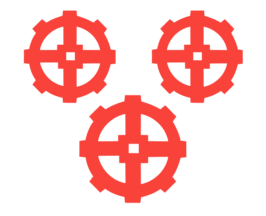
Strand

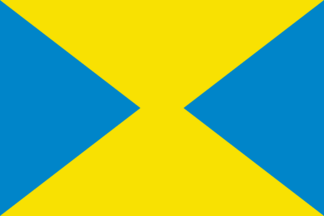
Stranda

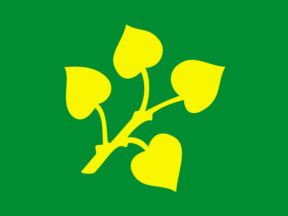
Stryn

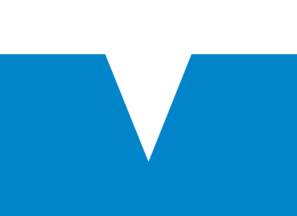
Sula

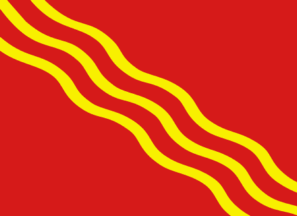
Suldal

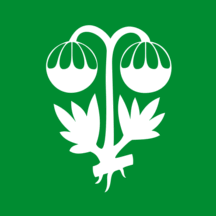
Sunndal

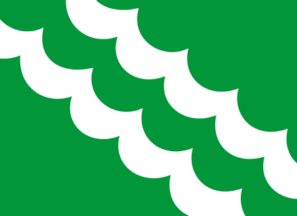
Surnadal

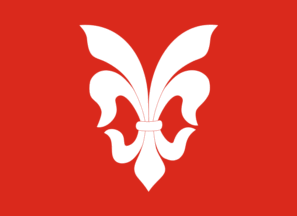
Sveio

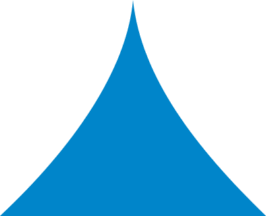
Sykkylven

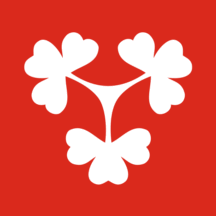
Sømna

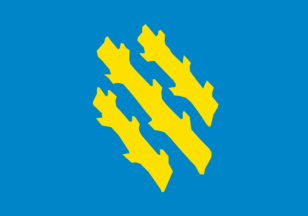
Søndre Land

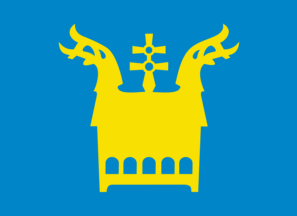
Sør-Aurdal

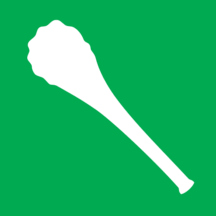
Sør-Fron

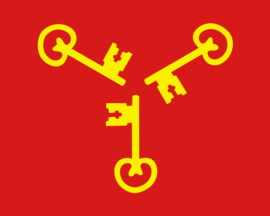
Sør-Odal

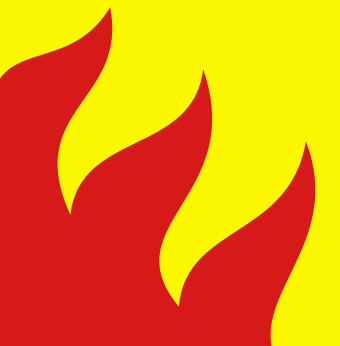
Sør-Varanger

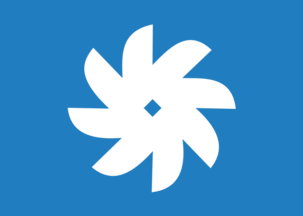
Sørfold

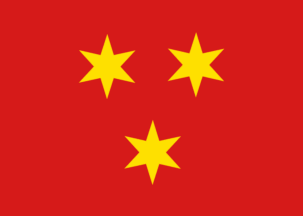
Sørreisa

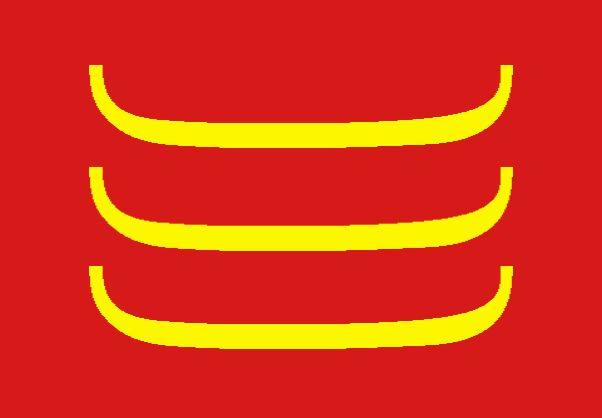
Tana

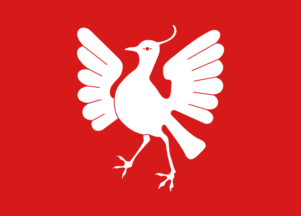
Time

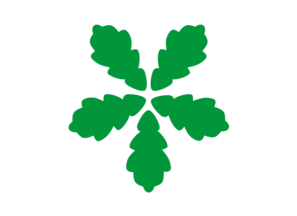
Tingvoll

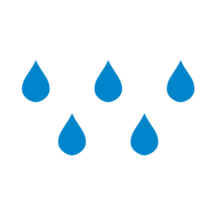
Tinn

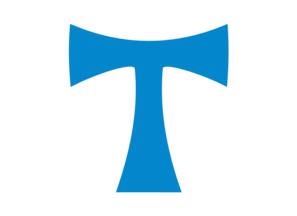
Tjeldsund

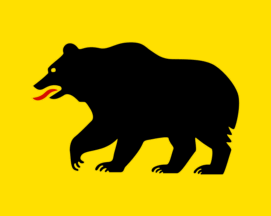
Tokke

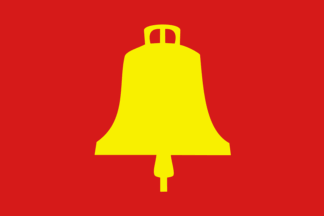
Tolga

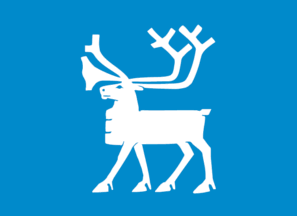
Tromsø

Trondheim (details)

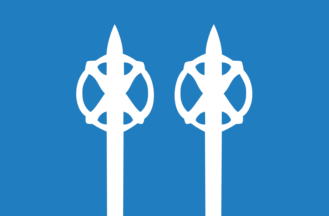
Trysil

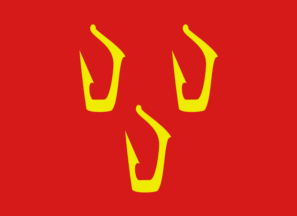
Træna

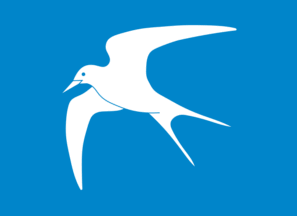
Tvedestrand

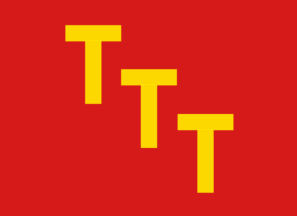
Tydal

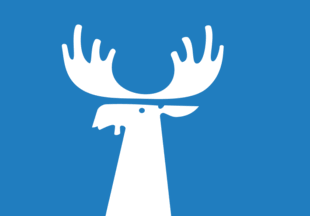
Tynset

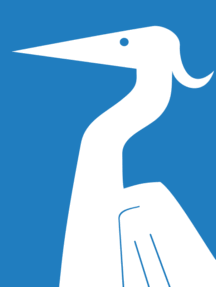
Tysvær

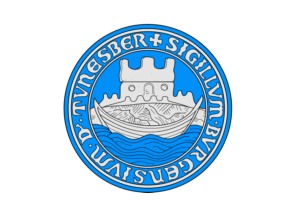
Tønsberg

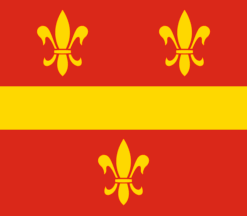
Ullensvang

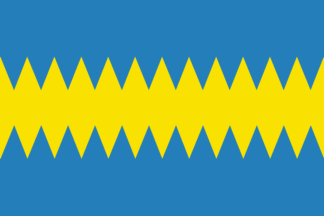
Ulstein

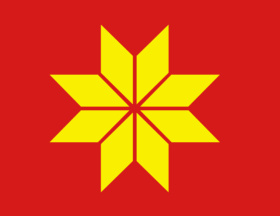
Ulvik

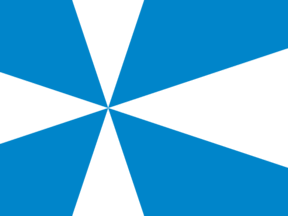
Utsira

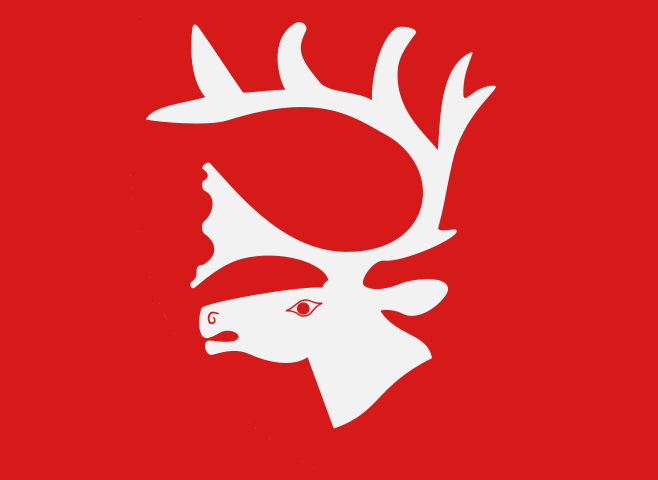
Vadsø

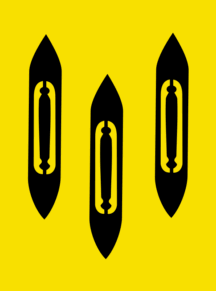
Vaksdal

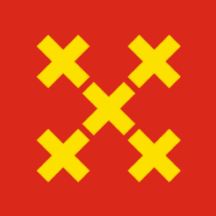
Valle

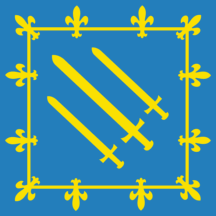
Vang

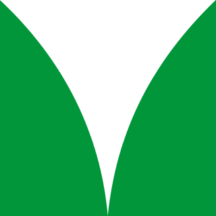
Vanylven

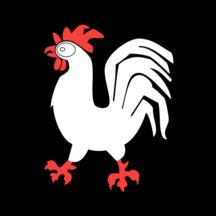
Vefsn

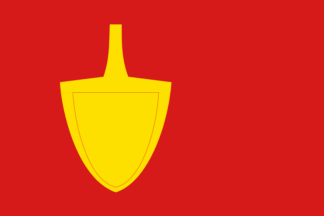
Vega

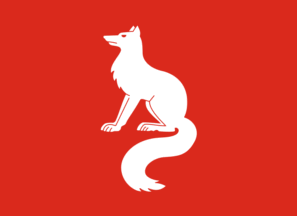
Vegårshei

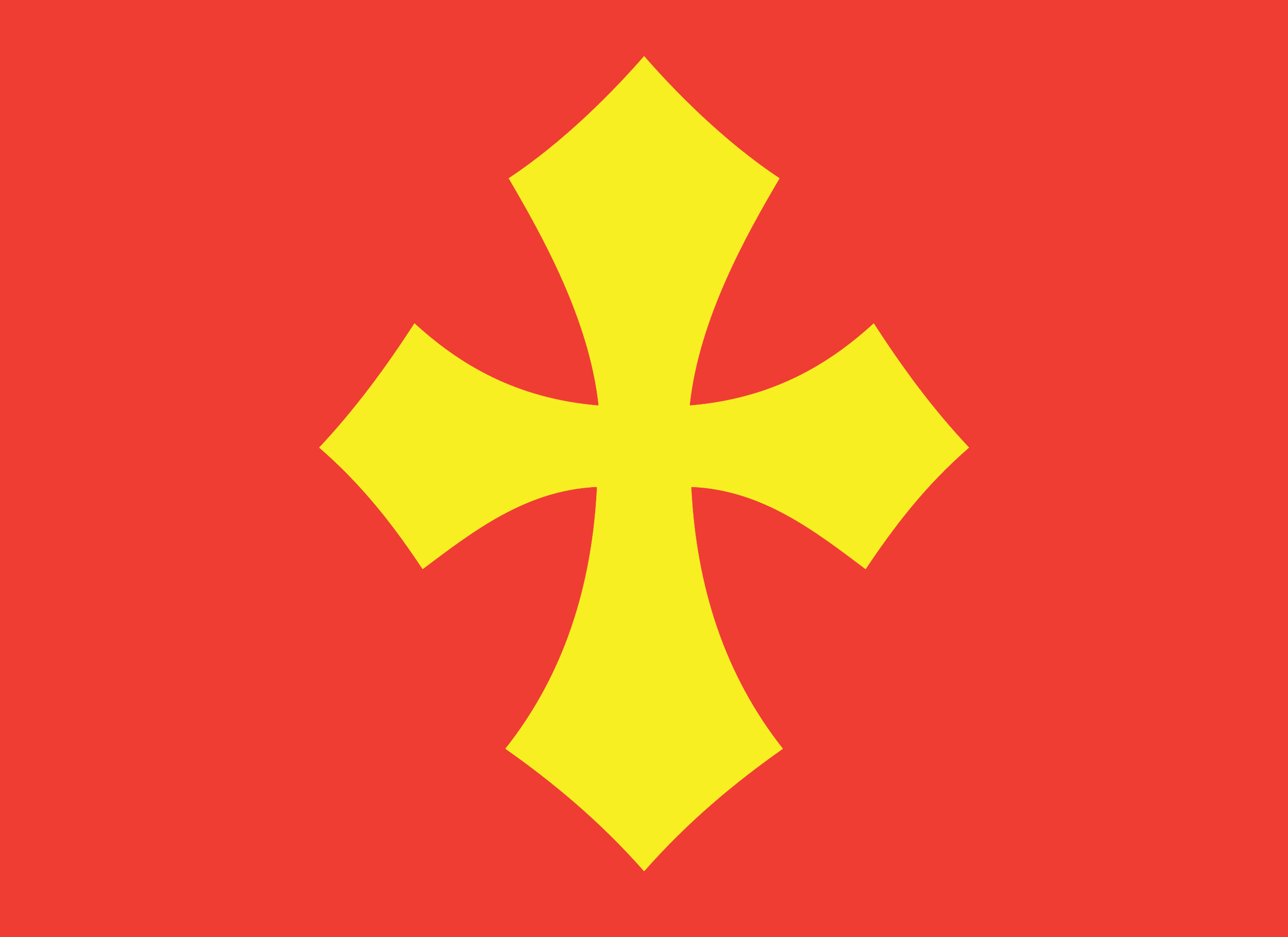
Verdal

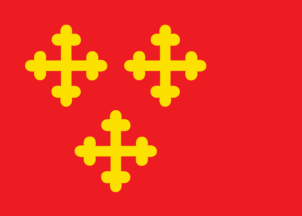
Vestby

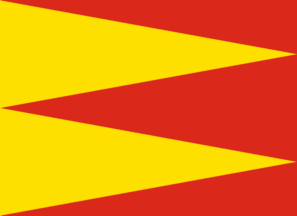
Vestnes

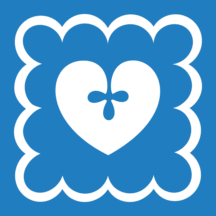
Vestre Slidre

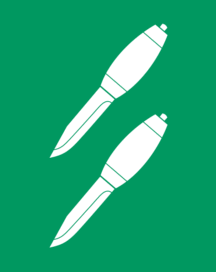
Vestre Toten

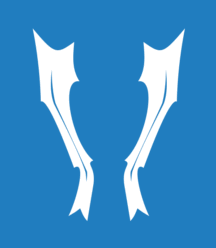
Vestvågøy

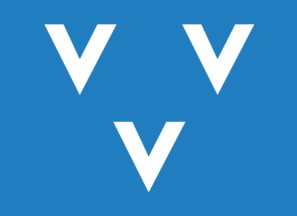
Vevelstad

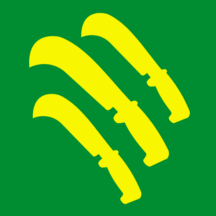
Vik

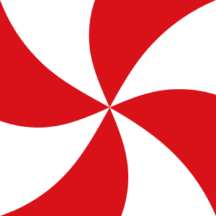
Vindafjord

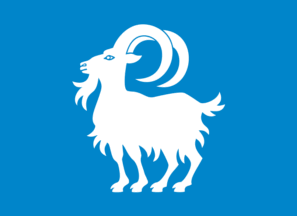
Vinje

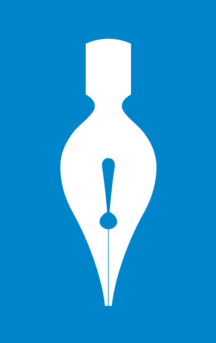
Volda

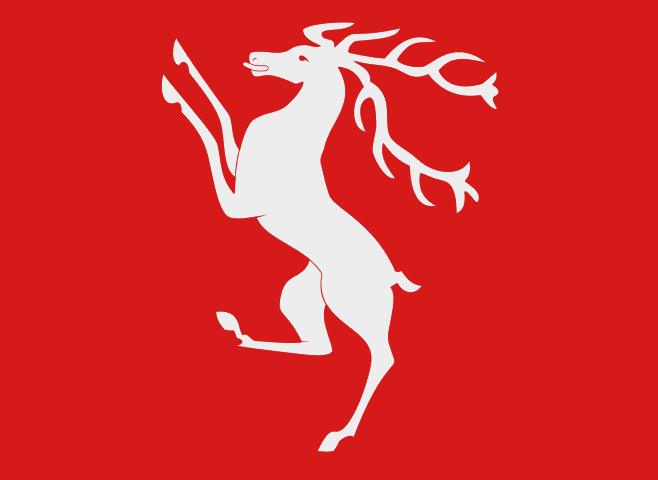
Voss

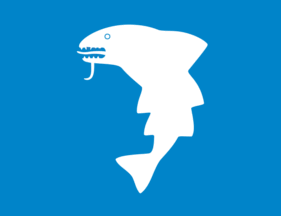
Vågan

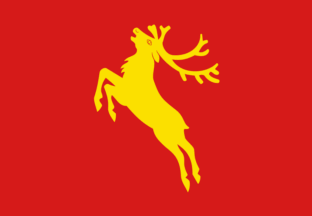
Vågå

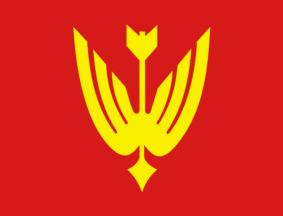
Våler

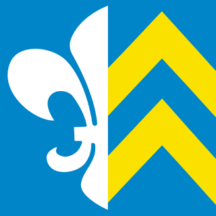
Våler

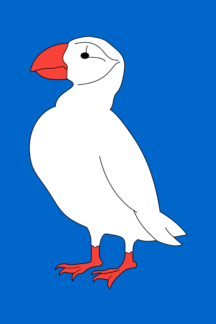
Værøy

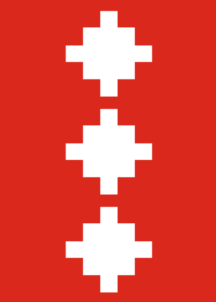
Ål

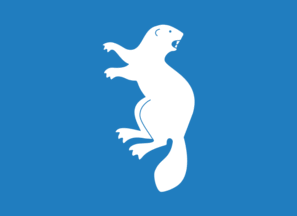
Åmli

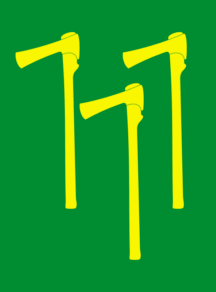
Åmot

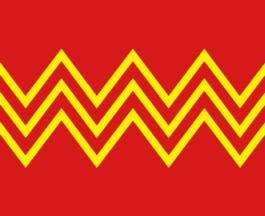
Årdal

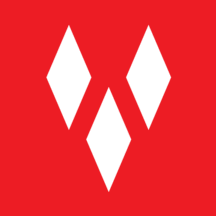
Ås

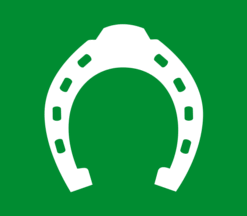
Åseral

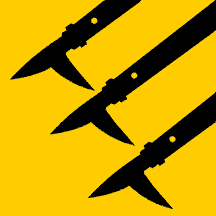
Åsnes

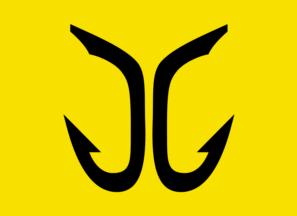
Øksnes

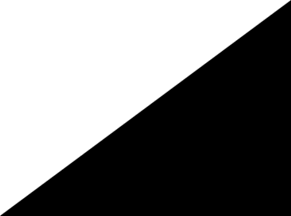
Ørland

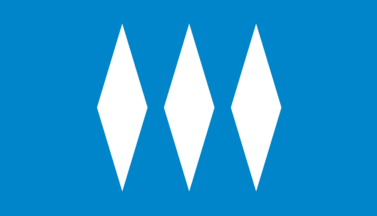
Ørsta

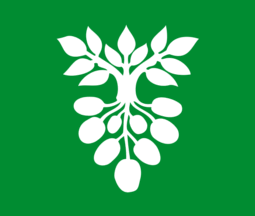
Østre Toten

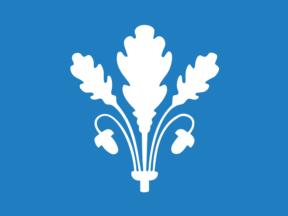
Øvre Eiker

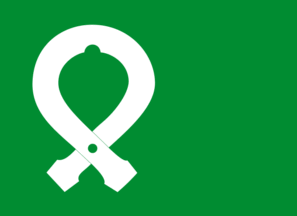
Øyer

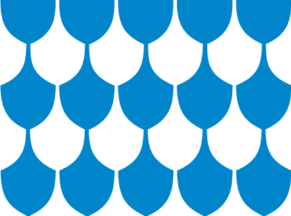
Øystre Slidre

==== Historical ====
Oslo (1924–2007)

=== Sweden ===
Borås

Gnesta

Gothenburg

Högsby

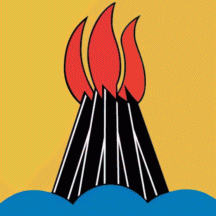
Huddinge

Kalmar

Kävlinge

Kil

Köping

Ludvika

Oskarshamn

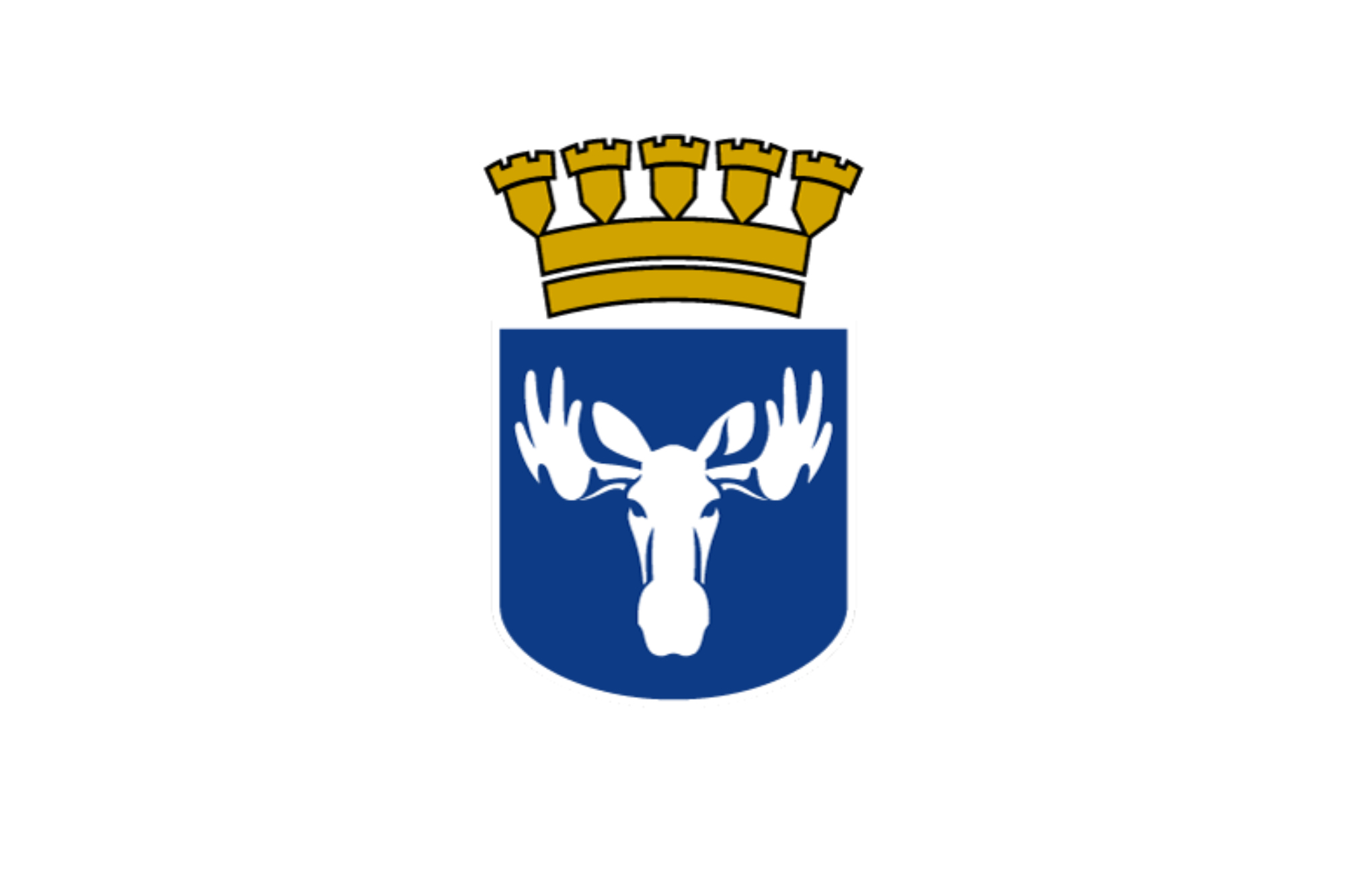
Östersund

Pajala

Stockholm

Täby

Töreboda

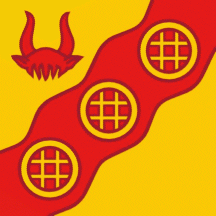
Tyresö

== Western Europe ==
=== Andorra ===
Andorra la Vella

Canillo

Encamp

Escaldes-Engordany

La Massana

Ordino

San Juliá de Loria

=== Austria ===
Bischofshofen

Guntersdorf

Heiligenkreuz im Lafnitztal

Innsbruck

Kitzbühel

Litschau

Mattersburg

Salzburg

Sankt Pölten

Vienna

Vienna (state flag)

Vils

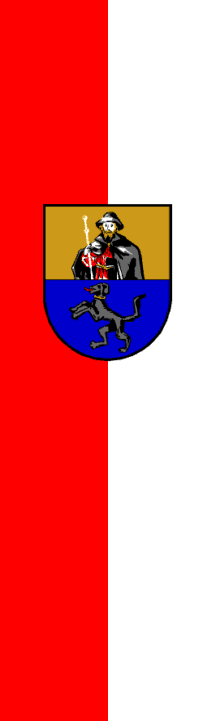
Werfen

Zell an der Pram

=== Belgium ===
Aalst

Aarschot

Andenne

Antoing

Ans

Antwerp

Arlon

Ath

Aubange

Bastogne

Beaumont

Beauraing

Beringen

Bilzen

Binche

Blankenberge

Borgloon

Bouillon

Braine-le-Comte

Bree

Bruges

Brussels

Charleroi

Châtelet

Chièvres

Chimay

Chiny

Ciney

Comines-Warneton

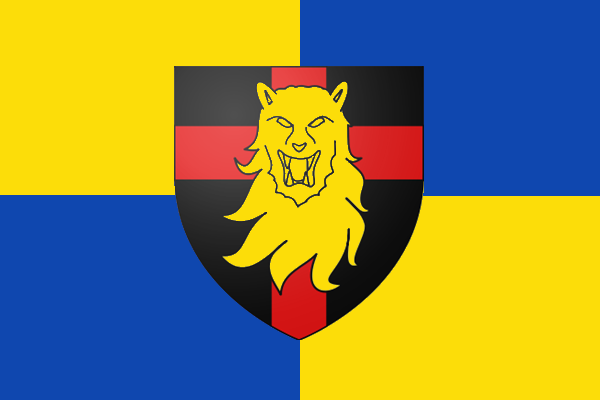
Couvin

Damme

Deinze

Dendermonde

Diest

Diksmuide

Dilsen-Stokkem

Dinant

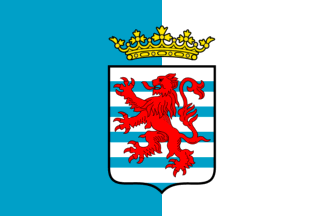
Durbuy

Eeklo

Enghien

Eupen

Fontaine-l'Évêque

Fosses-la-Ville

Geel

Gembloux

Genappe

Genk

Geraardsbergen

Ghent

Gistel

Halen

Halle

Hamont-Achel

Hannut

Harelbeke

Hasselt

Herk-de-Stad

Herentals

Herstal

Herve

Hoogstraten

Houffalize

Huy

Izegem

Jodoigne

Kortrijk

La Louvière

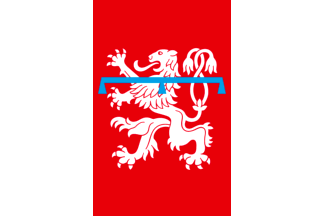
La Roche-en-Ardenne

Landen

Le Rœulx

Lessines

Leuven

Leuze-en-Hainaut

Liège

Lier

Limbourg

Lokeren

Lommel

Lo-Reninge

Maaseik

Malmedy

Marche-en-Famenne

Mechelen

Menen

Mesen

Mons

Mortsel

Mouscron

Namur

Neufchâteau

Nieuwpoort

Ninove

Nivelles

Ostend

Ottignies-Louvain-la-Neuve

Oudenaarde

Oudenburg

Peer

Péruwelz

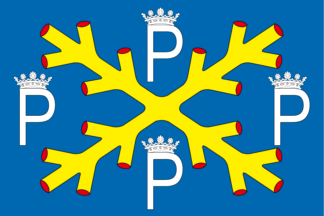
Philippeville

Poperinge

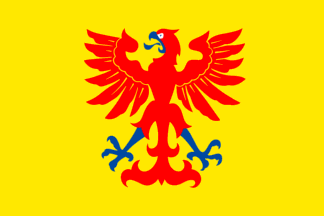
Rochefort

Roeselare

Ronse

Saint-Ghislain

Saint-Hubert

Sambreville

St. Vith

Scherpenheuvel-Zichem

Seraing

Sint-Niklaas

Sint-Truiden

Soignies

Spa

Stavelot

Thuin

Tielt

Tienen

Tongeren

Torhout

Tournai

Tubize

Turnhout

Verviers

Veurne

Vilvoorde

Virton

Visé

Walcourt

Waregem

Wavre

Wervik

Ypres

Zottegem

Zoutleeuw

=== France ===
Aix-en-Provence

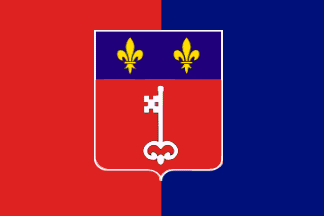
Angers

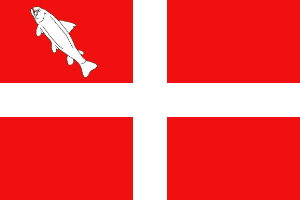
Annecy

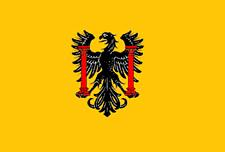
Besançon

Bastia

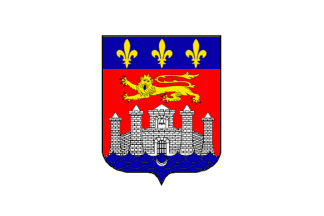
Bordeaux

Brest

Clermont-Ferrand

Dijon

Grenoble

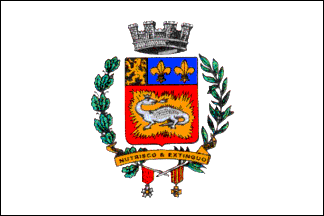
Le Havre

Lyon

Marseille

Metz

Montpellier

Mulhouse

Nantes

Nice

Orléans

Paris

Rennes

Reims

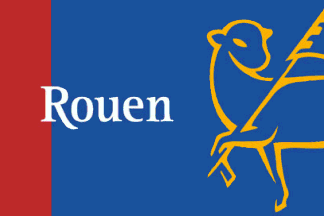
Rouen

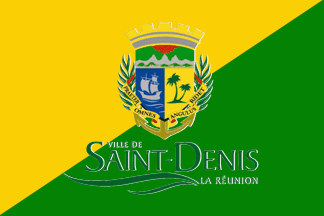
Saint-Denis

Saint-Étienne

Strasbourg

Toulouse

Toulon

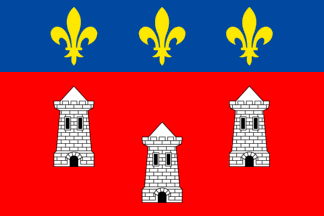
Tours

=== Germany ===
Aachen

Ansbach

Augsburg

Bamberg

Bayreuth

Bergisch Gladbach

Berlin

Bielefeld

Bochum

Bonn

Bottrop

Braunschweig

Bremen

Bremerhaven

Celle

Chemnitz

Coburg

Cologne

Cottbus

Darmstadt

Dortmund

Dresden

Duisburg

Düsseldorf

Erfurt

Essen

Erlangen

Frankfurt

Freiburg im Breisgau

Fürth

Gelsenkirchen

Gera

Görlitz

Göttingen

Gütersloh

Hagen

Hamburg

Hamm

Heilbronn

Herne

Hanover

Heidelberg

Heilbronn

Hildesheim

Ingolstadt

Jena

Karlsruhe

Kassel

Kaufbeuren

Kempten

Kiel

Koblenz

Konstanz

Krefeld

Landshut

Leipzig

Leverkusen

Ludwigshafen

Lübeck

Magdeburg

Mainz

Mannheim

Memmingen

Moers

Mönchengladbach

Mülheim

Munich (striped variant)

Munich (lozengy variant)

Münster

Neuss

Nuremberg

Oberhausen

Offenbach am Main

Oldenburg

Osnabrück

Paderborn

Papenburg

Passau

Pforzheim

Potsdam

Recklinghausen

Regensburg

Reutlingen

Rosenheim

Rostock

Saarbrücken

Salzgitter

Schwerin

Siegen

Solingen

Stralsund

Stuttgart

Trier

Ulm

Weißenfels

Westerstede

Wismar

Witten

Wolfsburg

Wuppertal

Würzburg

Zwickau

=== Ireland ===
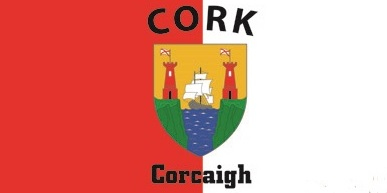
Cork

Drogheda

Dublin

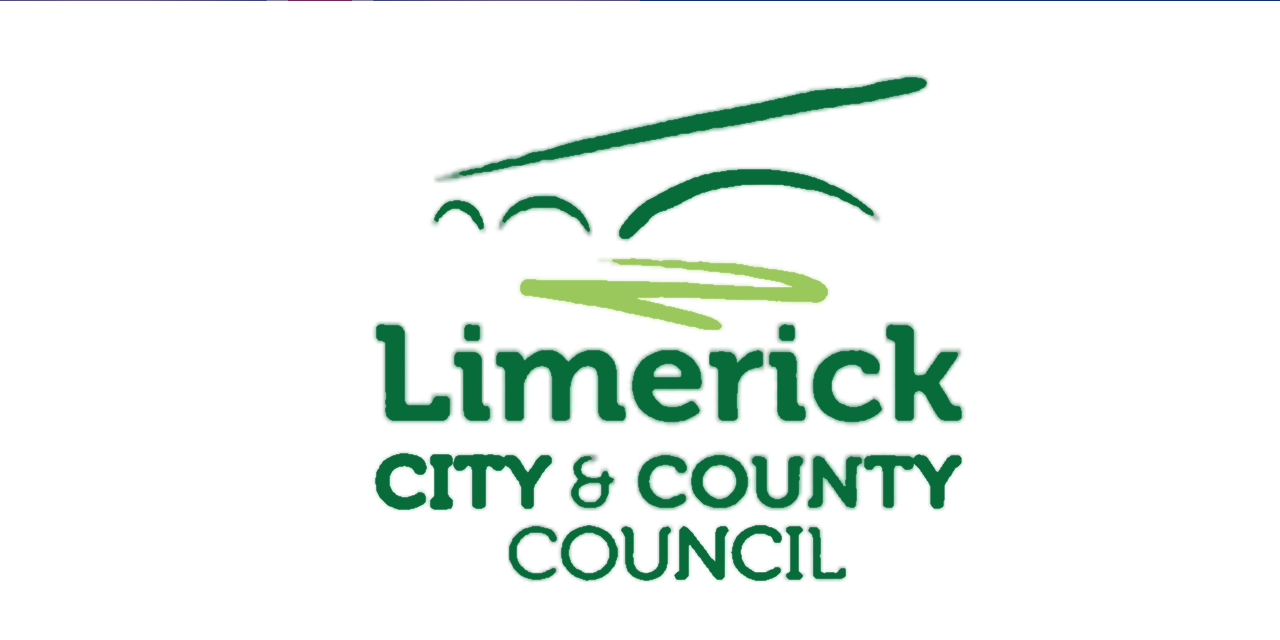
Limerick

Tullamore

=== Liechtenstein ===
==== Municipalities ====
Balzers

Eschen

Gamprin

Mauren

Planken

Ruggell

Schaan

Schellenberg

Triesen

Triesenberg

Vaduz

=== Luxembourg ===
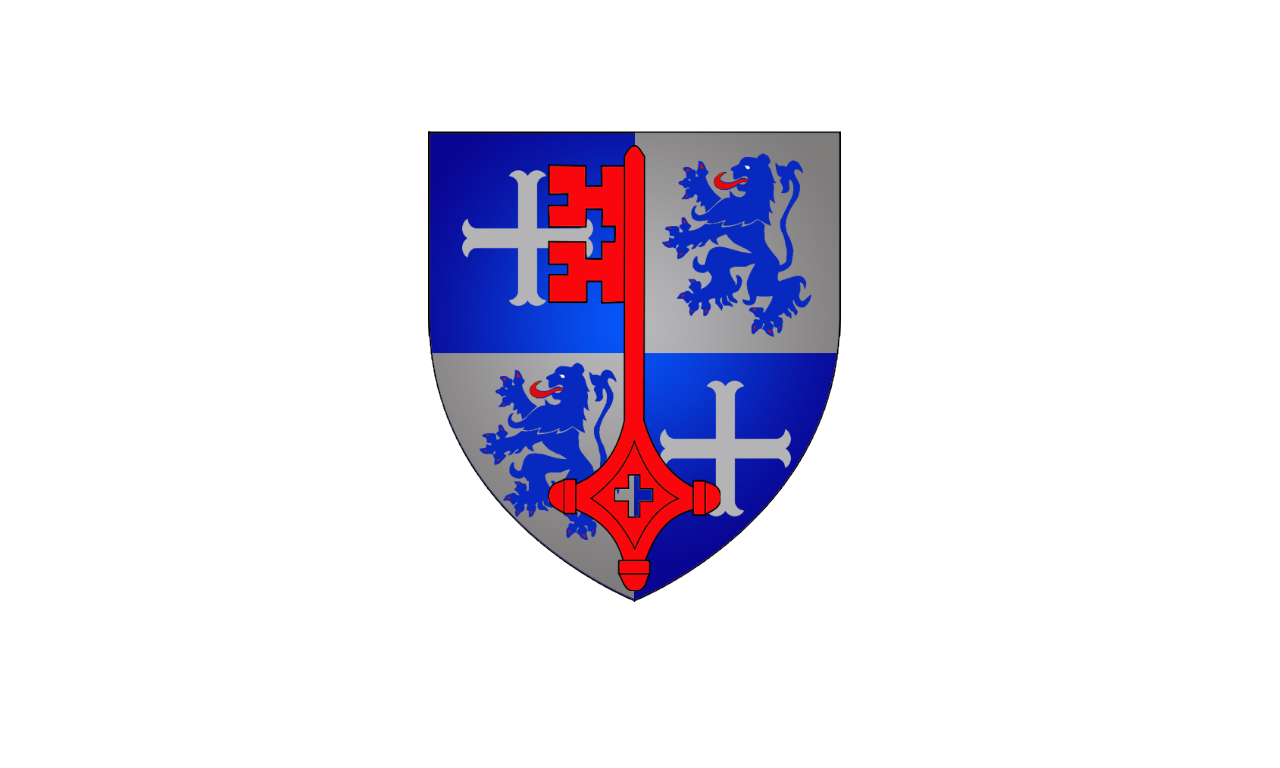
Betzdorf

Diekirch

Luxembourg City

Vianden

=== Portugal ===
==== Cities and civil parishes (which do not exist as municipalities) ====
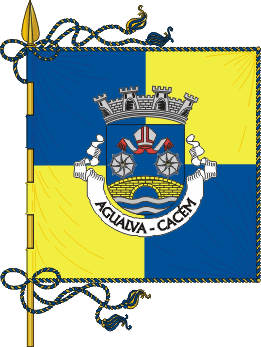
Agualva-Cacém

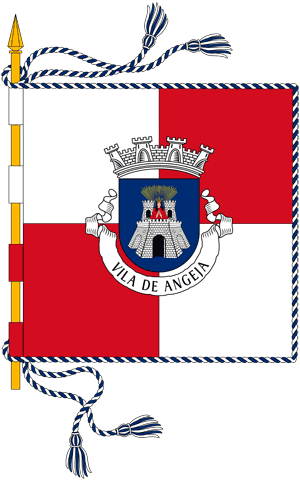
Angeja

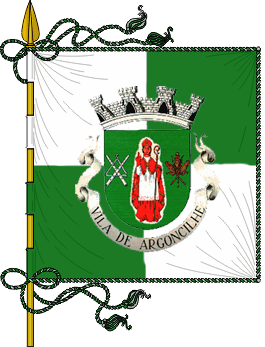
Argoncilhe

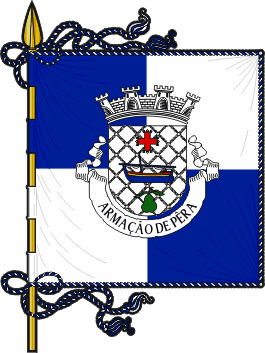
Armação de Pêra

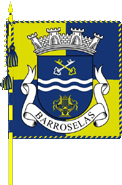
Barroselas

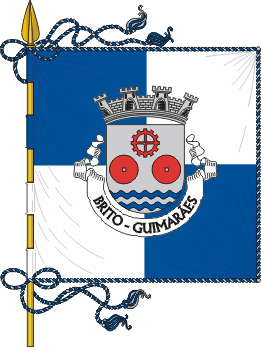
Brito

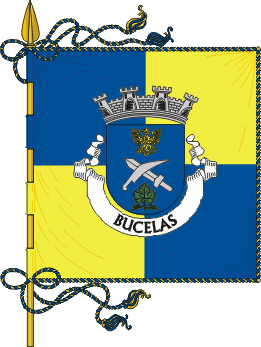
Bucelas

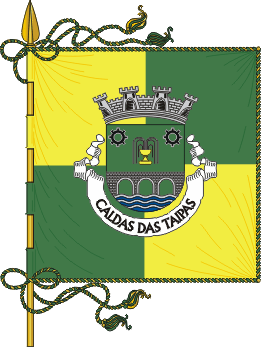
Caldas das Taipas

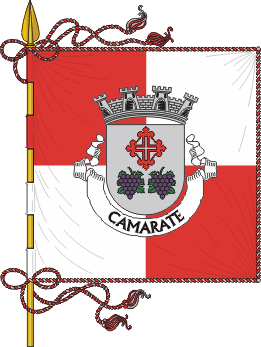
Camarate

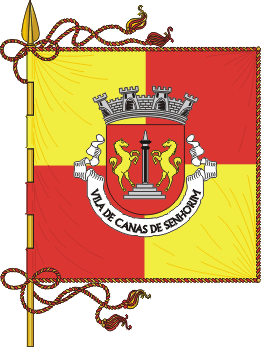
Canas de Senhorim

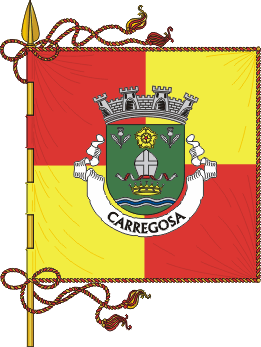
Carregosa

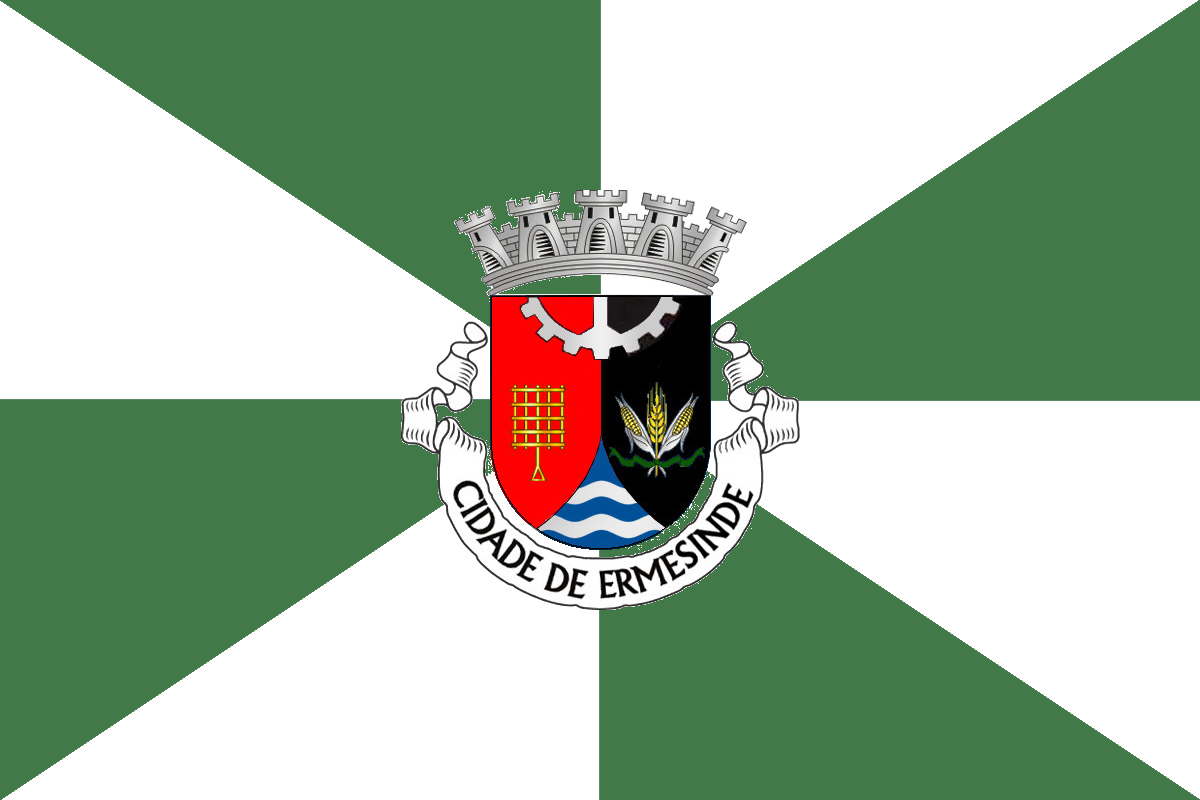
Ermesinde

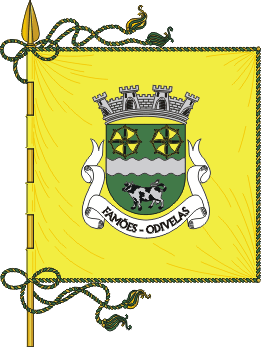
Famões

Fátima

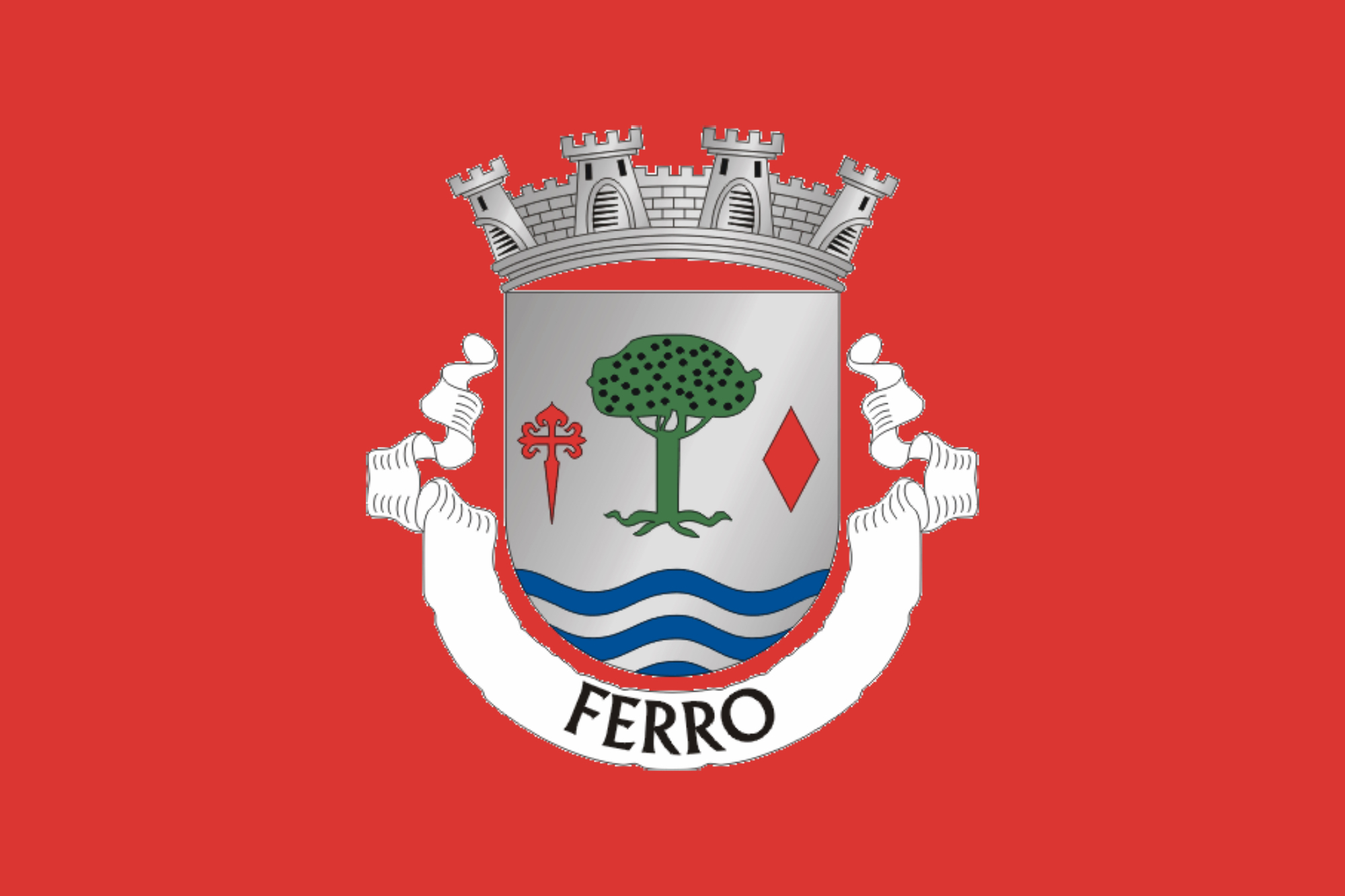
Ferro

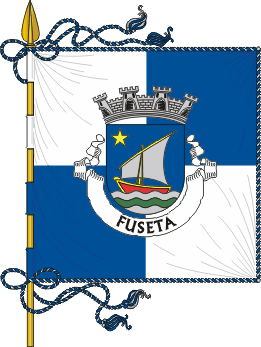
Fuseta

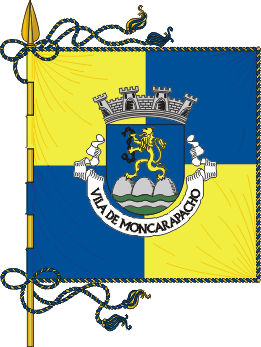
Moncarapacho

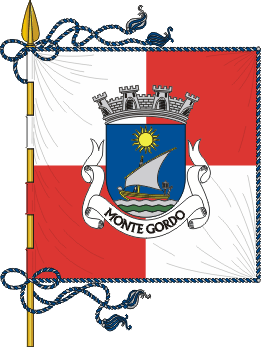
Monte Gordo

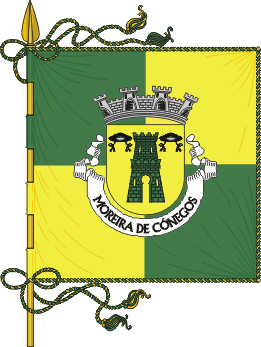
Moreira de Cónegos

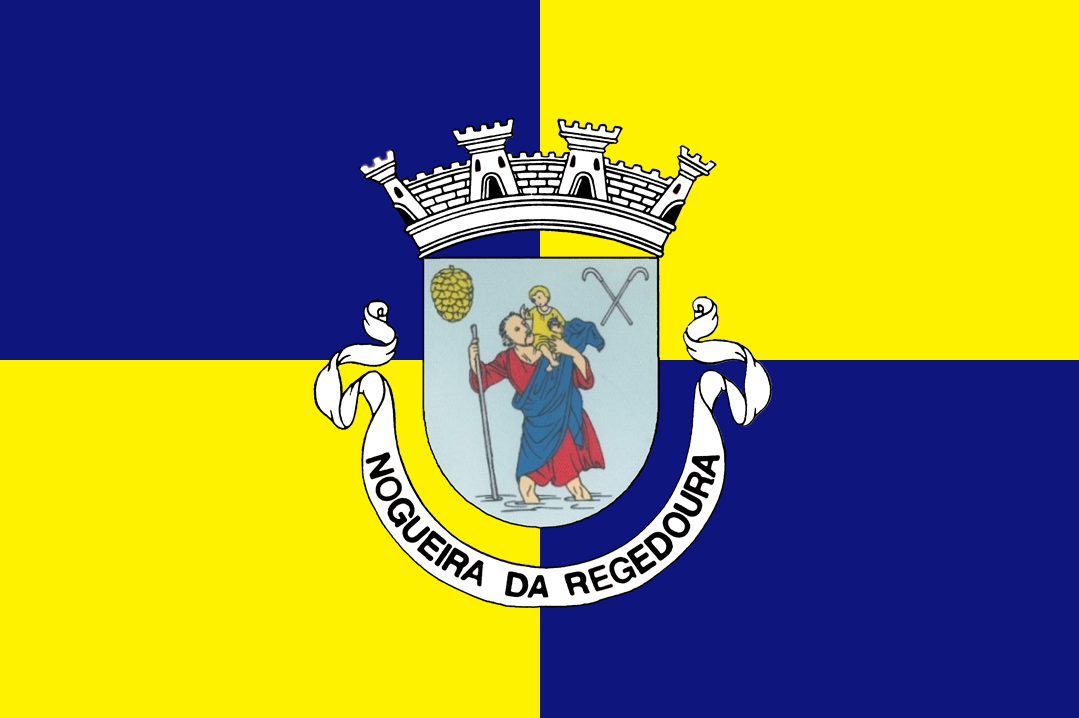
Nogueira da Regedoura

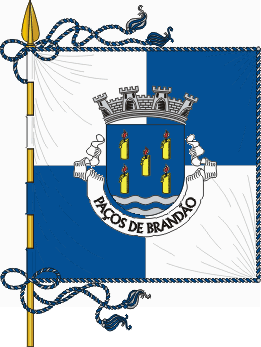
Paços de Brandão

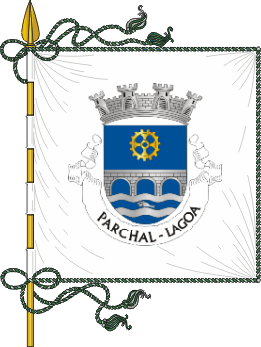
Parchal

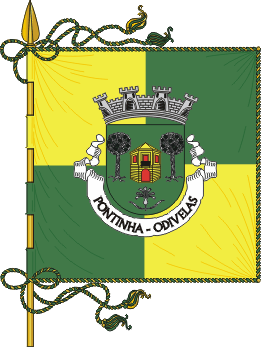
Pontinha

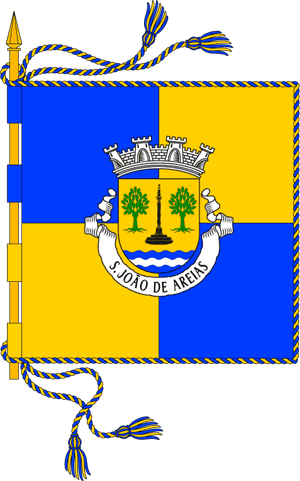
São João de Areias

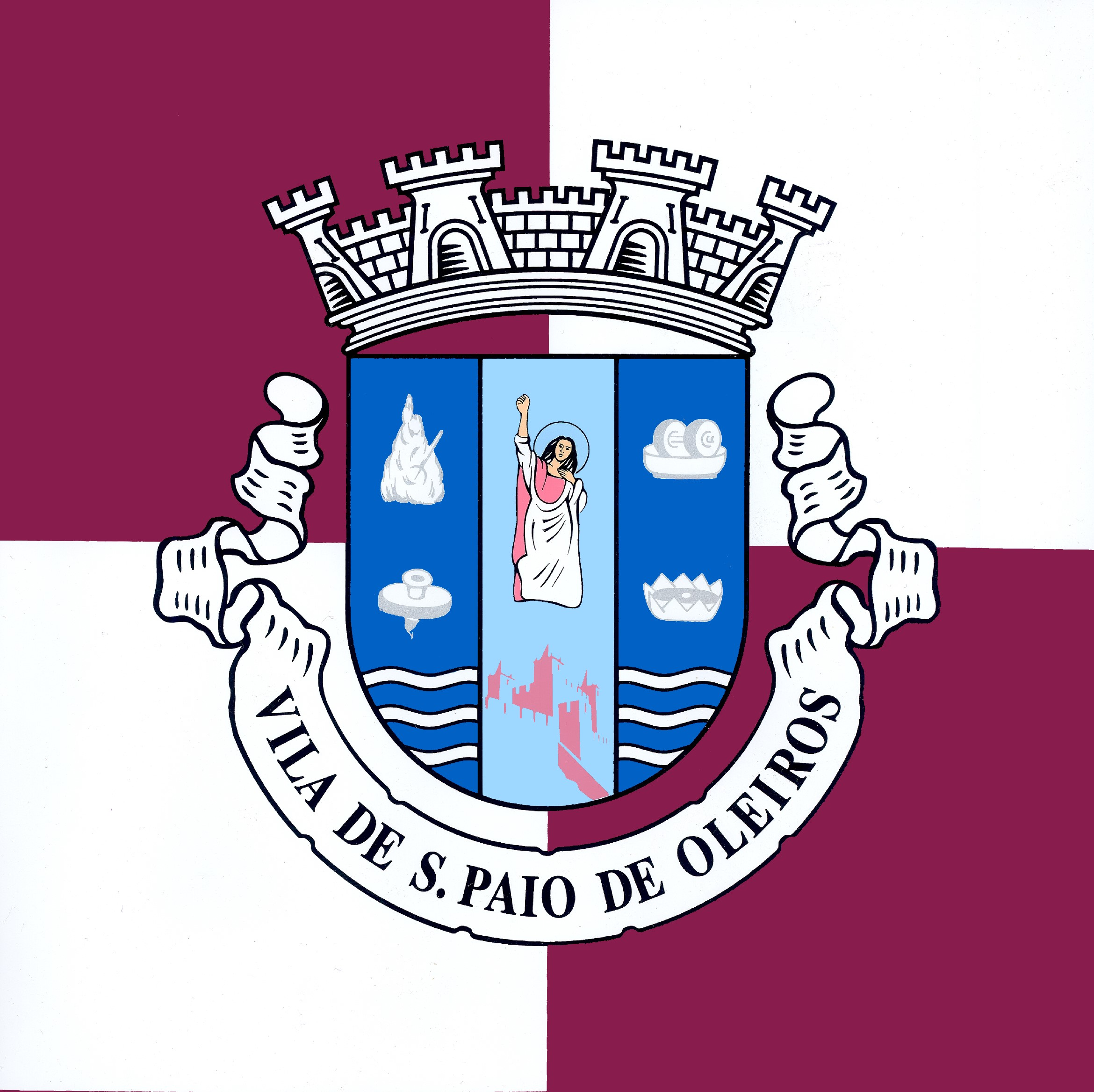
São Paio de Oleiros

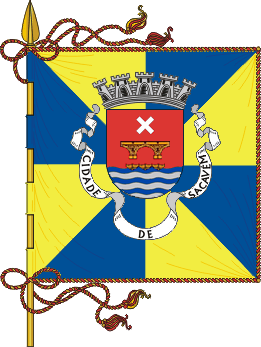
Sacavém

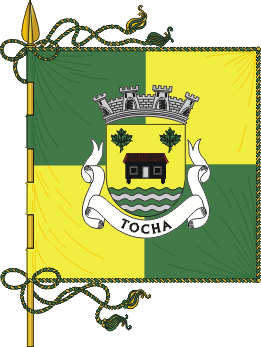
Tocha

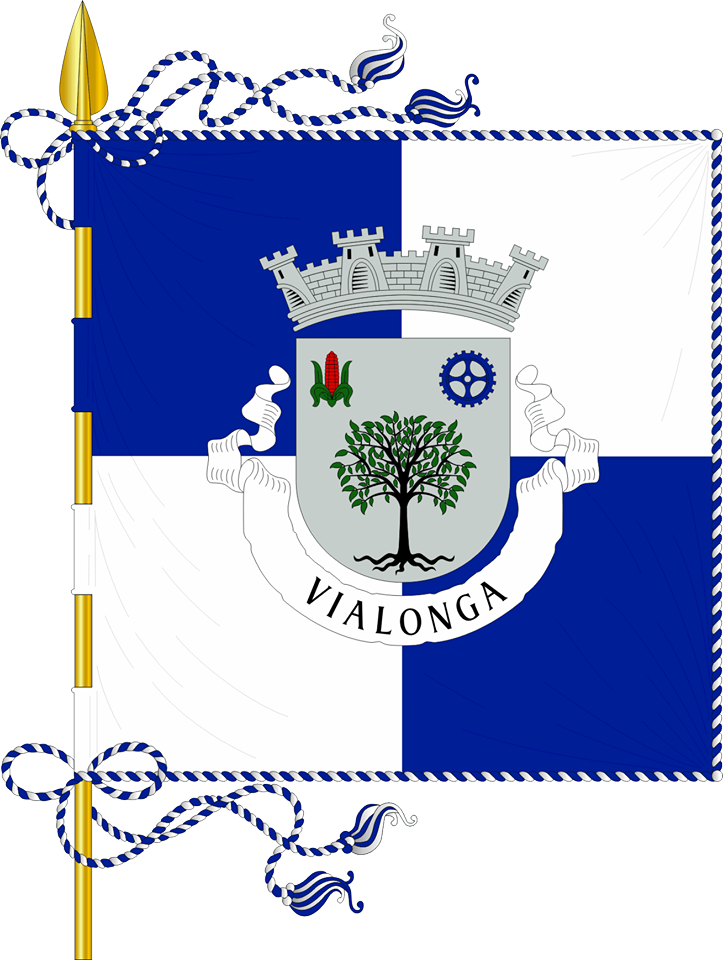
Vialonga

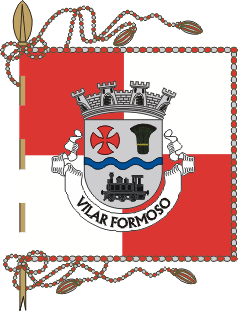
Vilar Formoso

=== Monaco ===
Monaco

== Southern Europe ==
=== Albania ===
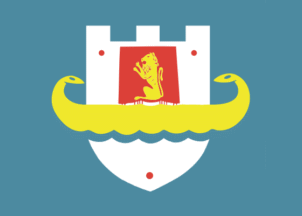
Durrës

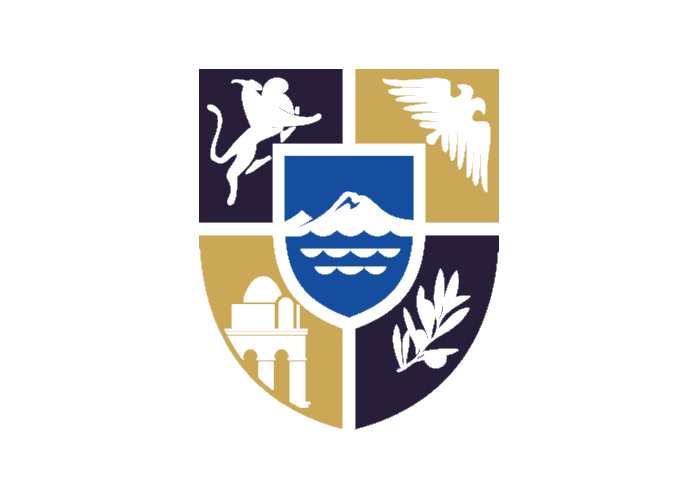
Himara

Kavajë (details)

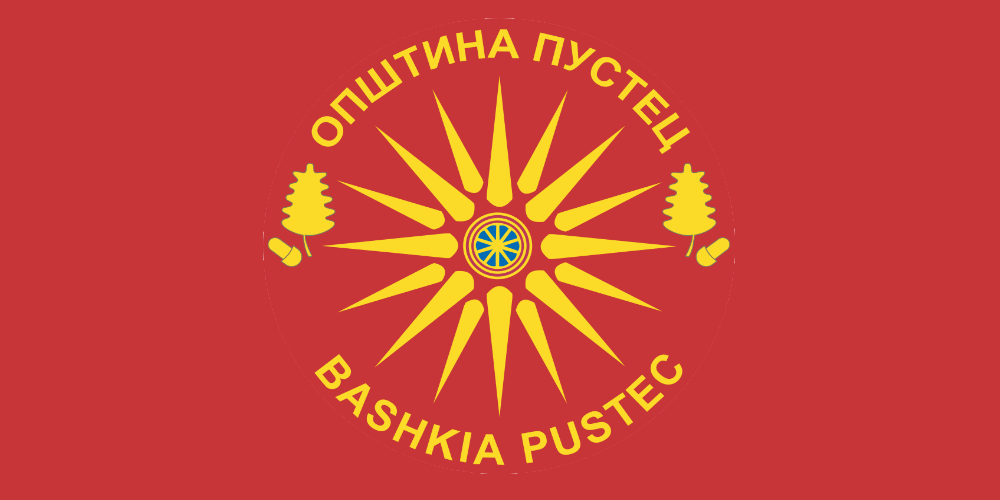
Pustec

Shkodër

Tirana

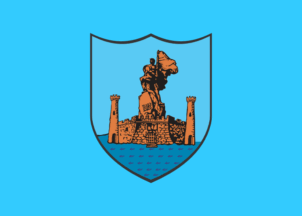
Vlore

=== Bosnia and Herzegovina ===
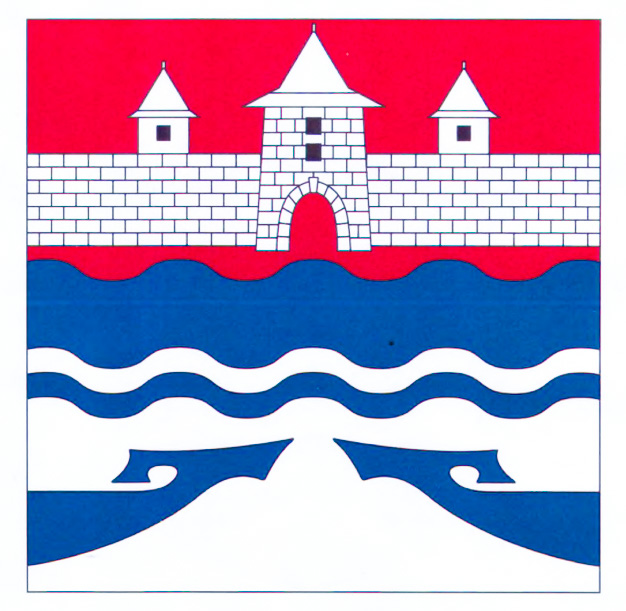
Banja Luka

Čapljina

Cazin

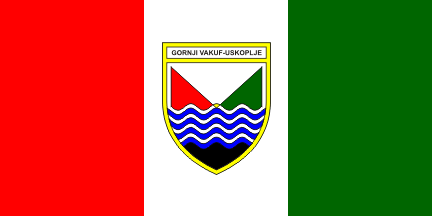
Gornji Vakuf-Uskoplje

Istočno Sarajevo

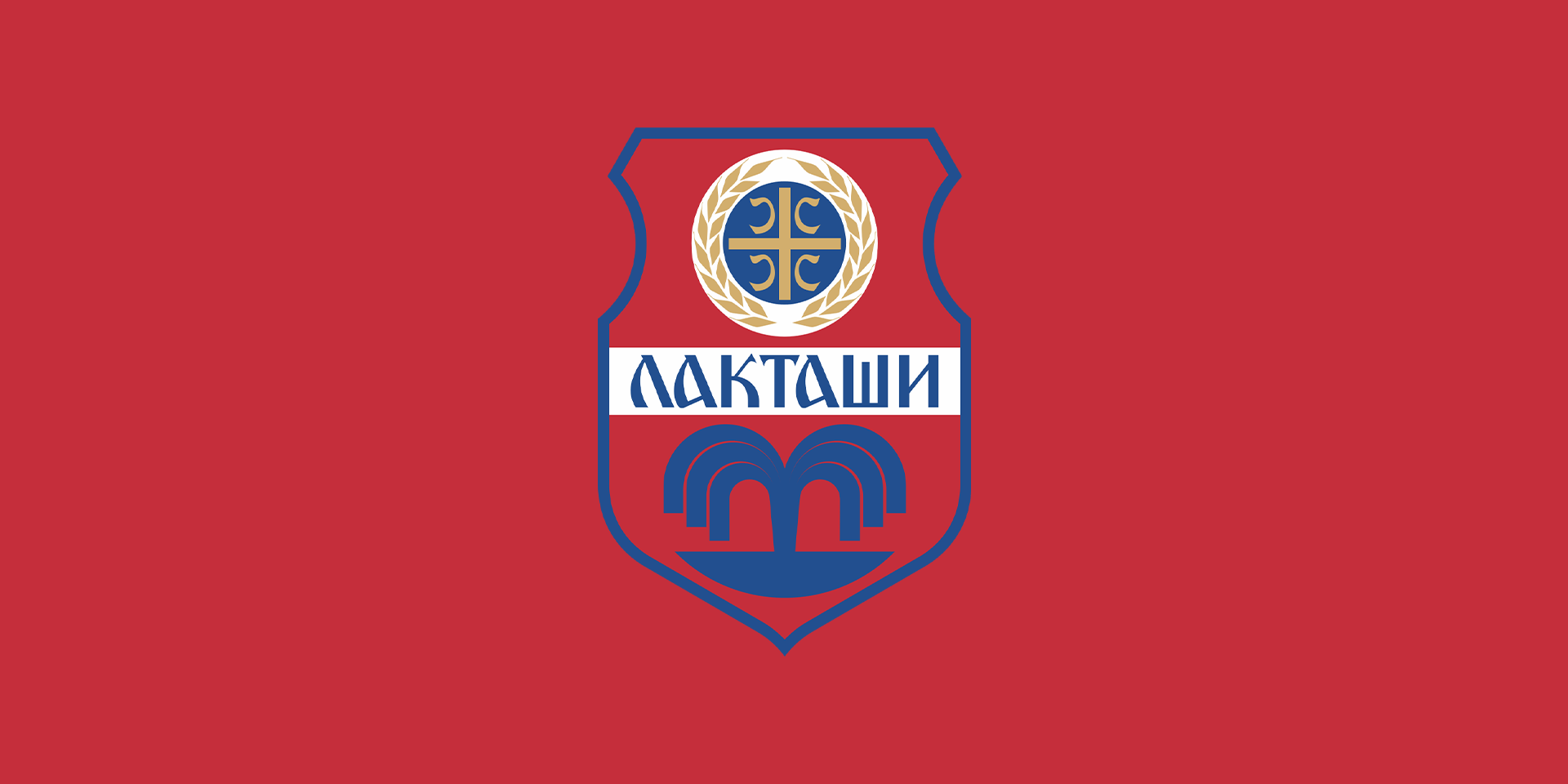
Laktaši

Livno

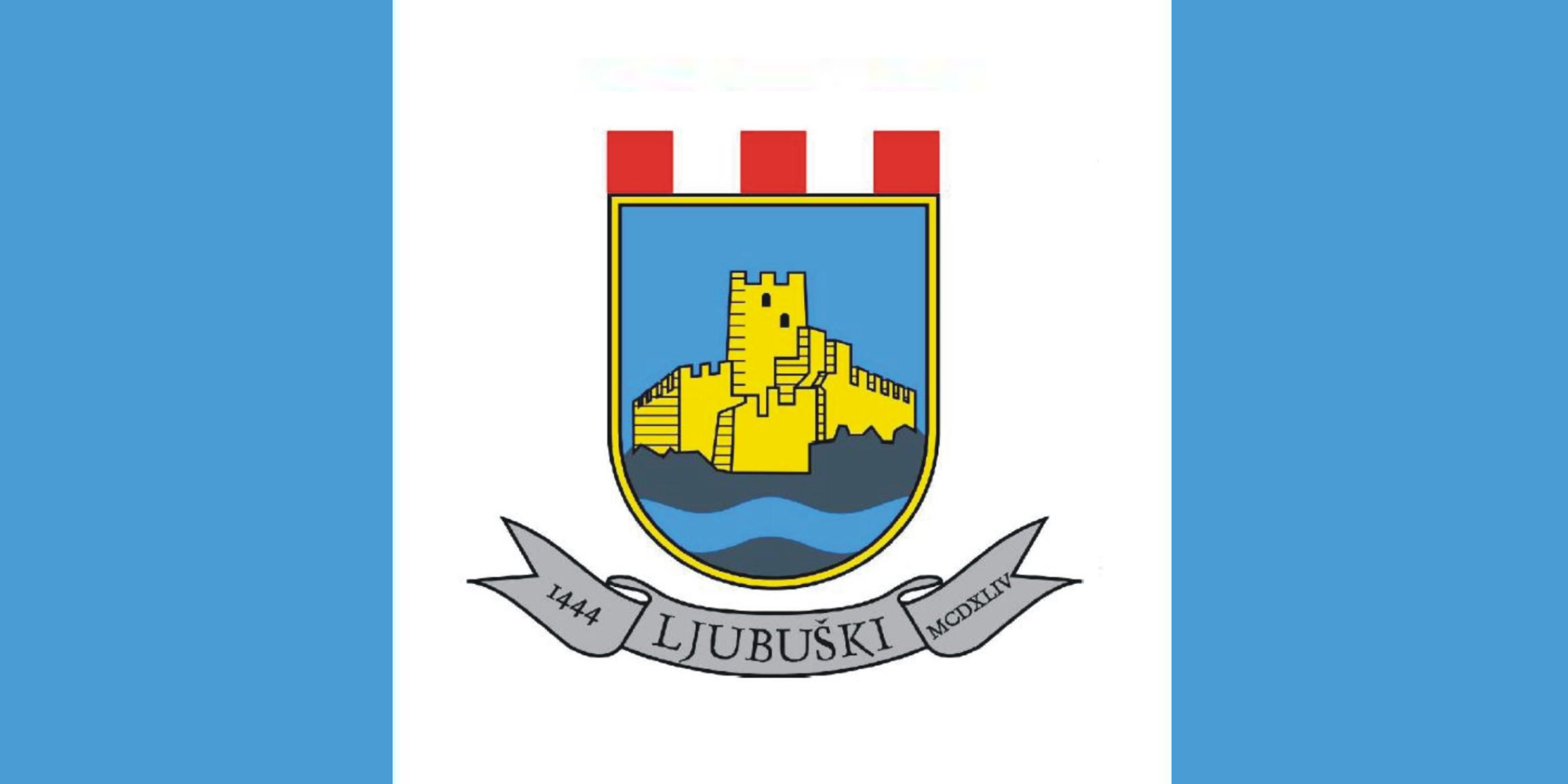
Ljubuški

Mostar

Novi Travnik

Posušje

Prijedor

Sarajevo

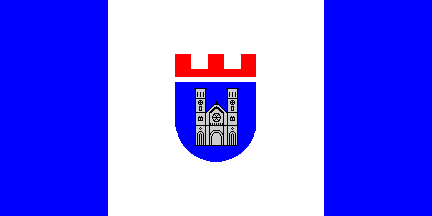
Široki Brijeg

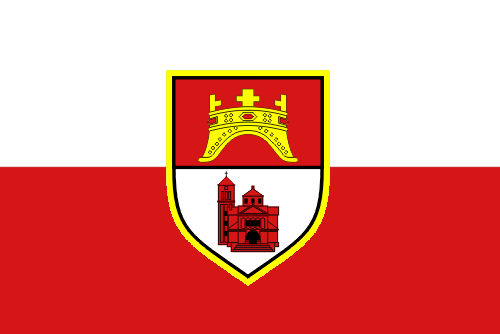
Tomislavgrad

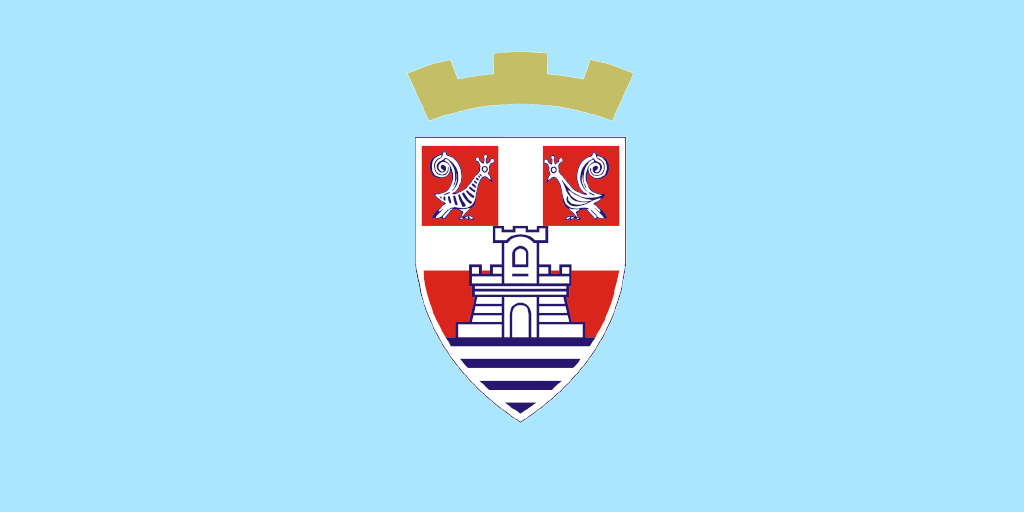
Trebinje

Tuzla

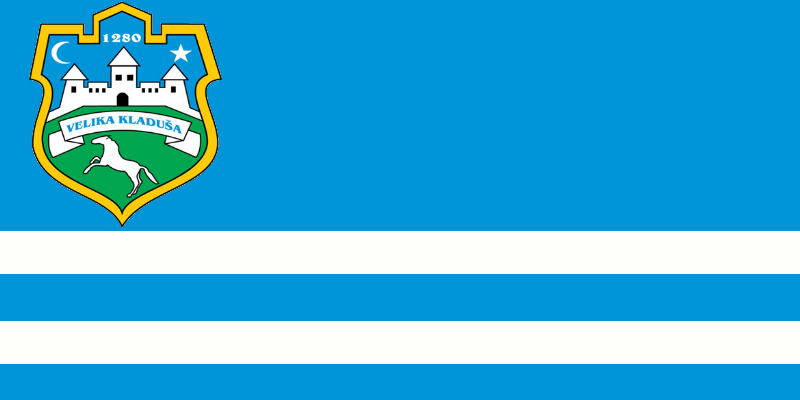
Velika Kladuša

Vitez

Zenica (details)

Žepče

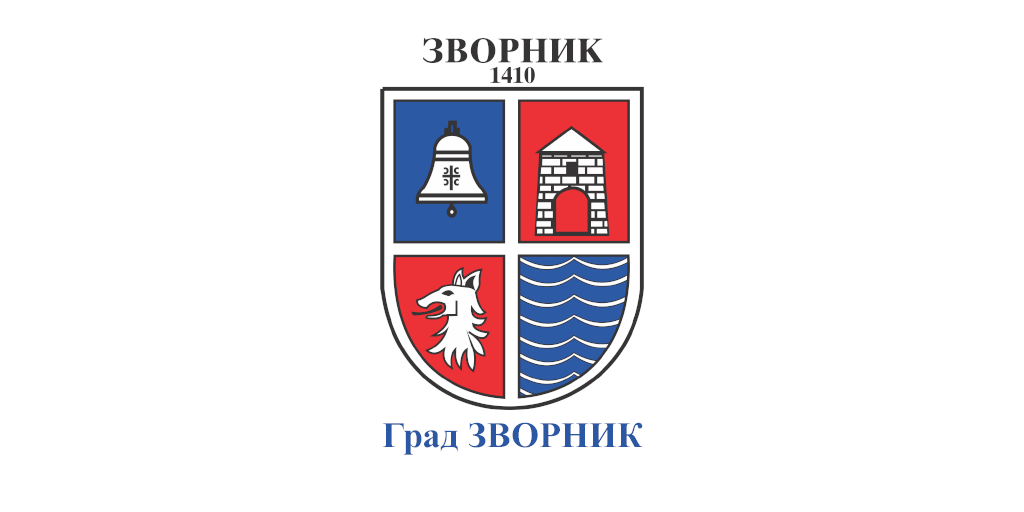
Zvornik

=== Bulgaria ===
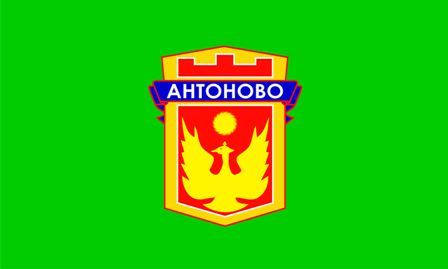
Antonovo

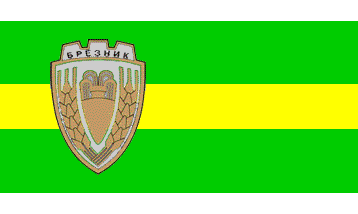
Breznik

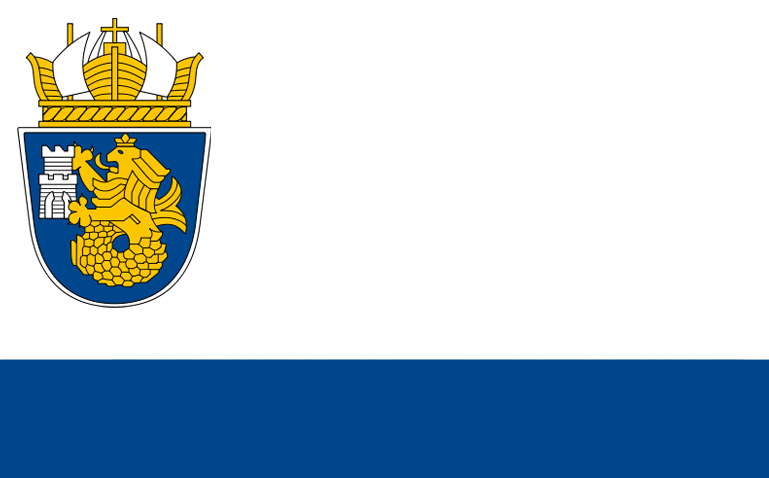
Burgas

Dobrich

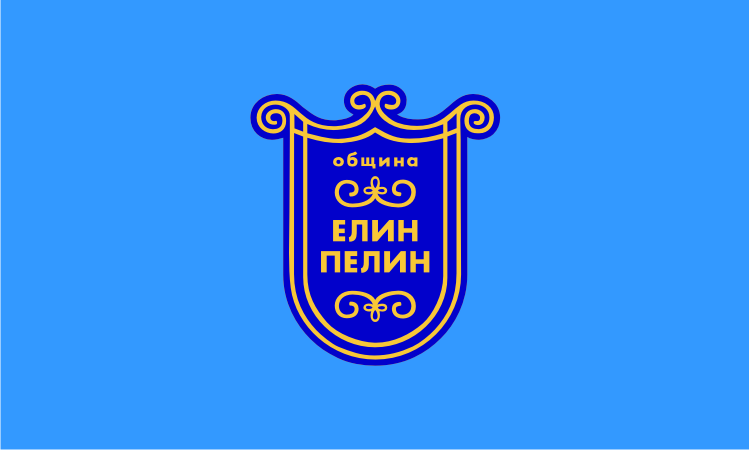
Elin Pelin

Gabrovo

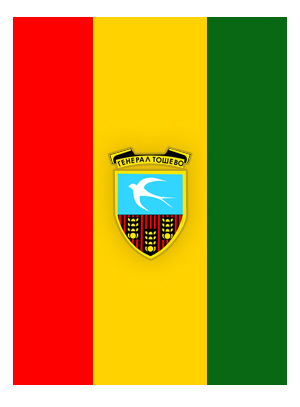
General Toshevo

Kyustendil

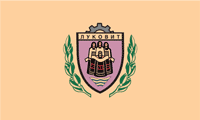
Lovech

Pernik

Plovdiv

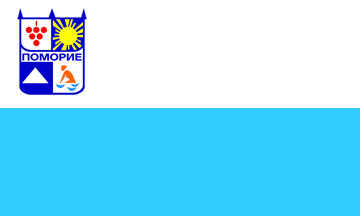
Pomorie

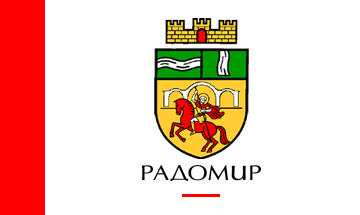
Radomir

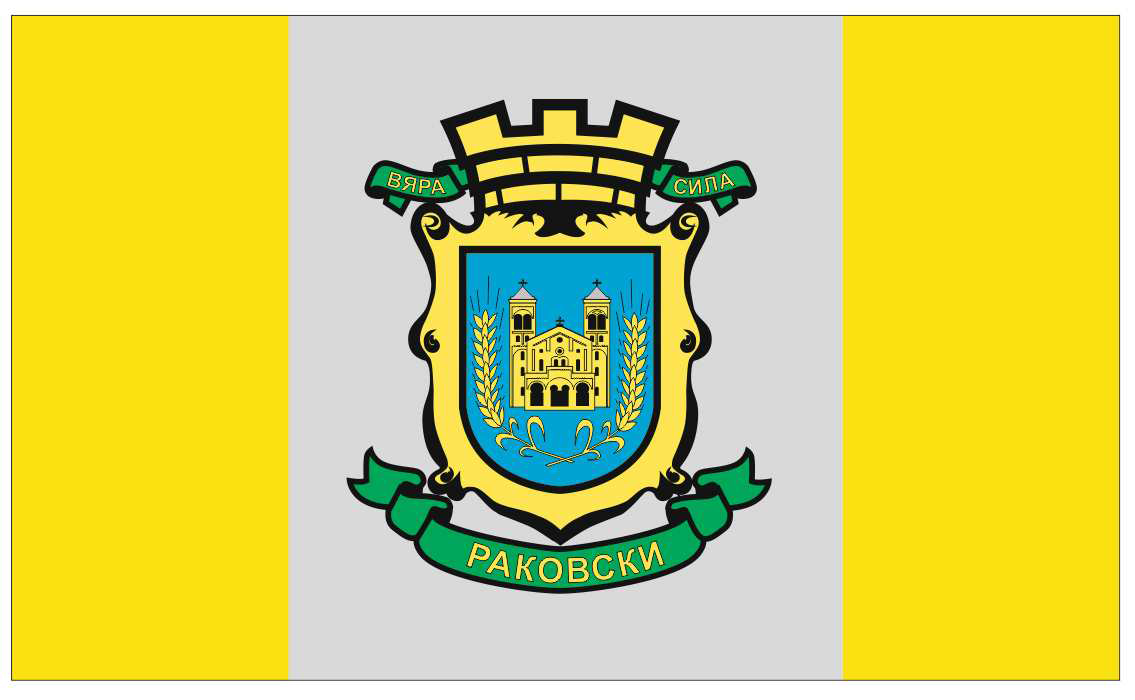
Rakovski

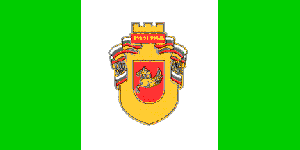
Razgrad

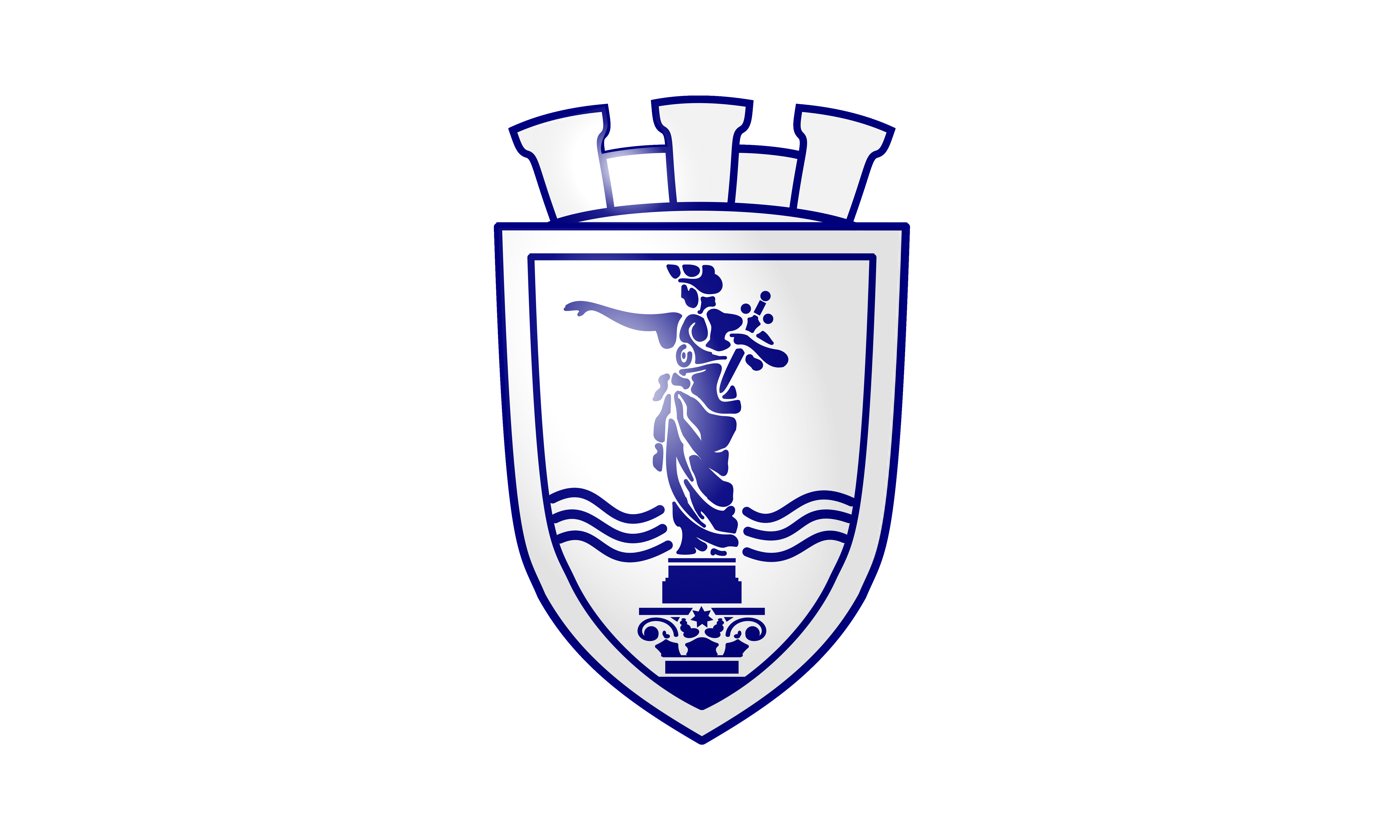
Ruse

Shumen

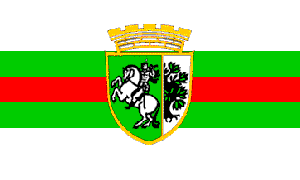
Sliven

Sofia

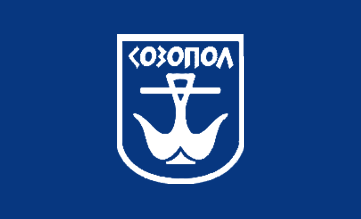
Sozopol

Stara Zagora

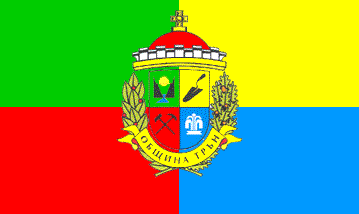
Tran

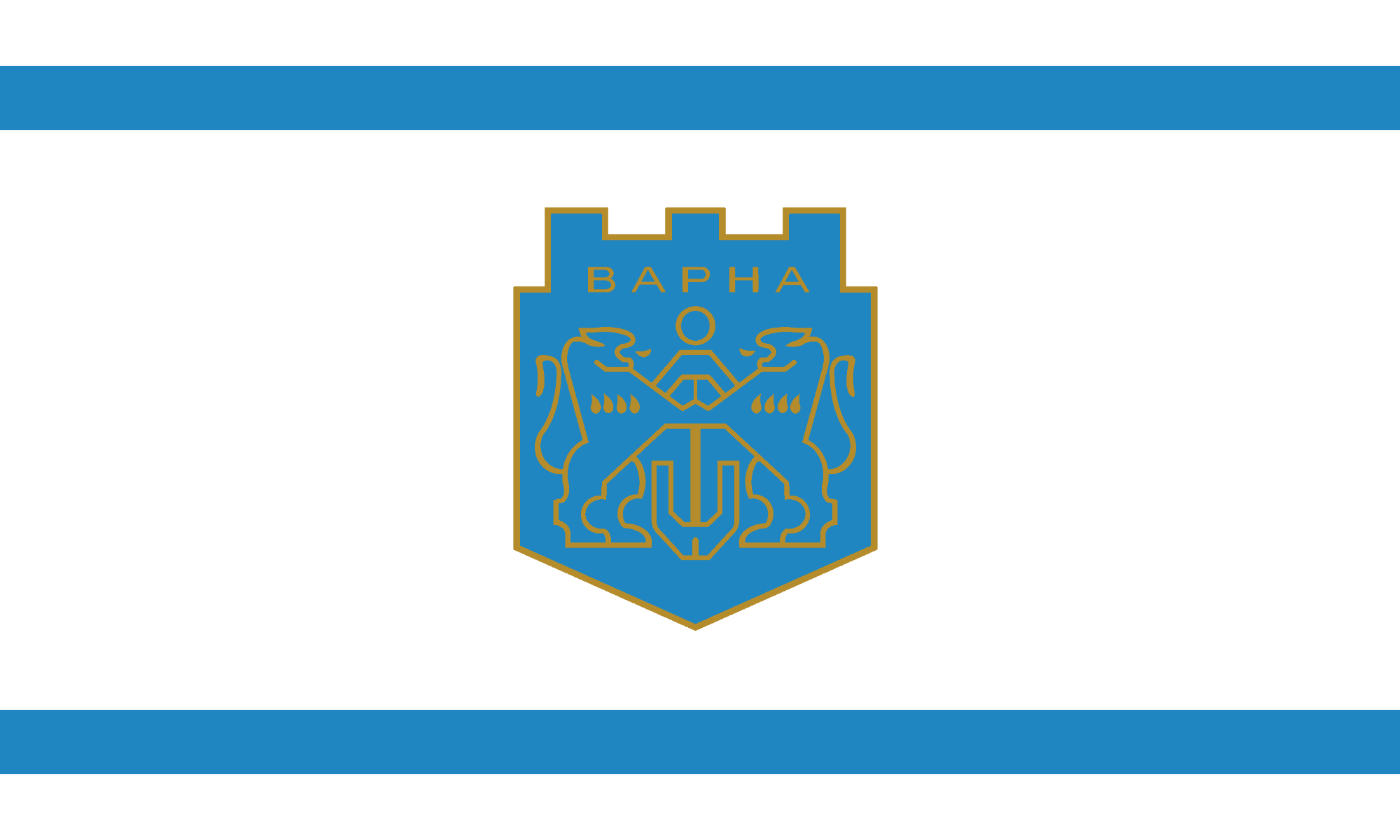
Varna

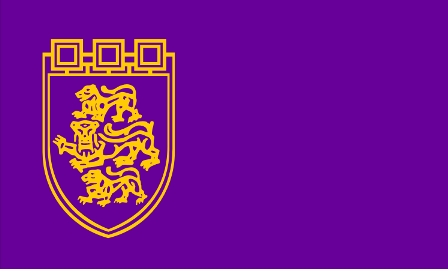
Veliko Tarnovo

Yambol

=== Croatia ===
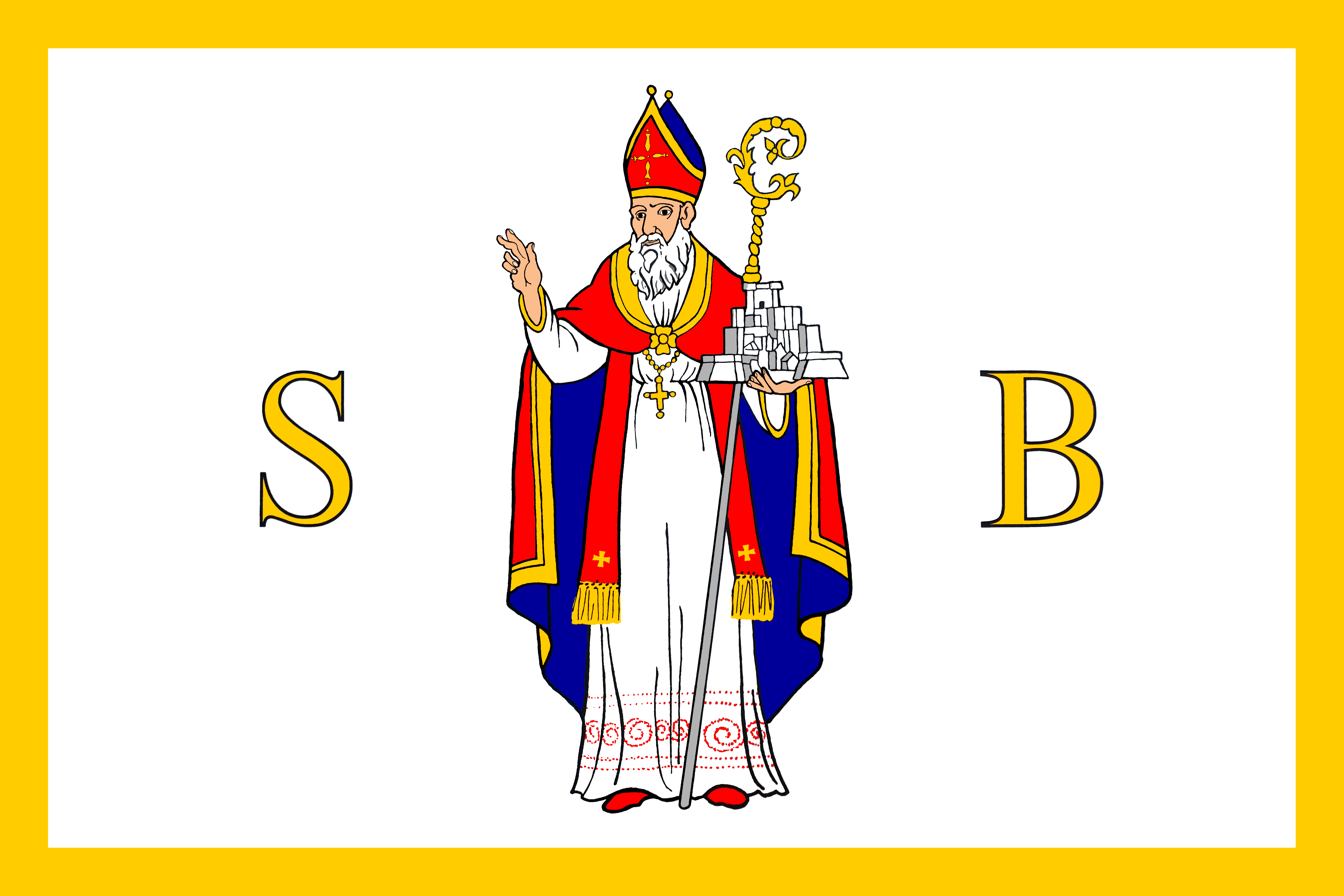
Dubrovnik

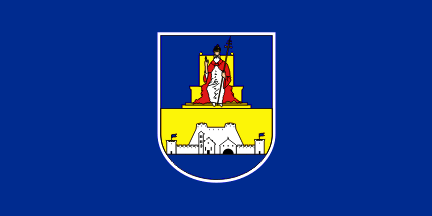
Hvar

Makarska

Pula

Rijeka

Split

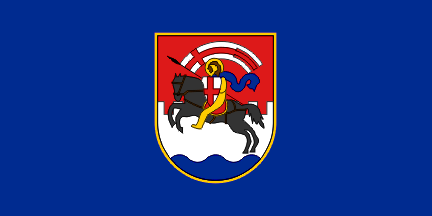
Zadar

Zagreb

=== Greece ===
Aegina (details)

Chania

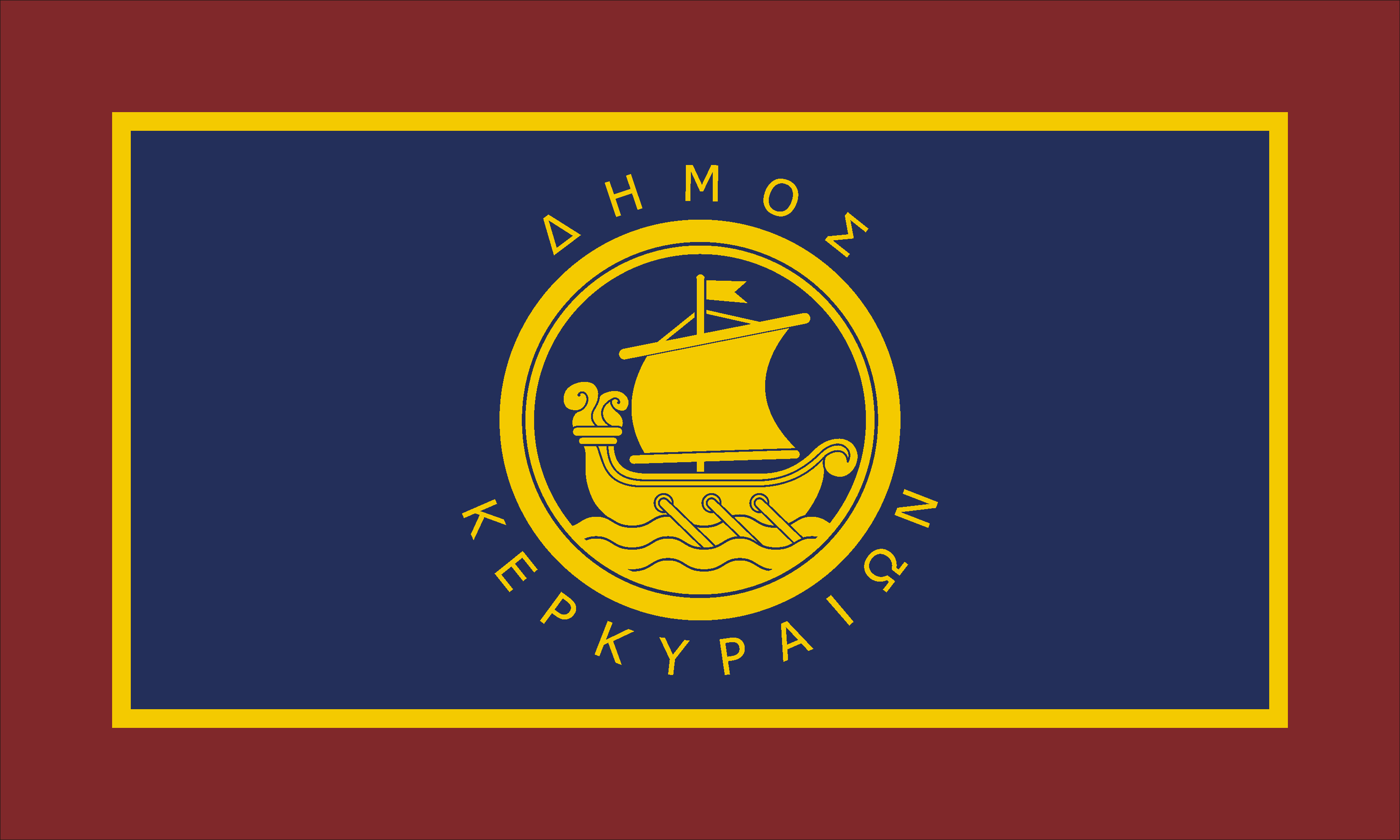
Corfu

Heraklion

Hydra

Kastellorizo

Paxi

Rethymno

Psara

Rhodes

Spetses

Thessaloniki

=== Kosovo ===
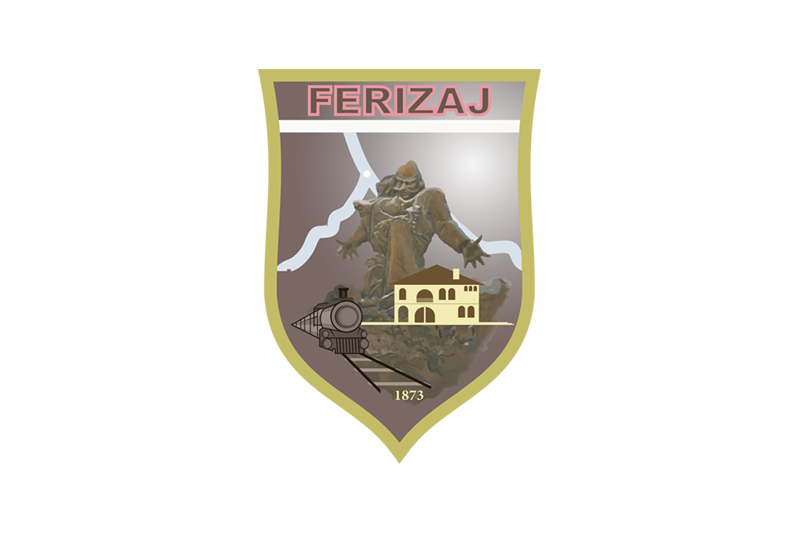
Ferizaj

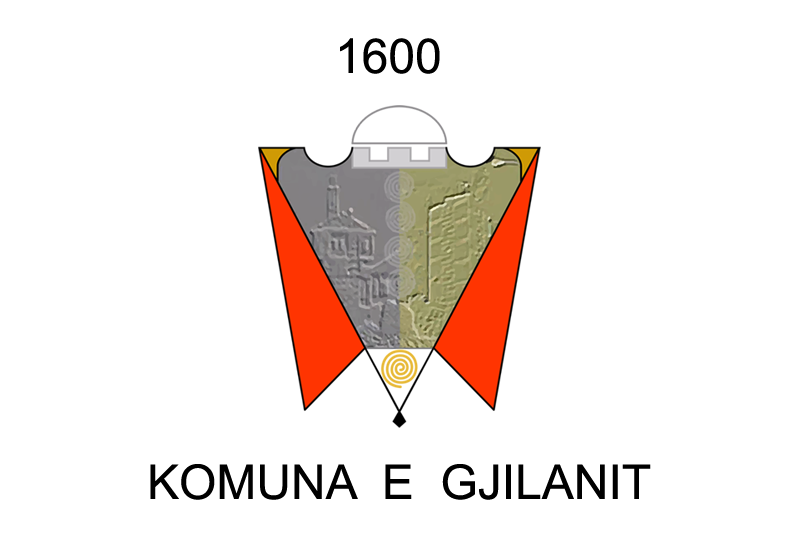
Gjilan

Prishtinë

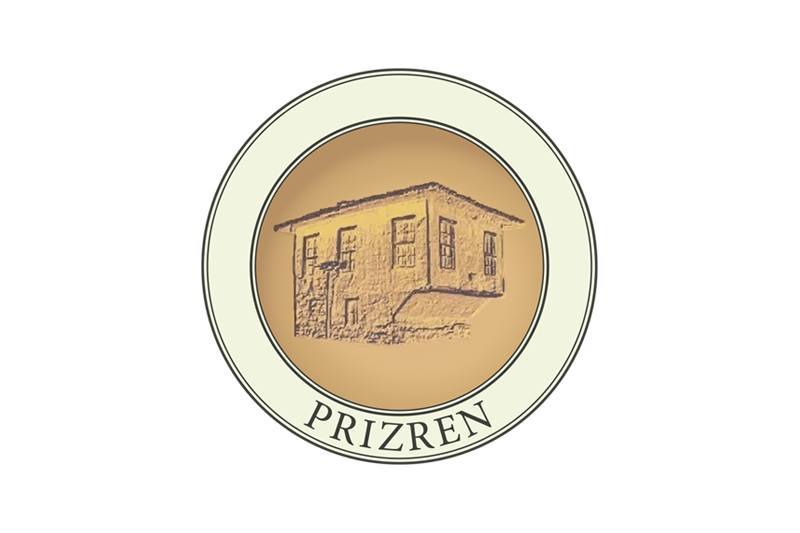
Prizren

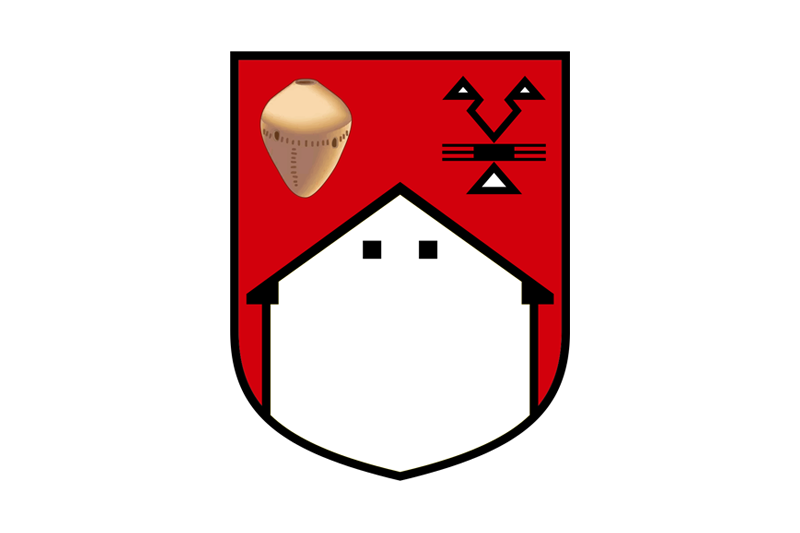
Skenderaj

Shtime

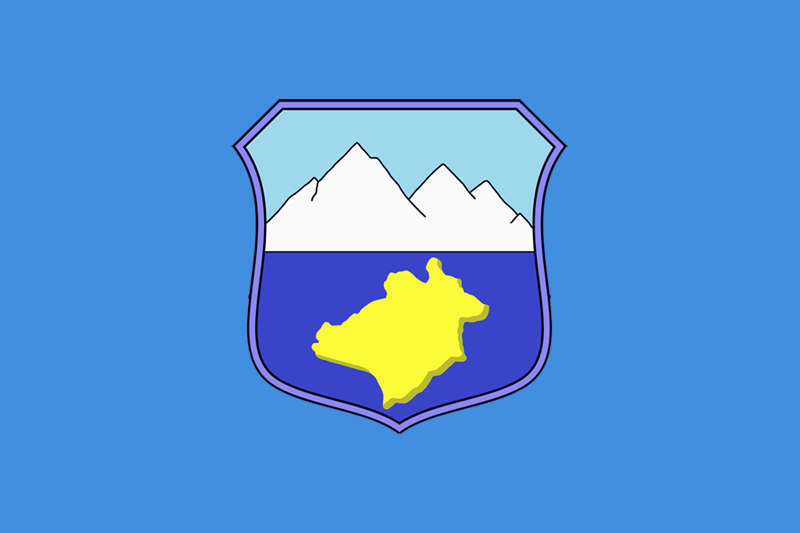
Shtërpcë

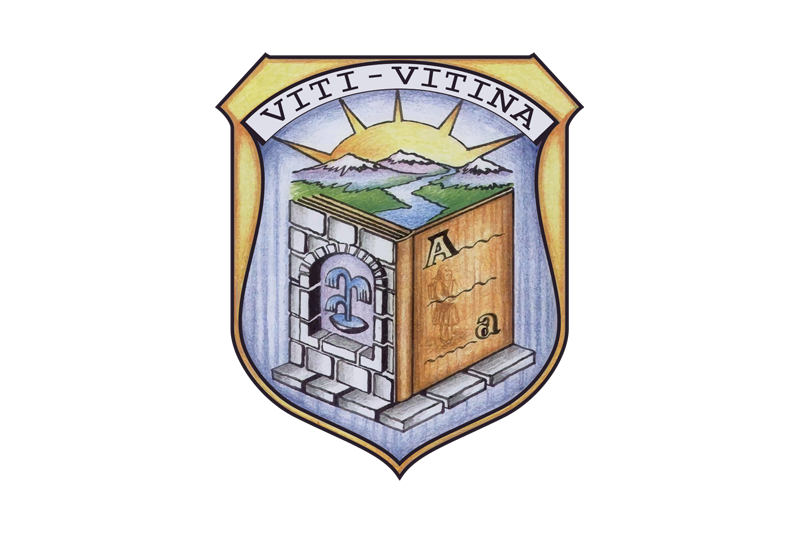
Vitina

Vushtrri

=== Malta ===
Birgu

Cospicua

Mdina

Qormi

Rabat

Siġġiewi

Valletta

Żabbar

Żebbuġ, Malta Island

Żebbuġ, Gozo

Żejtun

Żurrieq

=== Historical ===
Birżebbuġa (1993–2000)

Floriana (1993–2006)

Kalkara (1993–2009)

Lija (1993–2000)

Mellieħa (1993–2000)

Mġarr (1993–2000)

Mosta (1993–2007)

Nadur (1993–2000)

Naxxar (1993–2000)

Paola (1994–1996)

Qrendi (1993–2000)

Siġġiewi (1993–2001)

Xgħajra (1993–2000)

Żebbuġ, Malta Island (1993–2000)

=== Montenegro ===
Bar

Budva

Cetinje

Herceg Novi

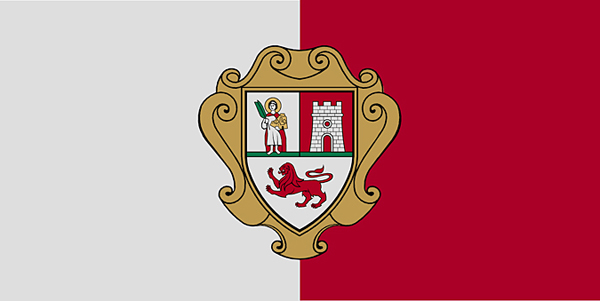
Kotor

Pljevlja

Podgorica (details)

Tuzi

Ulcinj

=== North Macedonia ===
==== Cities ====
Bitola

Debar

Gostivar

Kumanovo

Prilep

Radoviš

Skopje (details)

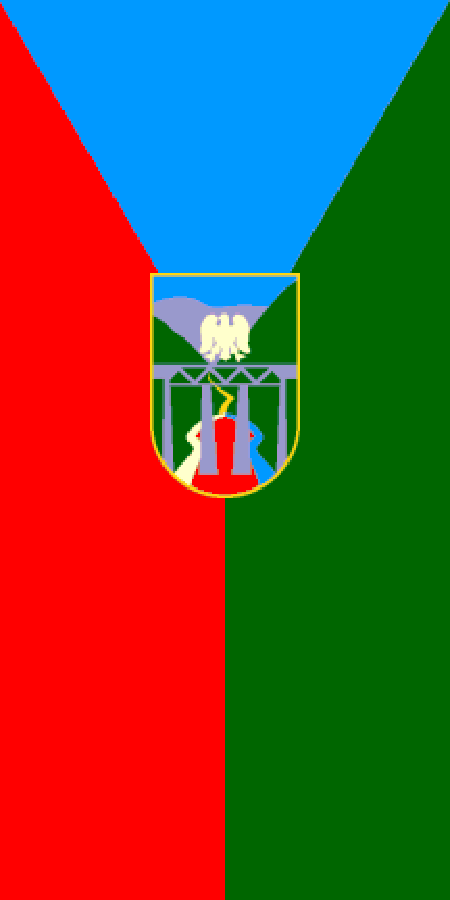
Srbinovo

Štip

Strumica

Tetovo

=== Romania ===
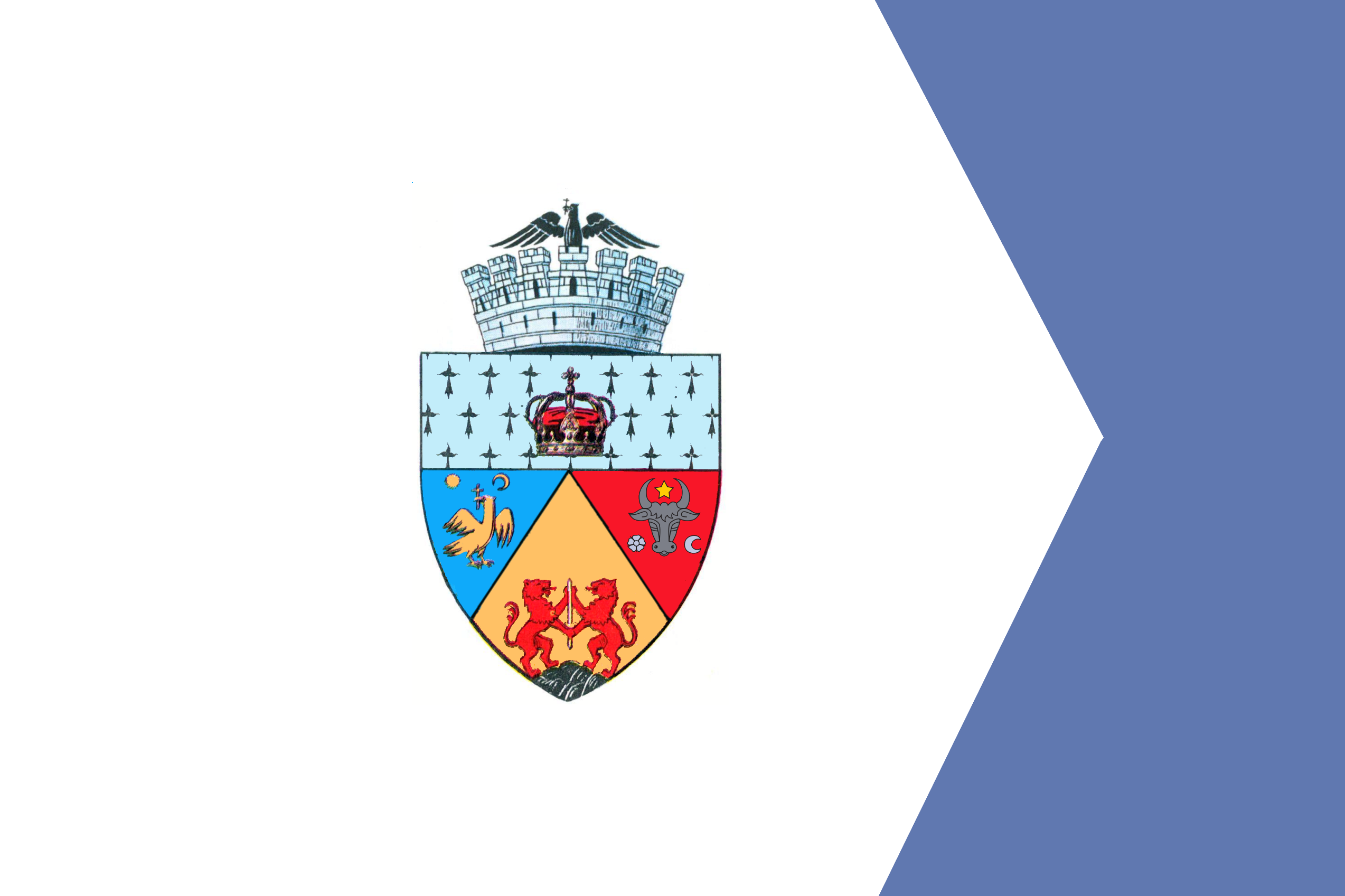
Alba Iulia

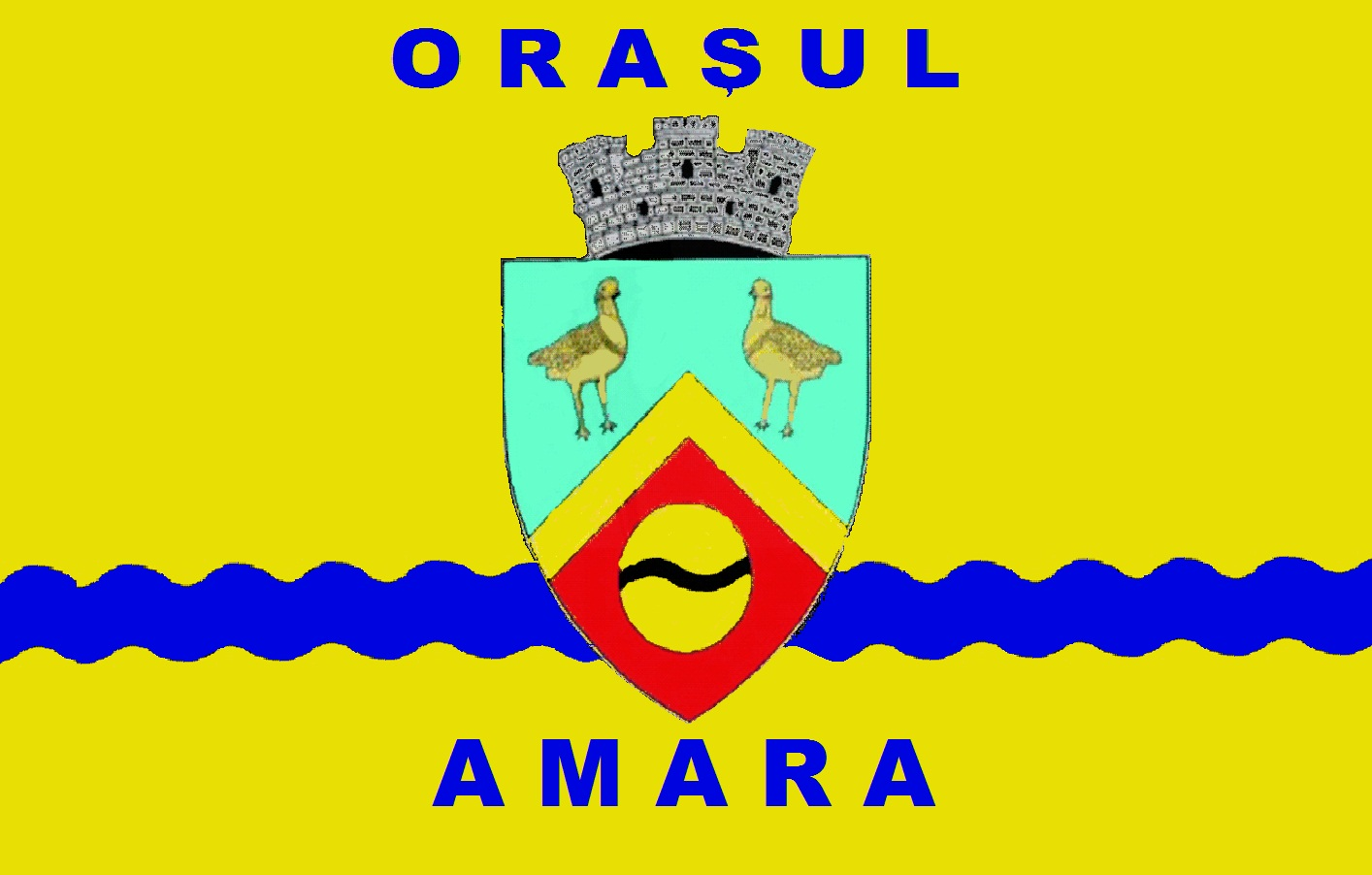
Amara

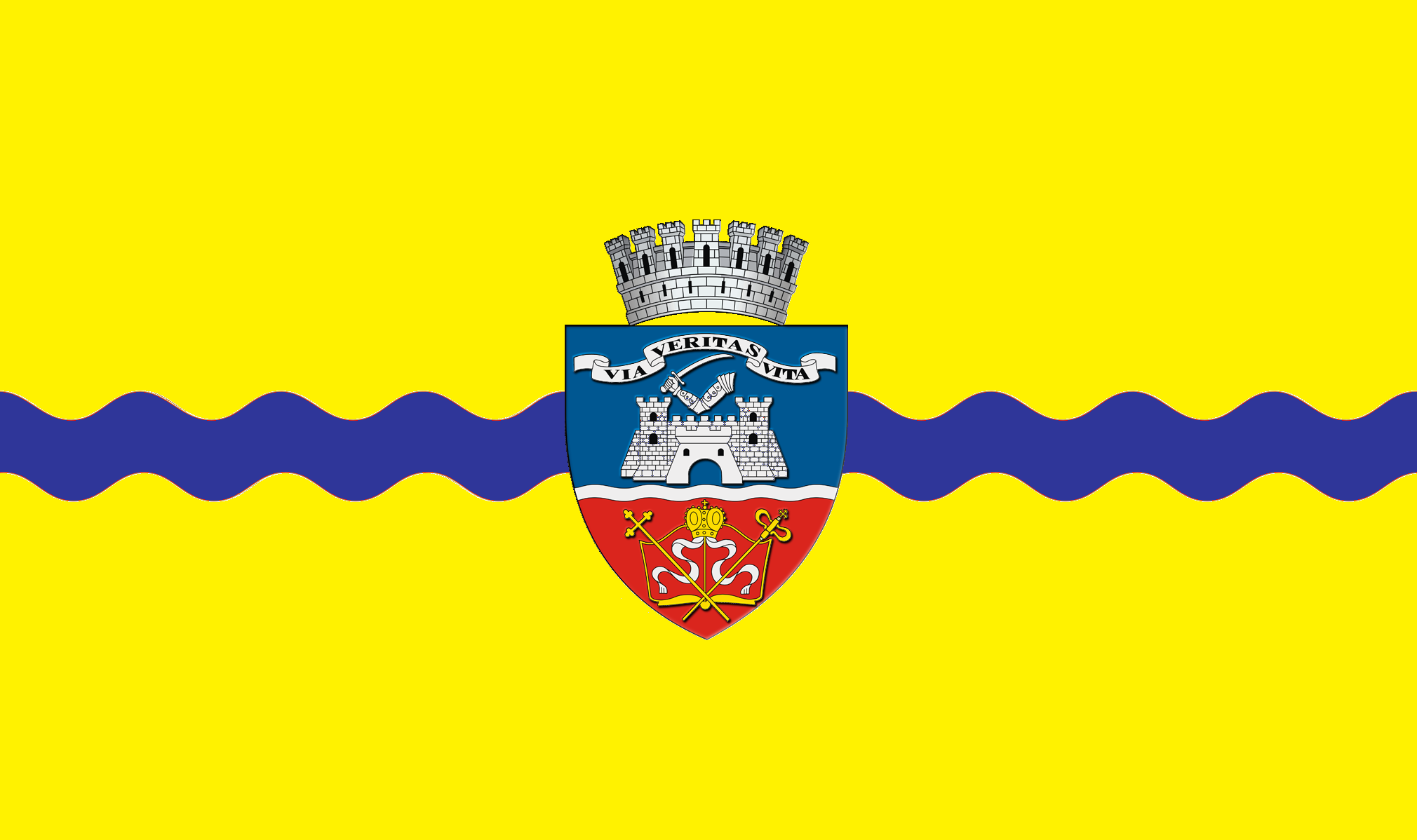
Arad

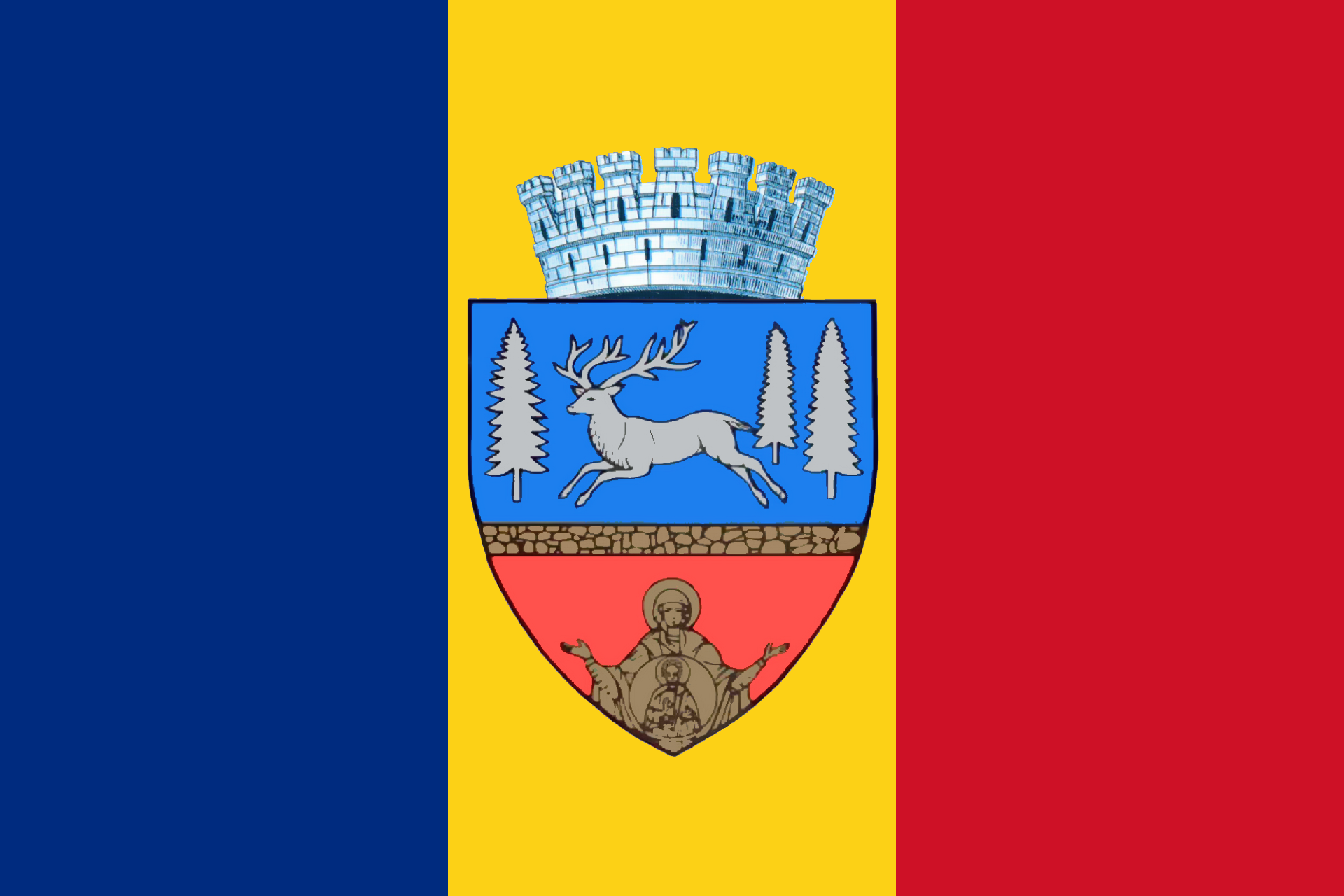
Bacău

Brașov

Bucharest

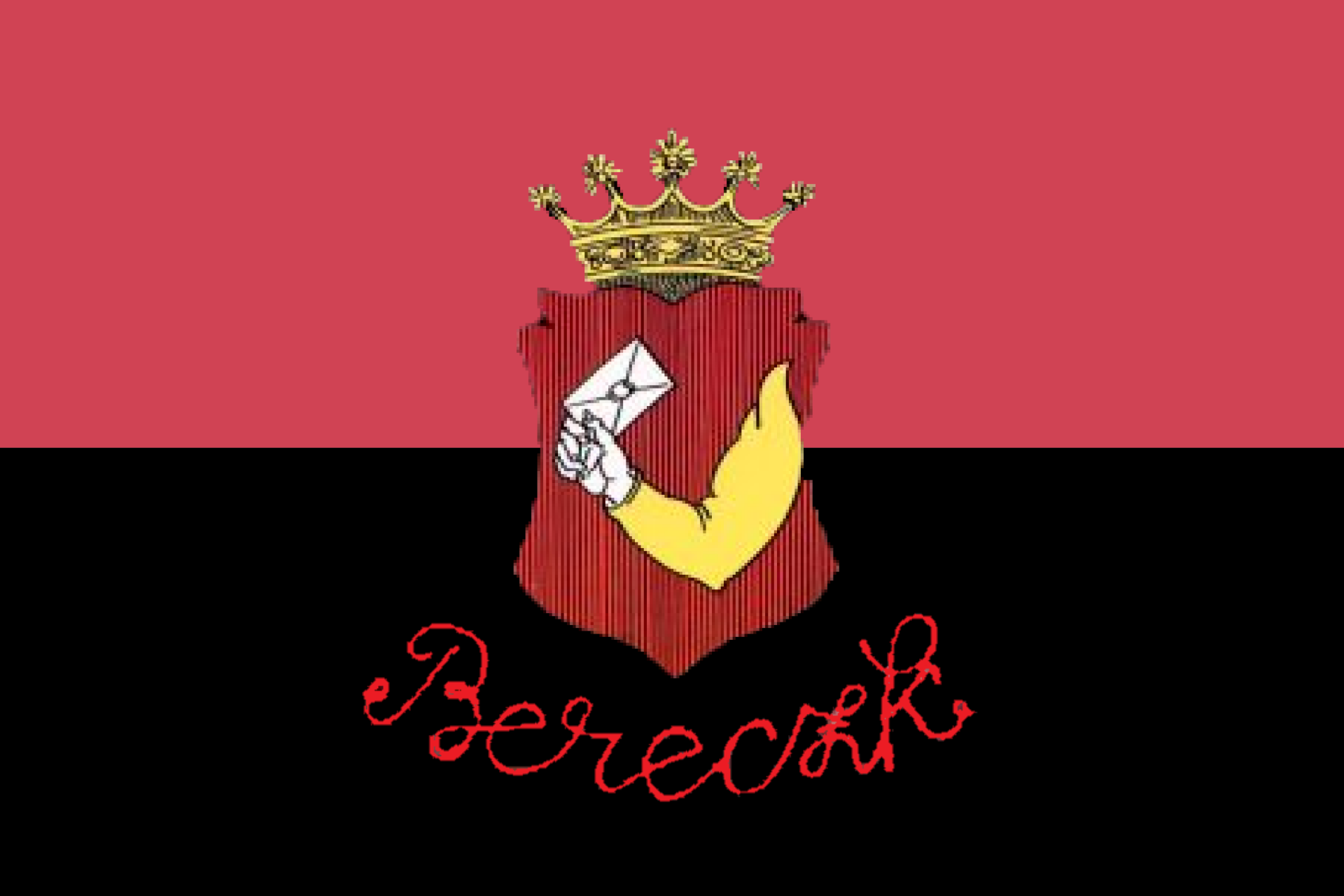
Brețcu

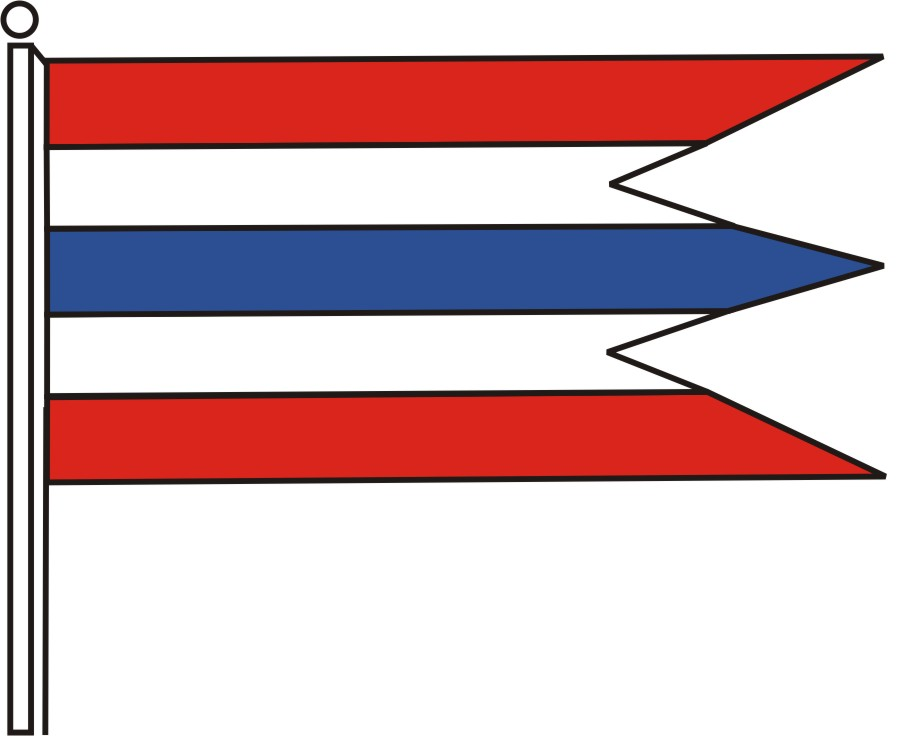
Bucovăț

Carei

Constanța

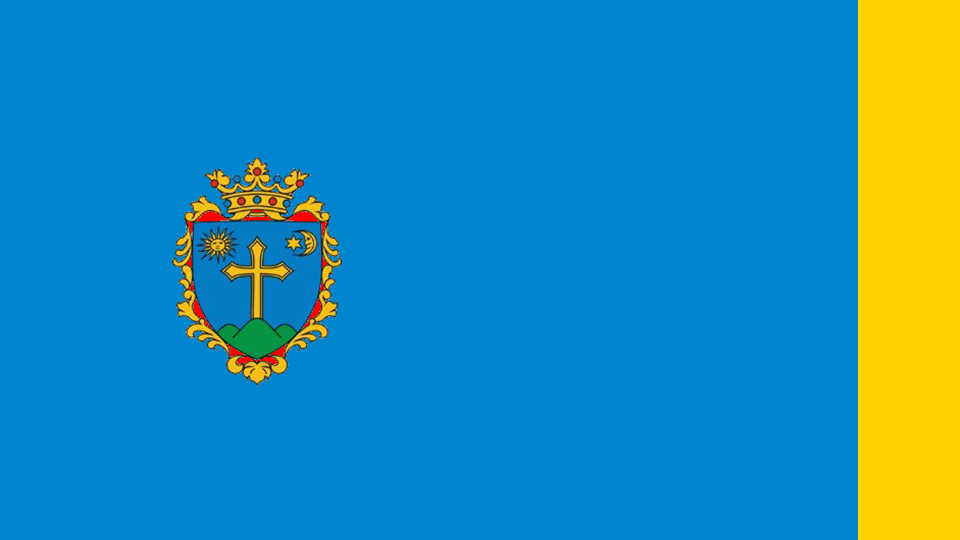
Cristuru Secuiesc

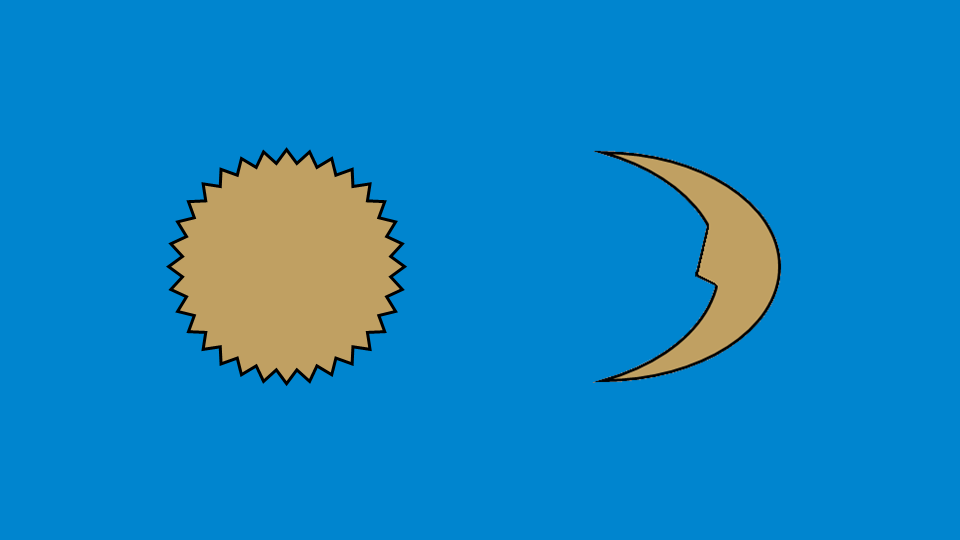
Gheorgheni

Huedin

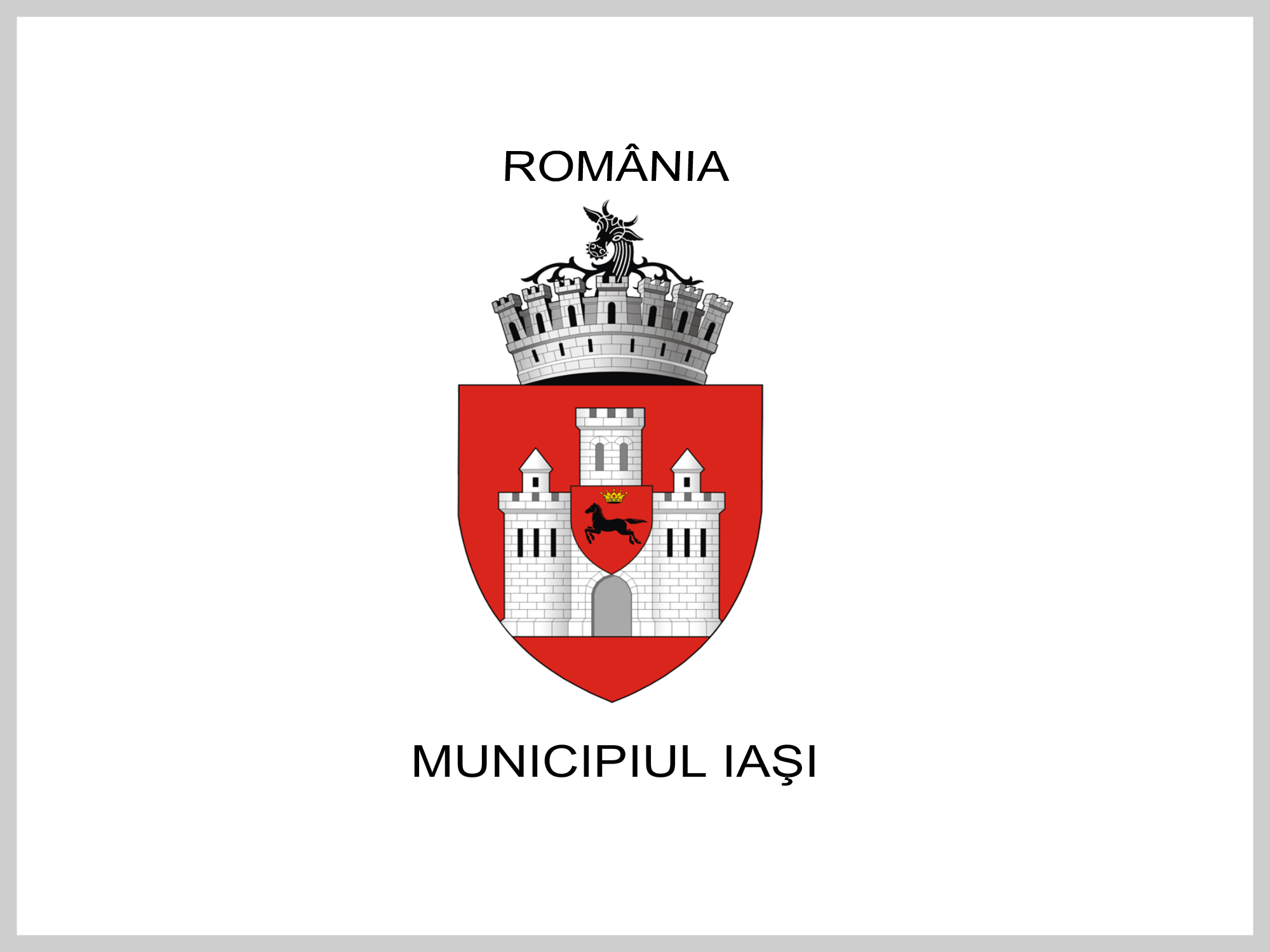
Iași

Miercurea Ciuc

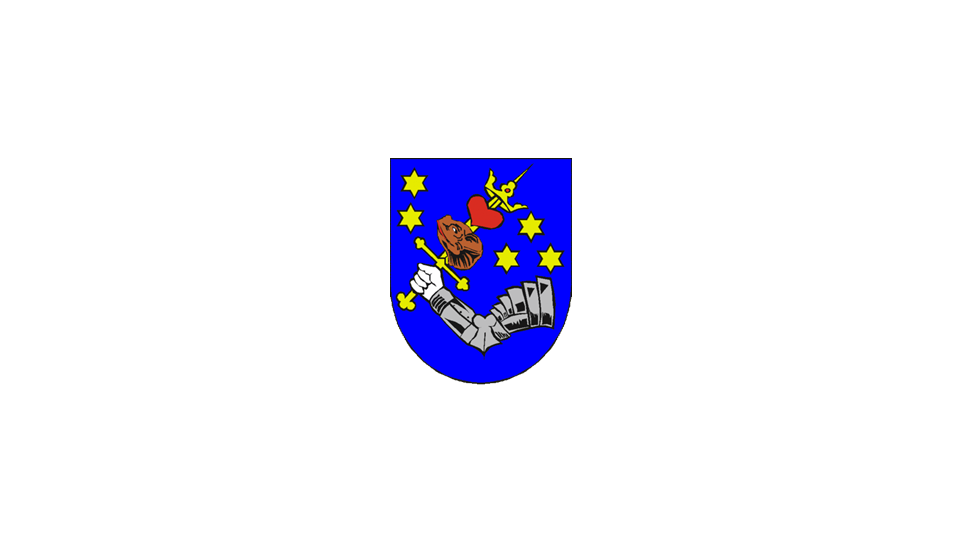
Odorheiu Secuiesc

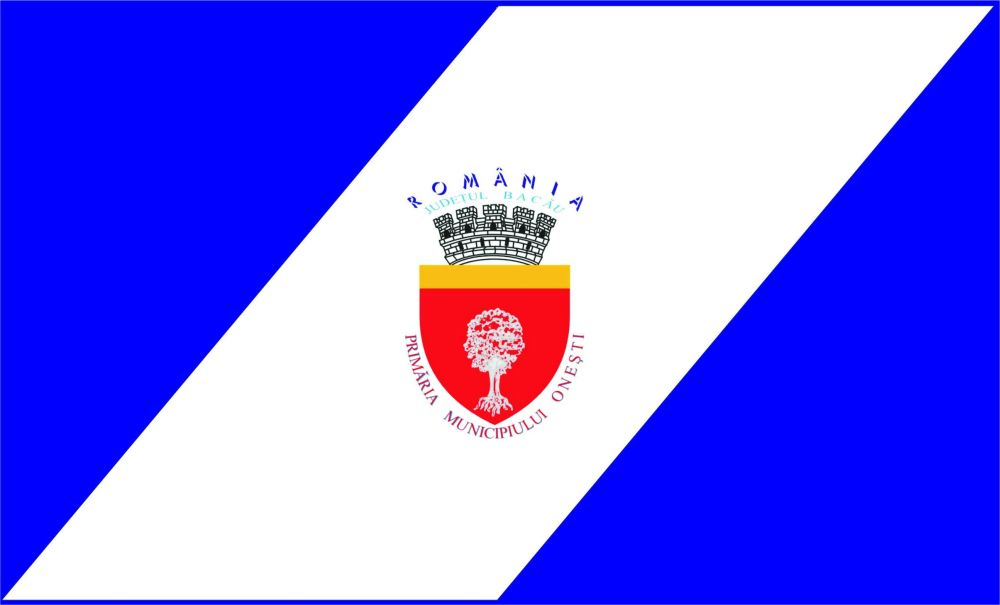
Onești

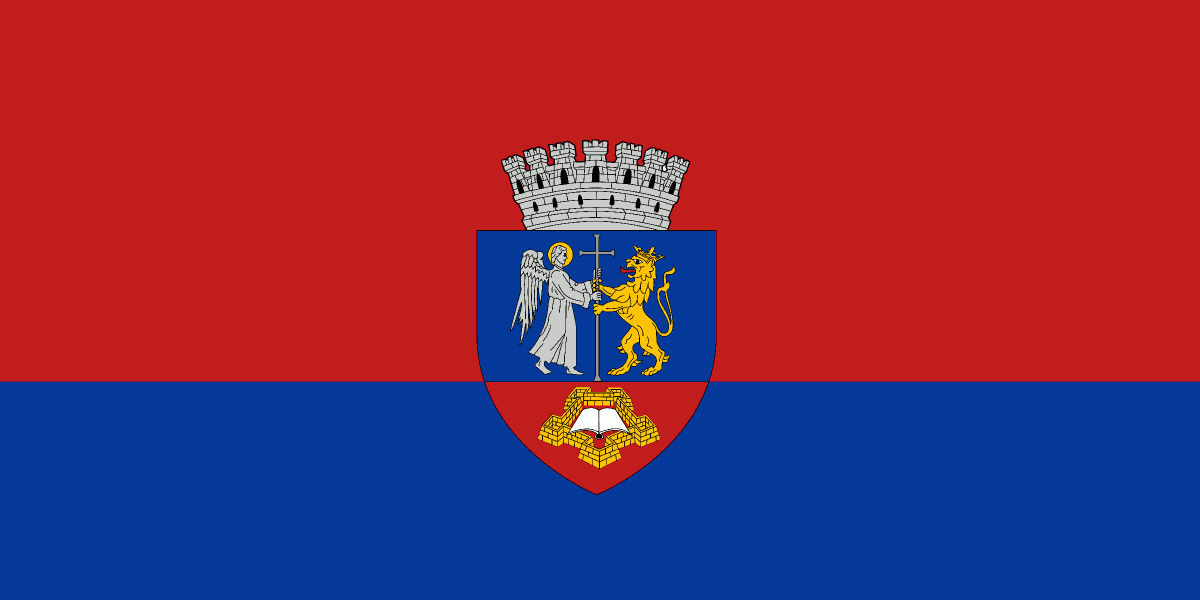
Oradea

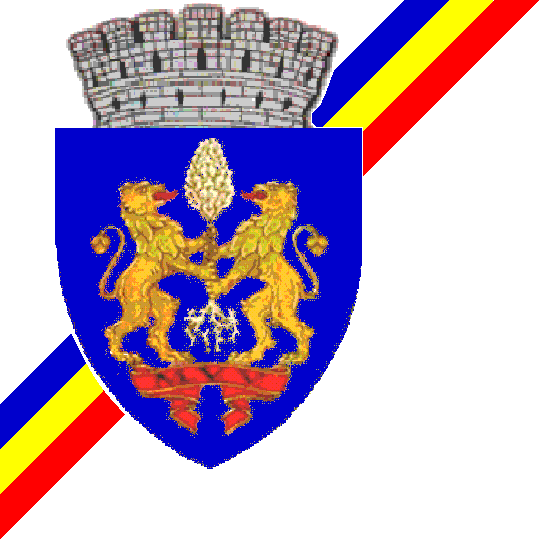
Ploiești

Roman

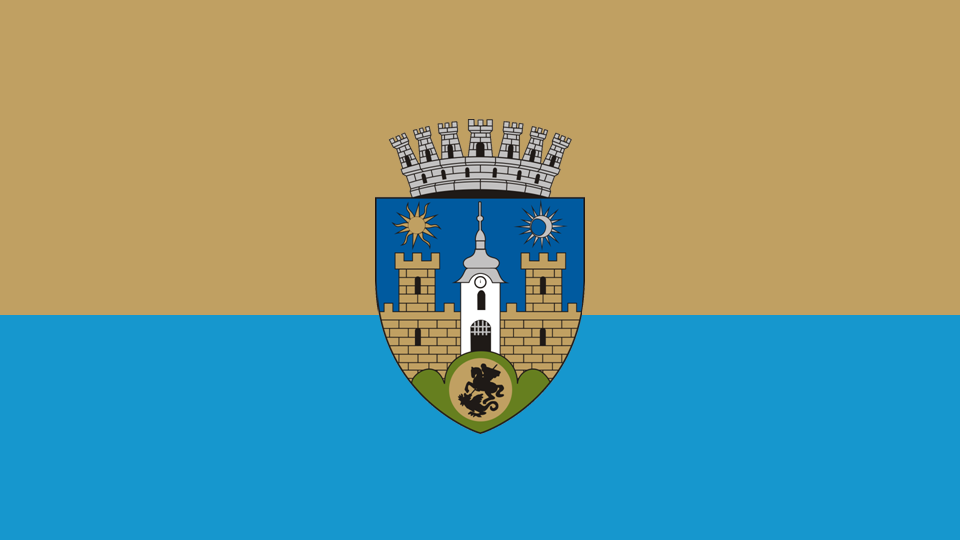
Sfantu Gheorghe

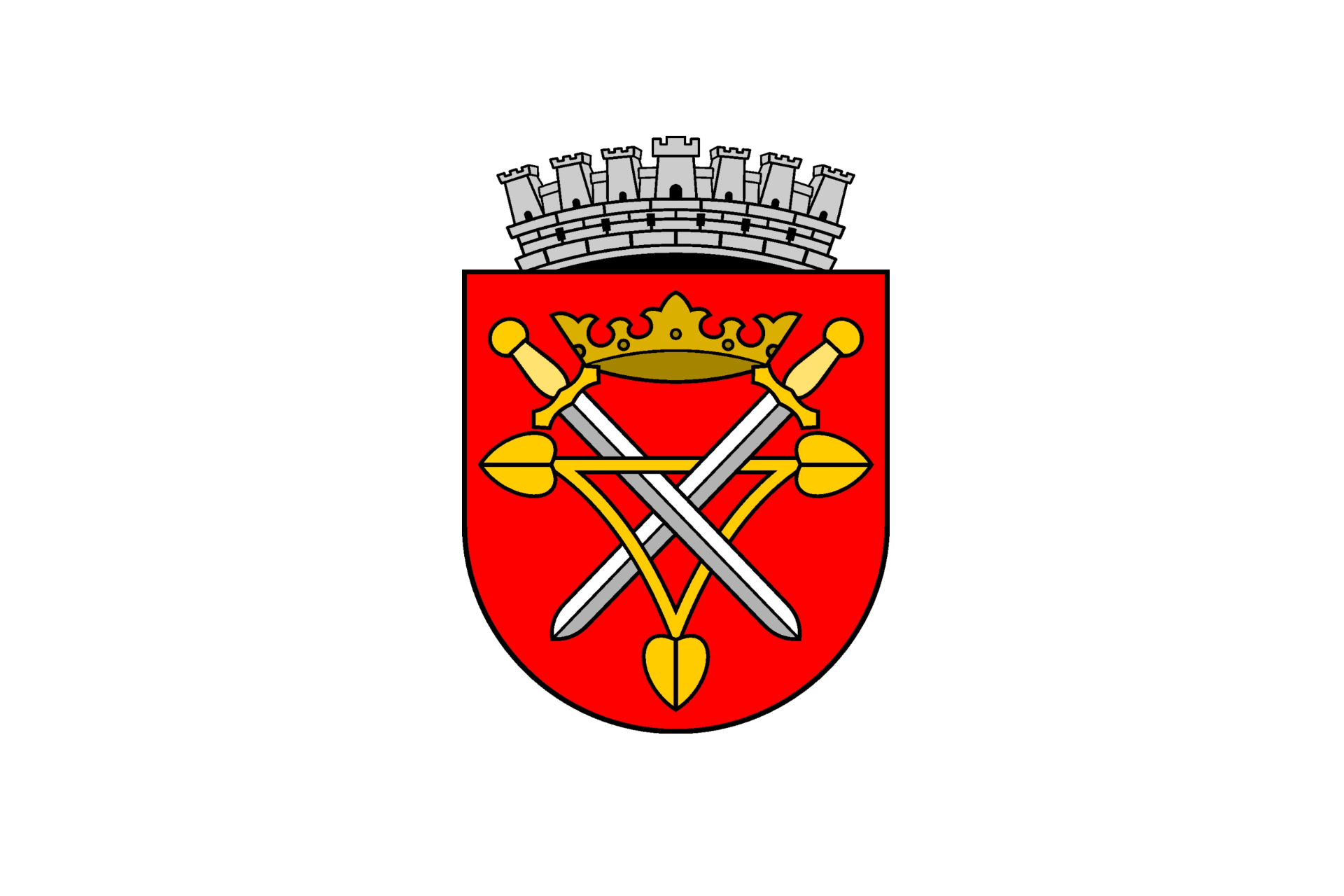
Sibiu

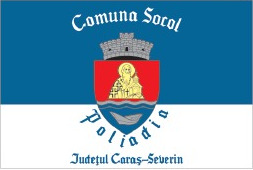
Socol

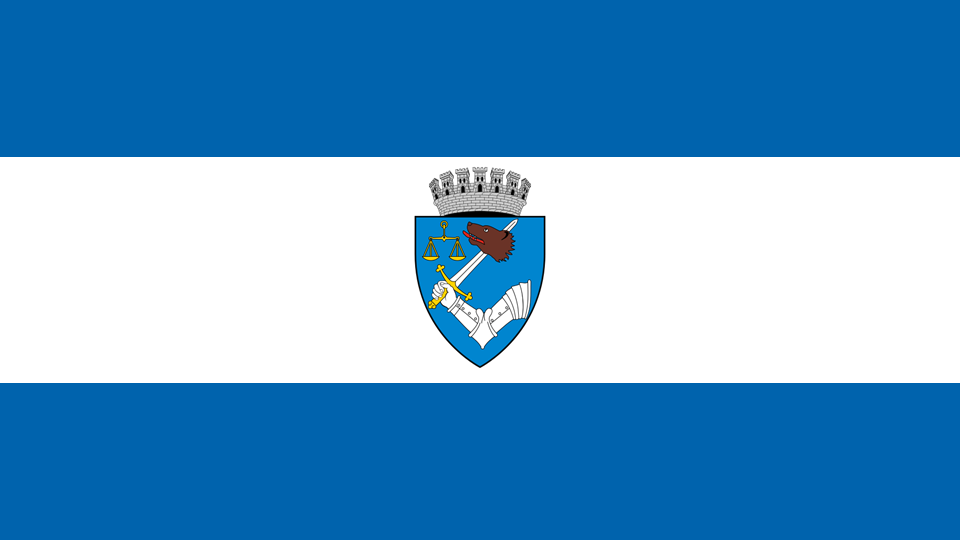
Targu Mureș

Târgu Secuiesc

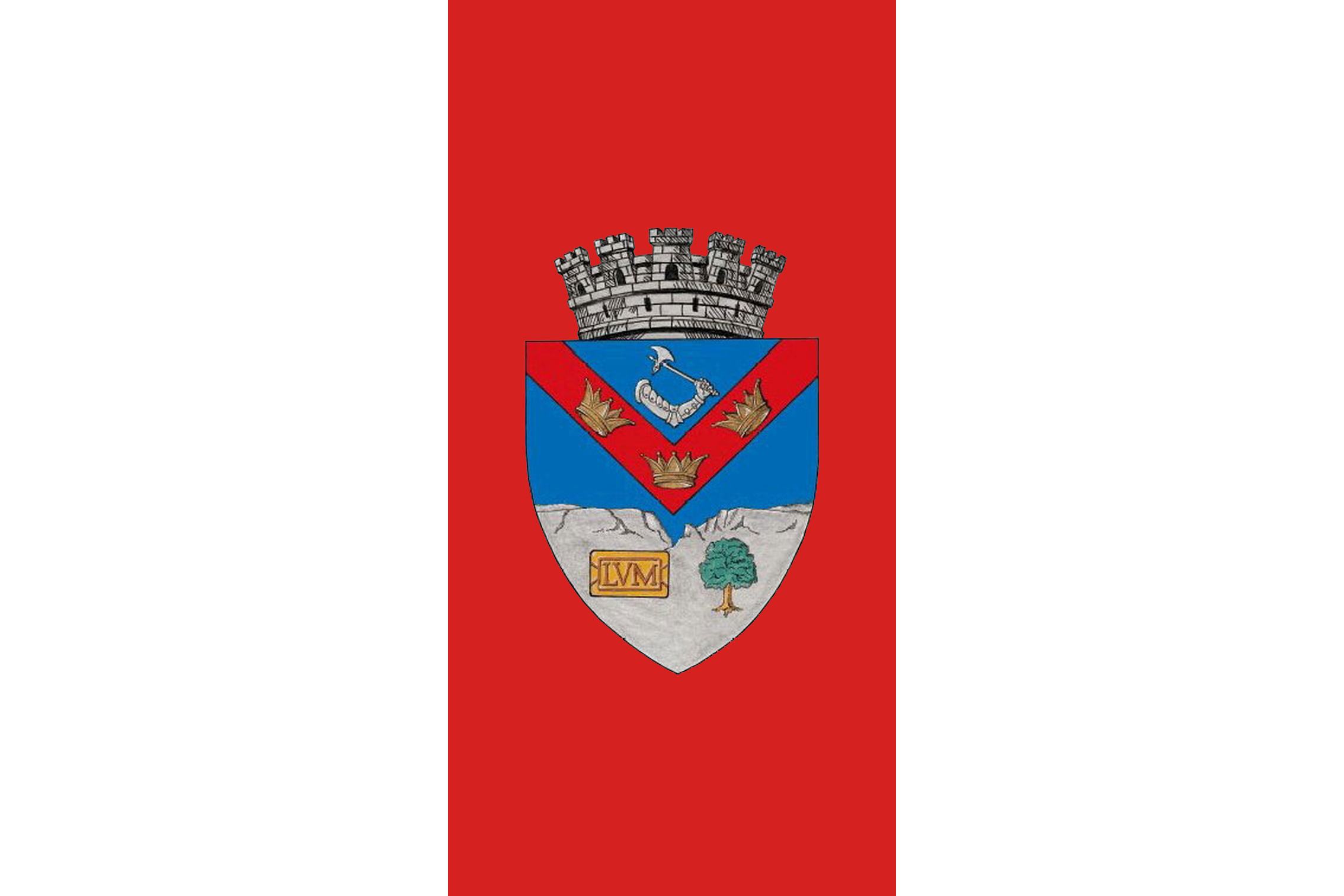
Turda

=== San Marino ===
Acquaviva

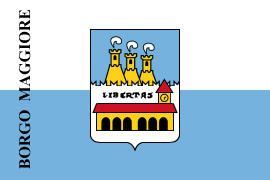
Borgo Maggiore

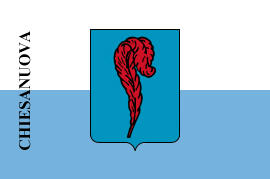
Chiesanuova

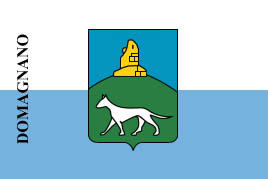
Domagnano

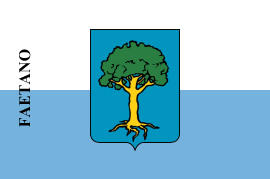
Faetano

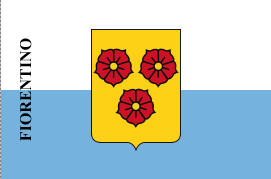
Fiorentino

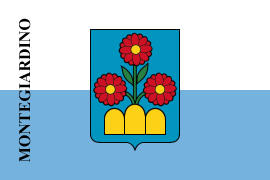
Montegiardino

San Marino

Serravalle

=== Serbia ===
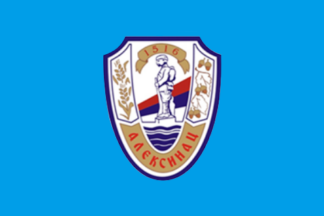
Aleksinac

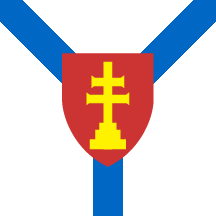
Arilje

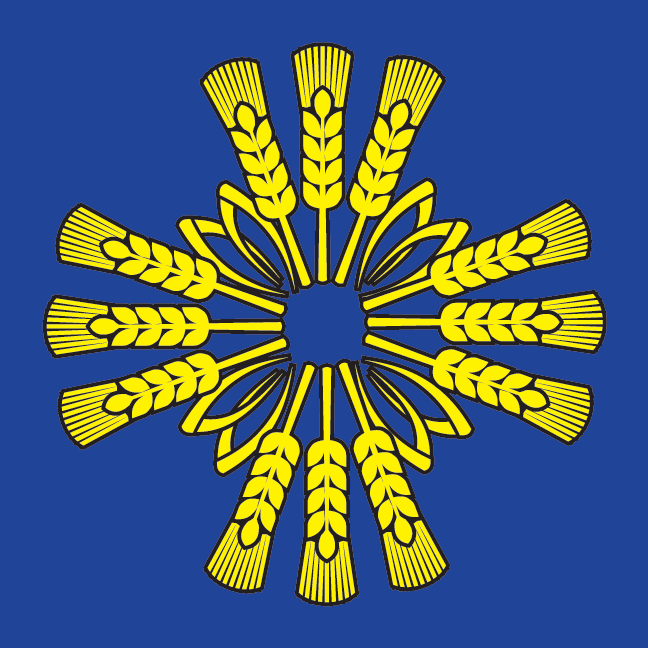
Barajevo

Belgrade (details)

Bor

Bosilegrad

Bujanovac

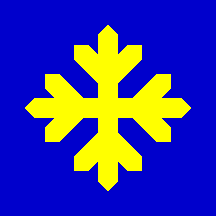
Čajetina

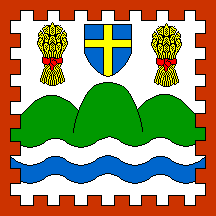
Čukarica

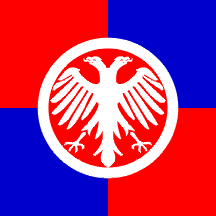
Despotovac

Dimitrovgrad

Golubac

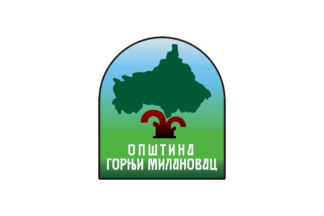
Gornji Milanovac

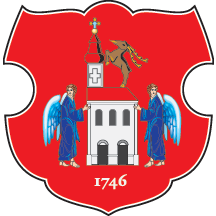
Inđija

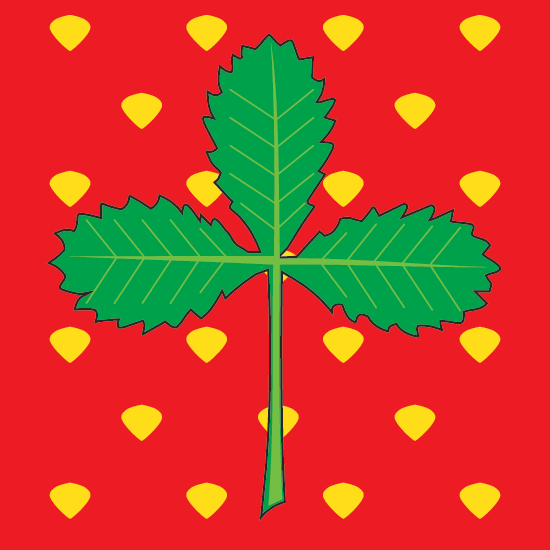
Jagodina

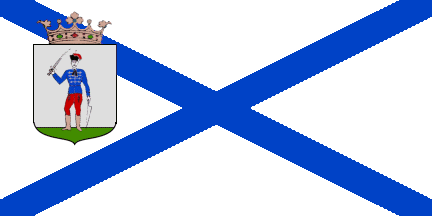
Kanjiža

Kikinda

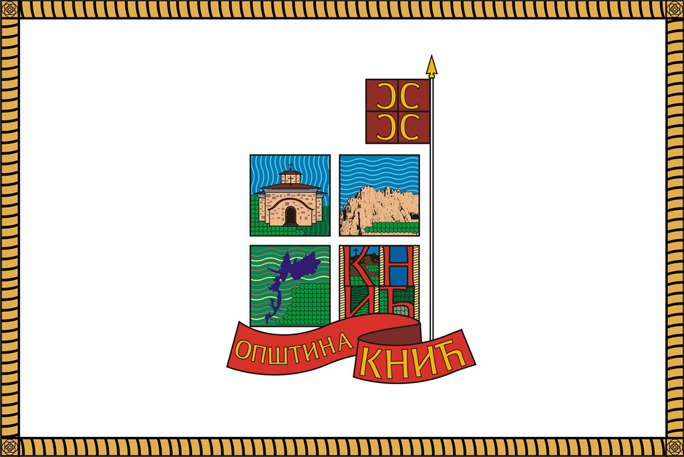
Knić

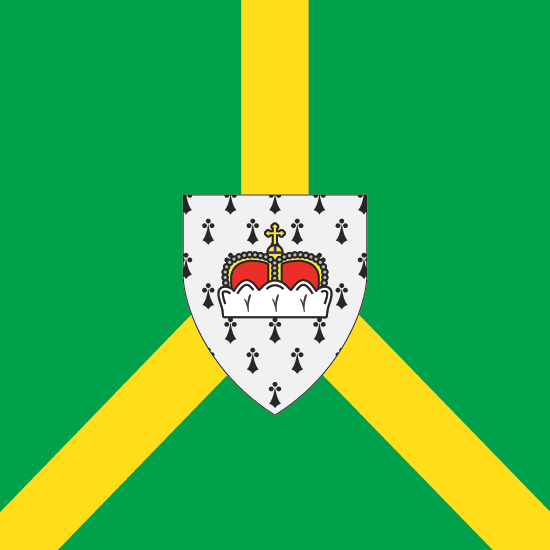
Knjaževac

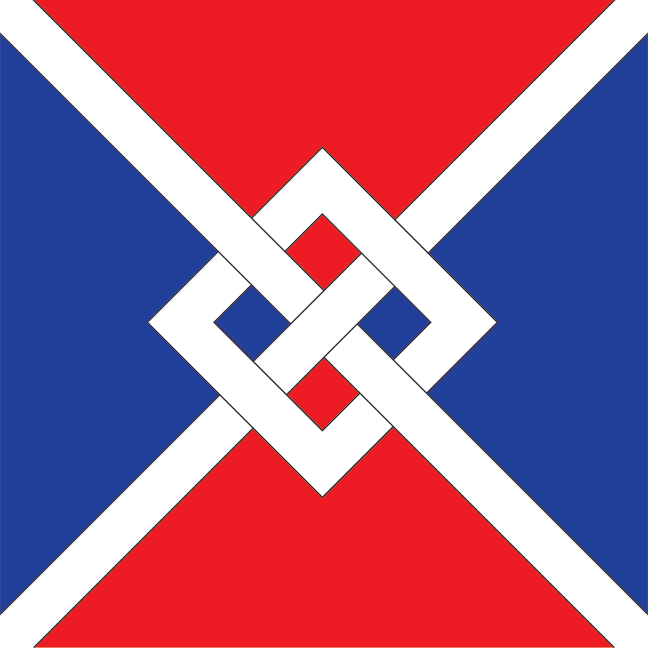
Koceljeva

Kragujevac

Kraljevo

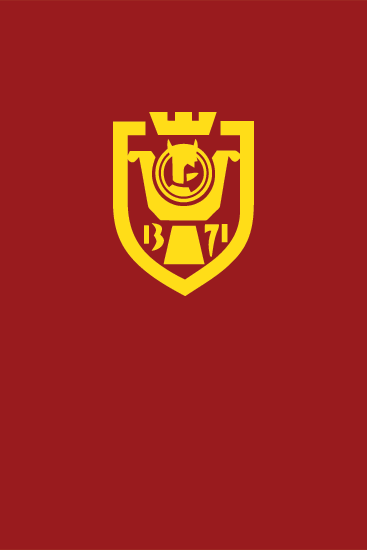
Kruševac

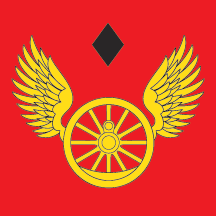
Lajkovac

Lazarevac

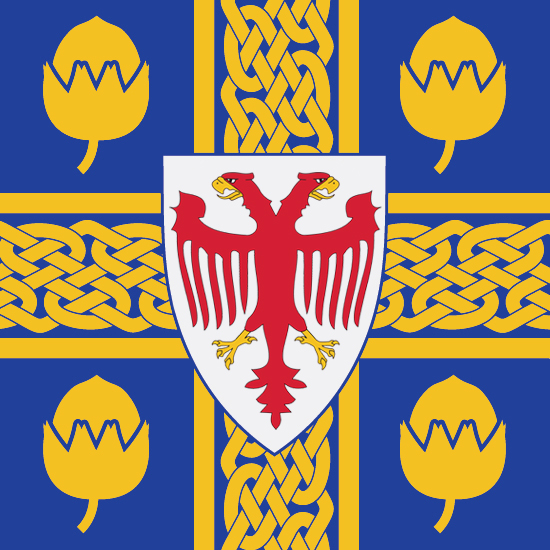
Leskovac

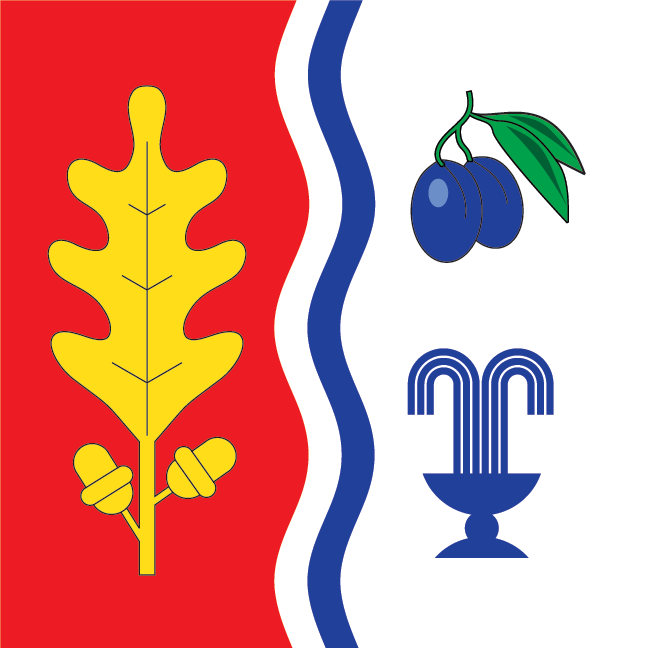
Ljig

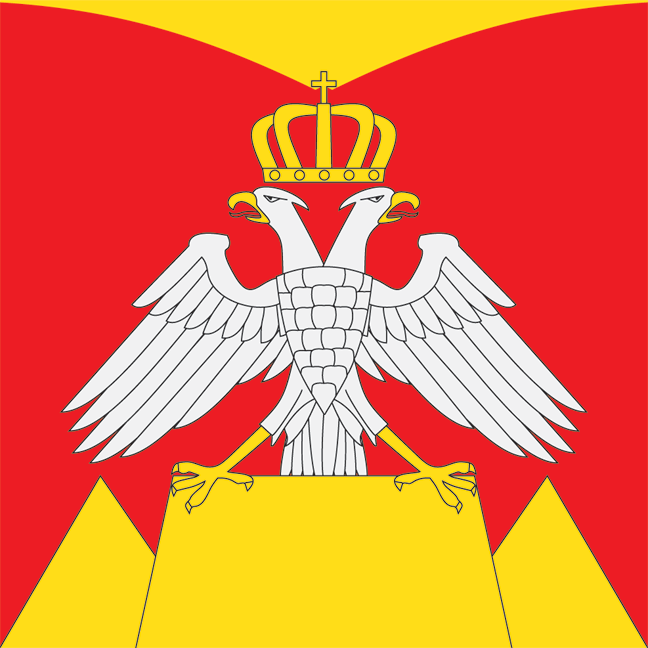
Mionica

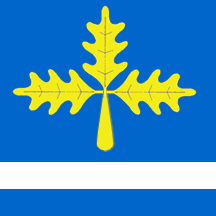
Mladenovac

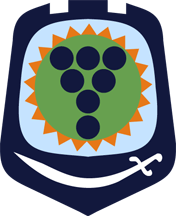
Negotin

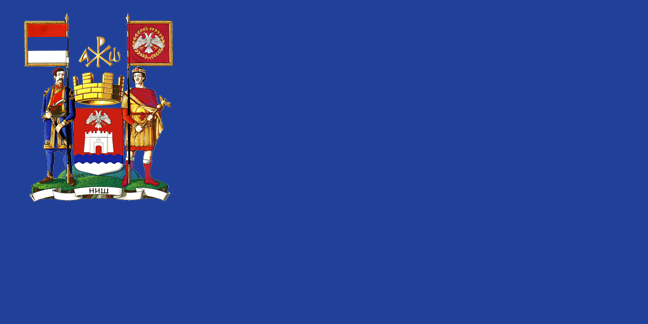
Niš (details)

Novi Beograd

Novi Sad

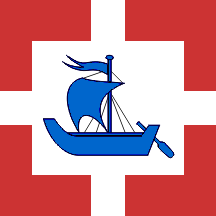
Obrenovac

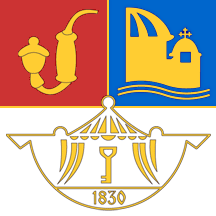
Palilula

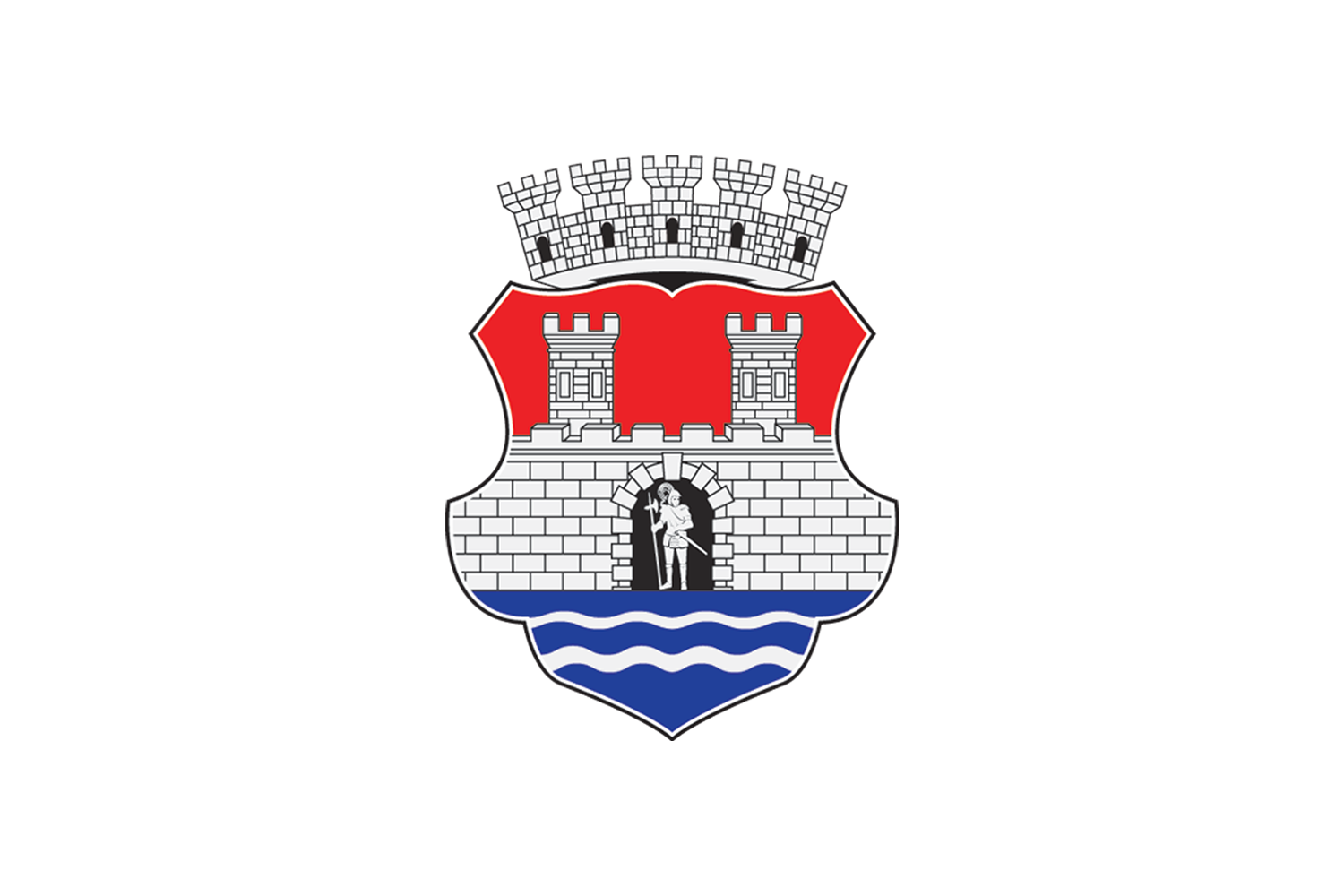
Pančevo

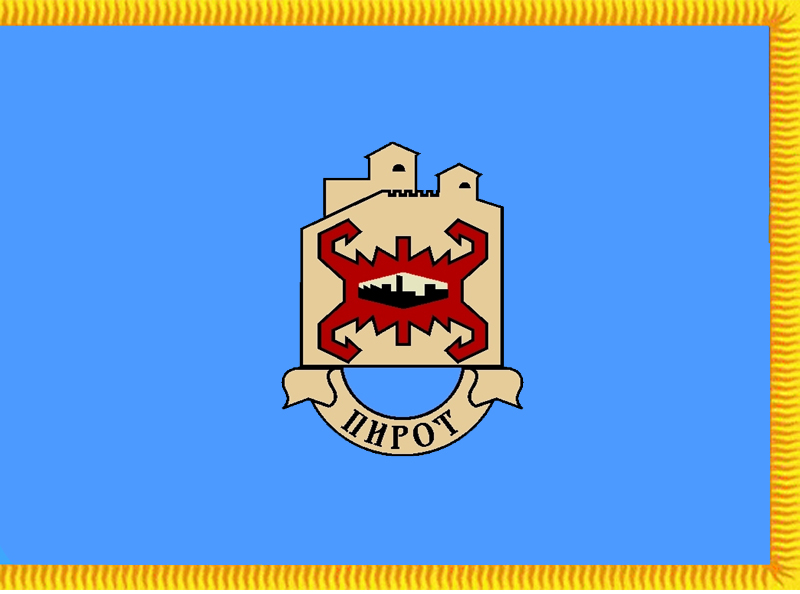
Pirot

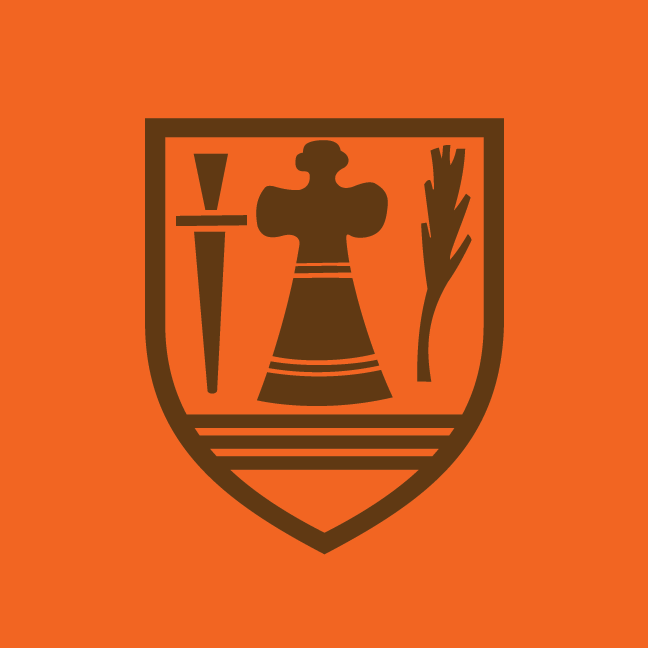
Požarevac

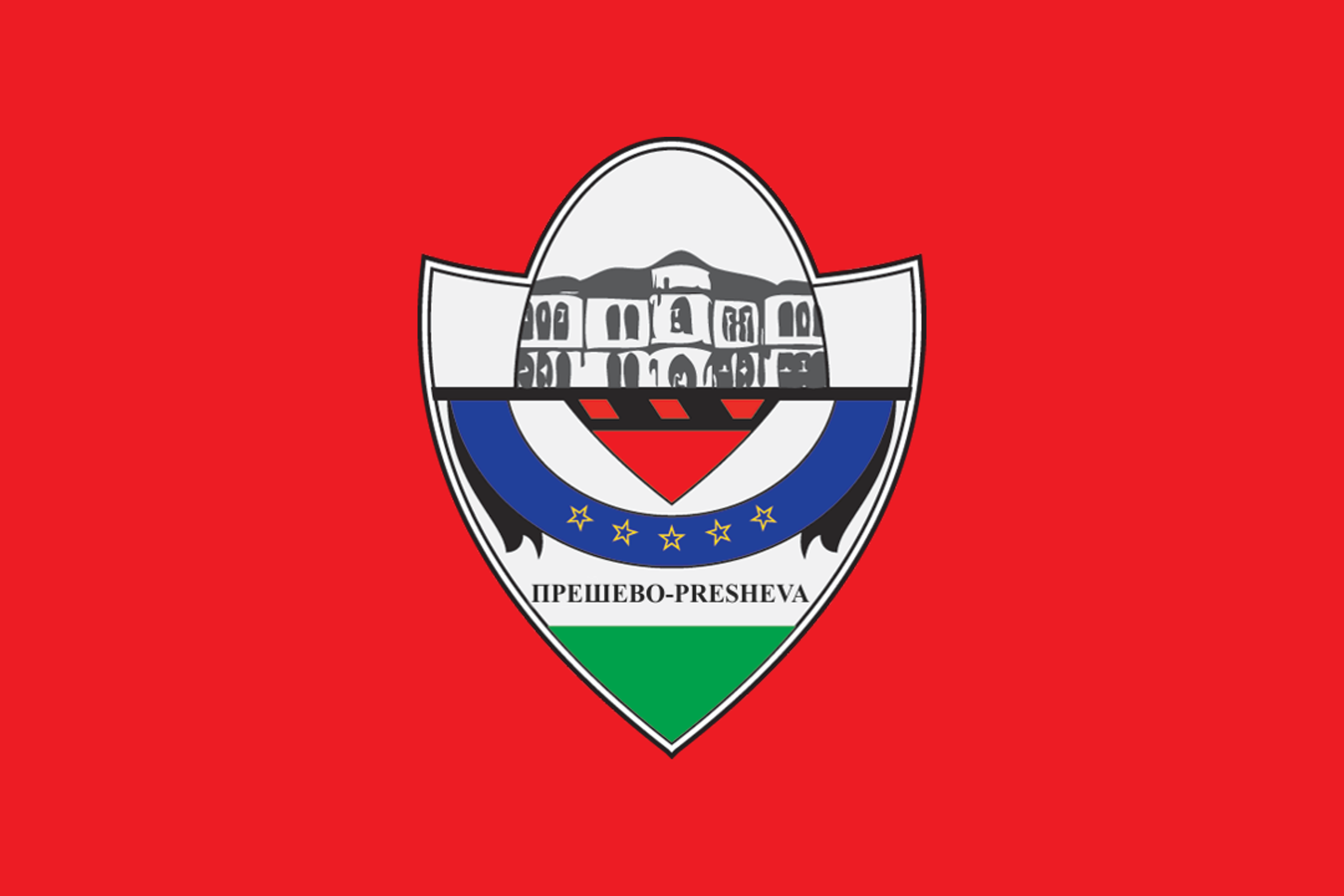
Preševo

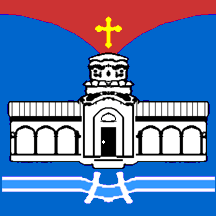
Rakovica

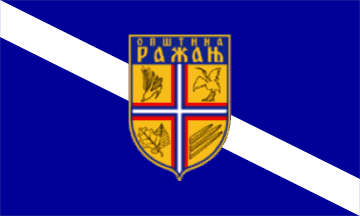
Ražanj

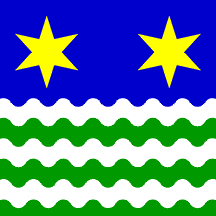
Ruma

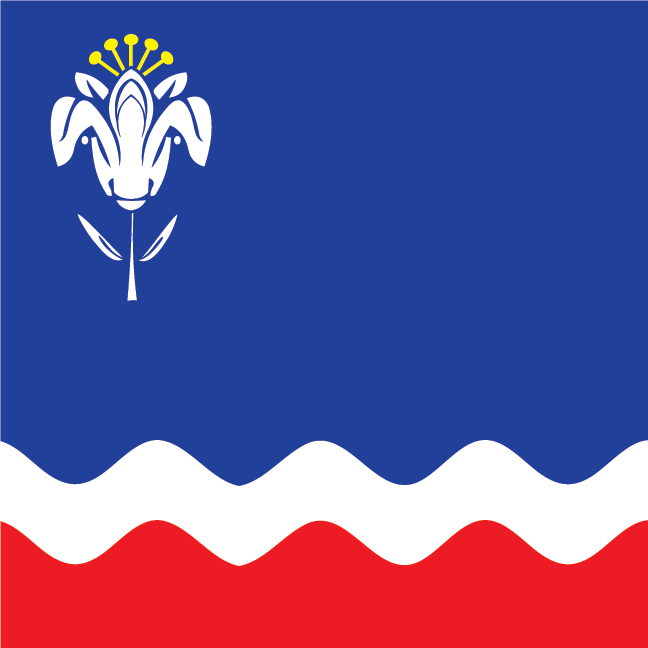
Šabac

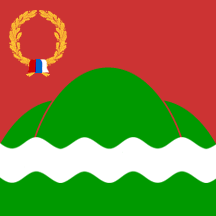
Savski Venac

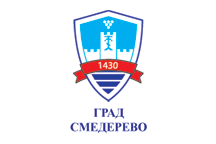
Smederevo

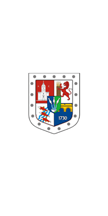
Smederevska Palanka

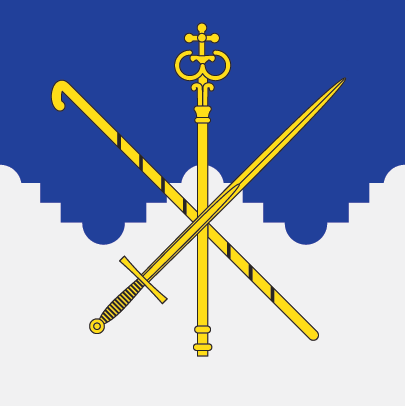
Stara Pazova

Stari Grad

Subotica

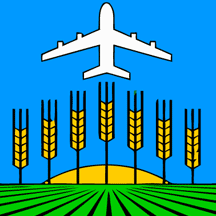
Surčin

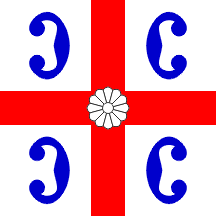
Surdulica

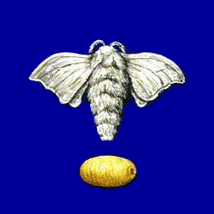
Svilajnac

Topola

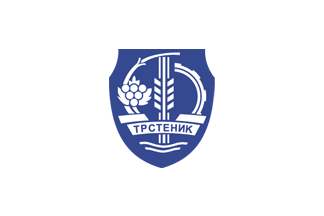
Trstenik

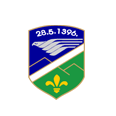
Tutin

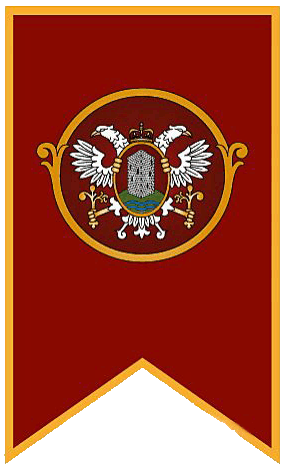
Valjevo

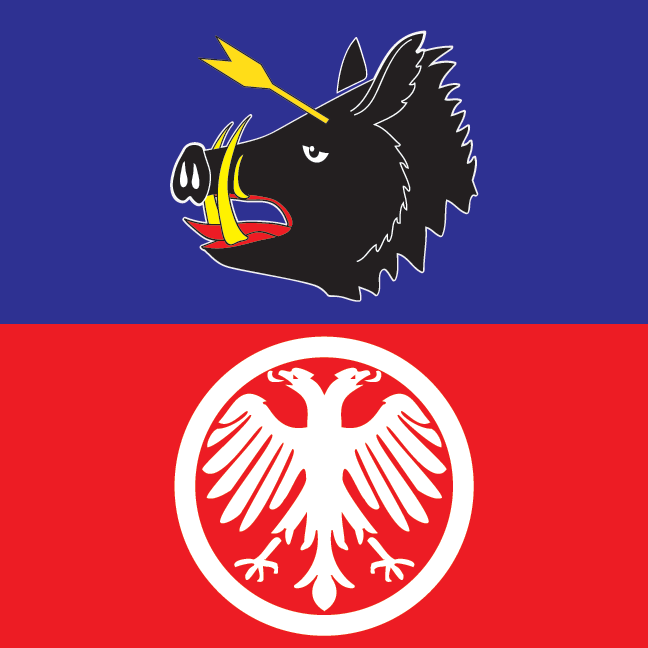
Velika Plana

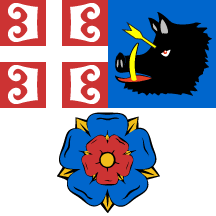
Voždovac

Vračar

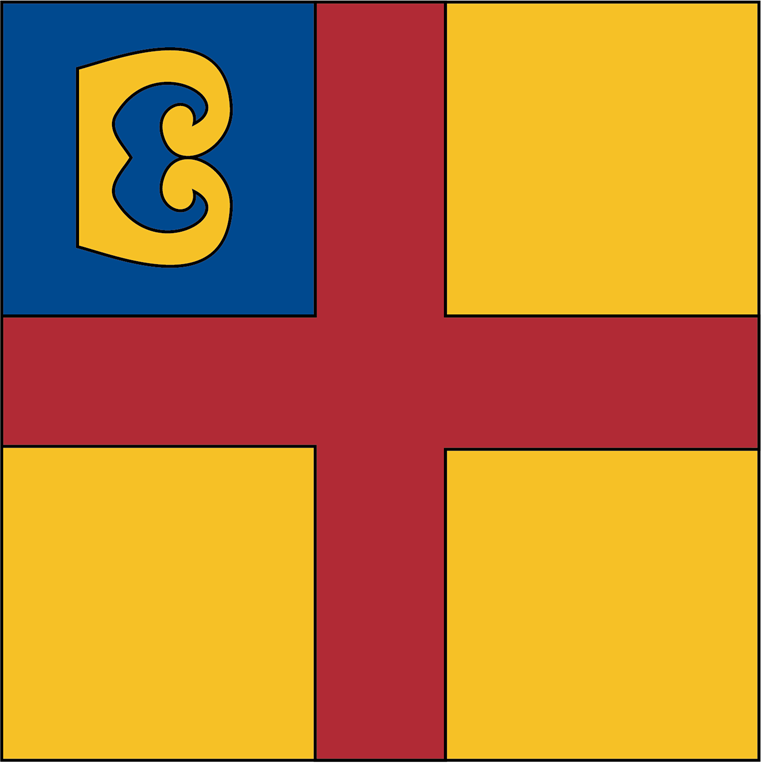
Vranje

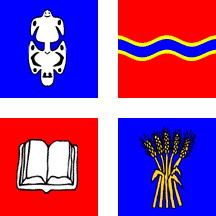
Vrbas

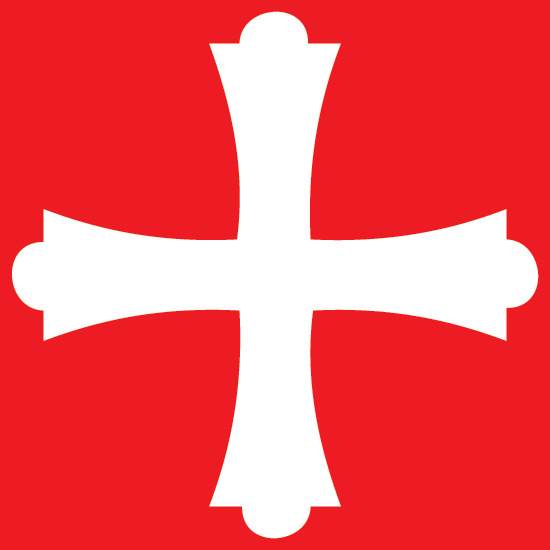
Vrnjačka Banja

Žagubica

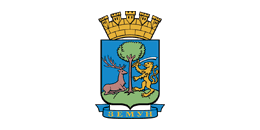
Zemun

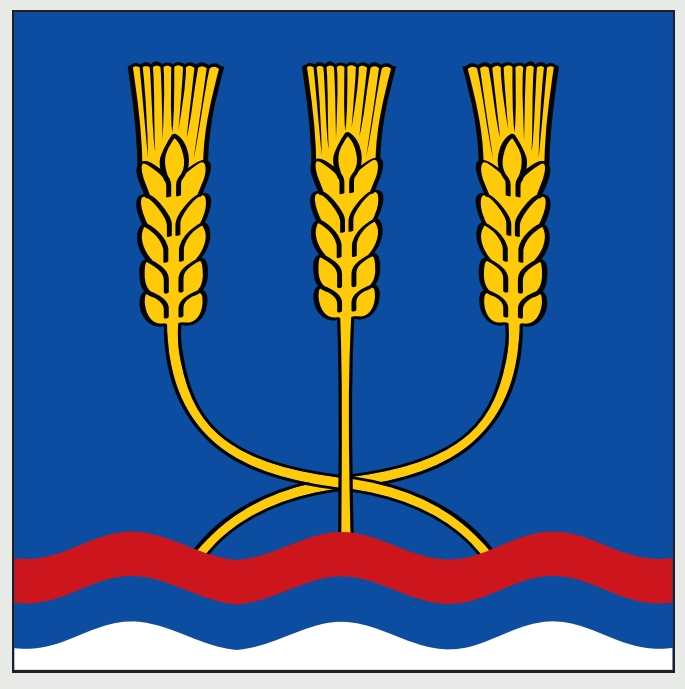
Žitorađa

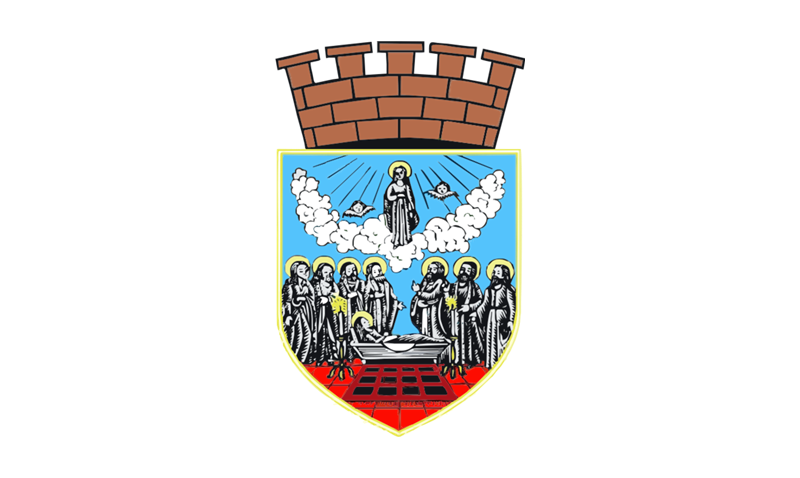
Zrenjanin

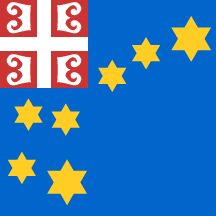
Zvezdara

==== Historical ====
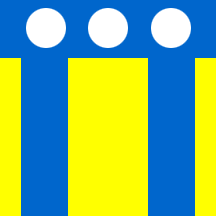
Požarevca (2001–2006)

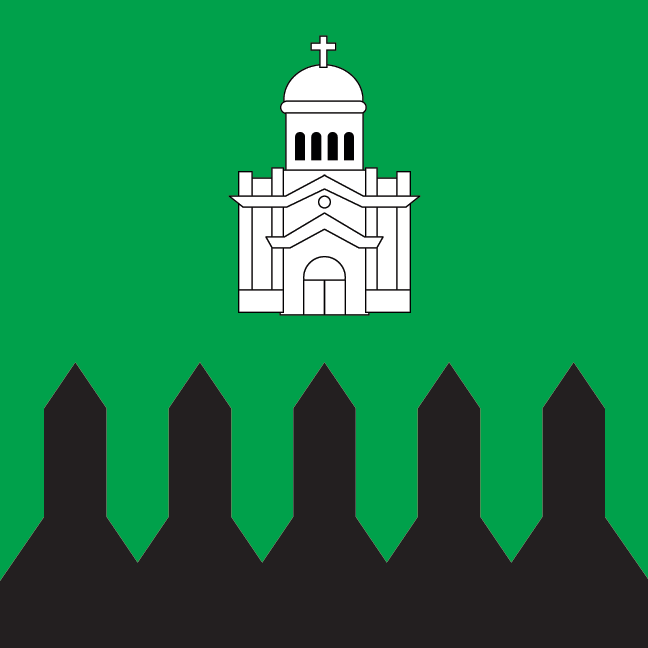
Smederevska Palanka (2003–2009)

Zemun (2003–2005)

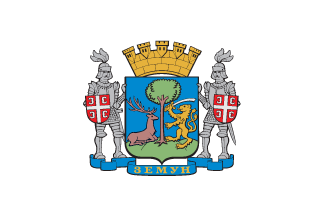
Zemun (2005–2009)

=== Slovenia ===
==== City Municipalities ====
Celje

Kranj

Ljubljana

Maribor

Ptuj

Murska Sobota

Velenje

==== Municipalities ====
Braslovče

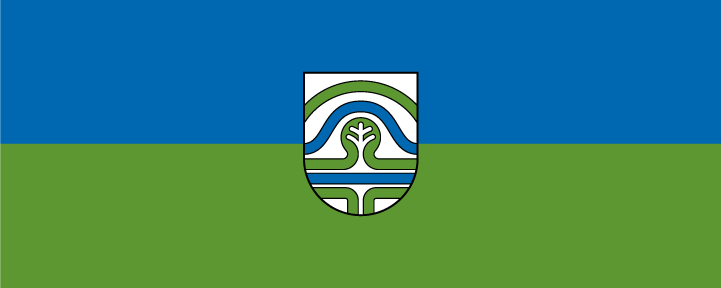
Cerknica

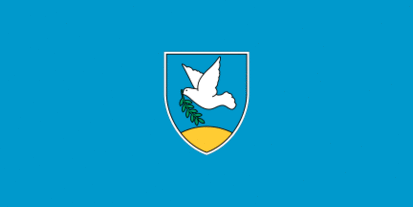
Izola

Jesenice

Kamnik

Koper

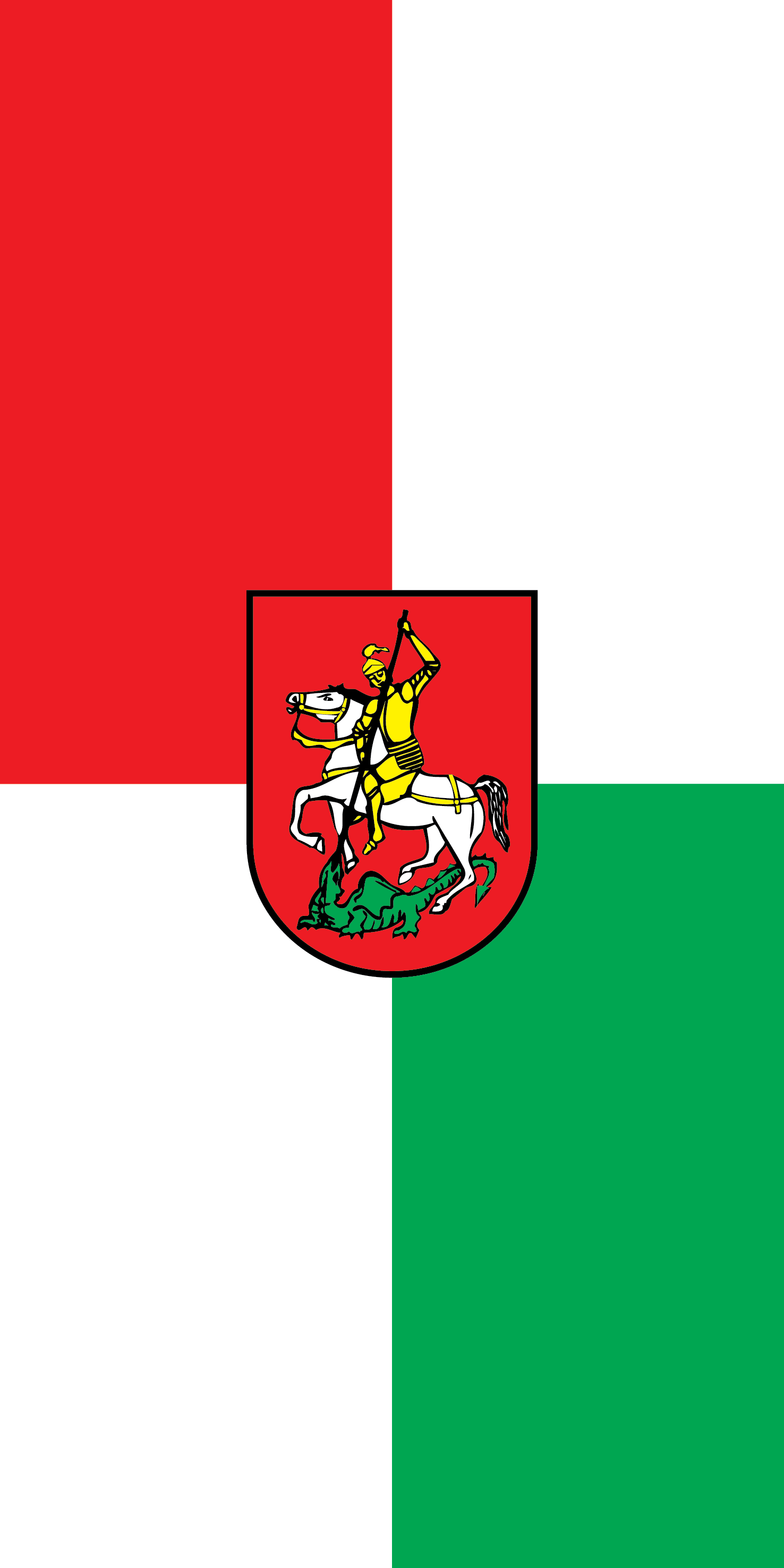
Šentjur

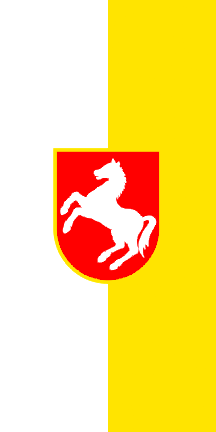
Slovenske Konjice

=== Turkey ===
Ankara

=== Vatican City ===
Vatican City (details)

== Eastern Europe ==
=== Armenia ===
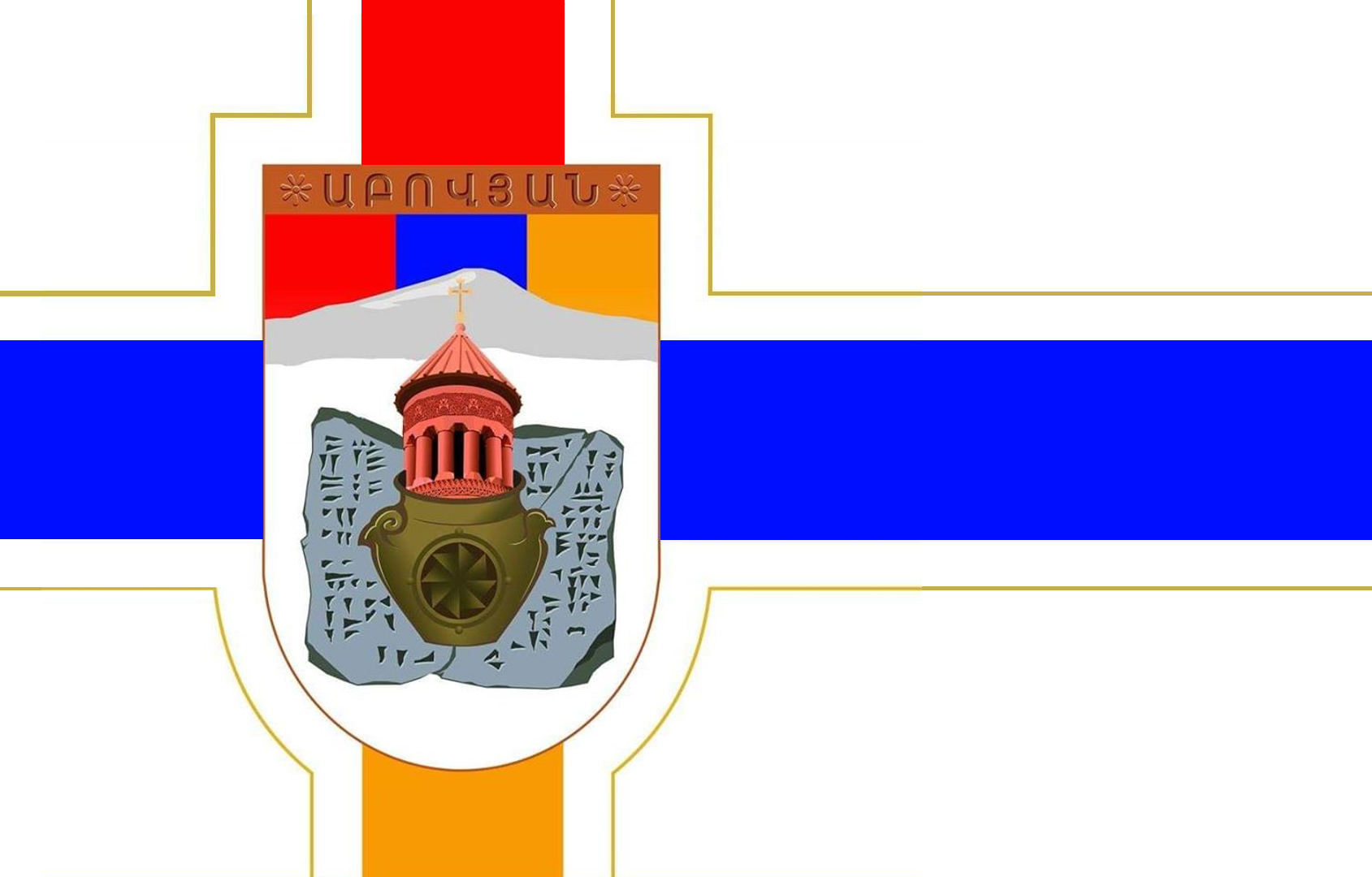
Abovyan

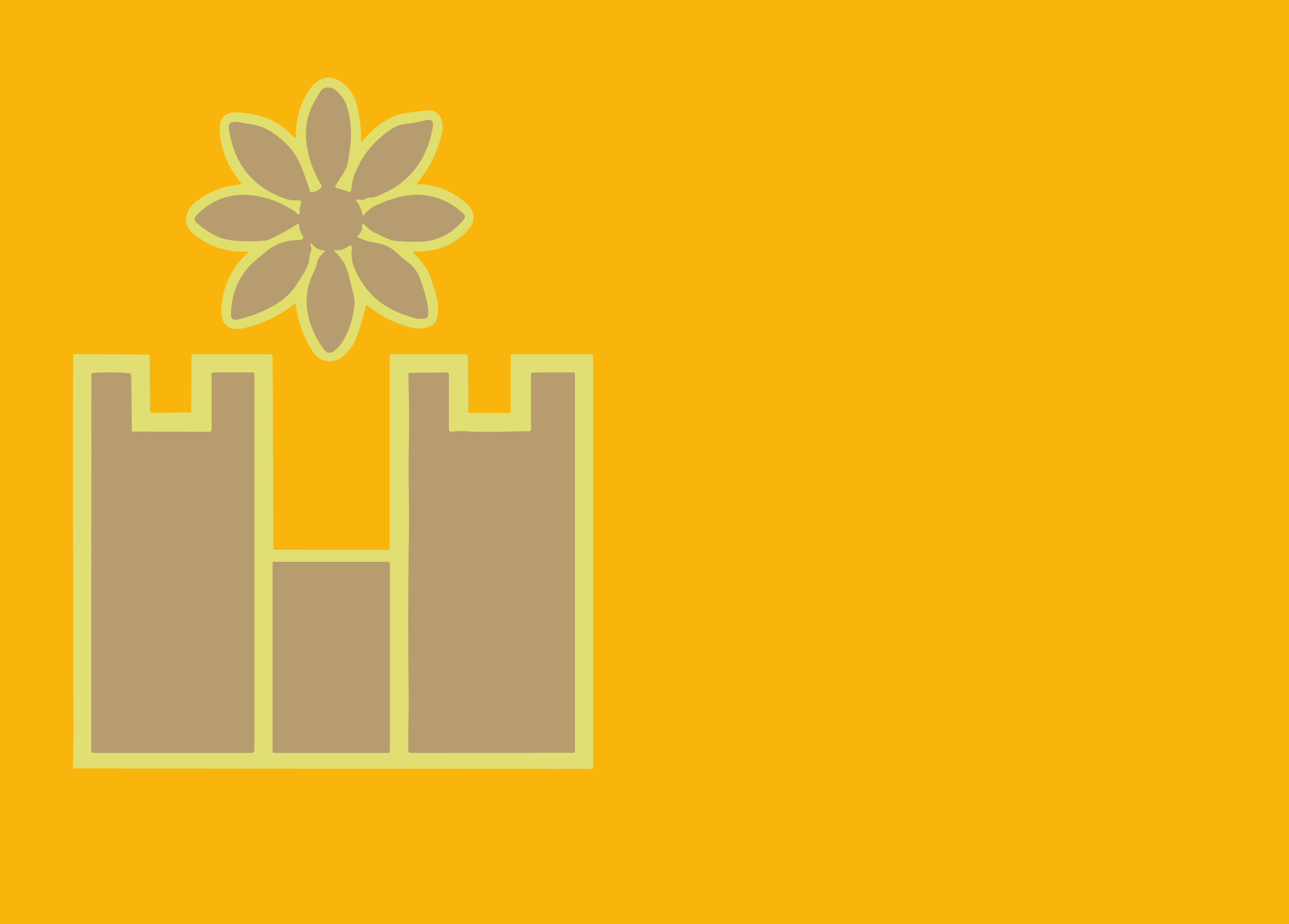
Artashat

Ashtarak

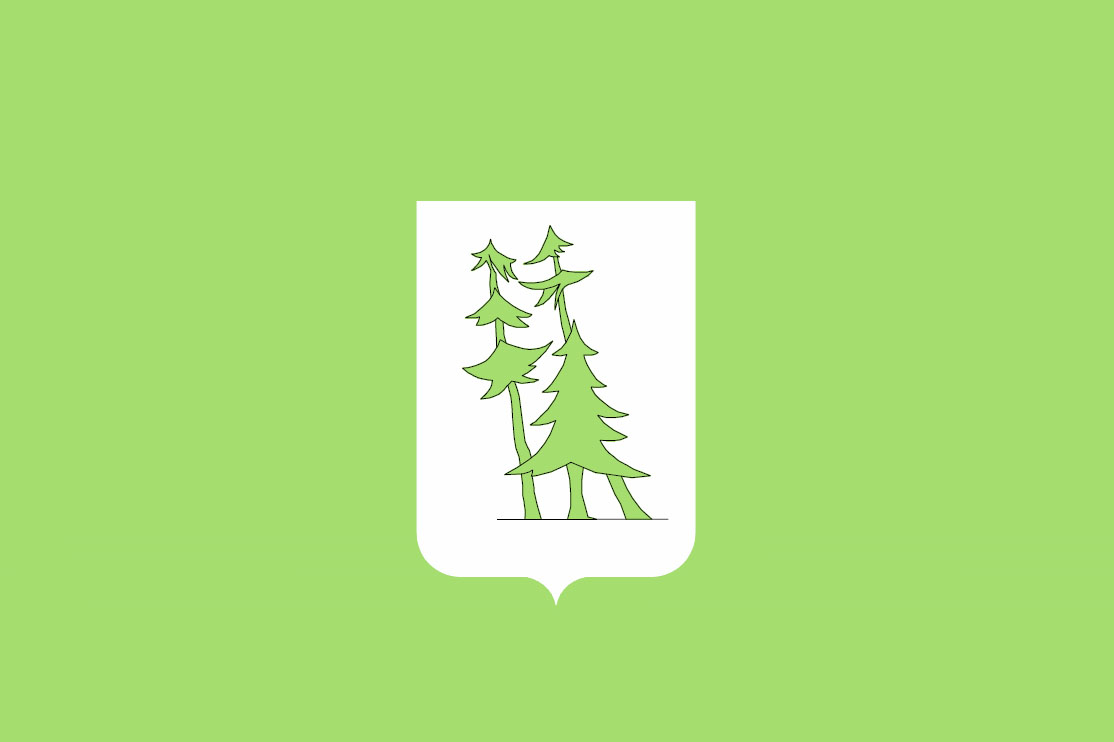
Dilijan

Gyumri

Vagharshapat

Yerevan (details)

=== Azerbaijan ===
Baku

==== Historical ====
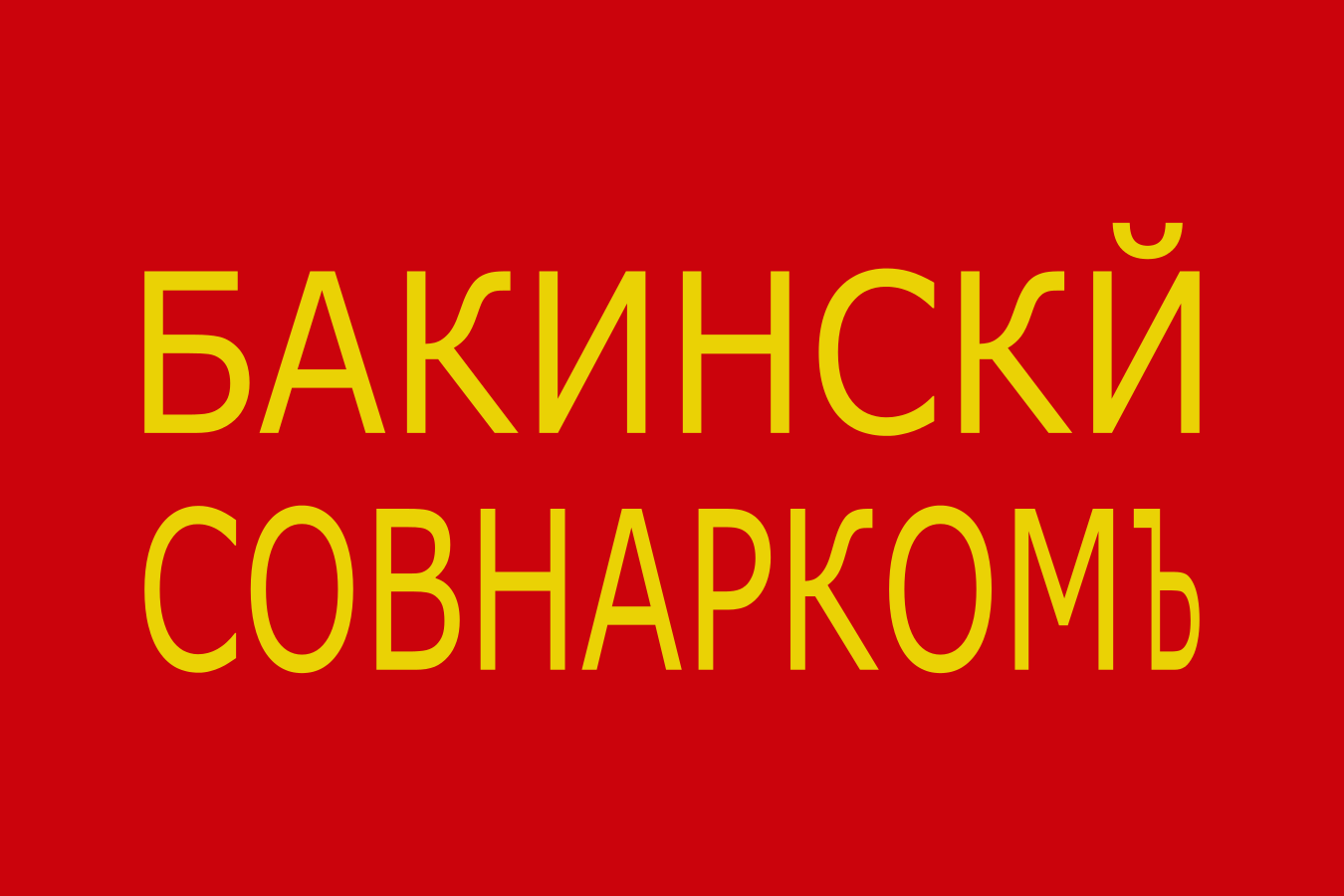
Baku (1918)

===== Artsakh =====
Stepanakert (2012-2023)

=== Cyprus ===
Mesa Geitonia

Nicosia

Strovolos

=== Czech Republic ===
Brno

Prague

=== Georgia ===
Abasha

Akhaltsikhe

Akhmeta

Ambrolauri

Batumi

Bolnisi

Borjomi

Gori

Gurjaani

Khashuri

Kobuleti

Kutaisi (details)

Lagodekhi

Lanchkhuti

Marneuli

Mtskheta

Oni

Poti

Rustavi

Senaki

Tbilisi (details)

Telavi

Tkibuli

Tsalenjikha

Tsalka

Zestaponi

Zugdidi

==== South Ossetia ====
Tskhinvali (Note: Non-free flag not shown; see linked article for image)

=== Moldova ===
Anenii Noi

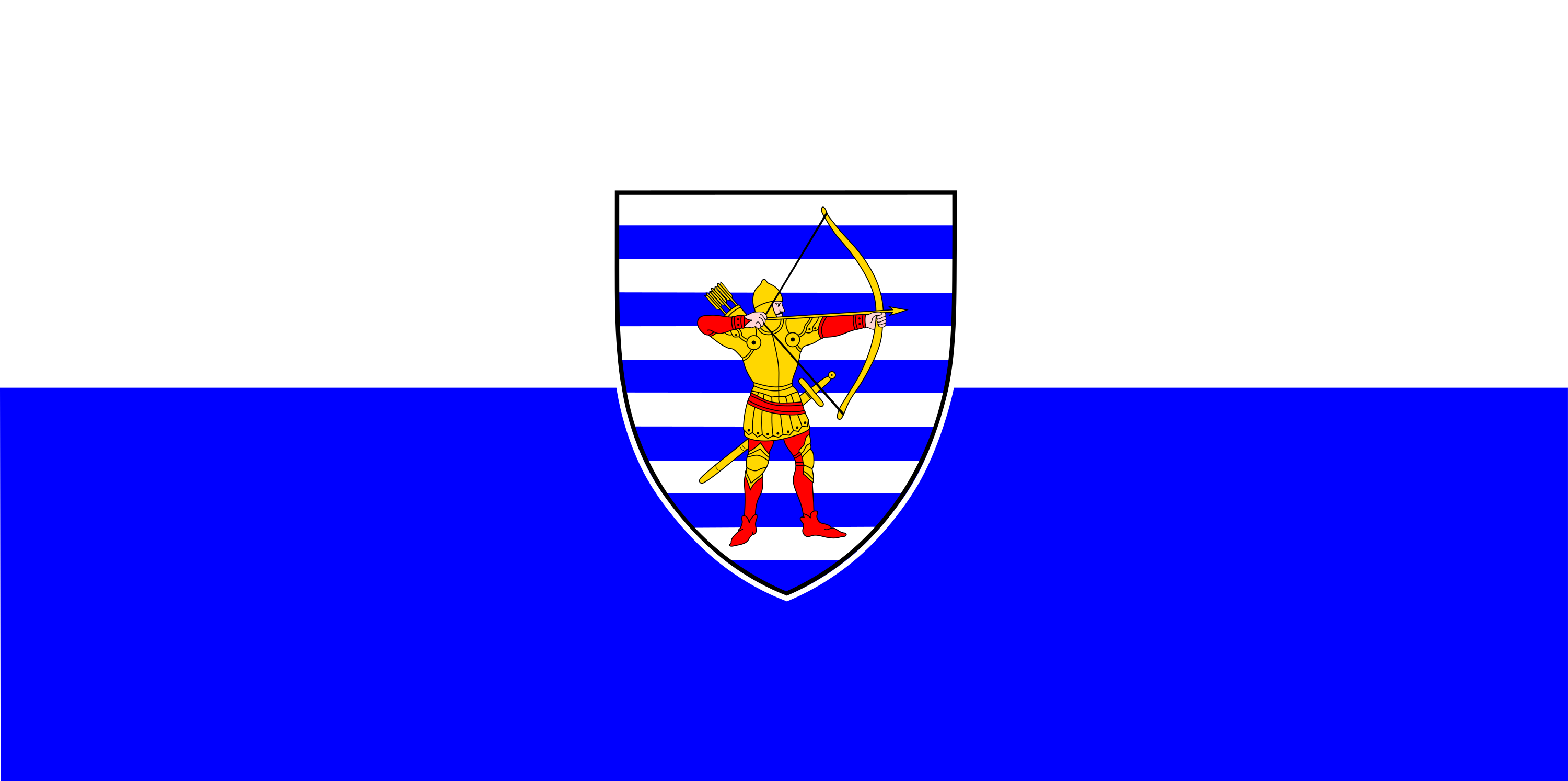
Bălţi

Briceni

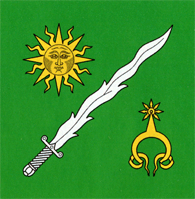
Budești

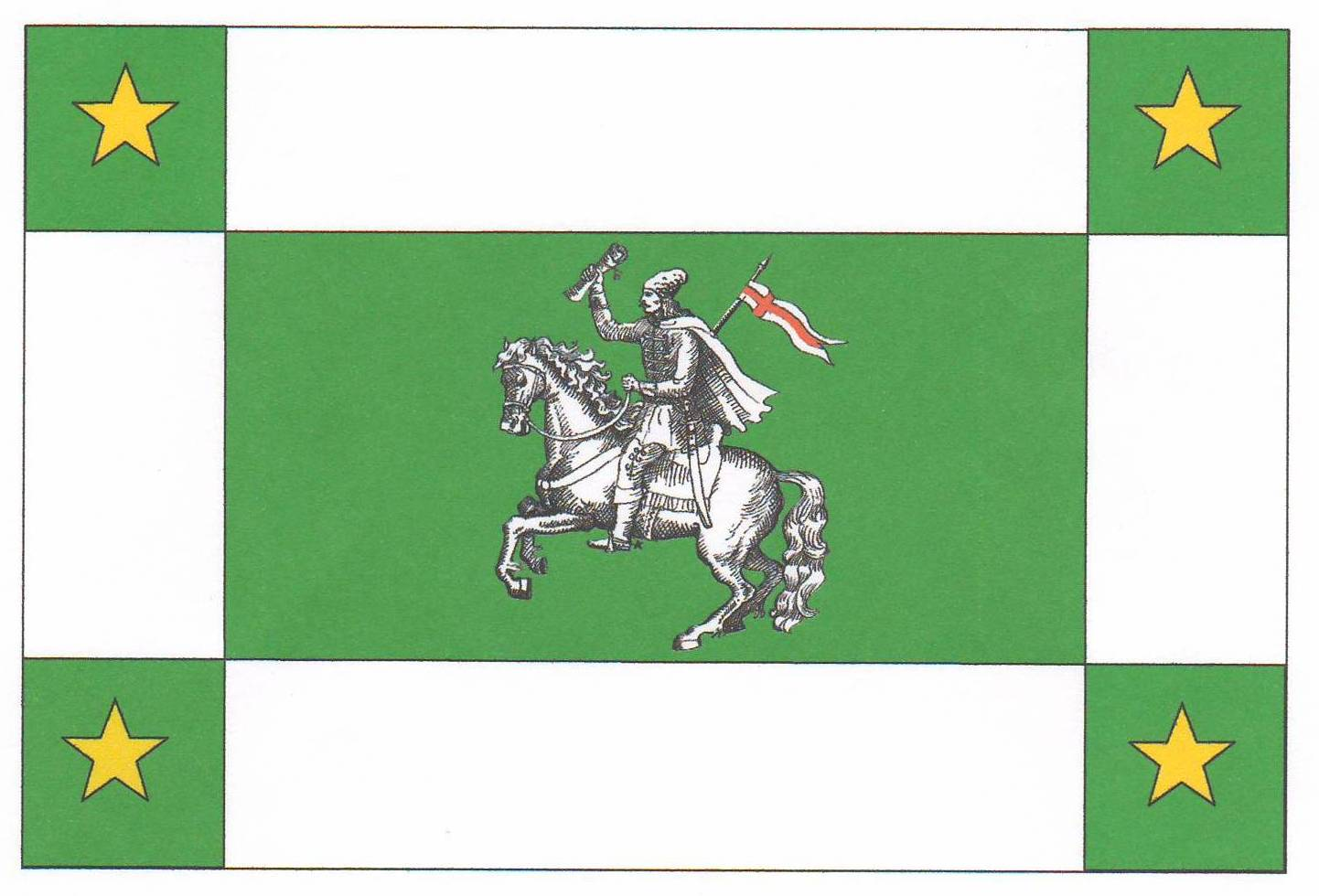
Călărași

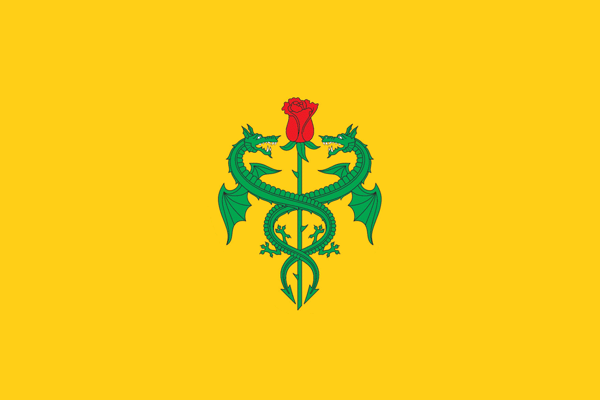
Cantemir

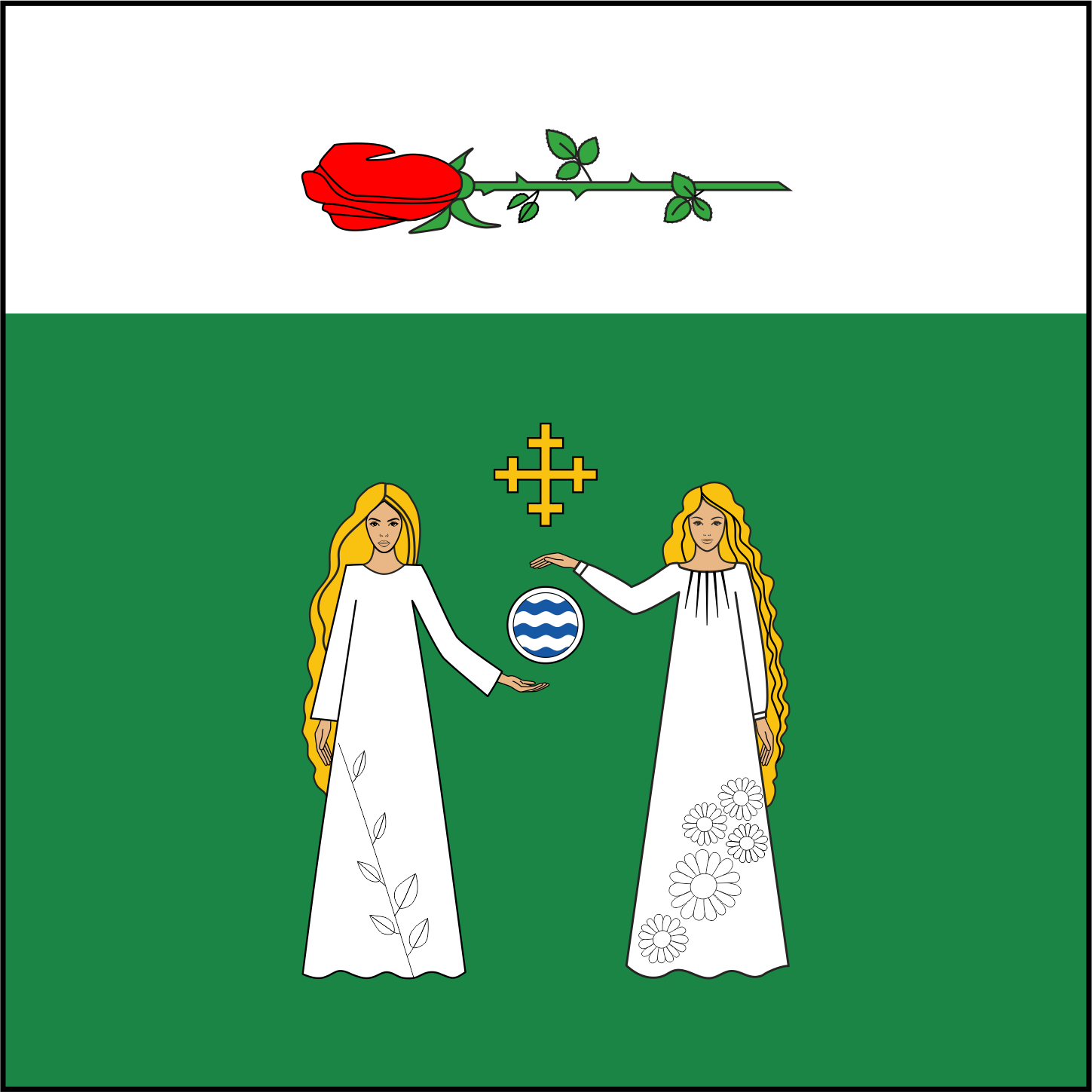
Capaclia

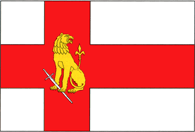
Căușeni

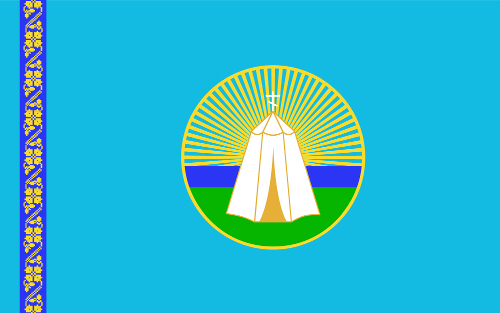
Ceadîr-Lunga

Chișinău

Cimișlia (details)

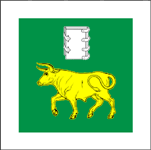
Ciorescu

Codru

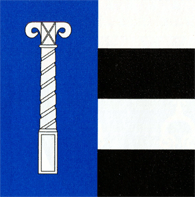
Colonița

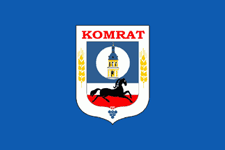
Comrat

Cuhureștii de Sus

Cupcini

Drochia

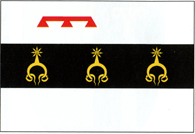
Durlești

Edineț

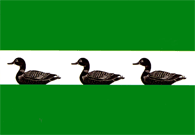
Fălești

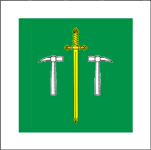
Făurești

Florești

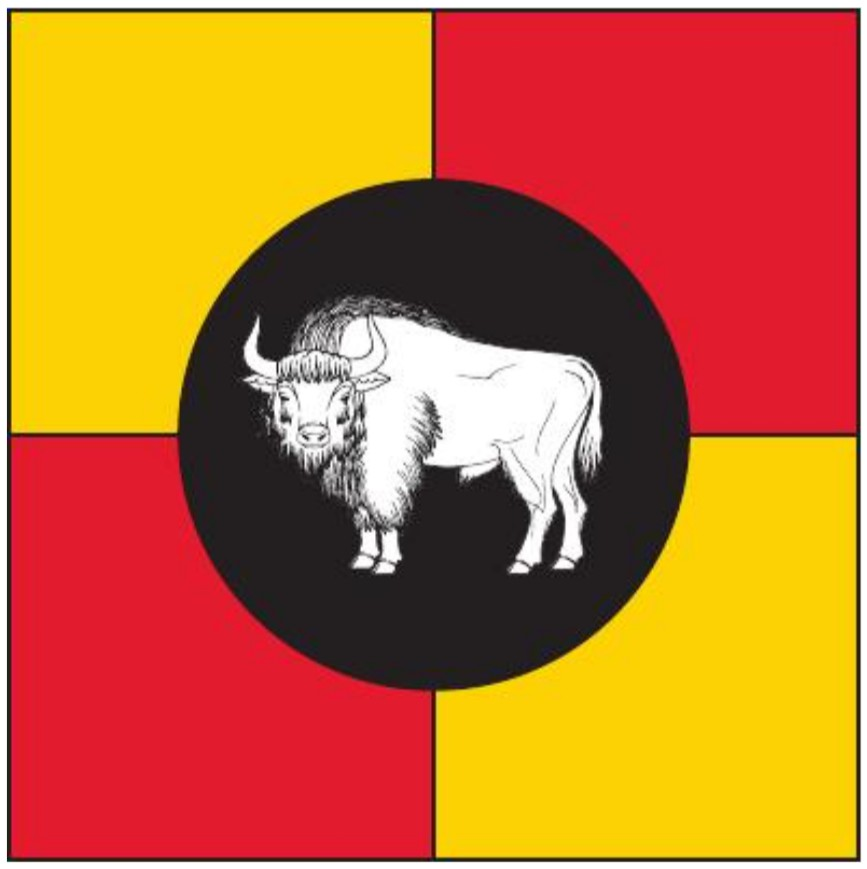
Găureni

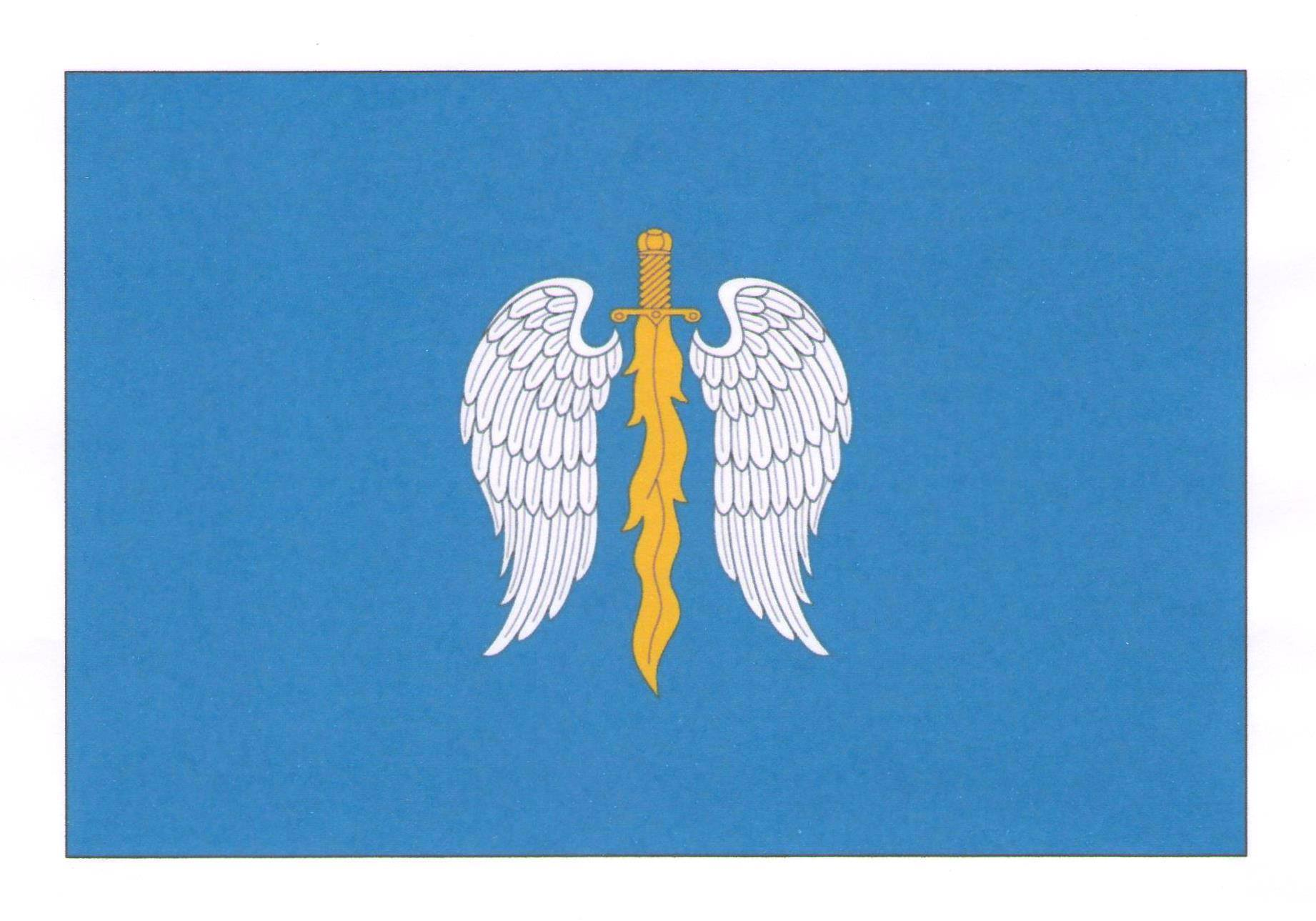
Glodeni

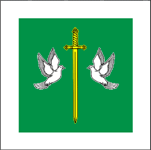
Goian

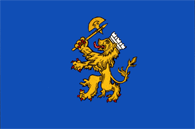
Hîncești

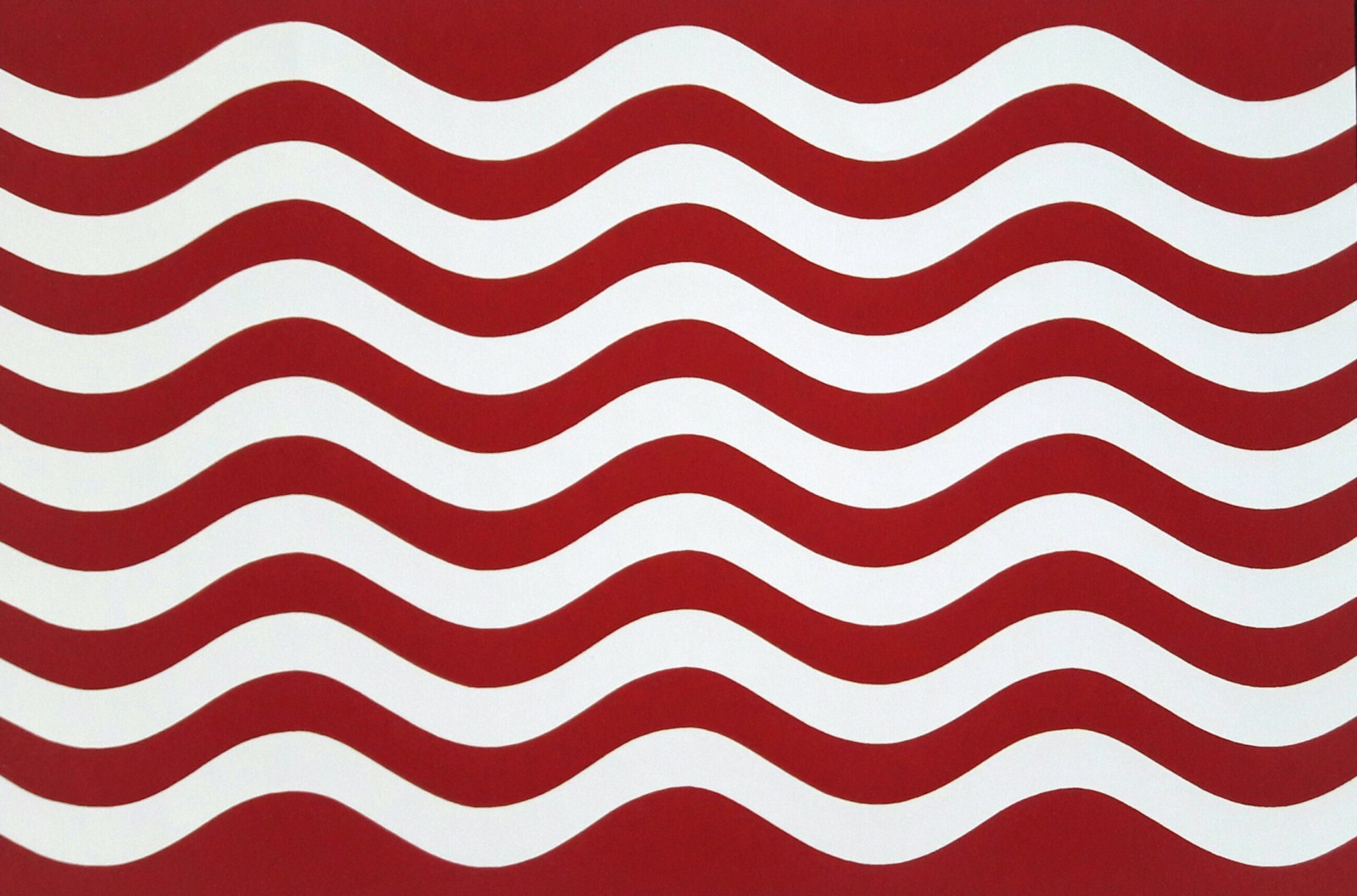
Ialoveni

Lăpușna

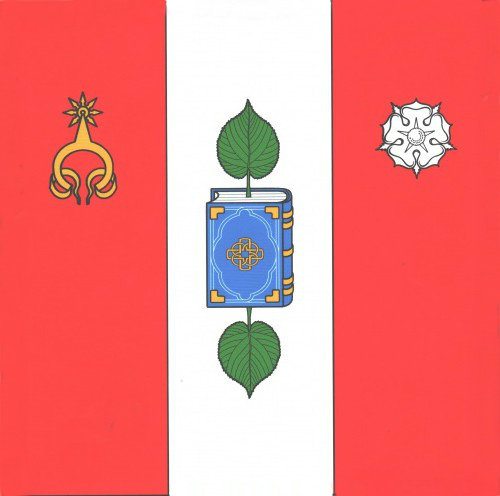
Larga

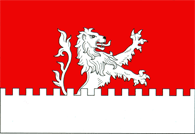
Leova

Mingir

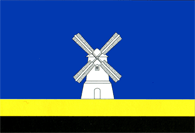
Nisporeni

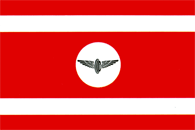
Ocnița

Orhei

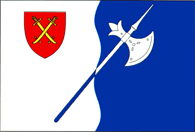
Otaci

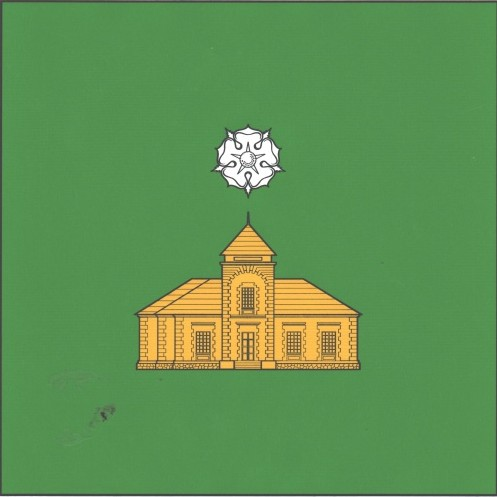
Pavlovca

Rezina

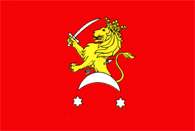
Sîngerei

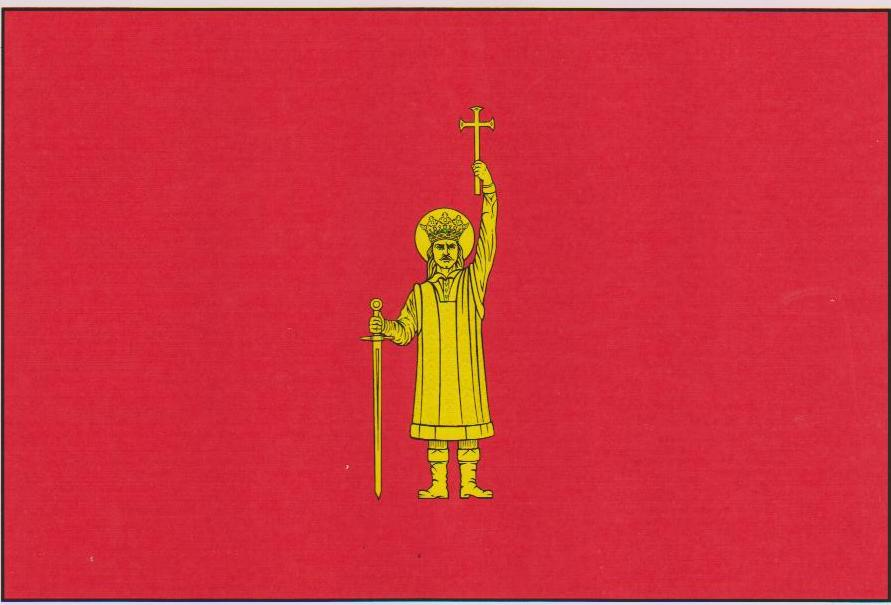
Ștefan Vodă

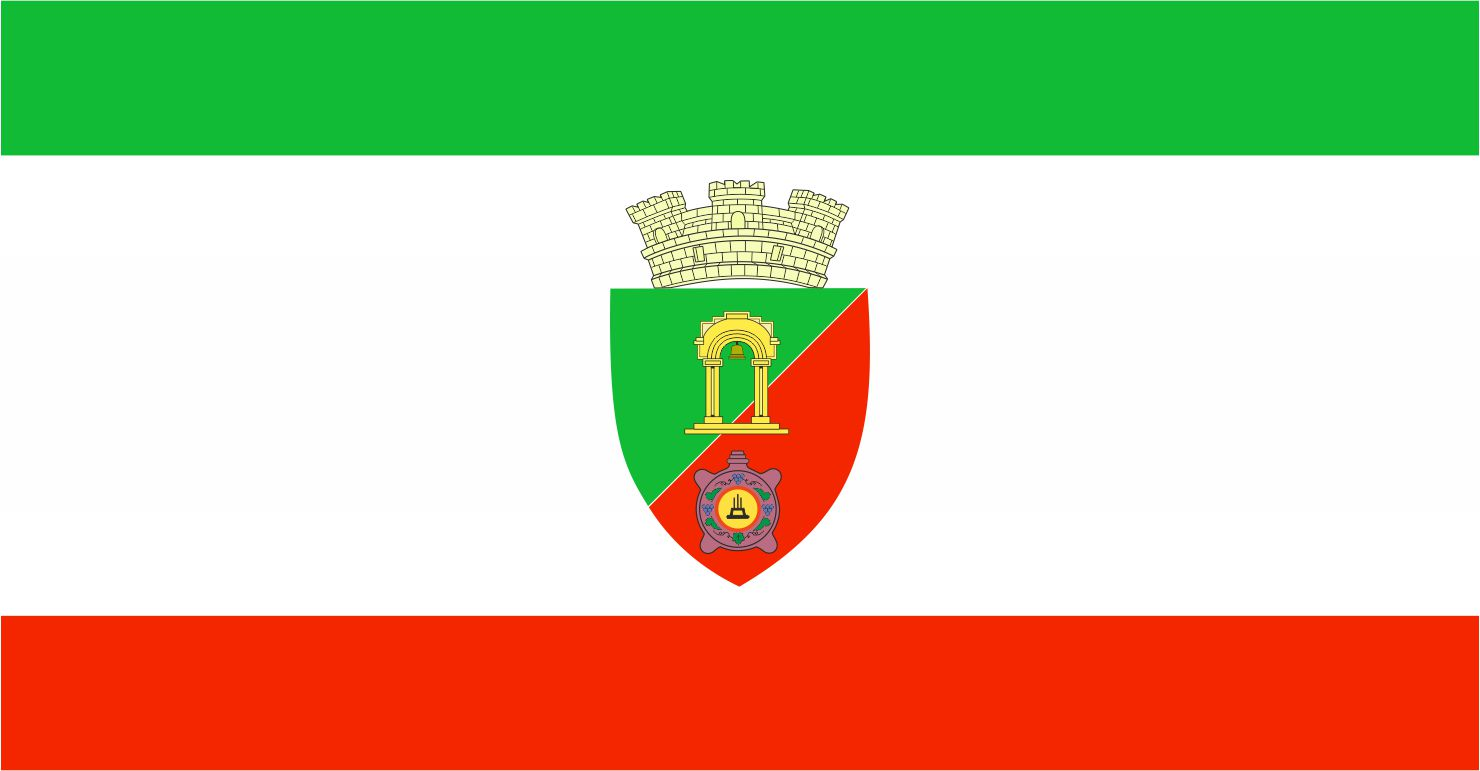
Taraclia

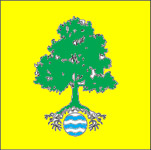
Ulmu

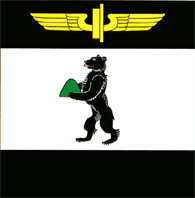
Unchitești

Ungheni

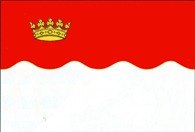
Vadul lui Vodă

Zaim

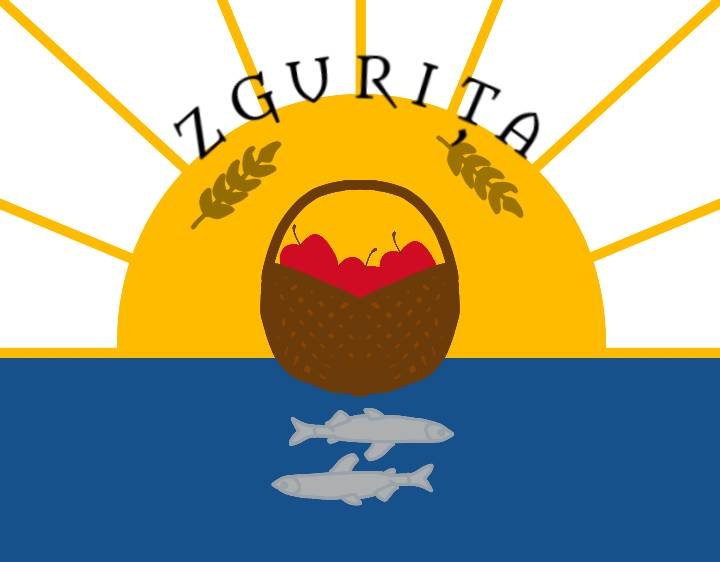
Zgurița

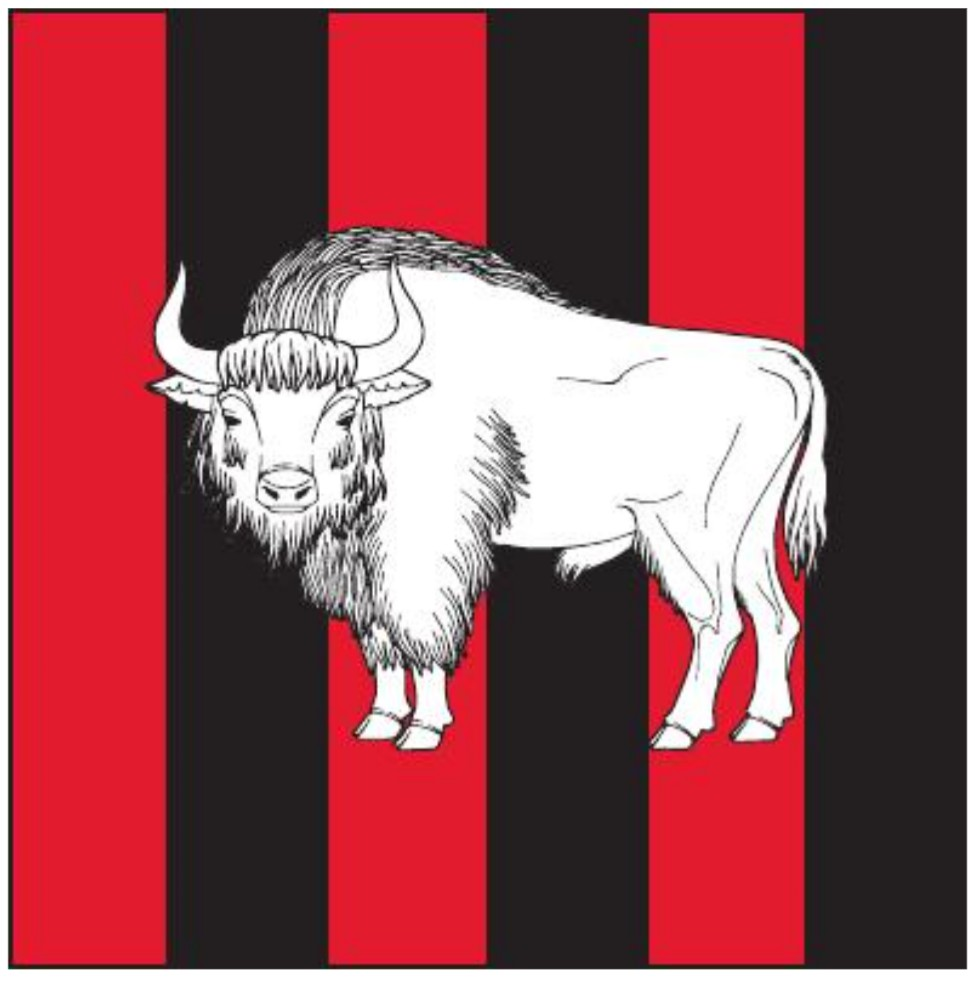
Zîmbreni

==== Transnistria ====
Bender

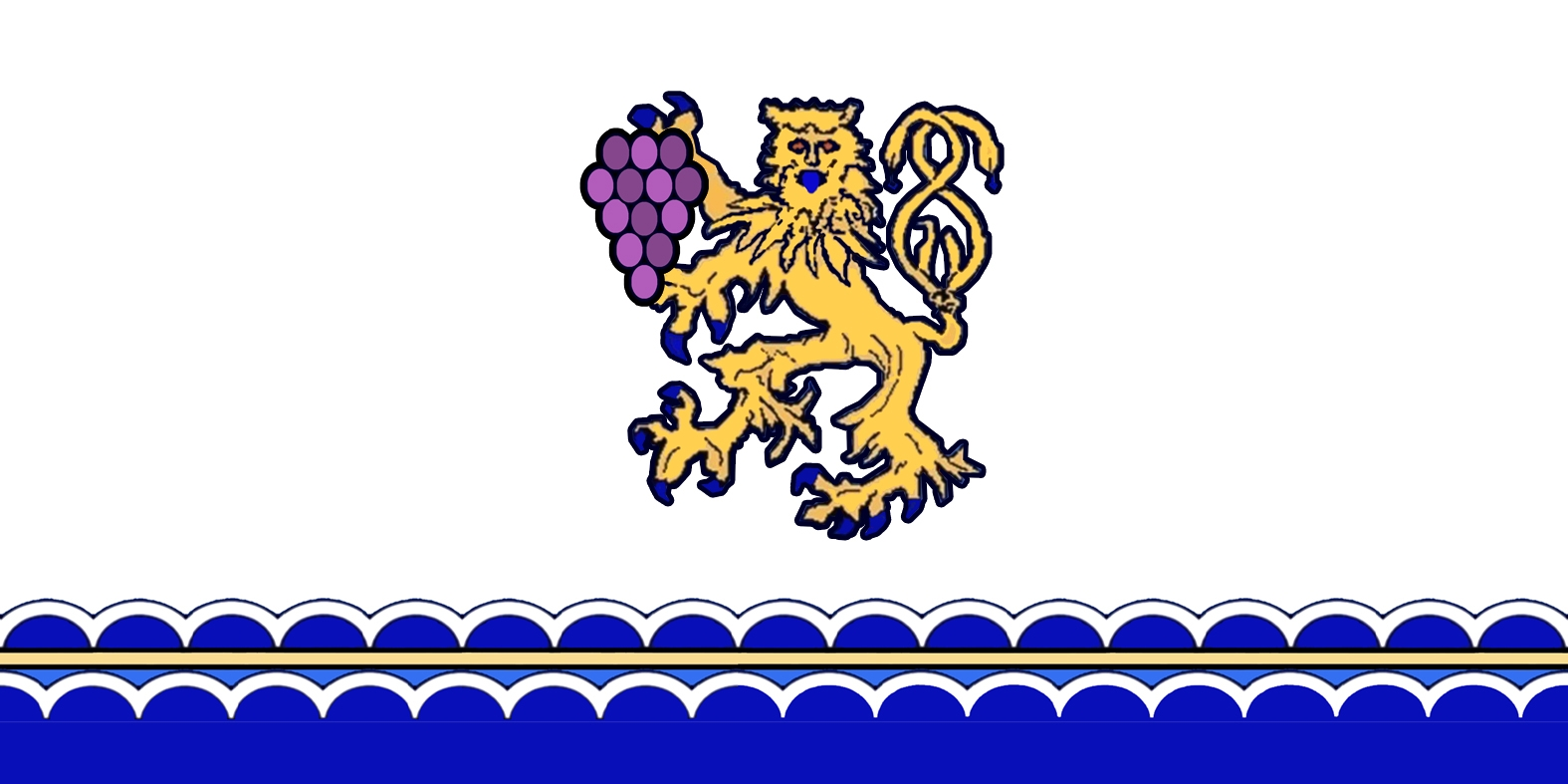
Camenca

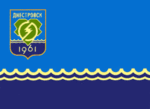
Dnestrovsc

Dubăsari

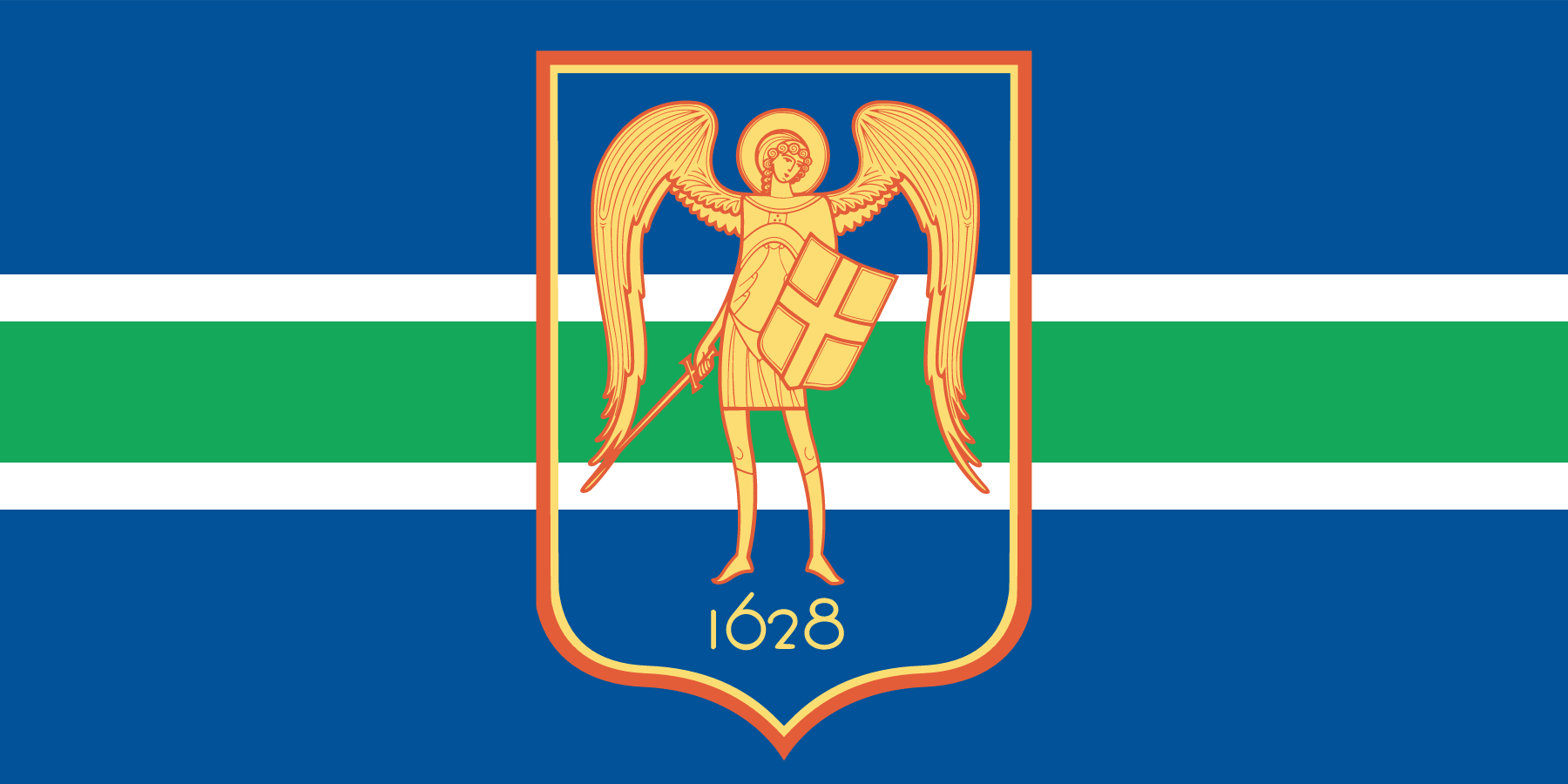
Rîbnița

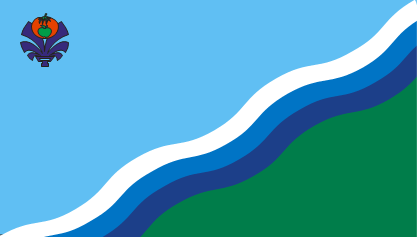
Slobozia

Tiraspol (details)

=== European Russia ===
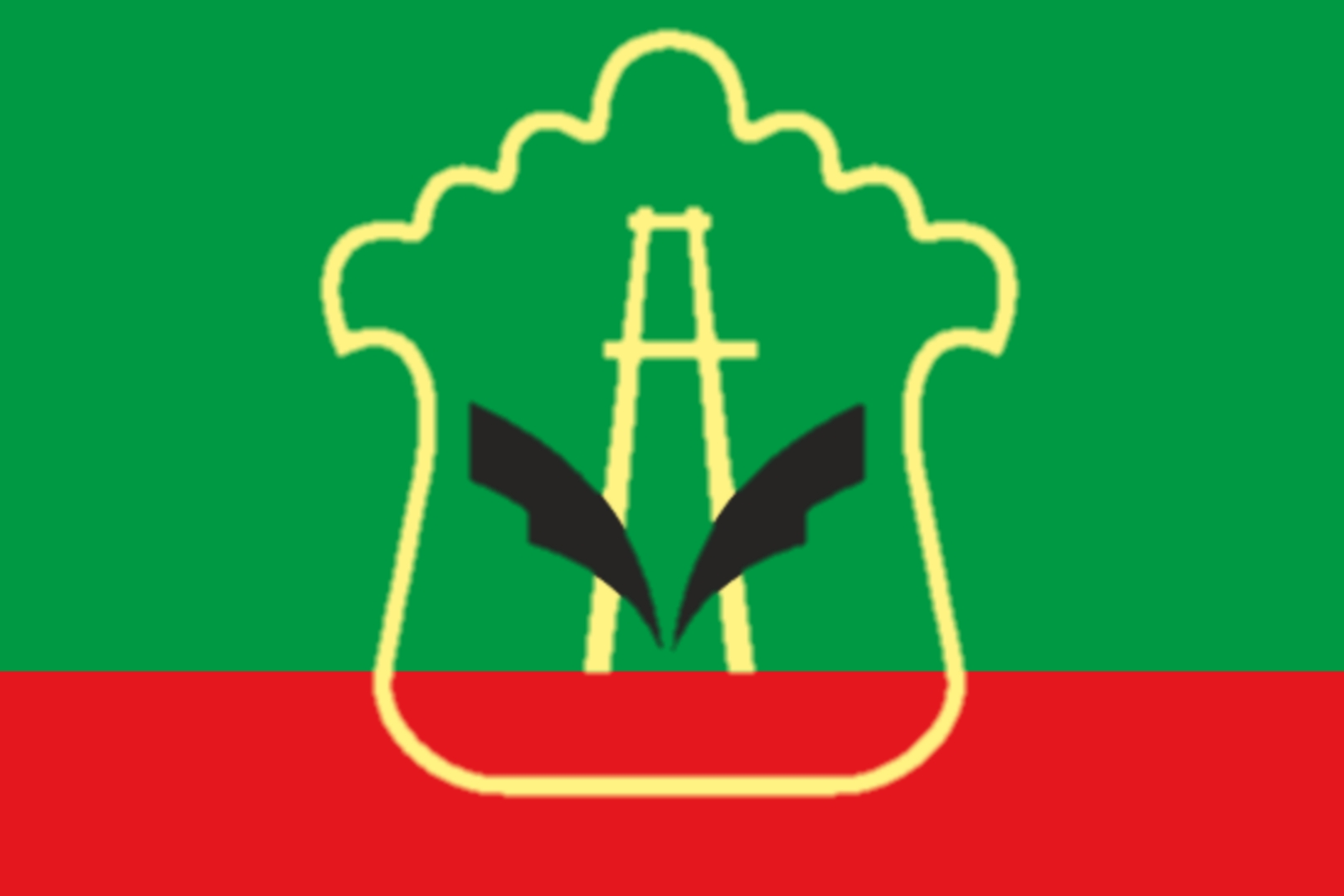
Almetyevsk

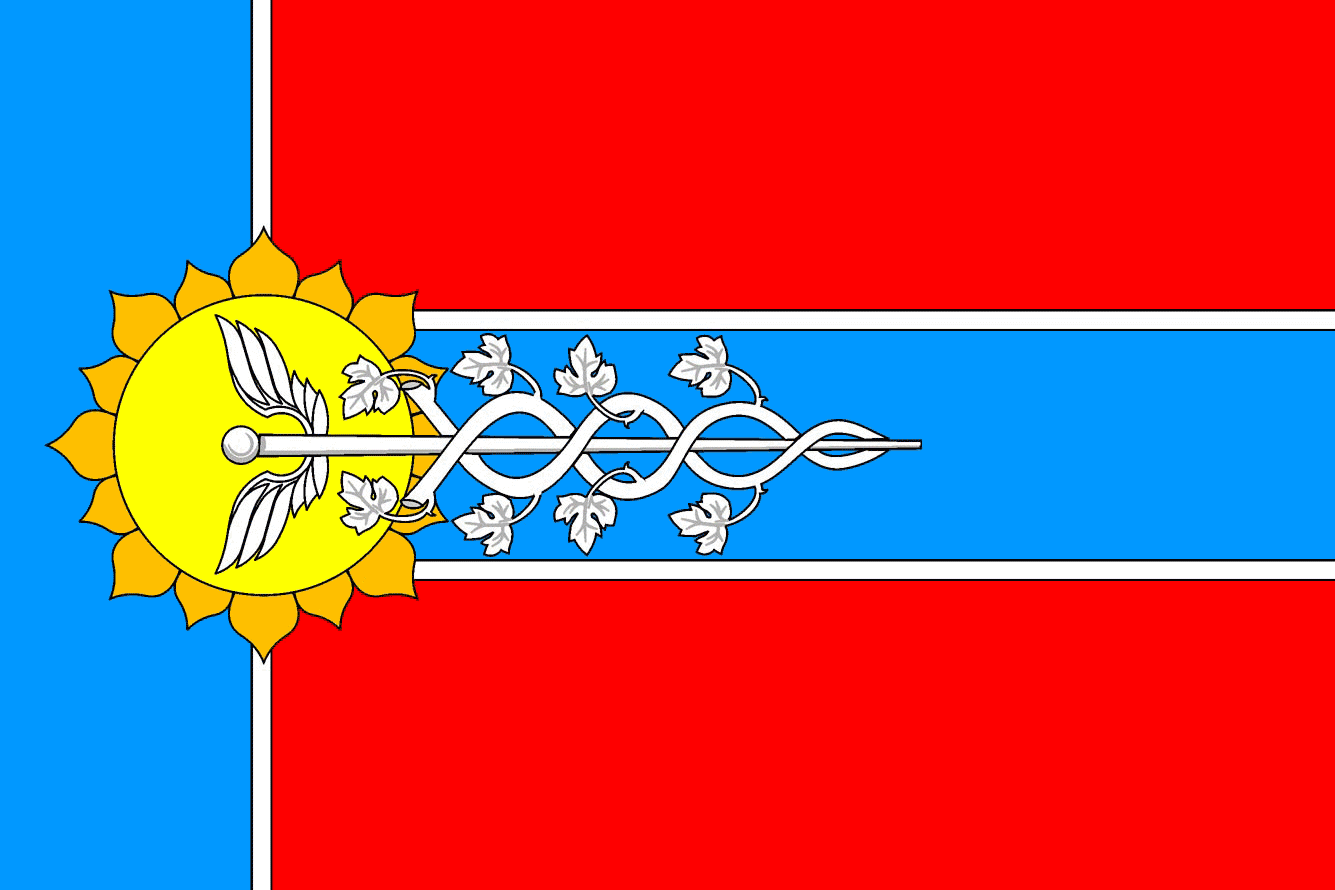
Armavir
(Details)

Arzamas

Astrakhan

Balashikha

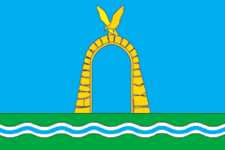
Bataysk

Belgorod

Berezniki

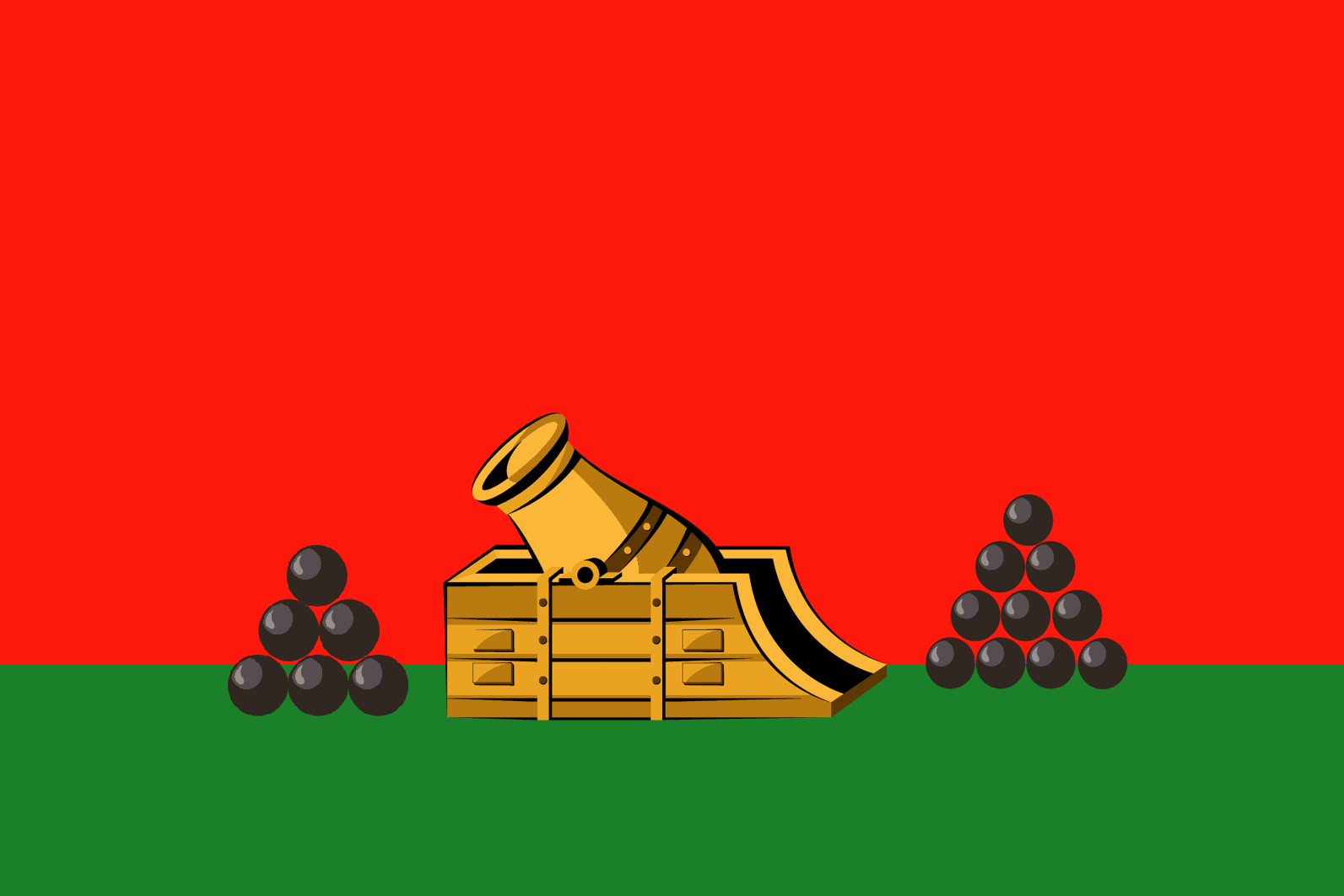
Bryansk

Cheboksary

Cherepovets

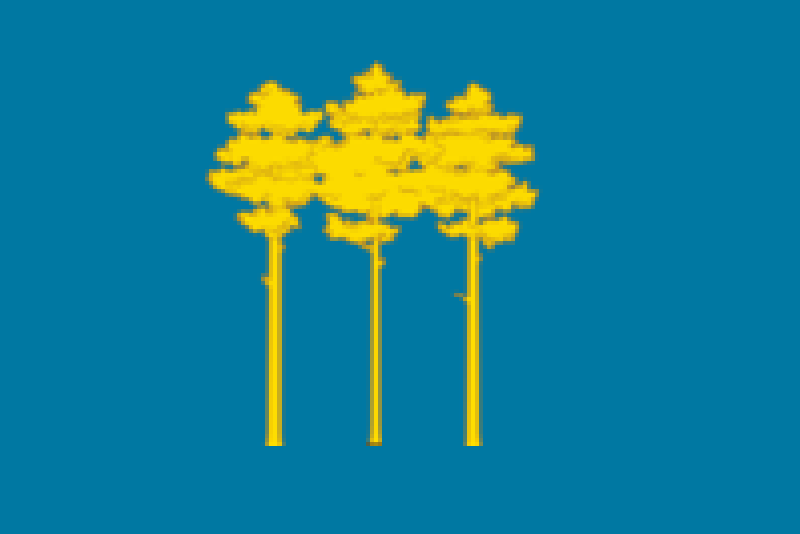
Dimitrovgrad

Domodedovo

Elektrostal

Elista

Engels

Grozny

Ivanovo

Izhevsk

Kaliningrad

Kaluga

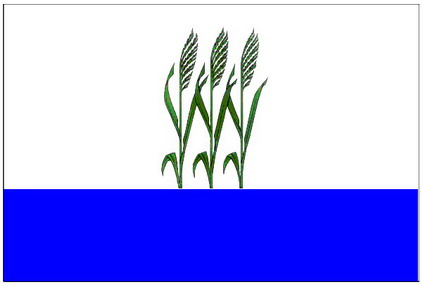
Kamyshin

Kazan

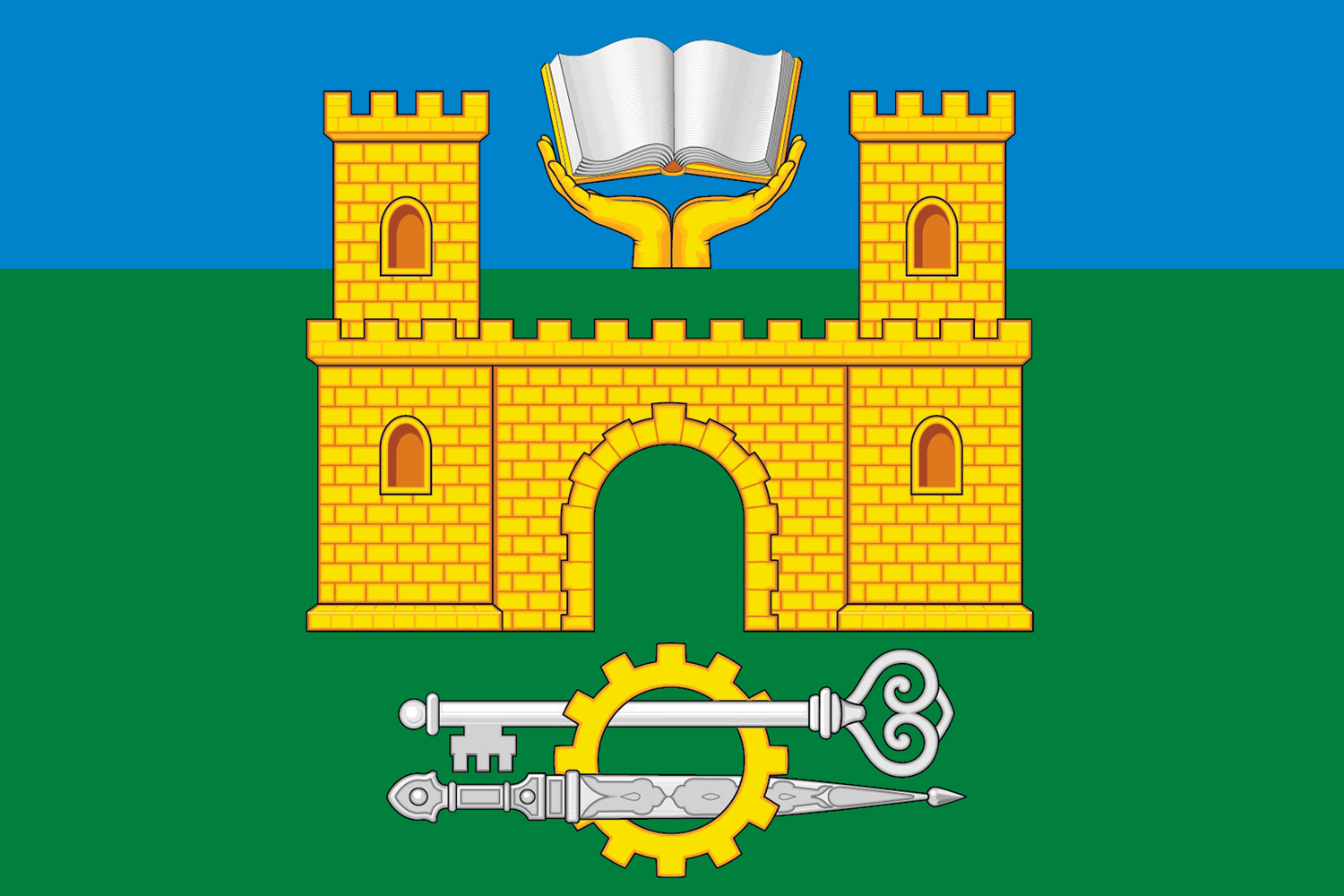
Khasavyurt

Khimki

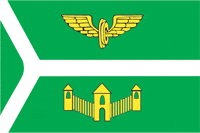
Kinel

Kirov

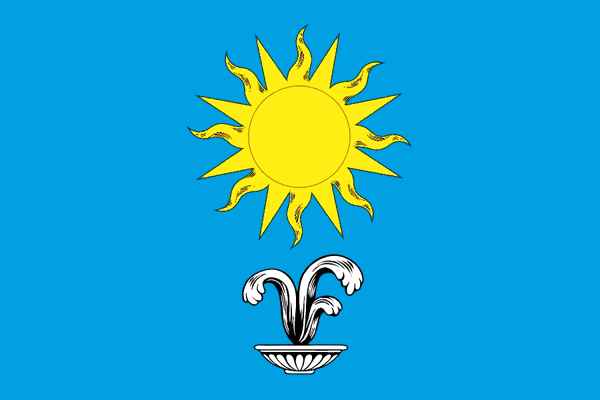
Kislovodsk

Kolomna

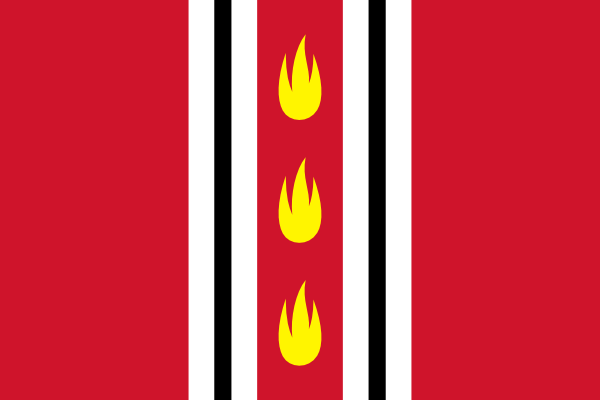
Kolpino

Korolyov

Kostroma

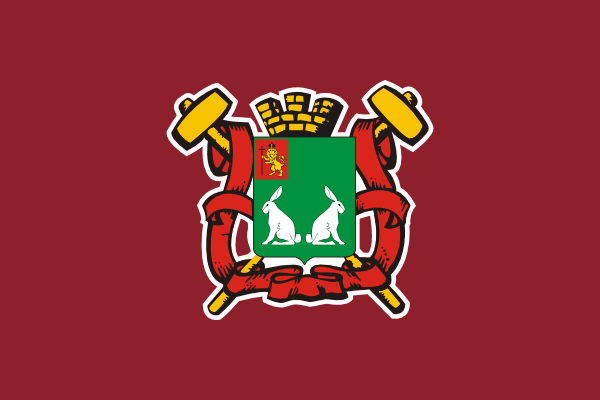
Kovrov

Krasnodar

Krasnogorsk

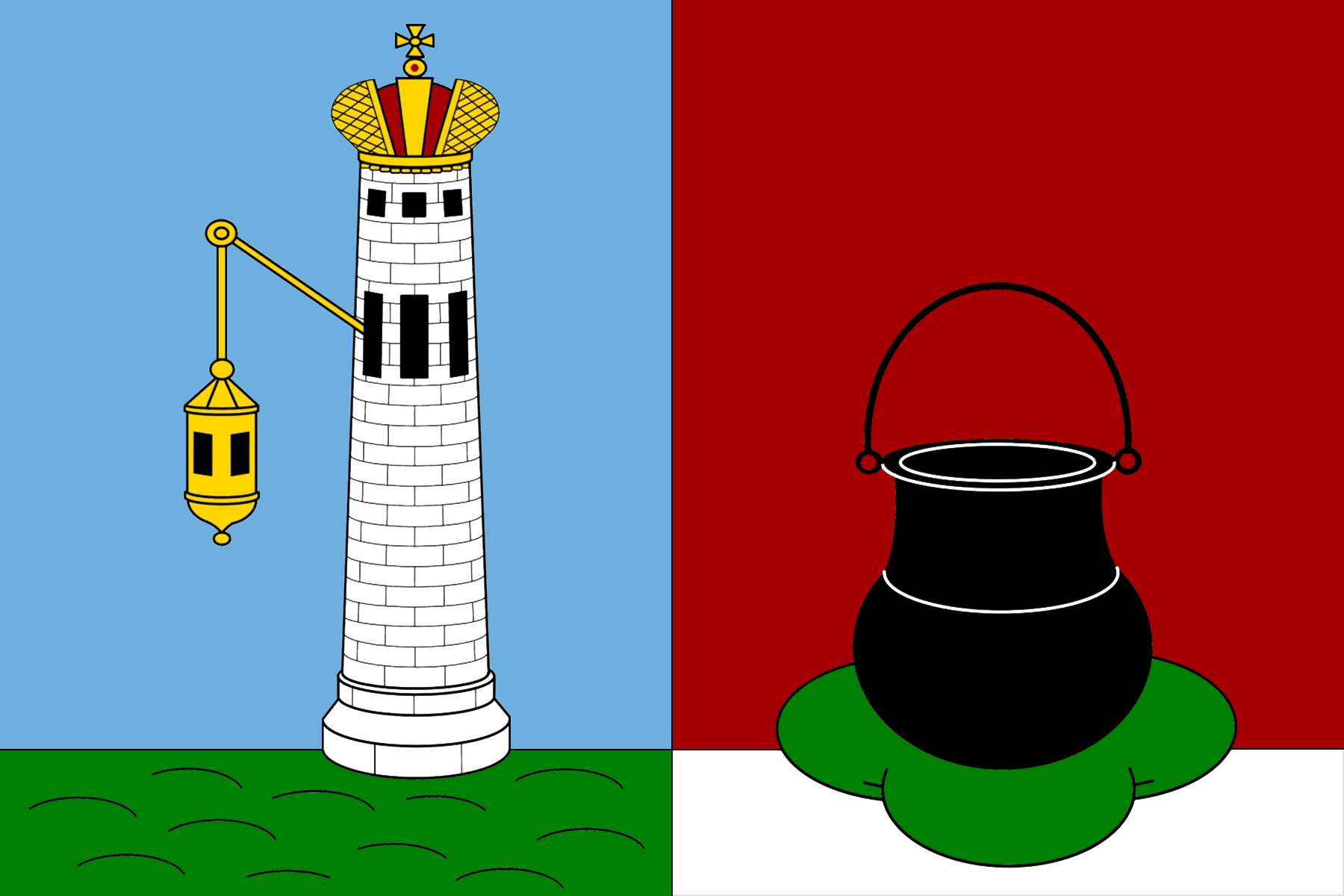
Kronstadt

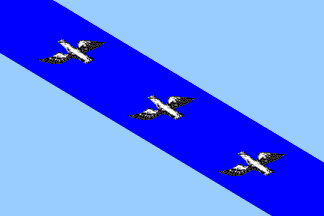
Kursk

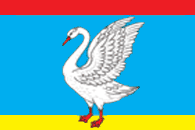
Lebedyan

Lipetsk

Lyubertsy

Makhachkala

Maykop

Moscow
(details)

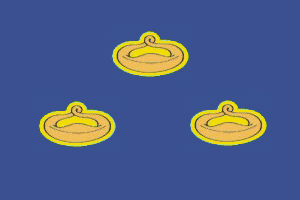
Murom

Mytishchi

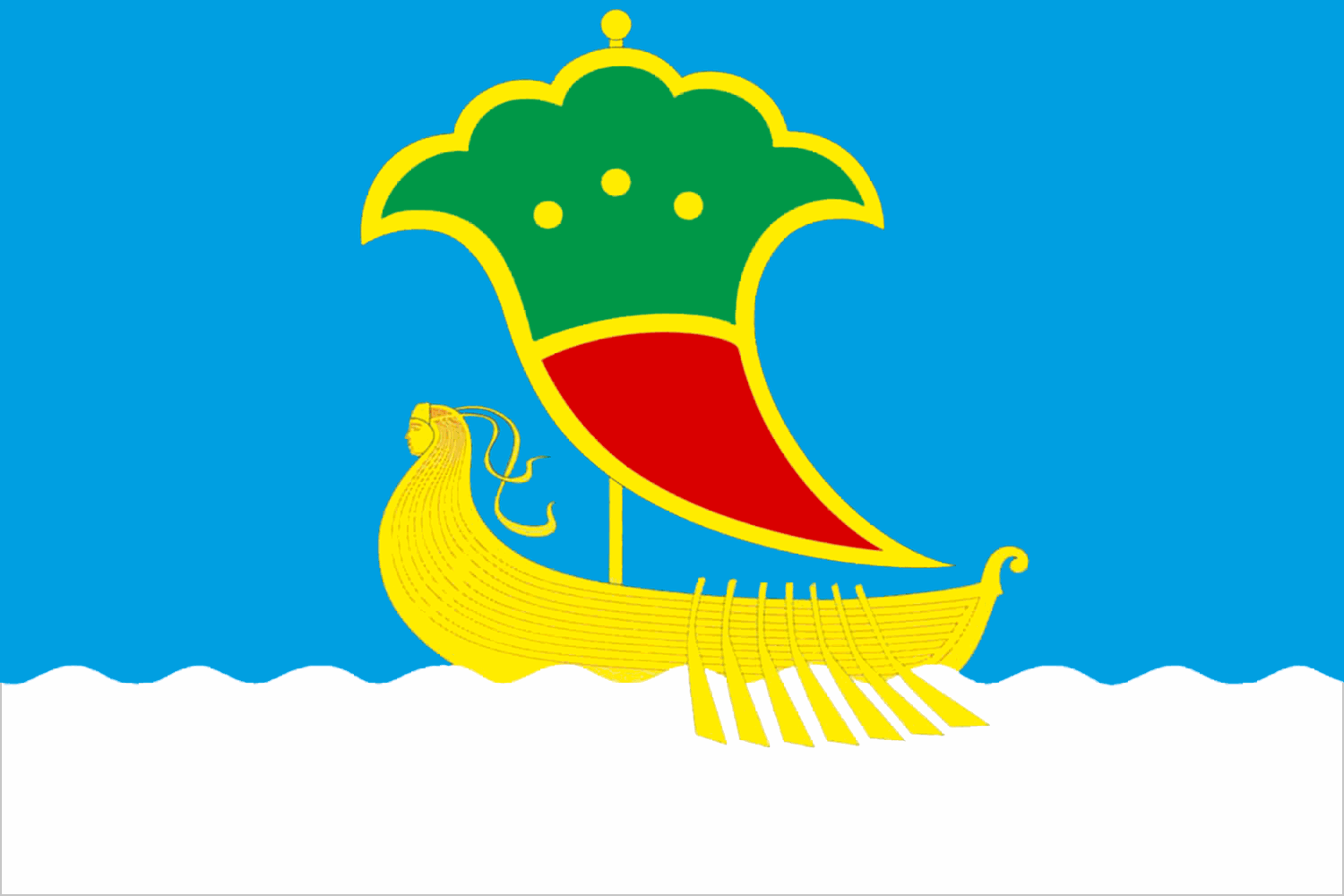
Naberezhnye Chelny

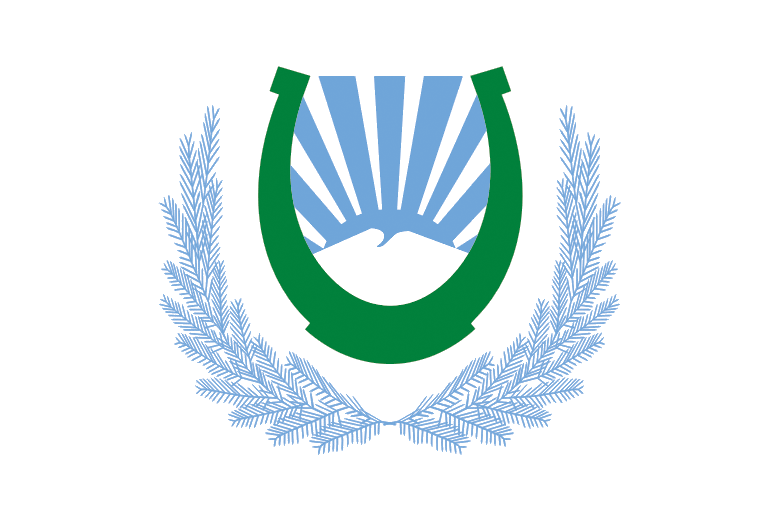
Nalchik

Nazran

Neftekamsk

Nevinnomyssk

Nizhnekamsk

Nizhny Novgorod

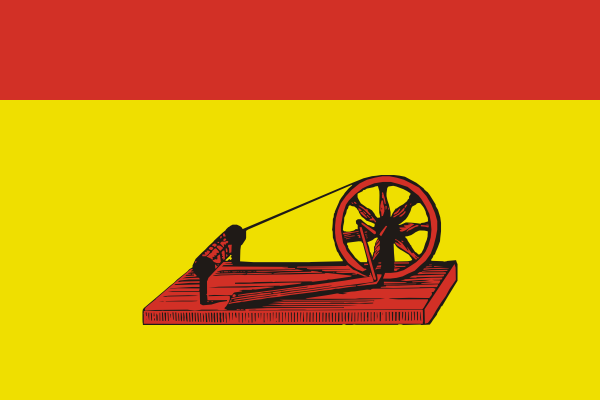
Noginsk

Novocheboksarsk

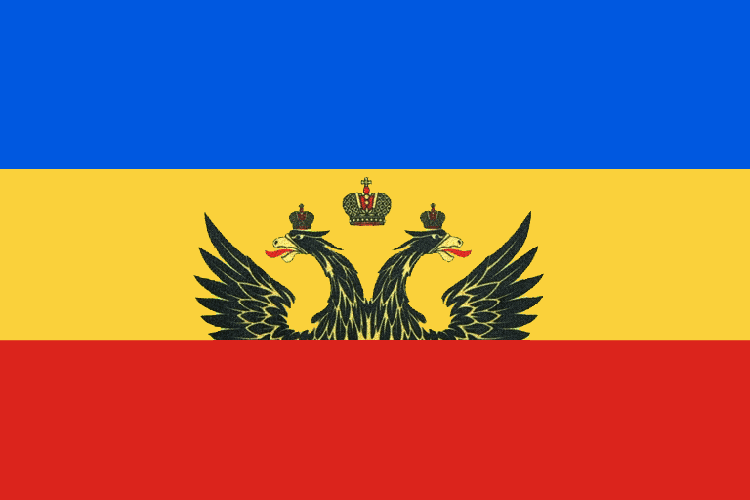
Novocherkassk

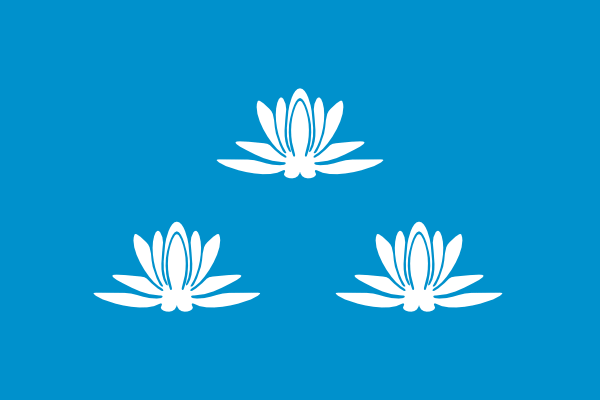
Novokuybyshevsk

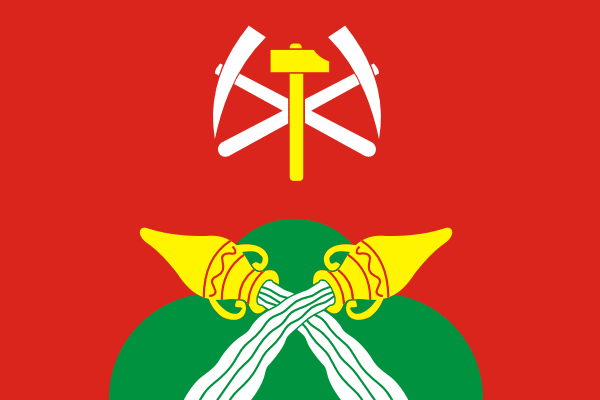
Novomoskovsk

Novorossiysk

Obninsk

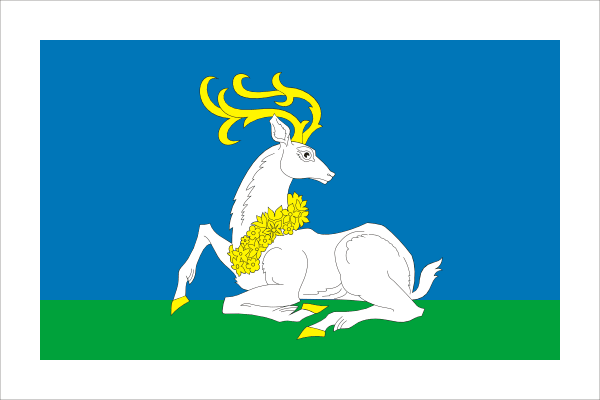
Odintsovo

Oktyabrsky

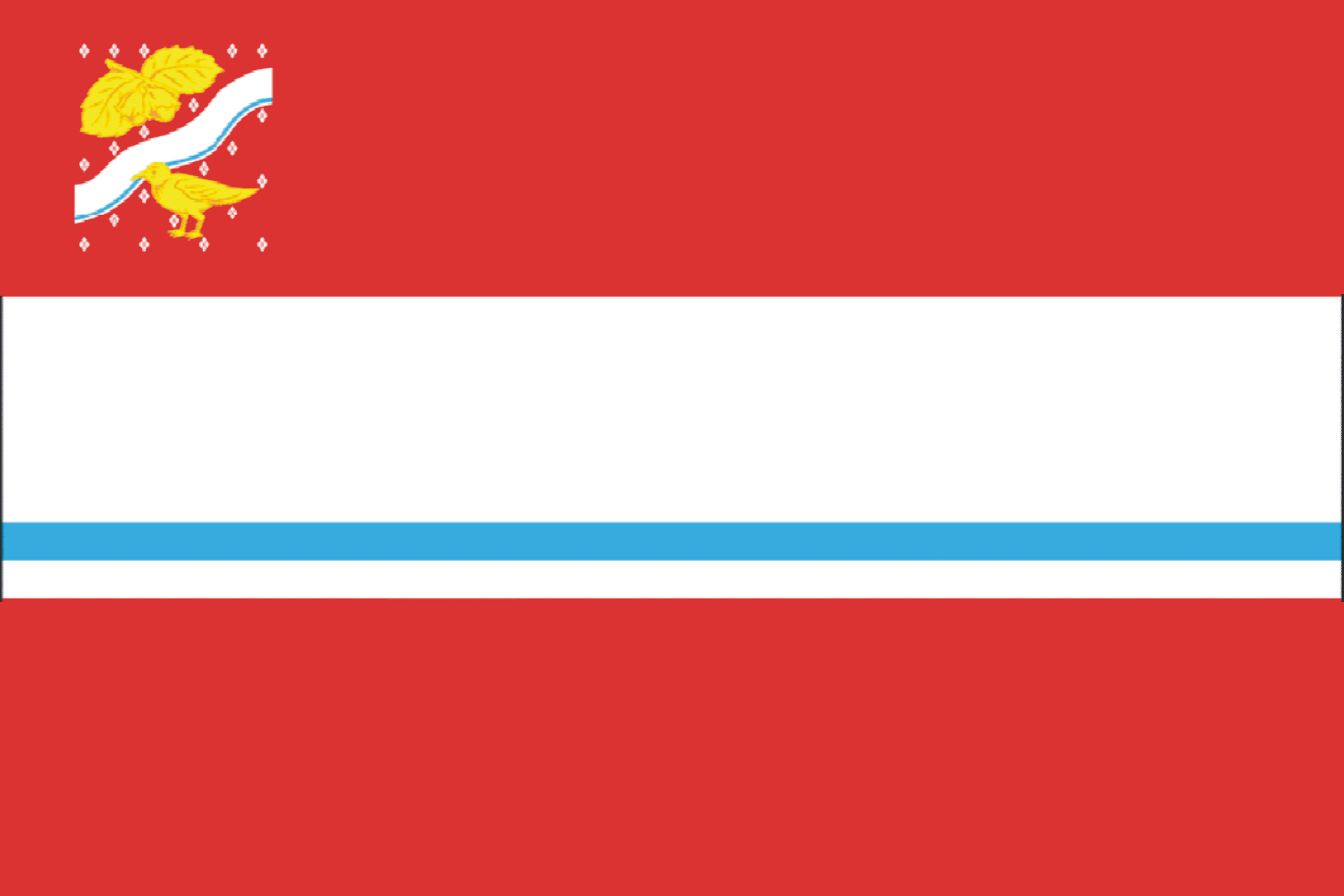
Orekhovo-Zuyevo

Orenburg

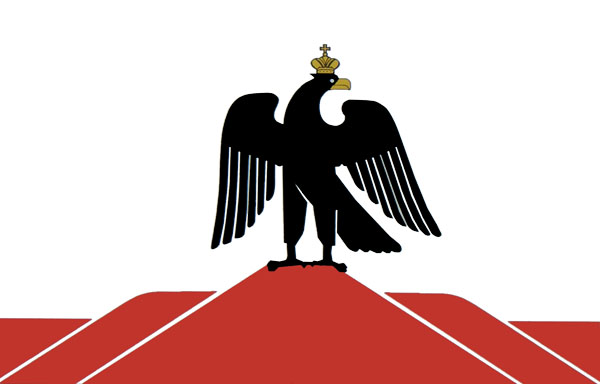
Orsk

Oryol

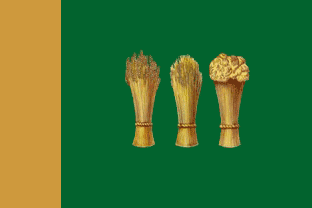
Penza

Perm

Petrozavodsk

Podolsk

Pskov

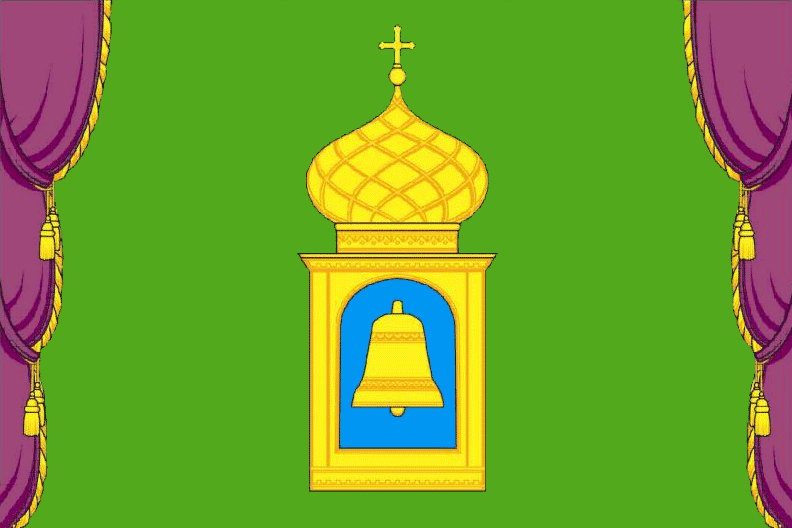
Pushkino

Pyatigorsk

Rostov-on-Don

Ryazan

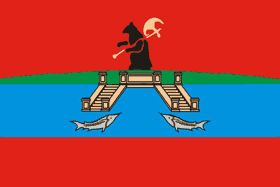
Rybinsk

Saint Petersburg
(details)

Salavat

Samara

Saransk

Sarapul

Saratov

Sergiyev Posad

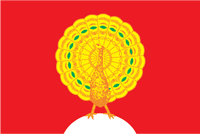
Serpukhov

Severodvinsk

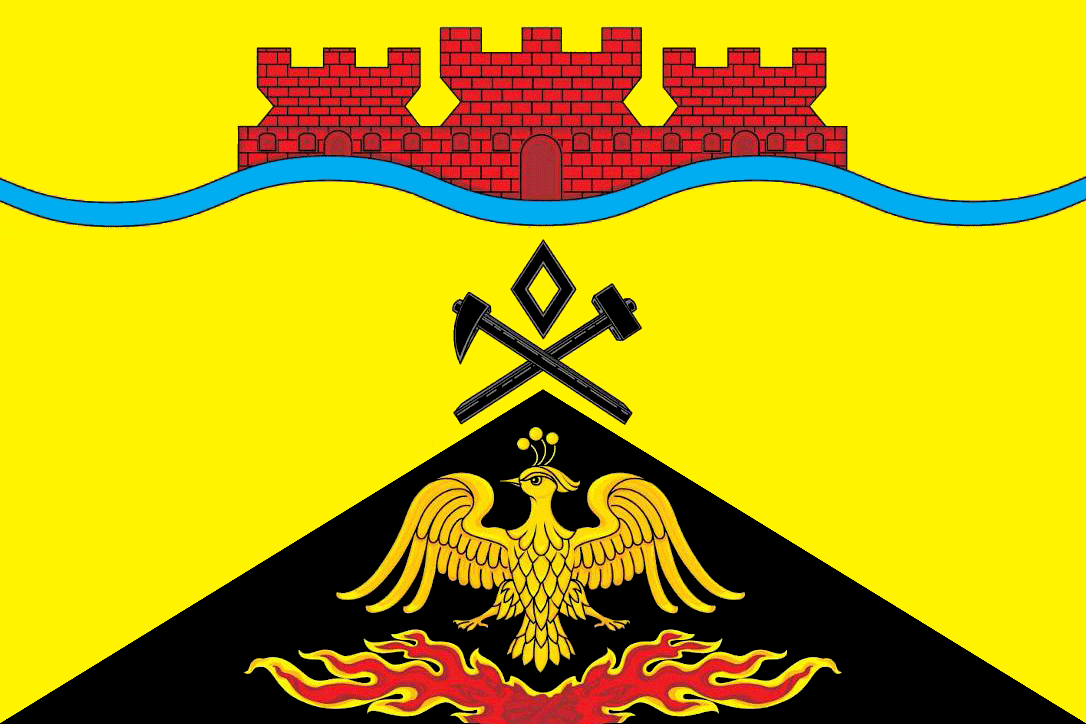
Shakhty

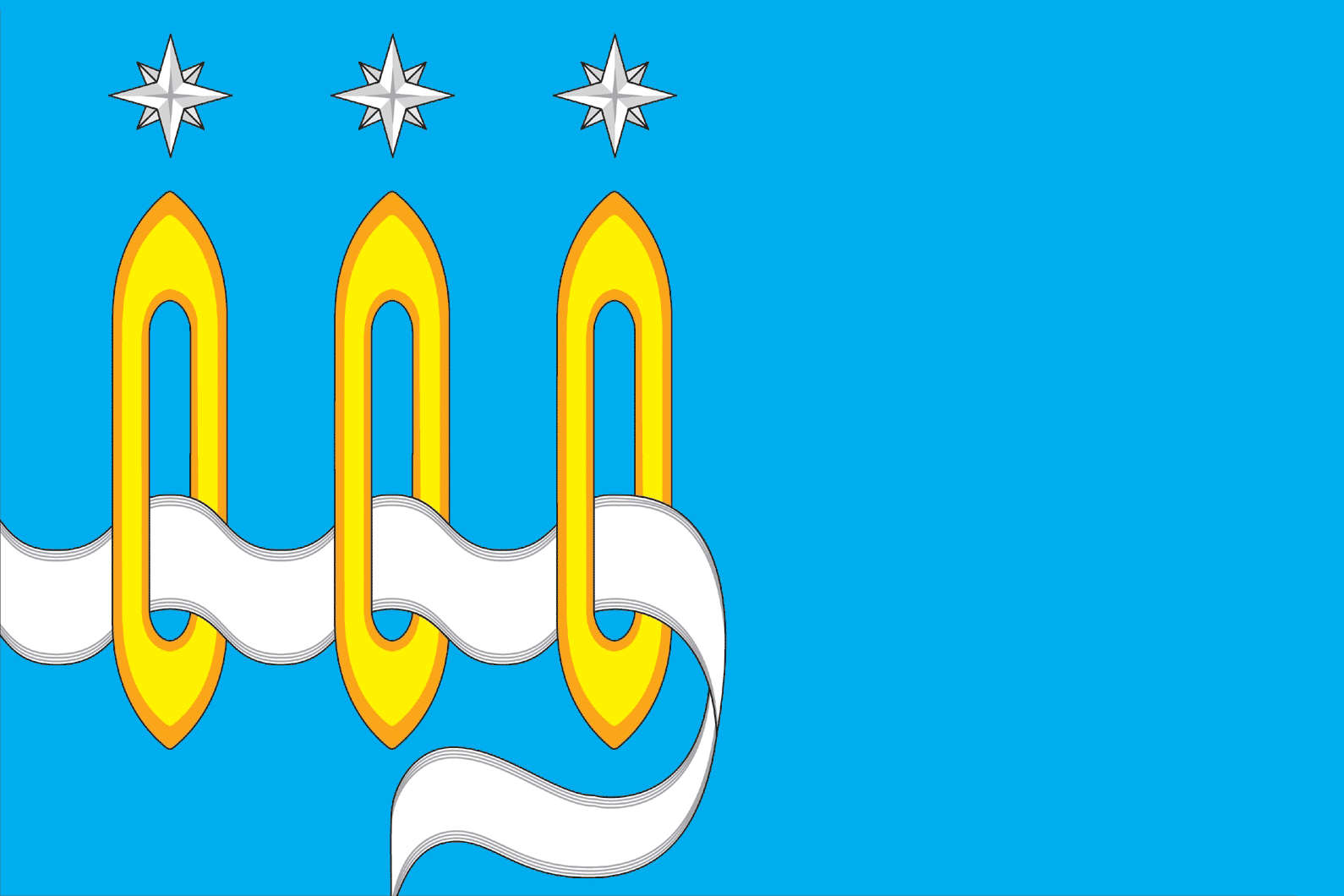
Shchyolkovo

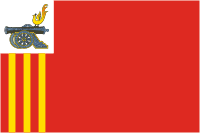
Smolensk

Sochi

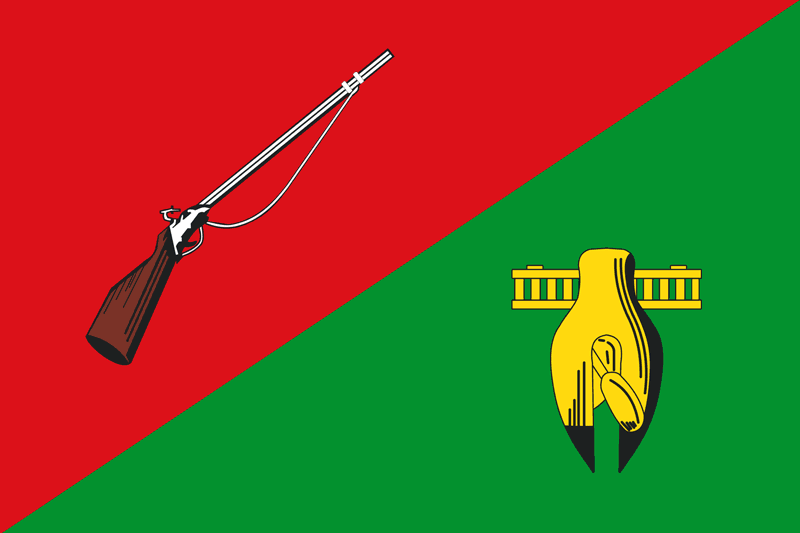
Stary Oskol

Stavropol

Sterlitamak

Syktyvkar

Syzran

Taganrog

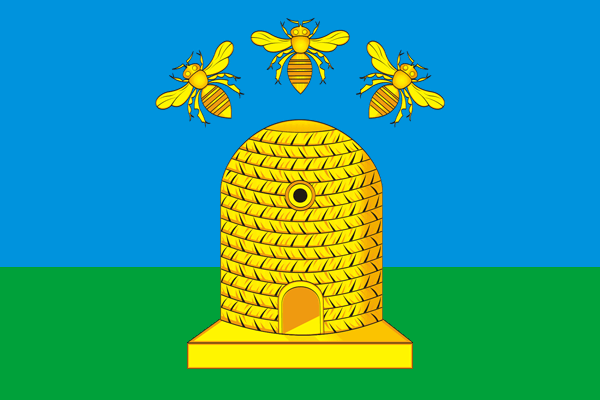
Tambov

Tolyatti

Tula

Tver

Ufa

Ulyanovsk

Veliky Novgorod

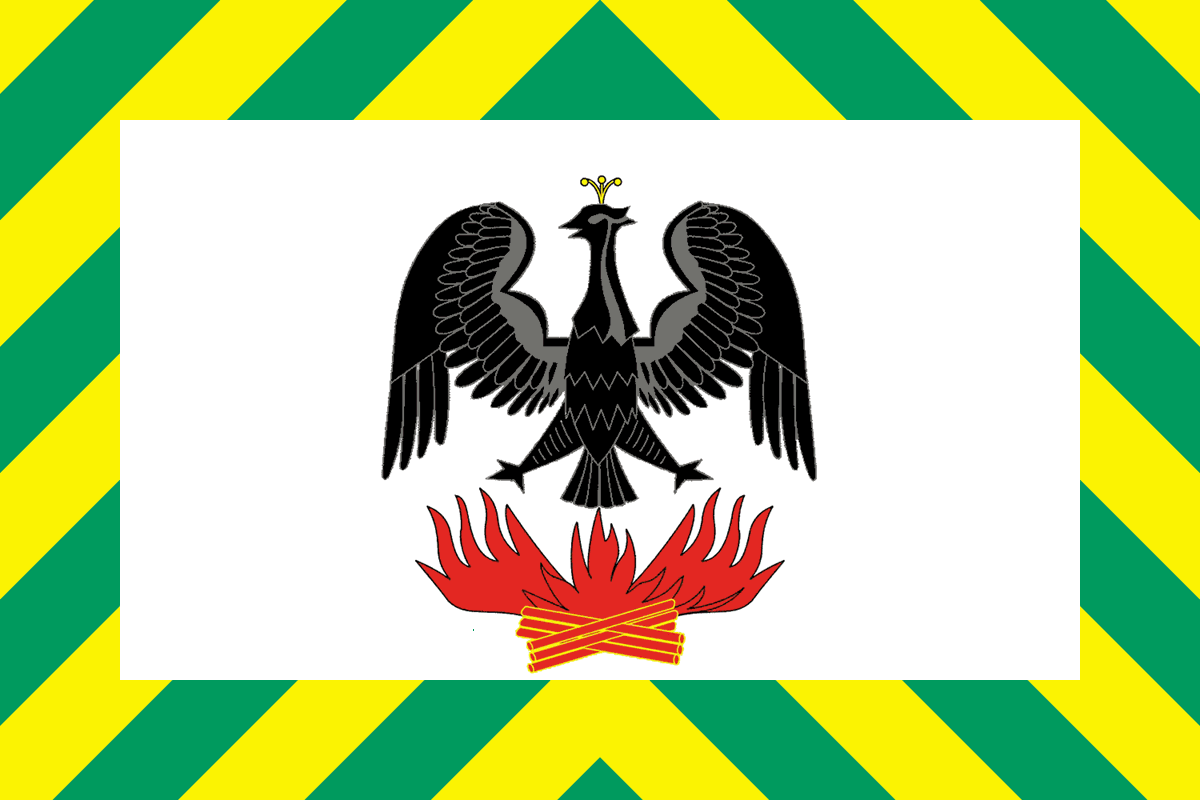
Vidnoye

Vladimir

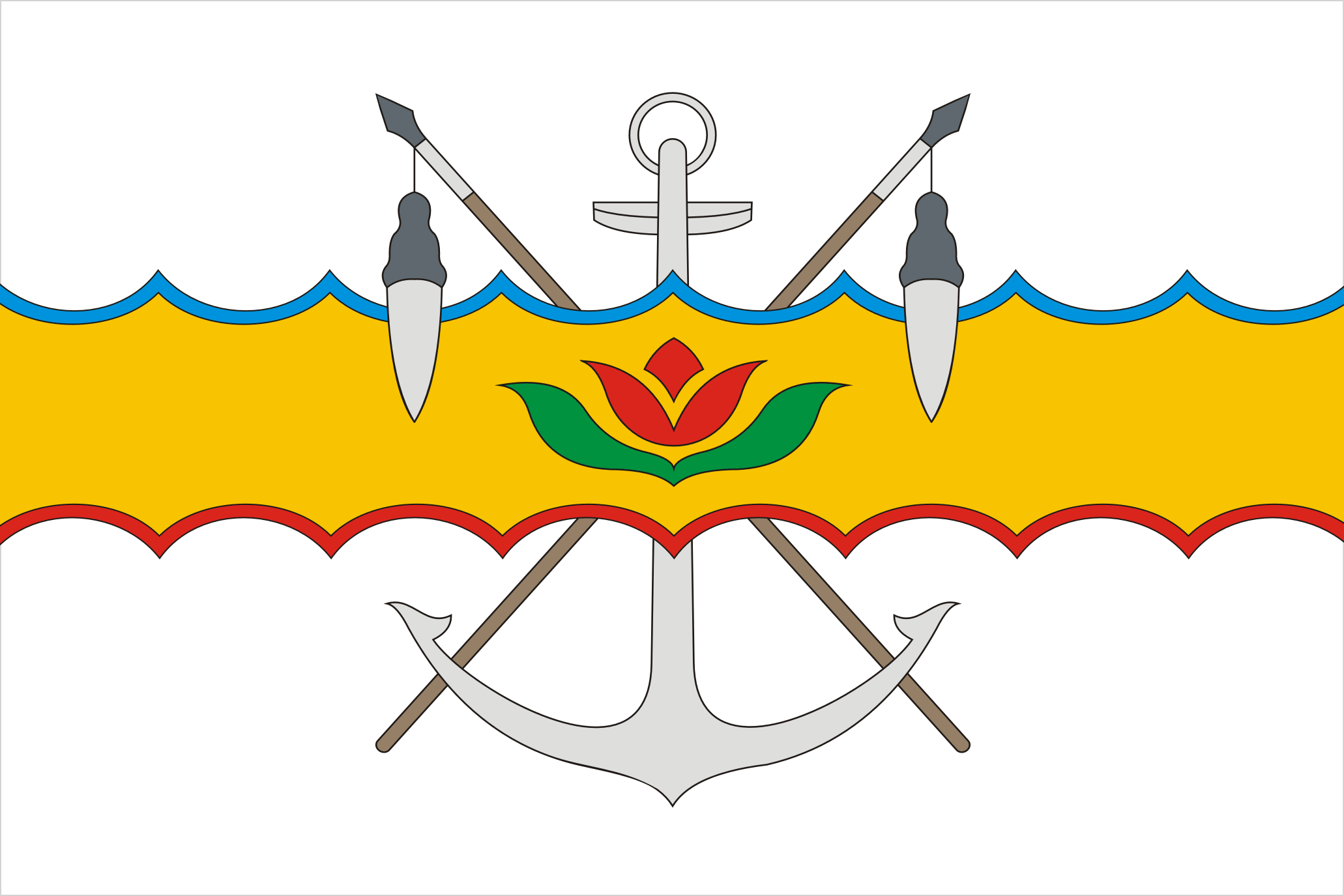
Volgodonsk

Volgograd

Vologda

Volzhsky

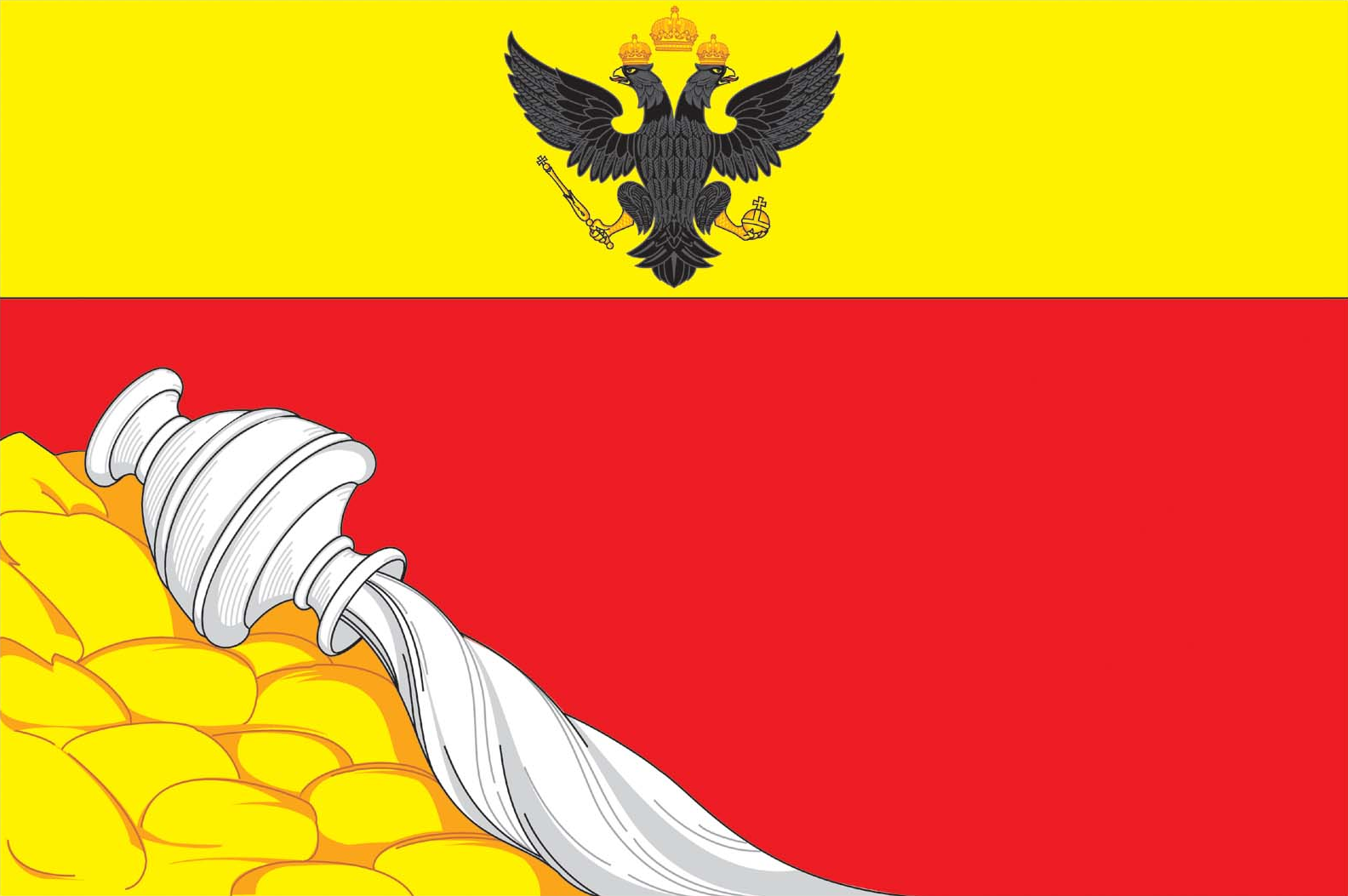
Voronezh

Yaroslavl

Yelets

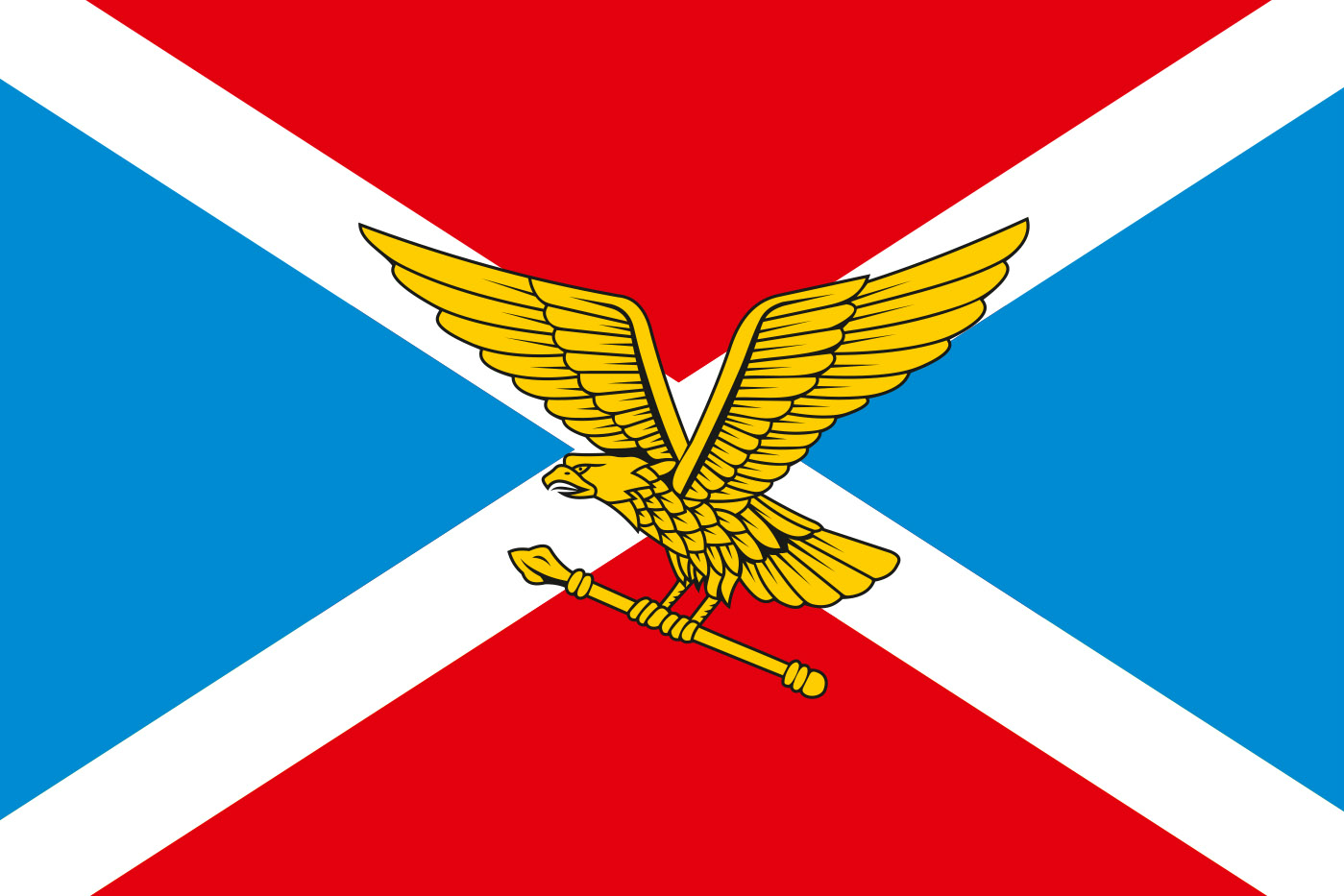
Yessentuki

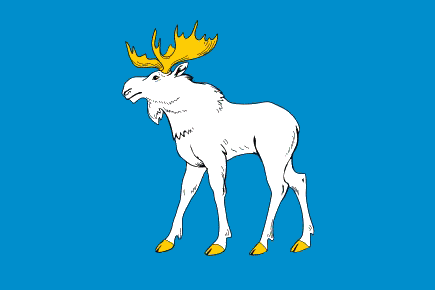
Yoshkar-Ola

Zelenograd

Zheleznodorozhny

Zhukovsky

=== Slovakia ===
Banská Bystrica

Bratislava

Košice

Nitra

Martin

Nové Zámky

Poprad

Považská Bystrica

Prešov

Trnava

Trenčín

Žilina

Zvolen

=== Ukraine ===
Dnipro

Kharkiv

Kryvyi Rih

Kyiv

Lviv

Odesa

Sevastopol

== See also ==
- List of city flags in Africa
- List of city flags in Asia
- List of city flags in North America
- List of city flags in Oceania
- List of city flags in South America
