= Yellow lily =

Yellow lily may refer to:

== Plants ==
- Yellow waterlily, a common name for several plants
- Calochortus luteus, or yellow mariposa lily
- Nuphar advena, or yellow pond-lily
- Hemerocallis lilioasphodelus, or yellow daylily
- Hemerocallis citrina, or long yellow day lily
- Lilium canadense, or wild yellow-lily
- Erythronium grandiflorum, or yellow avalanche lily
- Amorphophallus galbra, or yellow lily yam, a root vegetable

== Other uses ==
- Yellow Lily, a 1928 American silent drama film

== See also ==
- Golden lily (disambiguation)
- Lilium, true lilies
- Zantedeschia, or arum lily
- Taxonomy of Narcissus
