= Fleur-de-lis =

Stylized lily, heraldic symbol

⚜︎o

Fleur-de-lis
- In Unicode: U+269C ⚜︎ FLEUR-DE-LIS; U+269C ⚜️ FLEUR-DE-LIS (with U+FE0F ️ VARIATION SELECTOR-16)

Different from
- Different from: U+2766 ❦ FLORAL HEART

Related
- See also: U+2618 ☘︎ SHAMROCK

Fleur-de-lis

Arms of the Kings of France blazoned Azure, three fleurs-de-lis or

The fleur-de-lis, also spelled fleur-de-lys (plural fleurs-de-lis or fleurs-de-lys), (Note: English: /ˈflɜːr də ˈliː(s)/ FLUR də LEE(SS); French: [flœʁ də lis]. The Oxford English Dictionary gives both pronunciations for English. In French, Larousse and Robert only list [lis]. The TLFI has that pronunciation for the plant itself, but, following Barbeau-Rodhe 1930, [li] for the compound fleur-de-lis.) is a common heraldic charge in the (stylized) shape of a lily (French fleur 'flower' and lis 'lily'). Most notably, the fleur-de-lis is depicted on multiple flags of Quebec and on the traditional coat of arms of France that was used from the High Middle Ages until the French Revolution in 1789, and then again in brief periods in the 19th century. This design still represents France and its royal dynasty in the form of marshalling on the arms of other countries and jurisdictions, including Spain, Quebec and Canada.

Other European nations have also employed the symbol. The fleur-de-lis became "at one and the same time, religious, political, dynastic, artistic, emblematic, and symbolic", especially in French heraldry. The Virgin Mary and Saint Joseph are among saints often depicted with a lily.

Some modern usage of the fleur-de-lis reflects "the continuing presence of heraldry in everyday life", often intentionally, but also when users are not aware that they are "prolonging the life of centuries-old insignia and emblems".

== Etymology ==
Fleur-de-lis is the stylized depiction of the lily flower. The name itself derives from ancient Greek leírion (λείριον) > Latin lilium > French lis.

The lily has always been the symbol of fertility and purity, and in Christianity it symbolizes the Immaculate Conception.

== Origin ==
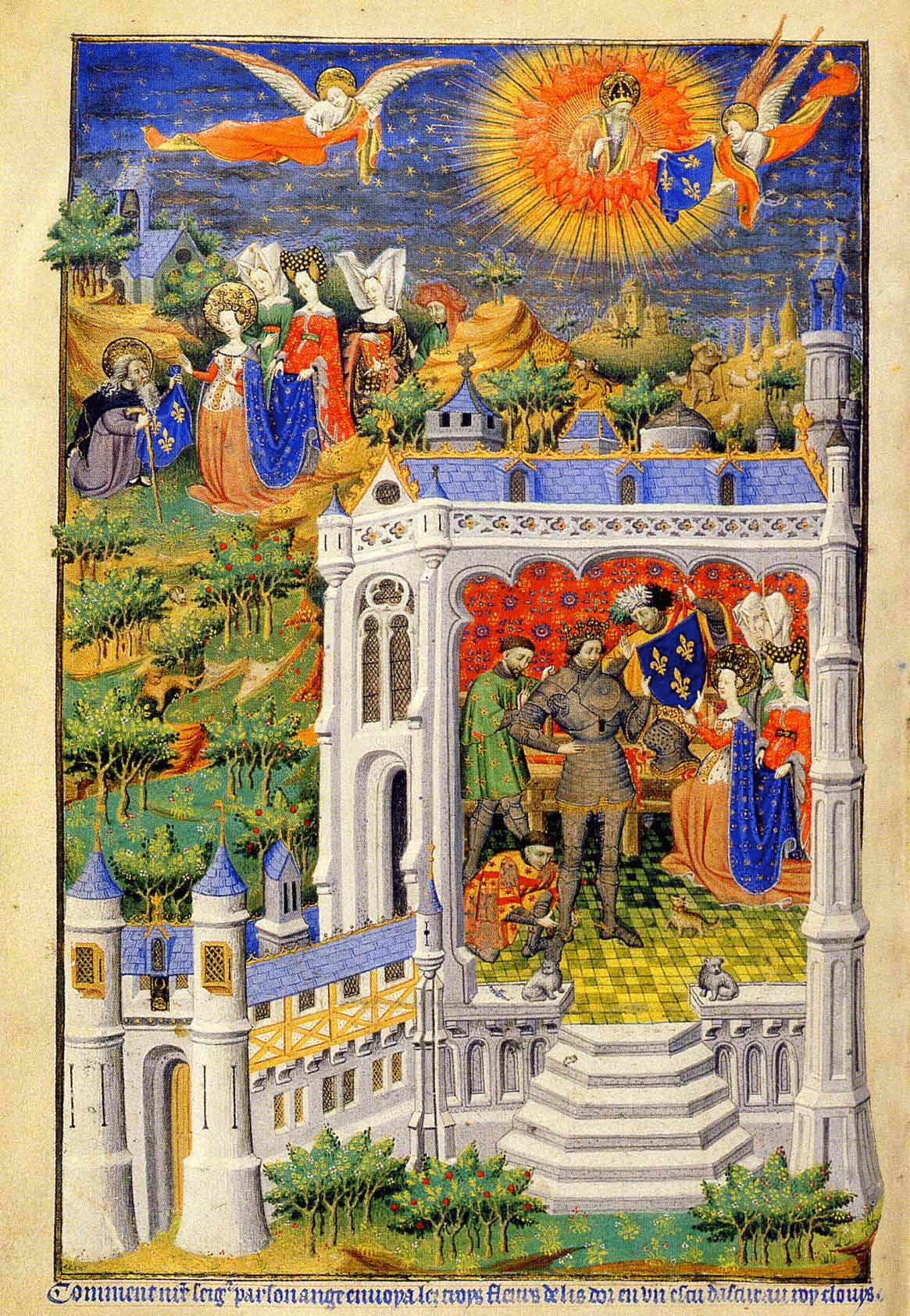
15th-century manuscript depicting an angel sending the fleurs-de-lis to Clovis. From the Bedford Hours in the British Library, London.

According to Pierre-Augustin Boissier de Sauvages, an 18th-century French naturalist and lexicographer:

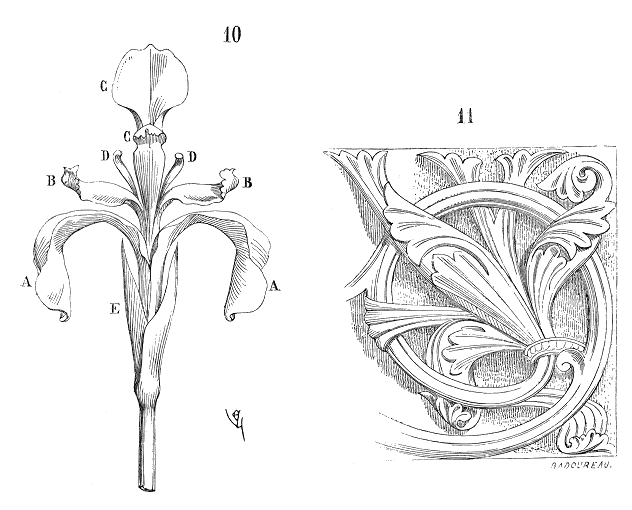
Iris compared with fleur-de-lis ornament

The old fleurs-de-lis, especially the ones found in our first kings' sceptres, have a lot less in common with ordinary lilies than the flowers called flambas [in Occitan], or irises, from which the name of our own fleur-de-lis may derive. What gives some colour of truth to this hypothesis that we already put forth, is the fact that the French or Franks, before entering Gaul itself, lived for a long time around the river named Lys in the Flanders. Nowadays, this river is still bordered with an exceptional number of irises —as many plants grow for centuries in the same places—: these irises have yellow flowers, which is not a typical feature of lilies but fleurs-de-lis. It was thus understandable that our kings, having to choose a symbolic image for what later became a coat of arms, set their minds on the iris, a flower that was common around their homes, and is also as beautiful as it was remarkable. They called it, in short, the fleur-de-lis, instead of the flower of the river of lis. This flower, or iris, looks like our fleur-de-lis not just because of its yellow colour but also because of its shape: of the six petals, or leaves, that it has, three of them are alternatively straight and meet at their tops. The other three on the opposite, bend down so that the middle one seems to make one with the stalk and only the two ones facing out from left and right can clearly be seen, which is again similar with our fleurs-de-lis, that is to say exclusively the one from the river Luts whose white petals bend down too when the flower blooms.

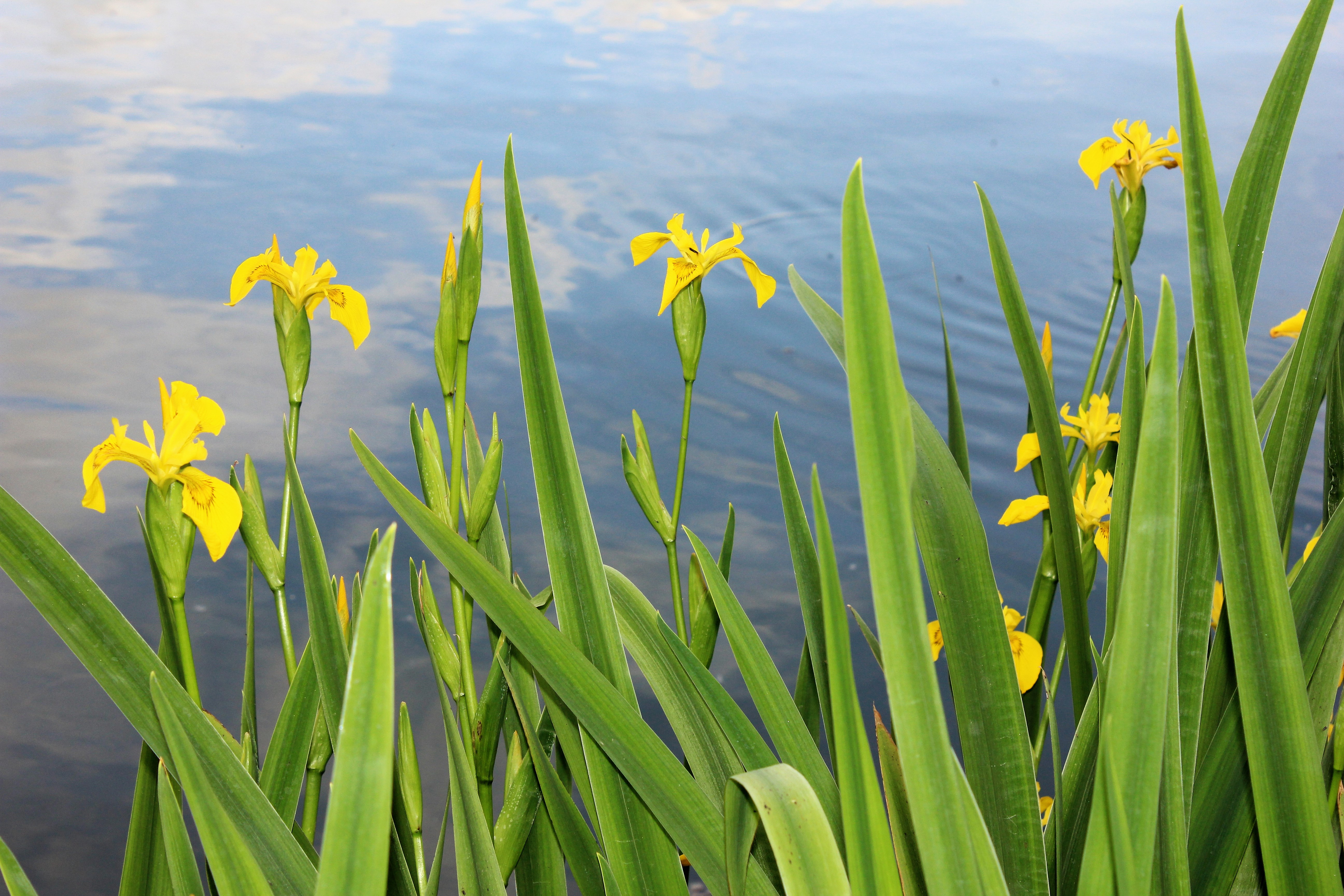
Yellow Iris pseudacorus flowers on a blue field of water

The heraldist François Velde is known to have expressed the same opinion:

However, a hypothesis ventured in the 17th c. sounds very plausible to me. One species of wild iris, the Iris pseudacorus, yellow flag in English, is yellow and grows in marshes (cf. the azure field, for water). Its name in German is Lieschblume (also gelbe Schwertlilie), but Liesch was also spelled Lies and Leys in the Middle Ages. It is easy to imagine that, in Northern France, the Lieschblume would have been called 'fleur-de-lis'. This would explain the name and the formal origin of the design, as a stylized yellow flag. There is a fanciful legend about Clovis which links the yellow flag explicitly with the French coat of arms.

=== Alternative derivations ===
Another (debated) hypothesis is that the symbol derives from the angon or sting, a typical Frankish throwing spear.

=== Ancient usages ===
It has consistently been used as a royal emblem, though different cultures have interpreted its meaning in varying ways. Gaulish coins show the first Western designs which look similar to modern fleurs-de-lis. In the East it was found on the gold helmet of a Scythian king uncovered at the Ak-Burun kurgan and conserved in Saint Petersburg's Hermitage Museum.

See also the very similar lily symbol on coins from the Achemenid and Ptolemaic province of Yehud (c. 350-200 BC) and Hasmonean-ruled Judah (2nd and 1st century BC).

Among the pre-Columbian Maya of Central America, the water lily represented the watery surface of the underworld and the Earth's regenerative power, being depicted as a fleur-de-lis in Maya art. The fleur-de-lis also appears alongside some depictions of the rain god Chaac, the Maya counterpart of the Aztec Tlaloc or Zapotec Cocijo.

== Dynastic and related territorial heraldry ==
For the transition from religious to dynastic symbolism and the beginning of European heraldic use of the fleur-de-lis, see France section, chronologically followed by England through claims to the French crown.

List in alphabetical order by country:

=== Albania ===
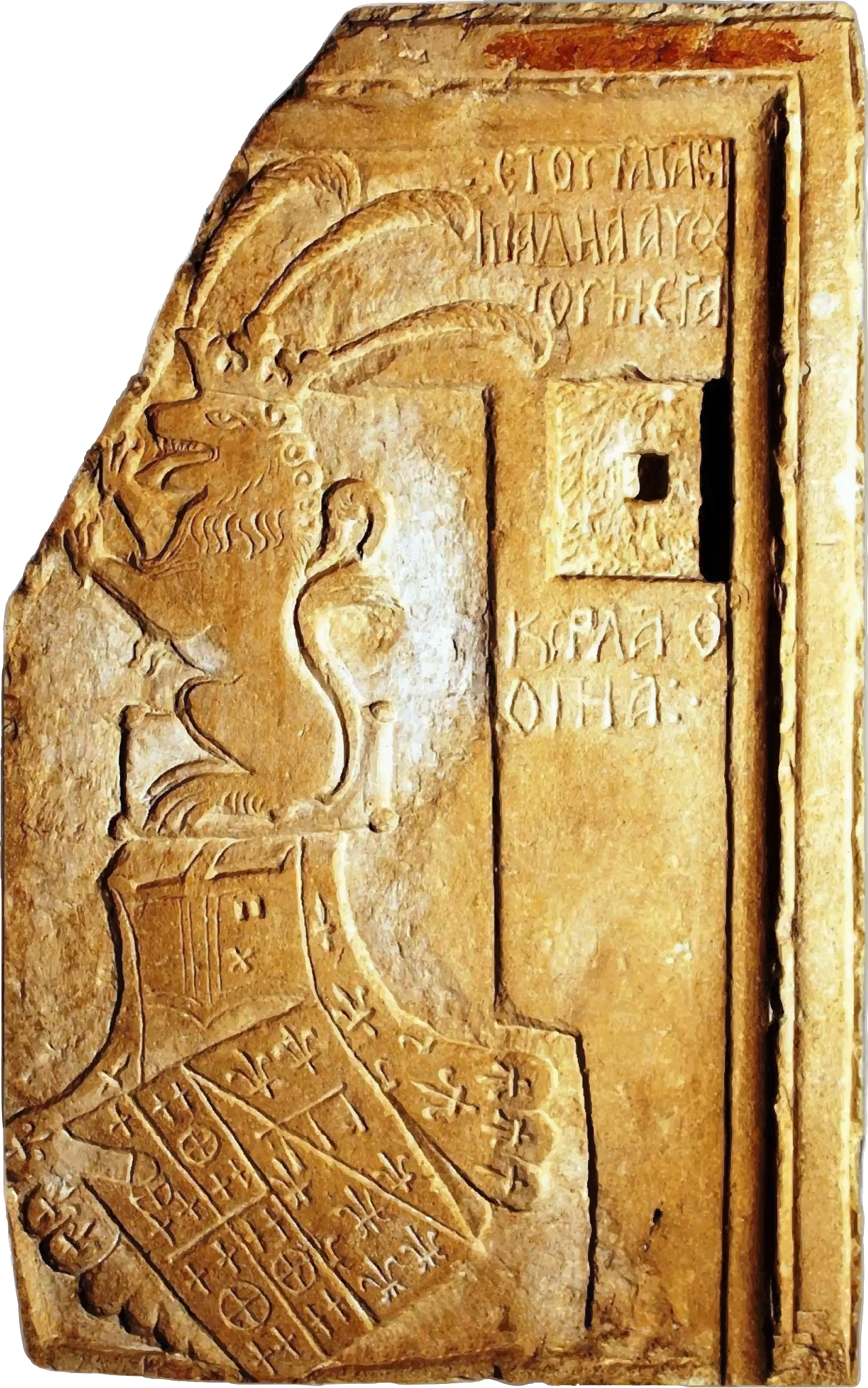
Albanian Prince Karl Thopia stone engraving of his coat of arms. (14th century)

In Albania, fleur-de-lys (Albanian: Lulja e Zambakut) has been associated with the noble house of Topia. After the Ottoman invasion of Albania, the symbol was removed by the Toptani family, a branch of the Topia family.

Coat of arms of the Engjëlli family (16th-Century)

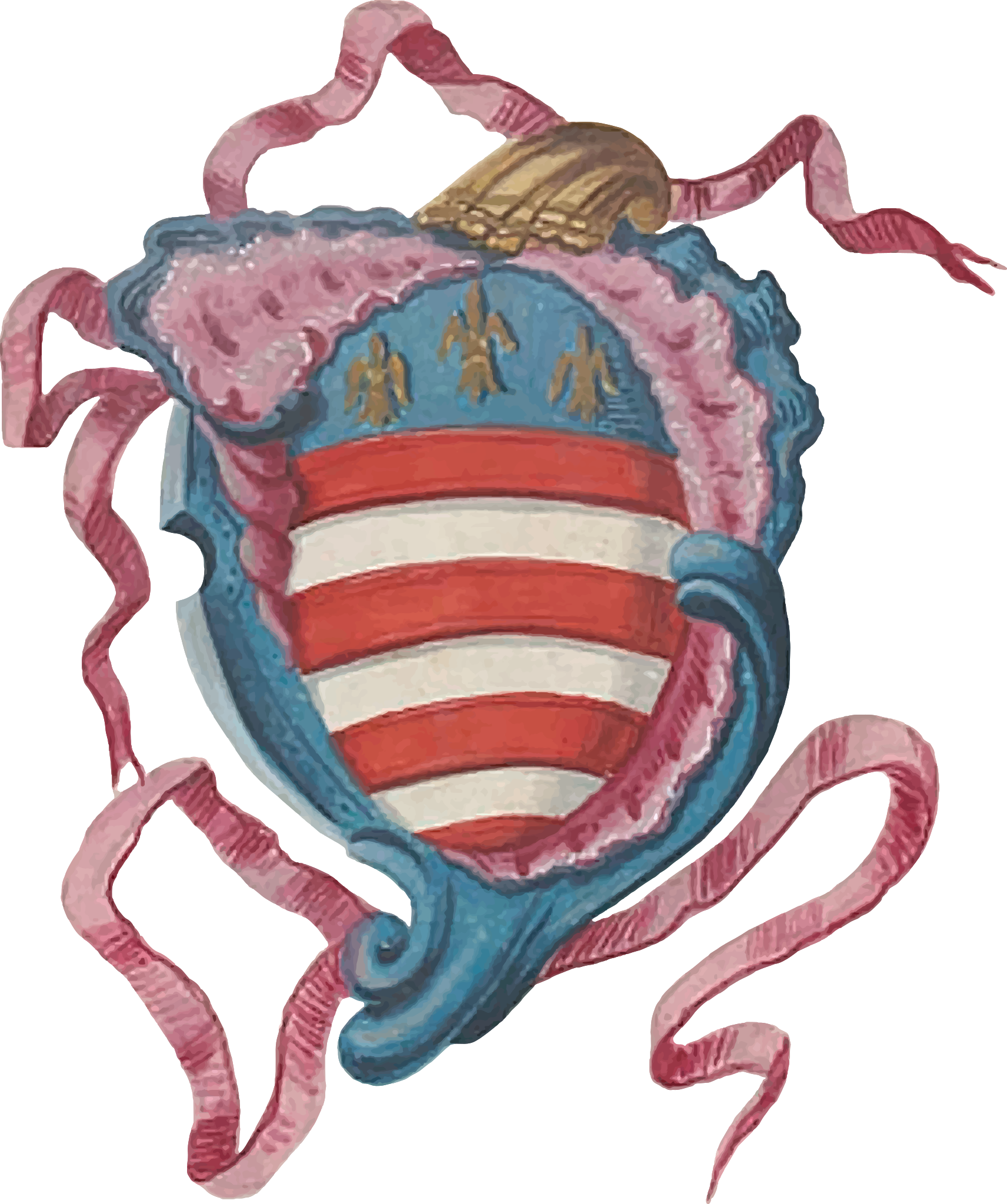
Coat of arms of the Durazzo family (since 1388)

=== Bosnia and Herzegovina ===
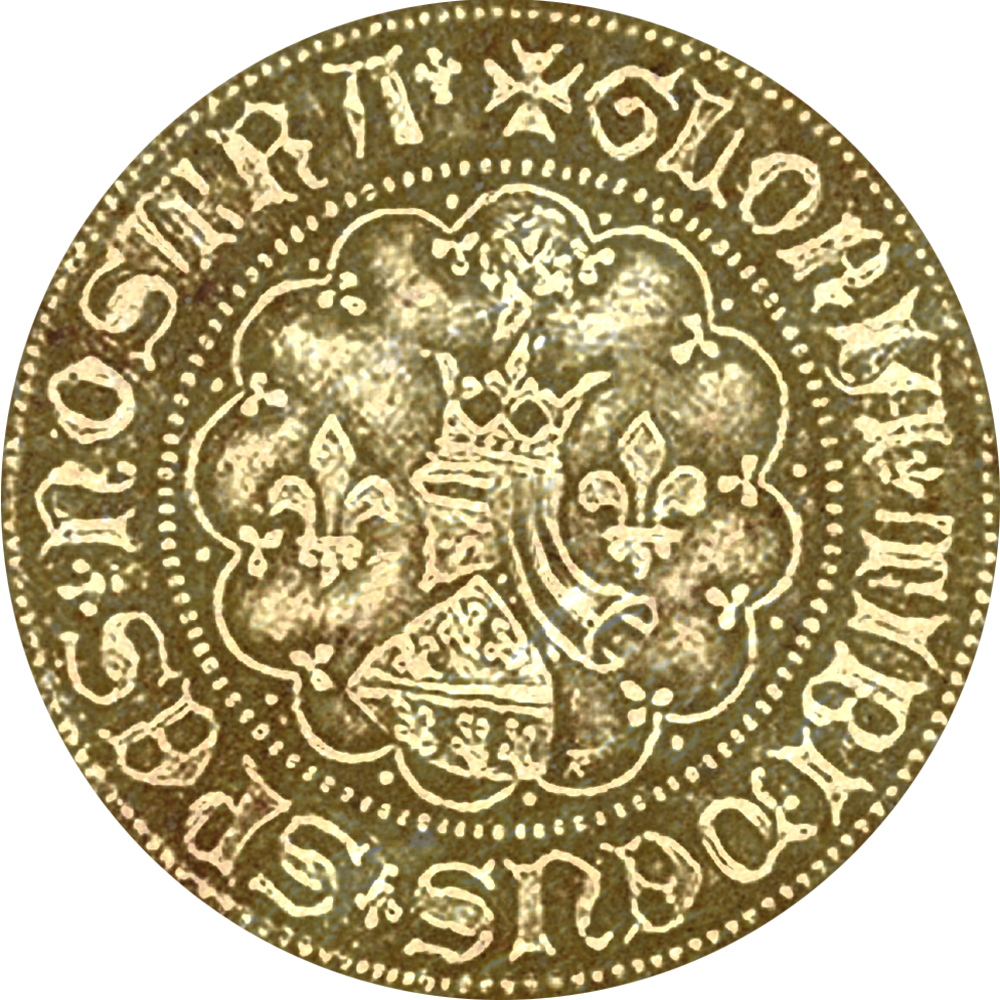
Bosnian king Tvrtko I's gold coin (14th century) reverse – with the Bosnian state fleur-de-lis coat of arms. (GLORIA TIBI DEUS SPES NOSTRA)

The fleurs-de-lis was the symbol of the House of Kotromanić, a ruling house in medieval Bosnia during the medieval Kingdom of Bosnia, adopted by the first Bosnian king, Tvrtko I in recognition of the Capetian House of Anjou support in assuming the throne of Bosnia. The coat of arms contained six fleurs-de-lis,^{[h]} where the flower itself is today interpreted by some to be a representation of the autochthonous golden lily, Lilium bosniacum.

The emblem was revived in 1992 as a national symbol of the Republic of Bosnia and Herzegovina and was part of the flag of Bosnia-Herzegovina from 1992 to 1998. The state insignia were changed in 1999. The former flag of the Federation of Bosnia and Herzegovina contains a fleur-de-lis alongside the Croatian chequy. Fleurs also appear in the flags and arms of many cantons, municipalities, cities and towns. Today, it is a traditional symbol of the Bosniak people. It is still used as official insignia of the Bosniak Regiment of the Armed Forces of Bosnia and Herzegovina.

Fleurs-de-lis today also appear in the flags and arms of many cantons, municipalities, cities and towns of Bosnia and Herzegovina.

Coat of arms of the Kingdom of Bosnia (1377–1463)

Coat of arms of the Republic of Bosnia and Herzegovina used 1992–1998, derived from the coa of Bosnian King Tvrtko I Kotromanić

=== Canada ===
The Royal Banner of France or "Bourbon flag" symbolizing royal France, was the most commonly used flag in New France. The "Bourbon flag" has three gold fleurs-de-lys on a dark blue field arranged two and one. The fleur-de-lys was also seen on New France's currency often referred to as "card money". The white Royal Banner of France was used by the military of New France and was seen on naval vessels and forts of New France. After the fall of New France to the British Empire the fleur-de-lys remained visible on churches and remained part of French cultural symbolism. There are many French-speaking Canadians for whom the fleur-de-lys remains a symbol of their French cultural identity. Québécois, Franco-Ontarians, Franco-Ténois and Franco-Albertans, feature the fleur-de-lys prominently on their flags.

The fleur-de-lys, as a traditional royal symbol in Canada — the "lys" spelling is preferred in Canadian English — has been incorporated into many national symbols, provincial symbols and municipal symbols. The Canadian Red Ensign that served as the nautical flag and civil ensign for Canada from 1892 to 1965, and later as an informal flag of Canada before 1965, featured the traditional number of three golden fleurs-de-lys on a blue background. The arms of Canada throughout its variations has used fleur-de-lys, beginning in 1921 and subsequent various has featuring the blue "Bourbon Flag" in two locations within arms. The Canadian royal cypher and the arms of Canada feature St Edward's Crown that displays four crosses pattée and four fleurs-de-lys. The fleur-de-lys is featured on the flag of Quebec, known as the Fleurdelisé, as well as the flags of the cities of Montreal, Sherbrooke and Trois-Rivières.

The Coat of arms of Canada

The Quebec version of the fleur-de-lys

=== France ===
==== Royal symbol: background, later legends ====
The fleur-de-lis symbolic origins with French monarchs may stem from the baptismal lily used in the crowning of King Clovis I (r. c. 481–509). The French monarchy may have adopted the fleur-de-lis for its royal coat of arms as a symbol of purity to commemorate the conversion of Clovis I, and a reminder of the fleur-de-lis ampulla that held the oil used to anoint the king. So, the fleur-de-lis stood as a symbol of the king's divinely approved right to rule. The thus "anointed" kings of France later maintained that their authority was directly from God. A legend enhances the mystique of royalty by informing us that a vial of oil—the Holy Ampulla—descended from Heaven to anoint and sanctify Clovis as King, descending directly on Clovis or perhaps brought by a dove to Saint Remigius. One version explains that an angel descended with the fleur-de-lis ampulla to anoint the king. Another story tells of Clovis putting a flower in his helmet just before his victory at the Battle of Vouillé. Through this propagandist connection to Clovis, the fleur-de-lis has been taken in retrospect to symbolize all the Christian Frankish kings, most notably Charlemagne.

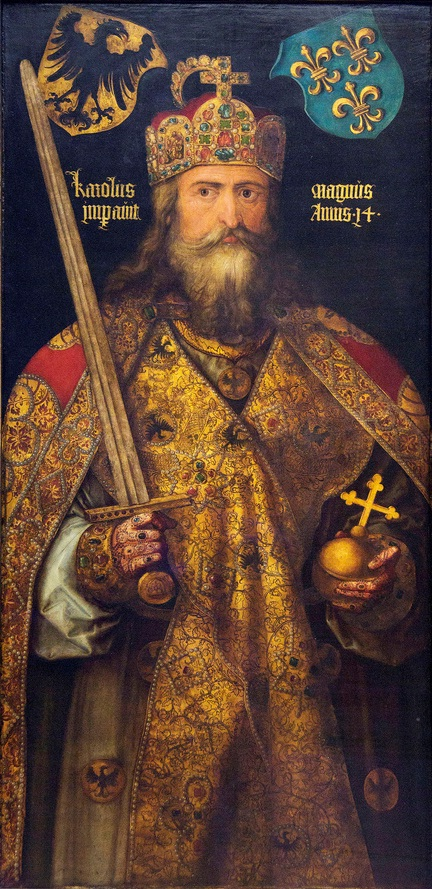
Charlemagne, by Albrecht Dürer. The anachronistic coats-of-arms above him show the eagle and the French fleur-de-lis

The graphic evolution of crita to fleur-de-lis was accompanied by textual allegory. By the late 13th century, an allegorical poem by Guillaume de Nangis (d. 1300), written at Joyenval Abbey in Chambourcy, relates how the golden lilies on an azure ground were miraculously substituted for the crescents on Clovis' shield, a projection into the past of contemporary images of heraldry.

In the 14th century, French writers asserted that the monarchy of France, which developed from the Kingdom of the West Franks, could trace its heritage back to the divine gift of royal arms received by Clovis. This story has remained popular, even though modern scholarship has established that the fleur-de-lis was a religious symbol before it was a true heraldic symbol. Along with true lilies, it was associated with the Virgin Mary, and when the 12th-century Capetians, Louis VI and Louis VII, started to use the emblem, their purpose was of connecting their rulership with this symbol of saintliness and divine right.

==== First royal symbol; France Ancient ====
Louis VI (r. 1108–1137) and Louis VII (r. 1137–1180) of the House of Capet first started to use the emblem, on sceptres for example. Louis VII ordered the use of fleur-de-lis clothing in his son Philip's coronation in 1179, while the first visual evidence of clearly heraldic use dates from 1211: a seal showing the future Louis VIII and his shield strewn with the "flowers".

Until the late 14th century the French royal coat of arms was Azure semé-de-lis Or (a blue shield "sown" (semé) with a scattering of small golden fleurs-de-lis), the so-called France Ancient, but Charles V of France changed the design to a group of three in about 1376 (see next section for France Modern).

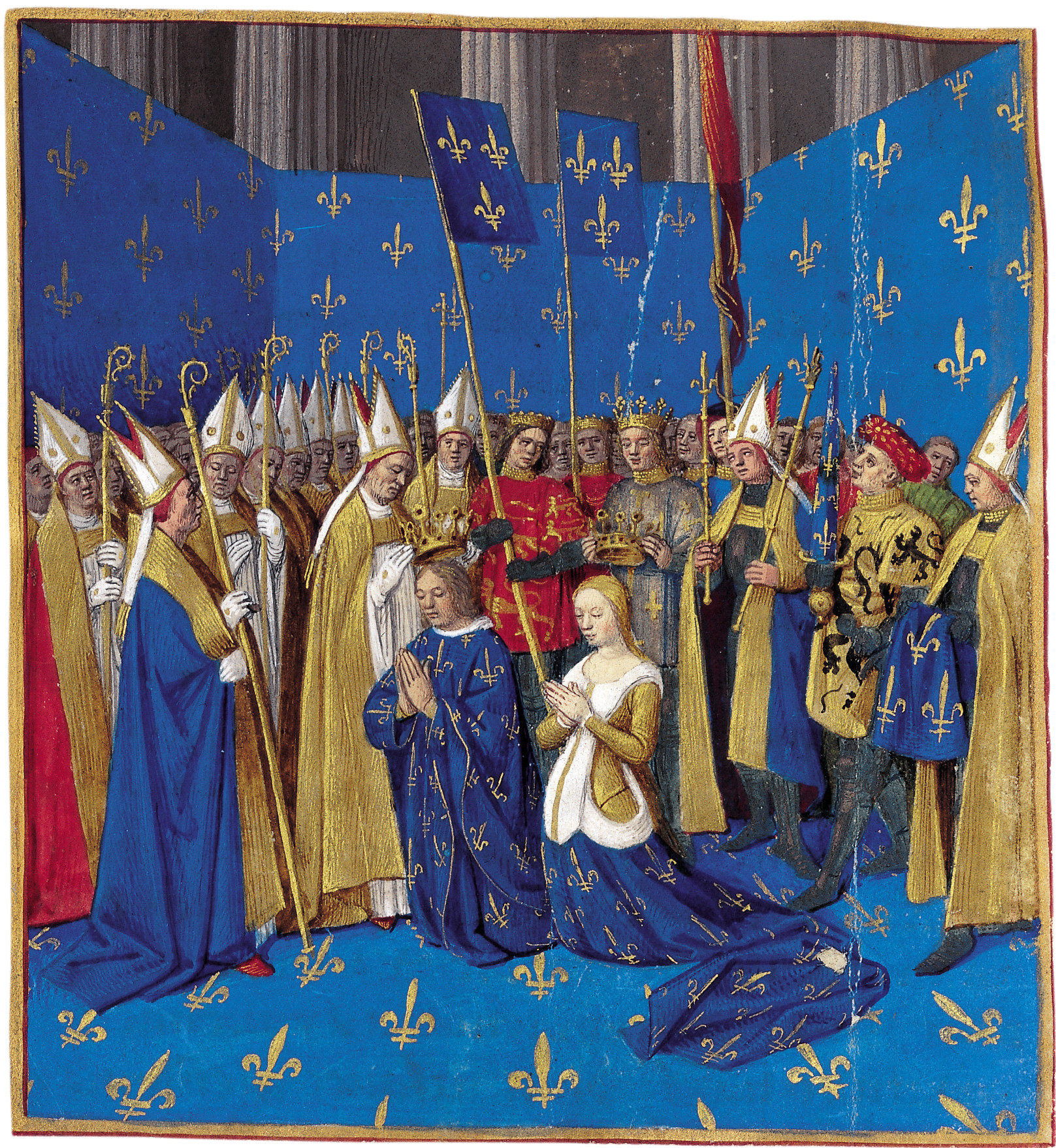
Coronation of Louis VIII and Blanche of Castile at Reims in 1223

In the reign of King Louis IX (St. Louis) the three petals of the flower were said to represent faith, wisdom and chivalry, and to be a sign of divine favour bestowed on France. During the next century, the 14th, the tradition of Trinity symbolism was established in France, and then spread elsewhere.

==== English claims ====
In 1328, King Edward III of England inherited a claim to the crown of France, and in about 1340 he quartered France Ancient with the arms of Plantagenet, as "arms of pretence". ^{[c]} After the kings of France adopted France Modern, the kings of England adopted the new design as quarterings from about 1411. The monarchs of England (and later of Great Britain) continued to quarter the French arms until 1801, when George III abandoned his formal claim to the French throne.

On 29 December 1429, King Charles VII ennobled the family of Joan of Arc, seen as a French hero in the ensueing Hundred Years' War, with an inheritable symbolic denomination. The Chamber of Accounts in France registered the family's designation to nobility on 20 January 1430. The grant permitted the family to change their surname to du Lys.

==== France Moderne (1376–1790s, etc.) ====
In about 1376, Charles V changed the design from the all-over scattering of flowers to a group of three,^{[a]}^{[b]} thus replacing what is known in heraldic terminology as the France Ancient, with the France Modern.

France moderne remained the French royal standard, and with a white background was the French national flag until the French Revolution, when it was replaced by the tricolor of modern-day France. The fleur-de-lis was restored to the French flag in 1814, but replaced once again after the July Revolution against Charles X in 1830.^{[d]}

After the end of the Second French Empire, Henri, comte de Chambord, was offered the throne as King of France, but he agreed only if France gave up the tricolor and brought back the white flag with fleurs-de-lis. Curiously the French tricolore with the royal crown and fleur-de-lys was possibly designed by the count in his younger years as a compromise. His condition that his country needed to abandon the red and blue colors that it had adopted to symbolize the ideals of the French Revolution of 1789 was rejected and France became a republic.

==== Current use ====
It remains an enduring symbol of France which appears on French postage stamps, although it has never been adopted officially by any of the French republics, that unlike other republican nations, never officially adopted a coat of arms.

Although the origin of the fleur-de-lis is unclear, it has retained an association with French nobility and associated cities and regions. It is widely used in French city emblems as in the coat of arms of the city of Lille, Saint-Denis, Brest, Clermont-Ferrand, Boulogne-Billancourt, and Calais. Some cities that had been particularly faithful to the French Crown were awarded a heraldic augmentation of two or three fleurs-de-lis on the chief of their coat of arms; such cities include Paris, Lyon, Toulouse, Bordeaux, Reims, Le Havre, Angers, Le Mans, Aix-en-Provence, Tours, Limoges, Amiens, Orléans, Rouen, Argenteuil, Poitiers, Chartres, and Laon, among others. The fleur-de-lis was the symbol of Île-de-France, the core of the French kingdom. It has appeared on the coat-of-arms of other historical provinces of France including Burgundy, Anjou, Picardy, Berry, Orléanais, Bourbonnais, Maine, Touraine, Artois, Dauphiné, Saintonge, and the County of La Marche. Many of the current French departments use the symbol on their coats-of-arms to express this heritage.

The fleur-de-lis appears for instance on the coat-of-arms of Guadeloupe, an overseas département of France in the Caribbean, Saint Barthélemy, an overseas collectivity of France, and French Guiana. The overseas department of Réunion in the Indian Ocean uses the same feature. It appears on the coat of Port Louis, the capital of Mauritius which was named in honour of King Louis XV. On the coat of arms of Saint Lucia it represents the French heritage of the country.

Coat of arms of Paris

The arms of Bourgogne-Franche-Comté

While the fleur-de-lis has appeared on countless European coats of arms and flags over the centuries, it is particularly associated with the French monarchy in a historical context and continues to appear in the arms of members of the Spanish branch of the French House of Bourbon, including the king of Spain and the grand duke of Luxembourg.

==== Duby's interpretation ====
According to French historian Georges Duby, the three petals represent the three medieval social estates: the commoners, the nobility, and the clergy.

=== Italy and the pope ===
In Italy, the fleur de lis - called giglio bottonato (it) - is mainly known from the crest of the city of Florence. In the Florentine fleurs-de-lis ^{[f]} the stamens are always posed between the petals. Originally argent (silver or white) on gules (red) background, the emblem became the standard of the imperial party in Florence (parte ghibellina), causing the town government, which maintained a staunch Guelph stance, being strongly opposed to the imperial pretensions on city states, to reverse the color pattern to the final gules lily on argent background. This heraldic charge is often known as the Florentine lily to distinguish it from the conventional (stamen-not-shown) design. As an emblem of the city, it is therefore found in icons of Zenobius, its first bishop, and associated with Florence's patron Saint John the Baptist in the Florentine fiorino.

Coat of arms of the Italian city of Florence

Flag of the Duchy of Parma (1545–1731)

=== Lithuania ===
The design of the arms of Jurbarkas is believed to originate from the arms of the Sapieha house, a Lithuanian noble family which was responsible for Jurbarkas receiving city rights and a coat of arms in 1611.

The three fleurs-de-lis design on the Jurbarkas coat of arms was abolished during the final years of the Polish–Lithuanian Commonwealth, but officially restored in 1993 after the independence of present-day Lithuania was re-established. Before restoration, several variant designs, such as using one over two fleurs-de-lis, had been restored and abolished. The original two over one version was briefly readopted in 1970 during the Soviet occupation, but abolished that same year.

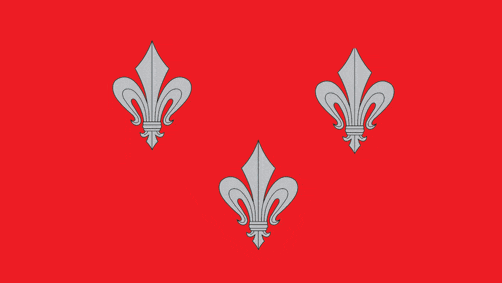
Flag of Jurbarkas

Coat of arms of Jurbarkas

=== Malta, Order of Malta ===
Coat of arms of St. Venera local council, Malta

Three fleurs-de-lis appeared in the personal coat of arms of Grandmaster Alof de Wignacourt who ruled the Malta between 1601 and 1622. His nephew Adrien de Wignacourt, who was Grandmaster himself from 1690 to 1697, also had a similar coat of arms with three fleurs-de-lis.

The town of Santa Venera has three red fleurs-de-lis on its flag and coat of arms. These are derived from an arch which was part of the Wignacourt Aqueduct that had three sculpted fleurs-de-lis on top, as they were the heraldic symbols of Alof de Wignacourt, the Grand Master who financed its building. Another suburb which developed around the area became known as Fleur-de-Lys, and it also features a red fleur-de-lis on its flag and coat of arms.

=== Serbia ===
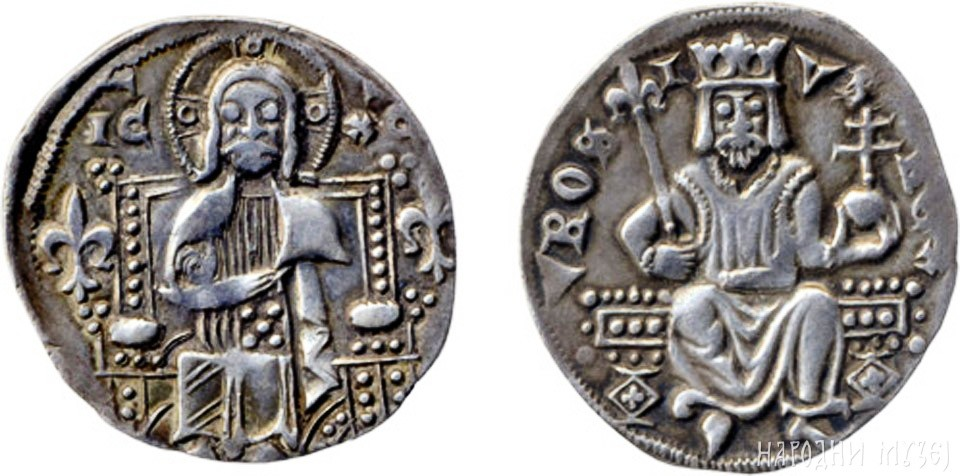
13th-century Serbian currency in medieval Kingdom of Serbia at the time of King Stefan Milutin Nemanjić, with the state's fleur-de-lis coat of arms, Jesus Christ and the king

The fleur-de-lis was the symbol of the House of Nemanjić (12th century), a ruling Serbian Orthodox house in medieval Serbia during the medieval Grand Principality of Serbia, Kingdom of Serbia and Serbian Empire, adopted by the Serbian king, Stefan Nemanjić. The coat of arms contained two fleurs-de-lis. Today, the fleur-de-lis is, alongside the Serbian Cross, Serbian eagle and Serbian Flag, national symbols of the Serb people.

Fleurs also appear in the flags and arms of many municipalities like Šabac, Valjevo, Tutin, Prijepolje, Despotovac, Lebane and Čoka.

Coat of arms of the Kingdom of Serbia (1217–1346)

Coat of arms of Serbia (since 2004)

Coat of arms of Serbia (from 1882)

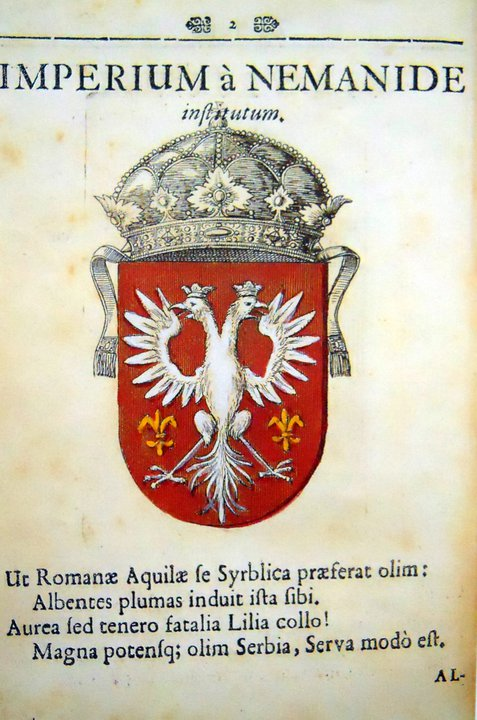
Serbian Empire (1300s), rendered in 1701

=== United Kingdom ===
Fleurs-de-lis feature prominently in the Crown Jewels of England and Scotland. In English heraldry, they are used in many different ways, and can be the cadency mark of the sixth son. Additionally, it features in a large number of royal arms of the House of Plantagenet, from the 13th century onwards to the early Tudors (Elizabeth of York and the de la Pole family).

The tressure flory–counterflory (flowered border) has been a prominent part of the design of the Scottish royal arms and Royal Standard since James I of Scotland.^{[e]}

The treasured fleur-de-luce he claims
To wreathe his shield, since royal James
—Sir Walter Scott, The Lay of the Last Minstrel

In the United Kingdom, a fleur-de-lis has appeared in the official arms of the Norroy King of Arms for hundreds of years. A silver fleur-de-lis on a blue background is the arms of the Barons Digby.

In English and Canadian heraldry the fleur-de-lis is the cadence mark of a sixth son.

A fleur-de-lis can also be seen on the flag of Monmouthshire, Wales: Per pale azure and sable three fleurs-de-lys or.

It can also be found on the arms of the Scottish clan chiefs of both Carruthers; gules two engrailed chevrons between three fleur-d-lis or and the brouns/browns: gules a chevron between three fleur d-lis or.

Coat of arms of the Norroy and Ulster King of Arms

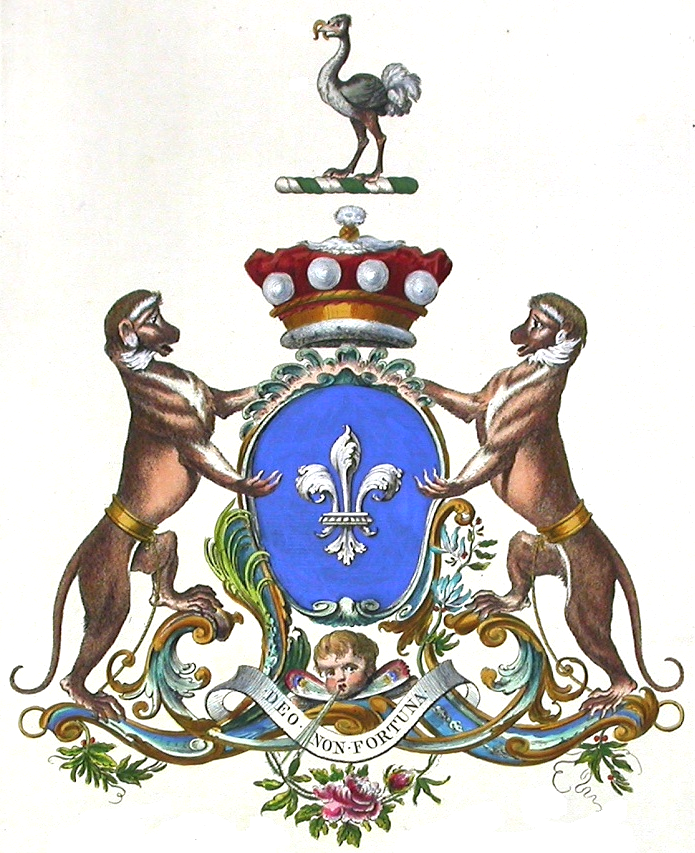
Coat of arms of the Barons of Digby

=== United States ===
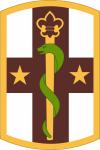
The fleur-de-lis is used in the insignia of the 176th Medical Brigade as a tribute to the unit's service in France.

In the US, the fleur-de-lis symbols tend to be along or near the Mississippi and Missouri rivers. These are areas of strong French colonial empire settlement. It appears on the flag or seal of the cities of Baton Rouge, Detroit, Lafayette, Louisville, Mobile, New Orleans, Ocean Springs and St. Louis. On 9 July 2008, Louisiana governor Bobby Jindal signed a bill into law making the fleur-de-lis an official symbol of the state. Following Hurricane Katrina on 29 August 2005, the fleur-de-lis has been widely used in New Orleans and throughout Louisiana, as a symbol of grassroots support for New Orleans' recovery. The coat of arms of St. Augustine, Florida has a fleur-de-lis on the first quarter, due to its connection with Huguenots. Several counties have flags and seals based on pre-1801 British royal arms also includes fleur-de-lis symbols. They are King George County, Virginia and Prince George's County, Somerset County, Kent County, and Montgomery County in Maryland. It has also become the symbol for the identity of the Cajuns and Louisiana Creole people, and their French heritage.

Flag of the Louisiana Creole people

Flag of New Orleans

== Military ==
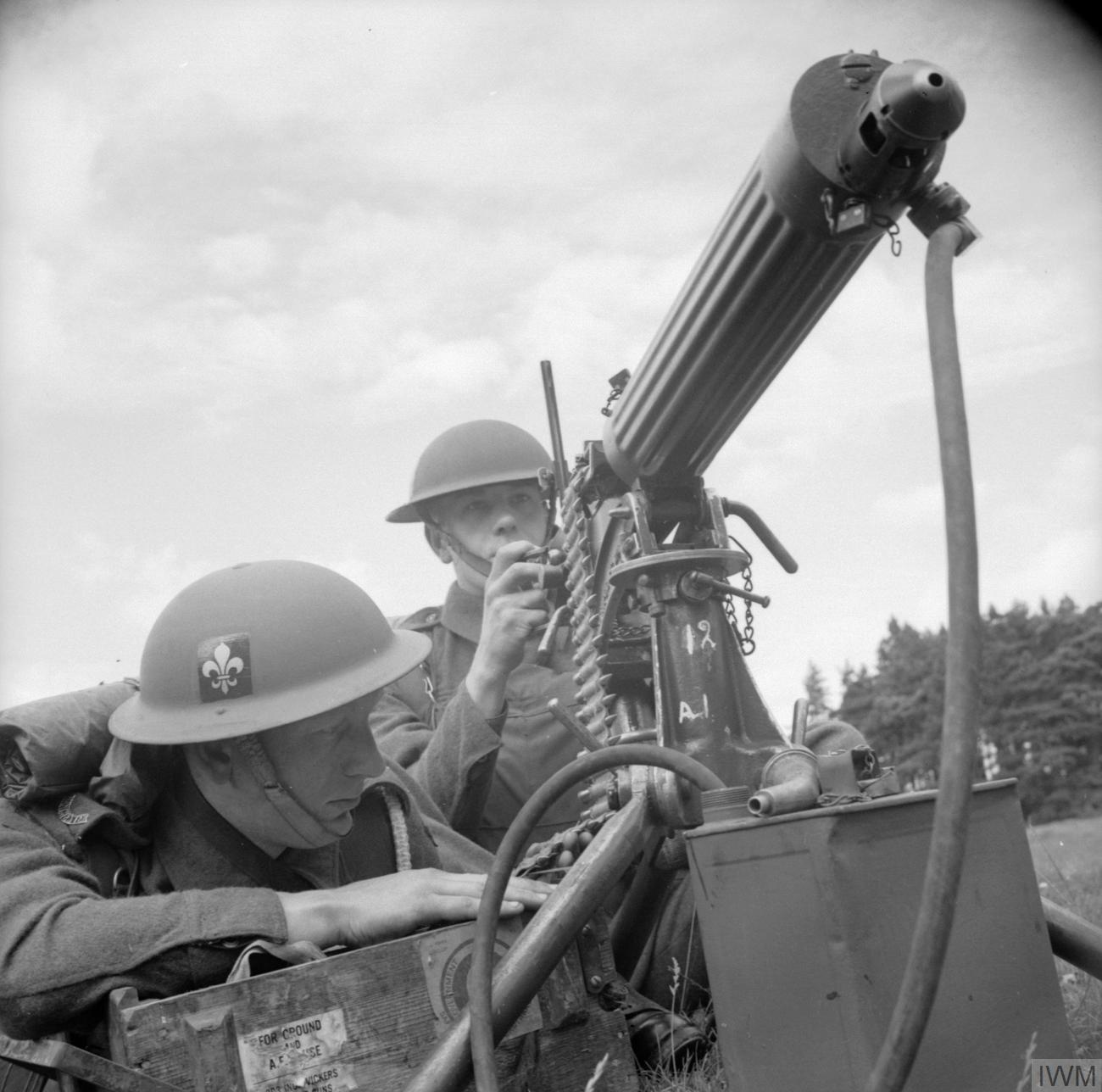
A soldier of the Manchester Regiment with the unit's fleur-de-lis cap badge on his helmet, 1941

Fleurs-de-lis are featured in the military heraldry of various nations.

The British Army's 63rd Regiment of Foot started using the fleur-de-lis as a regimental symbol from the mid-18th century onwards, supposedly to commemorate their role in Britain's capture of Guadeloupe from France in 1759. In 1881, the 63rd Regiment was reorganised into the Manchester Regiment, which also used the fleur-de-lis as a regimental symbol, and in 1923 it was officially approved as the regiment's cap badge. The regiment's successor unit, the King's Regiment, continued to use the same cap badge from 1958 until its amalgamation into the Duke of Lancaster's Regiment in 2006.

It is also the formation sign of the 2nd (Independent) Armored Brigade of the Indian Army, known as the 7th Indian Cavalry Brigade in First World War, which received the emblem for its actions in France.

In the United States, the New Jersey Army National Guard unit 112th Field Artillery (Self Propelled)—part of the much larger 42nd Infantry Division Mechanized—has the fleur-de-lis in the upper left side of their distinctive unit insignia; the U.S. Army's 2nd Cavalry Regiment, 319th Airborne Field Artillery Regiment, 62nd Medical Brigade, 256th Infantry Brigade Combat Team; and the Corps of Cadets at Louisiana State University. The U.S. Air Force's Special Operations Weather beret flash also used a fleur-de-lis in its design, carried over from its Vietnam War-era commando weatherman beret flash.

It is also featured by the Israeli Intelligence Corps established in the 1970s, and the First World War Canadian Expeditionary Force.

The Foreign Intelligence Service of Ukraine used the emblem with the coat of arms of Ukraine in conjunction with four golden fleurs-de-lis, along with the motto "Omnia, Vincit, Veritas".

== Religion and art ==
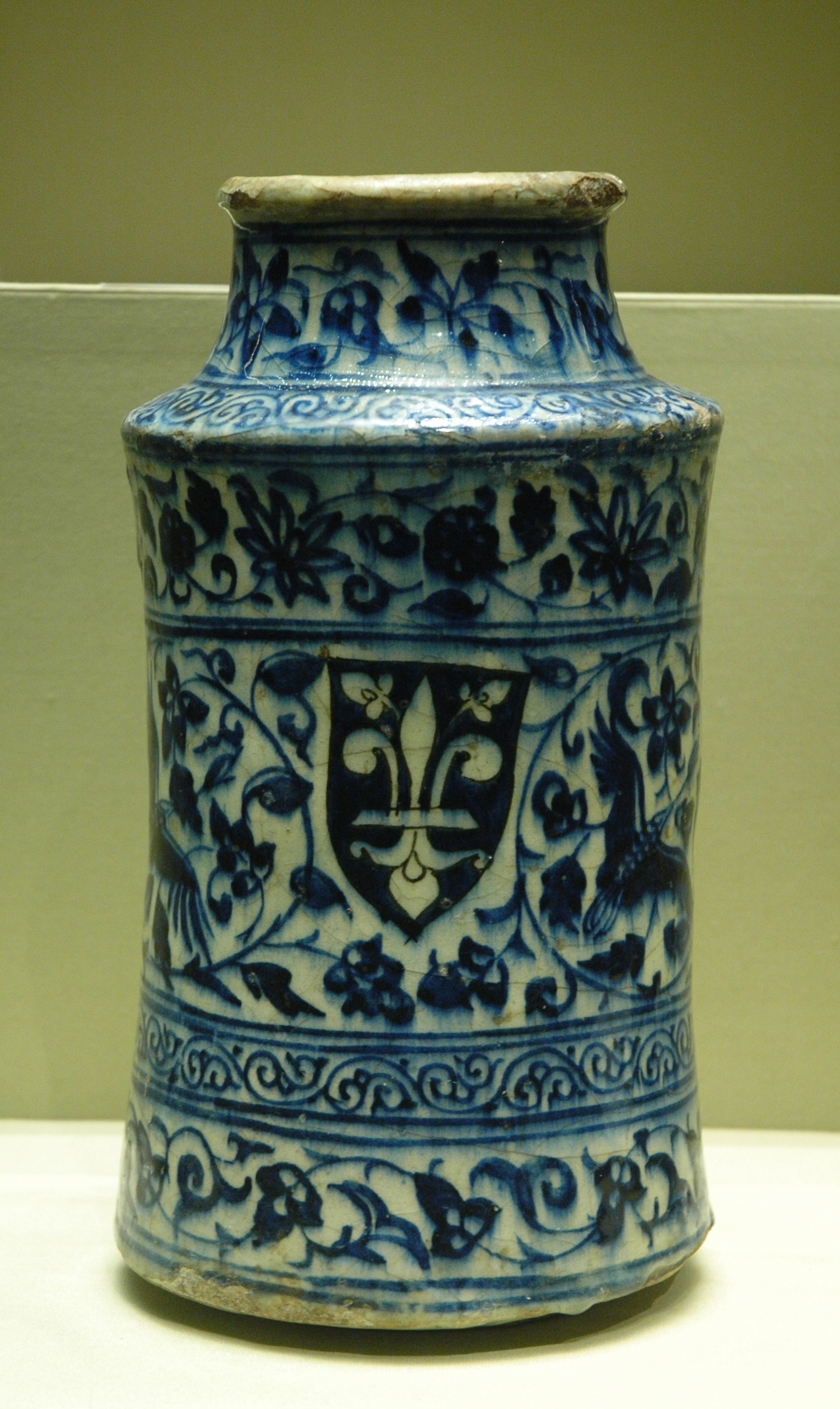
Fleur-de-lis on 14th-century Syrian albarello

A Huguenot cross; the twelve petals of the fleur-de-lys represent the twelve Apostles

In the Middle Ages, the symbols of lily and fleur-de-lis overlapped considerably in Christian religious art. The historian Michel Pastoureau says that until about 1300 they were found in depictions of Jesus, but gradually they took on Marian symbolism and were associated with the Song of Solomon's "lily among thorns" (lilium inter spinas), understood as a reference to Mary. Other scripture and religious literature in which the lily symbolizes purity and chastity also helped establish the flower as an iconographic attribute of the Virgin. It was also believed that the fleur-de-lis represented the Holy Trinity.

In medieval England, from the mid-12th century, a noblewoman's seal often showed the lady with a fleur-de-lis, drawing on the Marian connotations of "female virtue and spirituality". Images of Mary holding the flower first appeared in the 11th century on coins issued by cathedrals dedicated to her, and next on the seals of cathedral chapters, starting with Notre Dame de Paris in 1146. A standard portrayal was of Mary carrying the flower in her right hand, just as she is shown in that church's Virgin of Paris statue (with lily), and in the centre of the stained glass rose window (with fleur-de-lis sceptre) above its main entrance. The flowers may be "simple fleurons, sometimes garden lilies, sometimes genuine heraldic fleurs-de-lis". As attributes of the Madonna, they are often seen in pictures of the Annunciation, notably in those of Sandro Botticelli and Filippo Lippi. Lippi also uses both flowers in other related contexts: for instance, in his Madonna in the Forest.

The three petals of the heraldic design reflect a widespread association with the Holy Trinity, with the band on the bottom symbolizing Mary. The tradition says that without Mary no one can understand the Trinity since it was she who bore the Son. A tradition going back to 14th-century France added onto the earlier belief that they also represented faith, wisdom and chivalry. Alternatively, the cord can be seen as representing the one divine substance (godhood) of the three persons, which binds them together.

"Flower of light" symbolism has sometimes been understood from the archaic variant fleur-de-luce (see Latin lux, luc- = 'light'), but the Oxford English Dictionary suggests this arose from the spelling, not from the etymology.

== Civilian institutions and organisations ==
=== Education ===
The emblem appears in coats of arms and logos for universities (like Washington University in St. Louis, Saint Louis University in Spain, Rossall School in England (where it appears in the namesake Mitre Fleur De Lys boarding house), University of Lincoln in England and University of Louisiana at Lafayette) and schools such as in Hilton College (South Africa), Adamson University and St. Paul's University in the Philippines. The Lady Knights of the University of Arkansas at Monticello have also adopted the fleur de lis as one of the symbols associated with their coat of arms. The flag of Lincolnshire, adopted in 2005, has a fleur-de-lis for the city of Lincoln. It is one of the symbols of the American sororities Kappa Kappa Gamma and Theta Phi Alpha, the American fraternities Alpha Epsilon Pi, Sigma Alpha Epsilon and Sigma Alpha Mu, as well as the international co-ed service fraternity Alpha Phi Omega. It is also used by the high school and college fraternity Scouts Royale Brotherhood of the Philippines.

=== Scouting ===
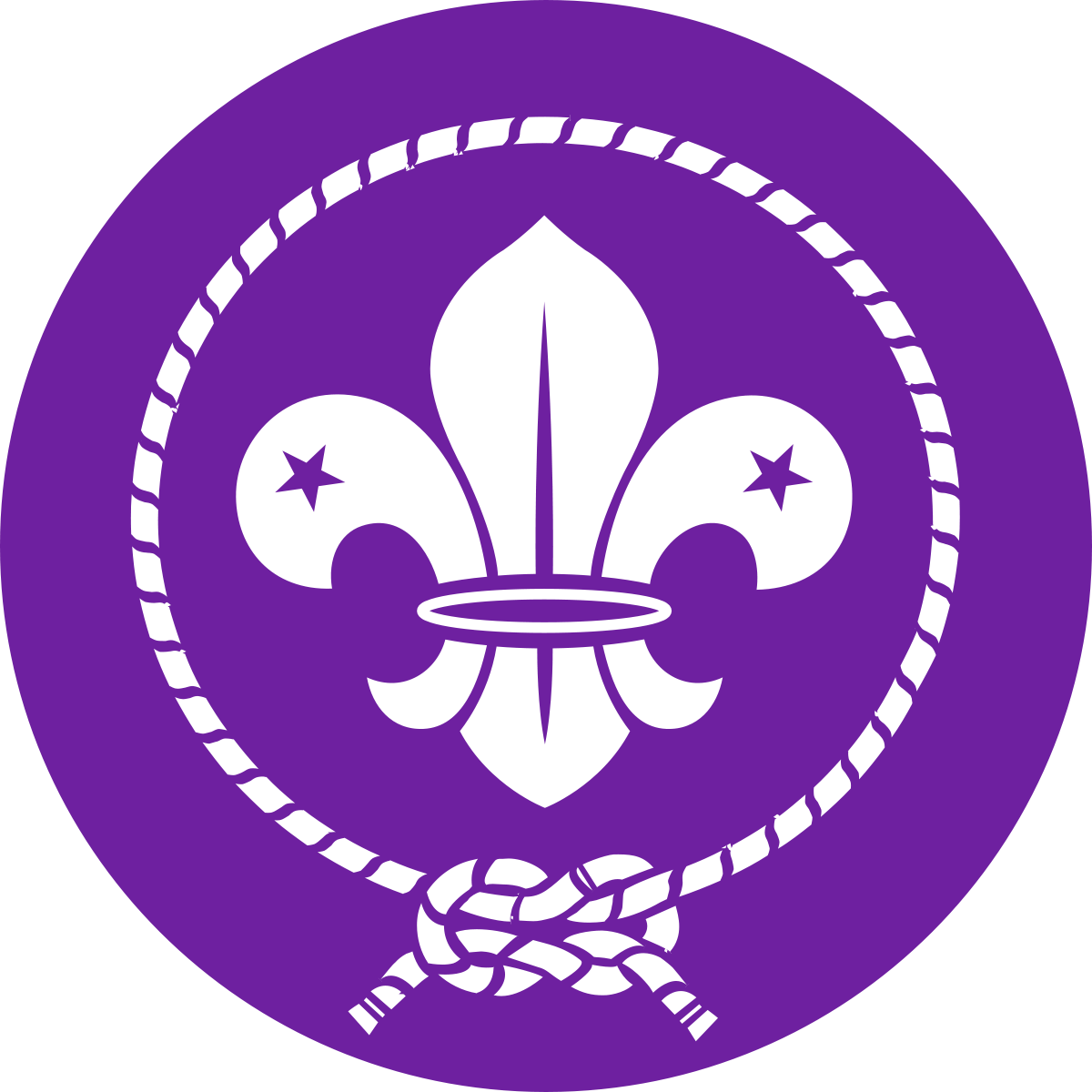
Emblem of the World Organization of the Scout Movement

The fleur-de-lis is the main element in the logo of most Scouting organizations. The symbol was first used by Sir Robert Baden-Powell as an arm-badge for soldiers who qualified as scouts (reconnaissance specialists) in the 5th Dragoon Guards, which he commanded at the end of the 19th century; it was later used in cavalry regiments throughout the British Army until 1921. In 1907, Baden-Powell made brass fleur-de-lis badges for the boys attending his first experimental "Boy Scout" camp at Brownsea Island. In his seminal book Scouting for Boys, Baden-Powell referred to the motif as "the arrowhead which shows the North on a map or a compass" and continued; "It is the Badge of the Scout because it points in the right direction and upward ... The three points remind you of the three points of the Scout Promise", being duty to God and country, helping others, and keeping the Scout Law. The World Scout Emblem of the World Organization of the Scout Movement has elements which are used by most national Scout organizations. The stars stand for truth and knowledge, the encircling rope for unity, and its reef knot or square knot, service.

=== Sports ===
Emblem of SV Darmstadt 98

The fleur-de-lis is used by a number of sports teams, especially when it echoes a local flag. This is true with the teams from Quebec (Nordiques (ex-NHL), Montreal Expos (ex-MLB) and CF Montréal (MLS)), the teams of New Orleans, Louisiana (Saints (NFL), Pelicans (NBA), and Zephyrs (PCL)), the Louisiana Ragin' Cajuns (NCAA Division I), the Serie A team Fiorentina, the Bundesliga side SV Darmstadt 98 (also known as Die Lilien – The Lilies), the Ligue 1 team Paris Saint-Germain, the rugby league team Wakefield Trinity Wildcats, the NPSL team Detroit City FC.

Logo of the New Orleans Saints football team.

Marc-André Fleury, a Canadian ice hockey goaltender, wore a fleur-de-lis logo on his mask. The UFC Welterweight Champion from 2006 to 2013, Georges St-Pierre, has a tattoo of the fleur-de-lis on his right calf. The IT University of Copenhagen's soccer team ITU F.C. has it in its logo. The official emblem for the 2019 FIFA Women's World Cup, which was hosted by France, included the symbol.

== Art and entertainment ==
=== Architecture and design ===
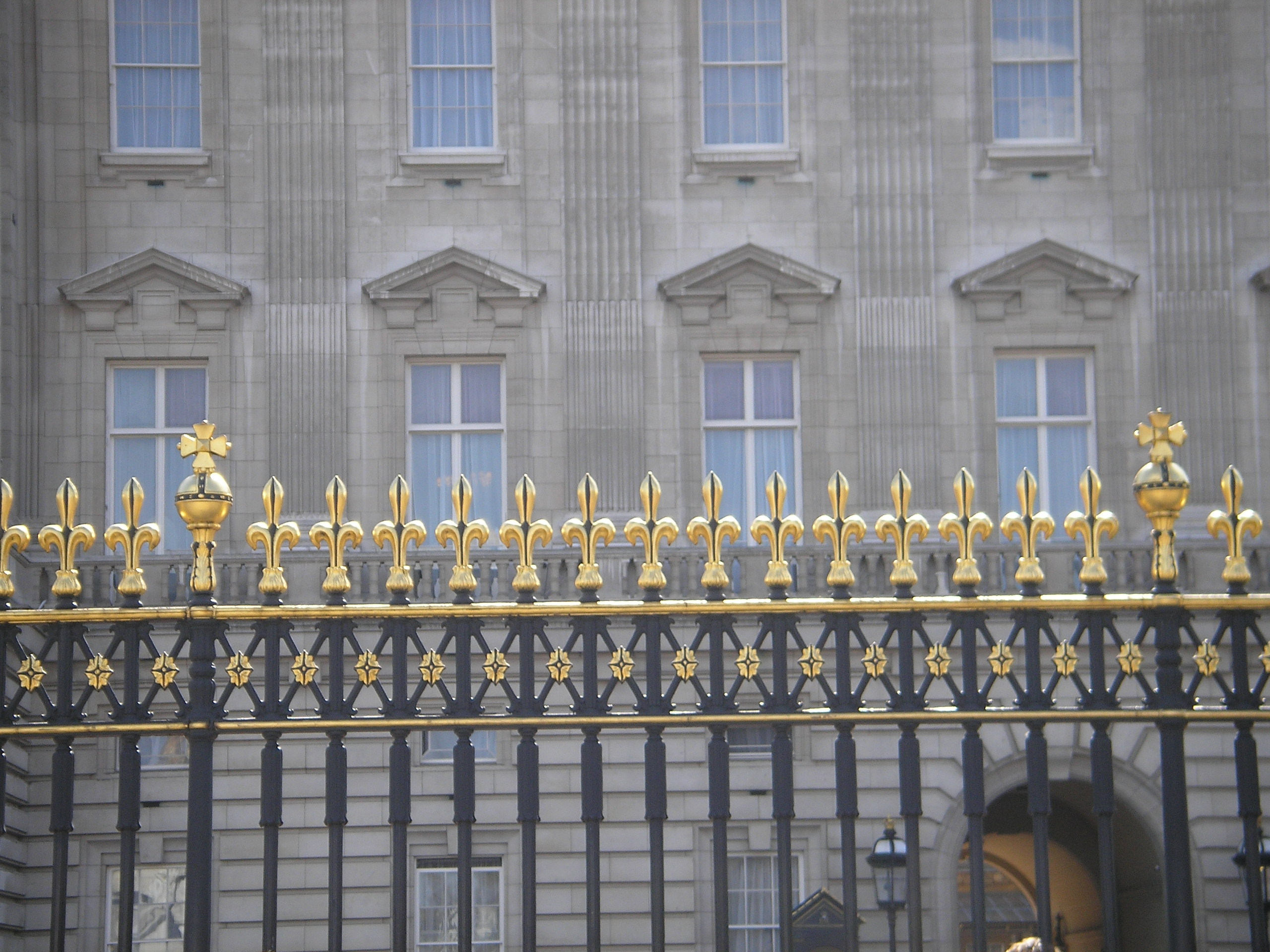
Fleurs-de-lis on railings at Buckingham Palace

Architects and designers use it alone and as a repeated motif in a wide range of contexts, from ironwork to bookbinding.

In building and architecture, the fleur-de-lis is often placed on top of iron fence posts, as a pointed defence against intruders. It may ornament any tip, point or post with a decorative flourish, for instance, on finials, the arms of a cross, or the point of a gable. The fleur-de-lis can be incorporated in friezes or cornices, although the distinctions between fleur-de-lis, fleuron, and other stylized flowers are not always clear, or can be used as a motif in an all-over tiled pattern, perhaps on a floor. It may appear in a building for heraldic reasons, as in some English churches where the design paid a compliment to a local lord who used the flower on his coat of arms. Elsewhere the effect seems purely visual, like the crenellations on the 14th-century Muslim Mosque-Madrassa of Sultan Hassan. It can also be seen on the doors of the 16th-century Hindu Padmanabhaswamy Temple.

=== Literature ===
During the reign of Elizabeth I of England, known as the Elizabethan era, it was a standard name for an iris, a usage which lasted for centuries, but occasionally refers to lilies or other flowers.

The lilly, Ladie of the flowring field,
The Flowre-deluce, her louely Paramoure

— Edmund Spenser, The Faerie Queene, 1590

=== Video games ===
A heavily stylized fleur de lis symbol can be recognized as the symbol of the protagonist, Agent 47, and his genetic father/creator, Dr. Orth-Meyer, in the Hitman series of video games.

In the Saints Row franchise, the fleur de lis is the Logo (called "Fleur De Saints") for the Third Street Saints.

In the Warhammer 40,000 franchise, the Fleur De Lis is the faction icon for the Adepta Sororitas.

The Pokémon villain Lysandre, whose debut game was Pokémon X and Y, is known in Japan as フラダリ Furadari meaning fleur-de-lis. Pokémon X and Y are inspired by France. Many locations and landmarks across Kalos have real-world inspirations, including Prism Tower (Eiffel Tower), the Lumiose Art Museum (the Louvre) and the stones outside Geosenge Town (Carnac stones).

The second form of Wuthering Waves character Cartethyia is named "Fleurdelys".

=== Music ===
New Orleans Louisiana sludge metal bands like Crowbar and Eyehategod have used Fleur De Lis as a logo for their bands and also as a logo mostly for the whole NOLA metal scene.

== Punishment ==
=== French colonial empire ===
In the French colonial empire, the Code Noir, a slave code drafted by Jean-Baptiste Colbert, stipulated that enslaved people should be branded with the fleur-de-lis as punishment for a variety of crimes, including attempting to escape enslavement or theft. French officials in the colony of Isle de France (modern-day Mauritius), which adopted the Code Noir in 1685, punished slaves who attempted to escape or stole property by branding them with the fleur-de-lis. In the French colony of Louisiana, which adopted the Code Noir in 1724, slaves who attempted to escape and were recaptured would be branded on one shoulder with the fleur-de-lis along with having their ears cut off. If they attempted to escape a second time, they would be punished by being branded with the fleur-de-lis again and have their hamstrings cut. Capital punishment was used for those who attempted to escape a third time.

Louisiana's version of the Code Noir stated:

XXXII. The runaway slave, who shall continue to be so for one month from the day of his being denounced to the officers of justice, shall have his ears cut off, and shall be branded with the fleur-de-lis on the shoulder: and on a second offence of the same nature, persisted in during one month from the day of his being denounced, he shall be hamstrung, and be marked with the fleur-de-lis on the other shoulder. On the third offence, he shall suffer death.

Branding slaves with the fleur-de-lis was also a punishment used in the French colony of Saint-Domingue.

=== France ===
Being branded with the fleur-de-lis was also a punishment used in Metropolitan France. In his 1577 biography of French Protestant reformer John Calvin, Jérôme-Hermès Bolsec claimed that Calvin had committed sodomy in his hometown of Noyon in 1527, and he only at the last minute escaped the standard punishment of death by burning, instead being branded with a fleur-de-lis on his shoulder. Bolsec's claims are today viewed as libellous slander, but they offer a window into what seemed a plausible punishment in his time. Alexandre Dumas used the motive of branding thieves with the fleur-de-lis when he created the character of Milady de Winter in his 1844 novel The Three Musketeers. He set the branding episode in 1619 France.

== See also ==
- Cross fleury
- Floral emblem
- Armorial of France
- The Golden Lily (disambiguation)
- Iris florentina
- Iris pseudacorus
- Jessant-de-lys
- Lilium
- Palmette
- Prince of Wales's feathers
- Shamrock
- Scottish thistle
- Tree of Life

Use of the lily in coinage and coat-of-arms in the land of Israel/Palestine

- Acre, Israel, where the Hospitaller refectory contains two early depictions of the French fleur-de-lis
- Hasmonean coinage, coins minted during Hasmonean rule, sometimes depicting a lily
- Yehud coinage, Achaemenid period coinage often depicting a lily
