= Mituva =

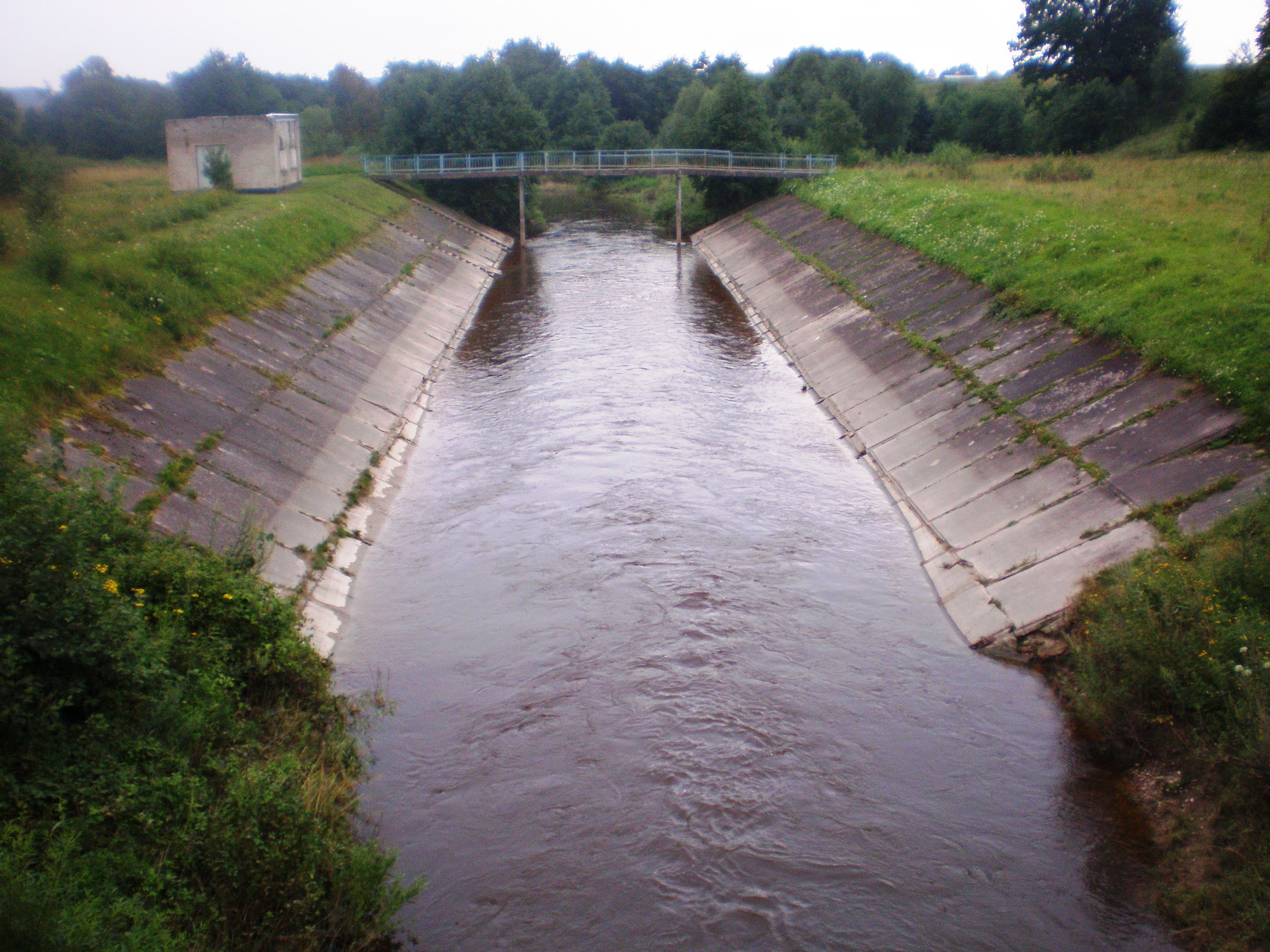

Location
- Country: Lithuania

Physical characteristics
- Source
  - location: Raseiniai district
- Mouth: Neman
  - coordinates: 55°04′29″N 22°45′20″E
- Length: 102 km (63 mi)
- Basin size: 773 km^{2} (298 sq mi)
- Discharge
  - average: 5.4 m^{3}/s (190 cu ft/s)

Basin features
- Progression: Neman→ Baltic Sea

The Mituva is a river in the western Lithuania (Raseiniai and Jurbarkas districts). It is a right-bank tributary of the Nemunas River. The Mituva originates 8 km northwest of Ariogala and just 1 km from the Dubysa river. It flows to the west and after confluence with the Vidauja river turns to the southeast. The Mituva joins with the Nemunas in Jurbarkas City.

The main tributaries are Gausantė, Snietala, Antvardė, Imsrė, Akmena, Alsa and Vidauja.
