= Flag and coat of arms of Jurbarkas =

Symbols of Jurbarkas, Lithuania

Jurbarkas
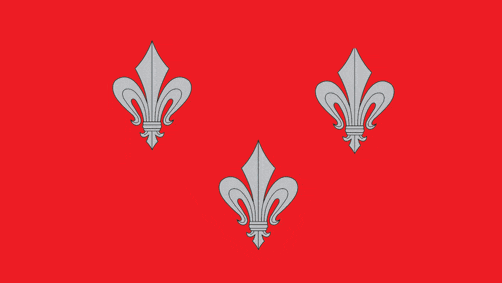
- Use: Municipal flag
- Adopted: 1611 (as arms); 24 November 1993
- Design: A red field charged with three silver-white fleur de lis two over one in its centre

Coat of arms of Jurbarkas
- Armiger: Jurbarkas
- Adopted: 1611
- Shield: A red shield charged with three silver-white fleur de lis two over one

The flag and coat of arms of Jurbarkas represents Jurbarkas, Lithuania with a red field charged with three silver-white fleurs-de-lis in the center, two over one. An example of heraldic flag design, the flag employs the city's coat of arms, making it a banner of arms. The design of the arms of Jurbarkas is believed to originate from the arms of the Sapieha house, a noble family from the Grand Duchy of Lithuania which was responsible for Jurbarkas receiving city rights and the coat of arms in 1611.

The three fleurs-de-lis design was abolished during the final years of the Polish–Lithuanian Commonwealth, but officially restored in 1993 after the independence of present-day Lithuania. Before restoration, several variant designs, such as using one over two fleurs-de-lis, had been restored and abolished. The original two over one version was briefly readopted in 1970 during the Soviet period, but abolished that same year.

== Gallery ==
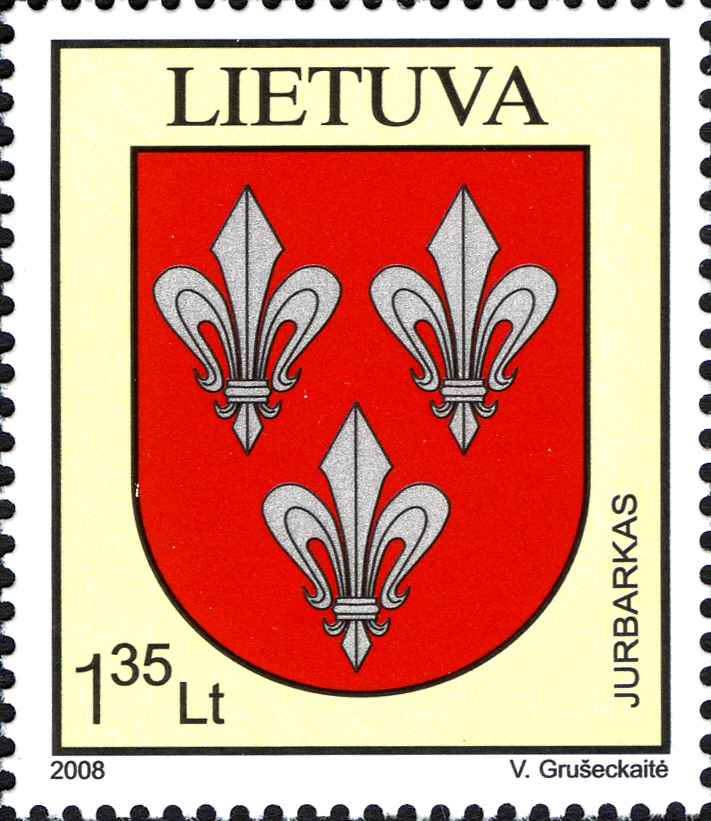
A Lithuanian stamp from 2008 featuring the coat of arms

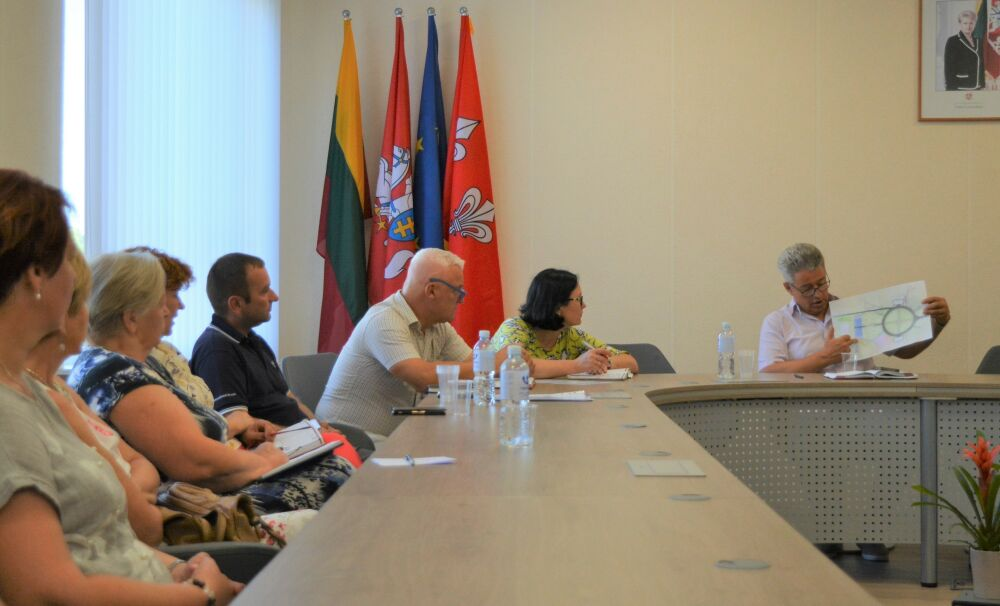
From left to right in the background: the civil flag of Lithuania, the state flag, the flag of Europe, and lastly the flag of Jurbarkas

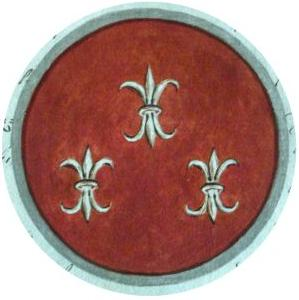
In 1792, the coat of arms was temporarily restored with a one over two design
