= Golden Lily =

Golden Lily or The Golden Lily may refer to:

== Plants ==
- Sandersonia, also known as golden lily of the valley
- Lilium bosniacum, also known as Zlatni Ljiljan (Bosnian, 'golden lily'), native to Bosnia and Herzegovina
- Bulbine bulbosa, or golden lily, endemic to Australia

== Arts and entertainment ==
- The Golden Lily, an 1899 book by Katharine Tynan
- The Golden Lily (Mead novel), a 2012 novel in the Bloodlines series by Richelle Mead
- Golden Lily, subtitle of Philippine TV series Wildflower (season 3)

== Other uses ==
- Golden Lily, Illinois, a place in the U.S.
- Golden Lily (Bosnia and Herzegovina), a national symbol of Bosnia and Herzegovina
- Kin no yuri (Japanese, 'The Golden Lily'), a secret Japanese WWII organization to loot gold
- The ŠKODA Award "The Golden Lily" for Best Film, awarded at the GoEast film festival 2001–2012
- Order of the Golden Lily, an order of Bosnia and Herzegovina
- Lis de Ouro (Golden Lily), an award in Scouting in Brazil
- Golden Lilies (Chinese: 金蓮), euphemism for bound feet in imperial China

== See also ==
- Fleur-de-lis, a stylized lily used as a decorative design or motif
