= Jurbarkas =

- City
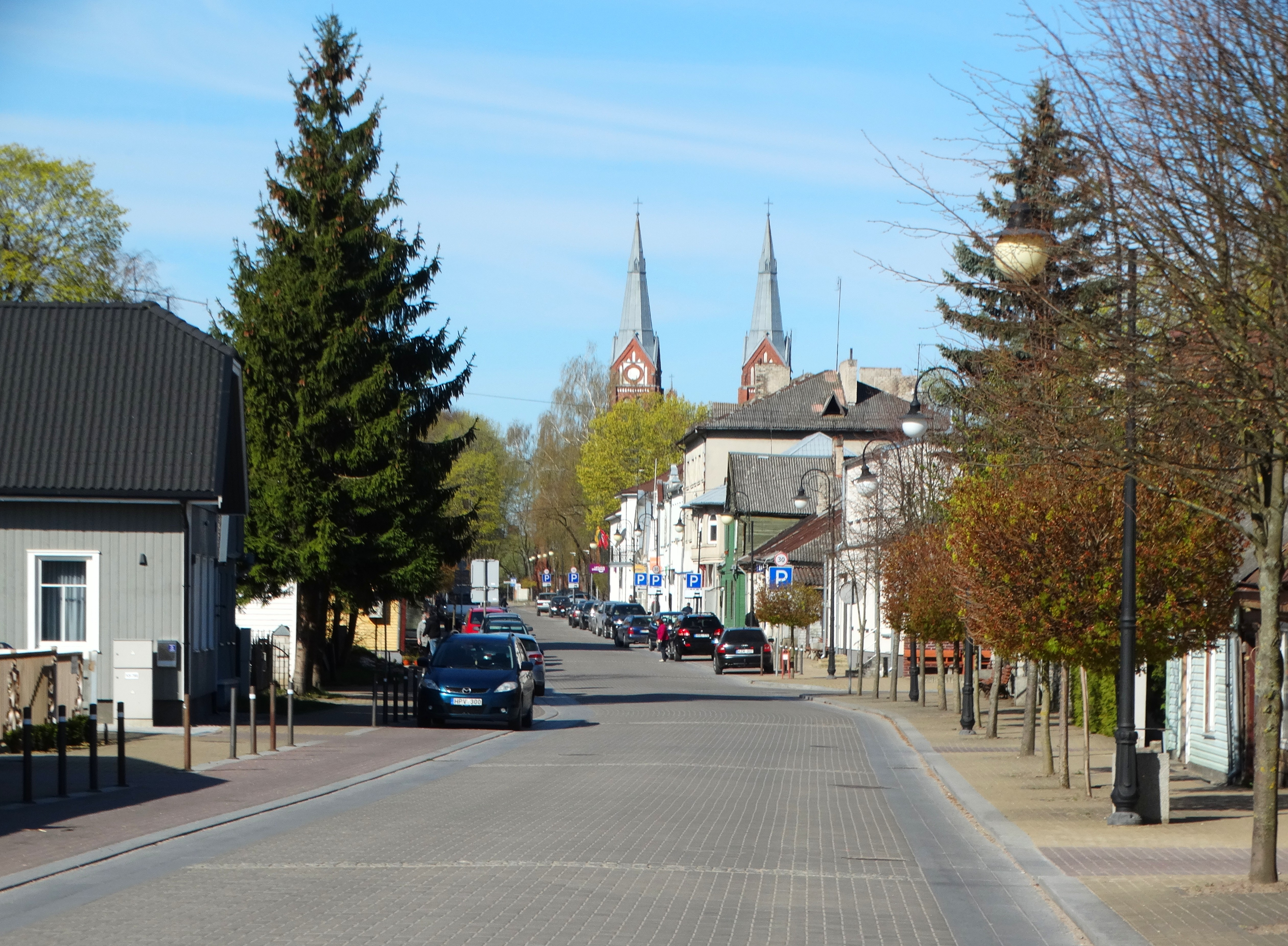

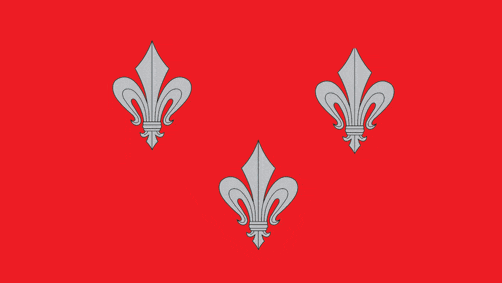
- Flag Coat of arms

- Location of Jurbarkas
- Coordinates: 55°5′N 22°46′E
- Country: Lithuania
- Ethnographic region: Samogitia
- County: Tauragė County
- Municipality: Jurbarkas district municipality
- Eldership: Jurbarkas city eldership
- Capital of: Jurbarkas district municipality Jurbarkas city eldership
- First mentioned: 1259
- Granted city rights: 1611

Population (2025)
  - Total: 11,412
- Time zone: UTC+2 (EET)
  - Summer (DST): UTC+3 (EEST)

Jurbarkas (Samogitian: Jorbarks, known also by several alternative names) is a city in Tauragė County, in Samogitia, Lithuania. Jurbarkas is located in the historic land of Karšuva. It is on the right-hand shore of the Nemunas at its confluence with the tributaries Mituva and Imsrė. The town became an important road junction after a bridge was built over the Nemunas in 1978.

== Etymology ==
The name Jurbarkas is derived from the Ordensburg castle, Georgenburg, built in the 13th century.

Jurbarkas has also been known by many derivate spellings in various languages throughout its history. The most notable non-Lithuanian names for the city include: in Samogitian Jorbarks, in German Georgenburg, Jurgenburg, and Eurburg, in Polish, Jurbork, and in Yiddish יורבורג (Yurburg).

== History ==
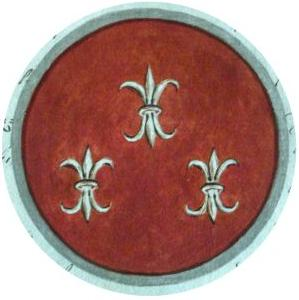
Jurbarkas coats of arms in 1792

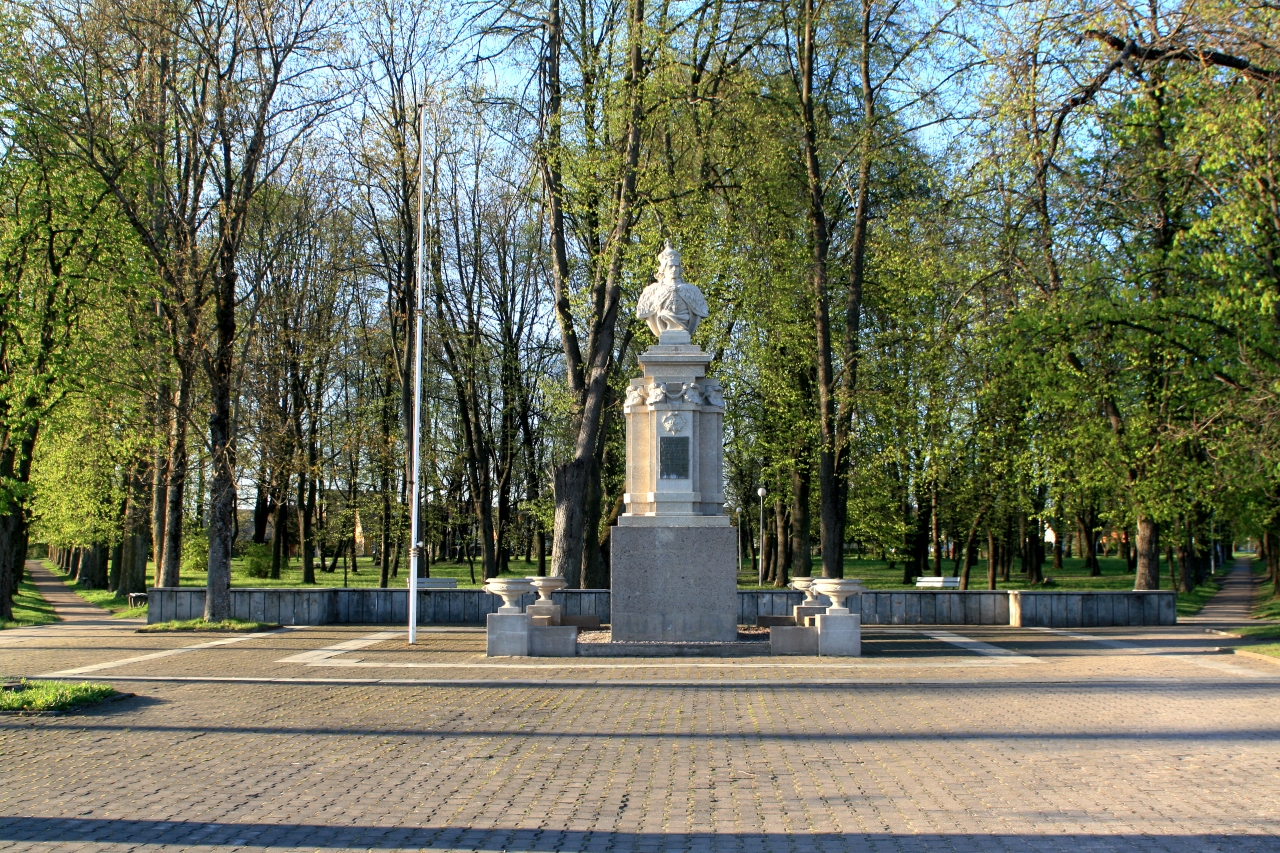
Vytautas the Great Monument

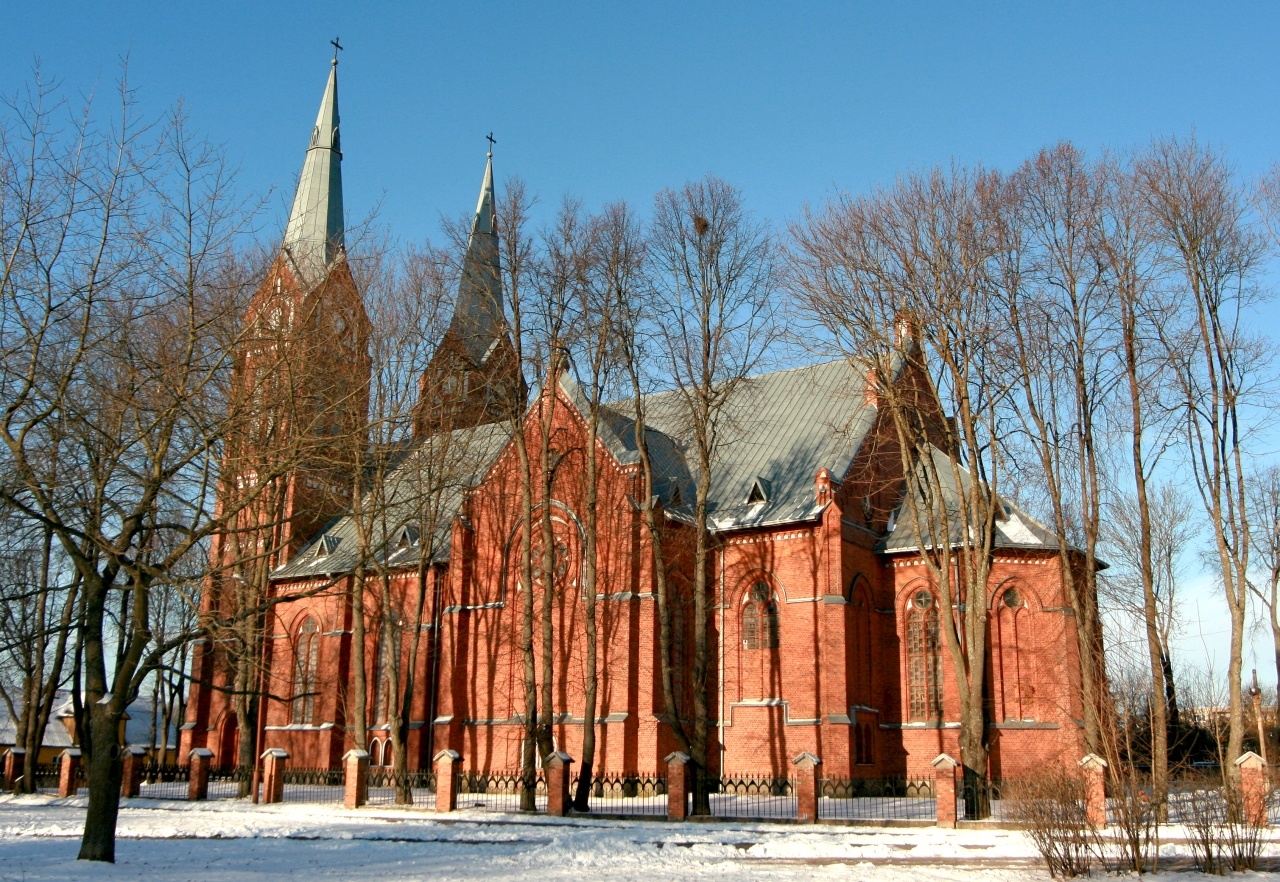
Church of the Holy Trinity

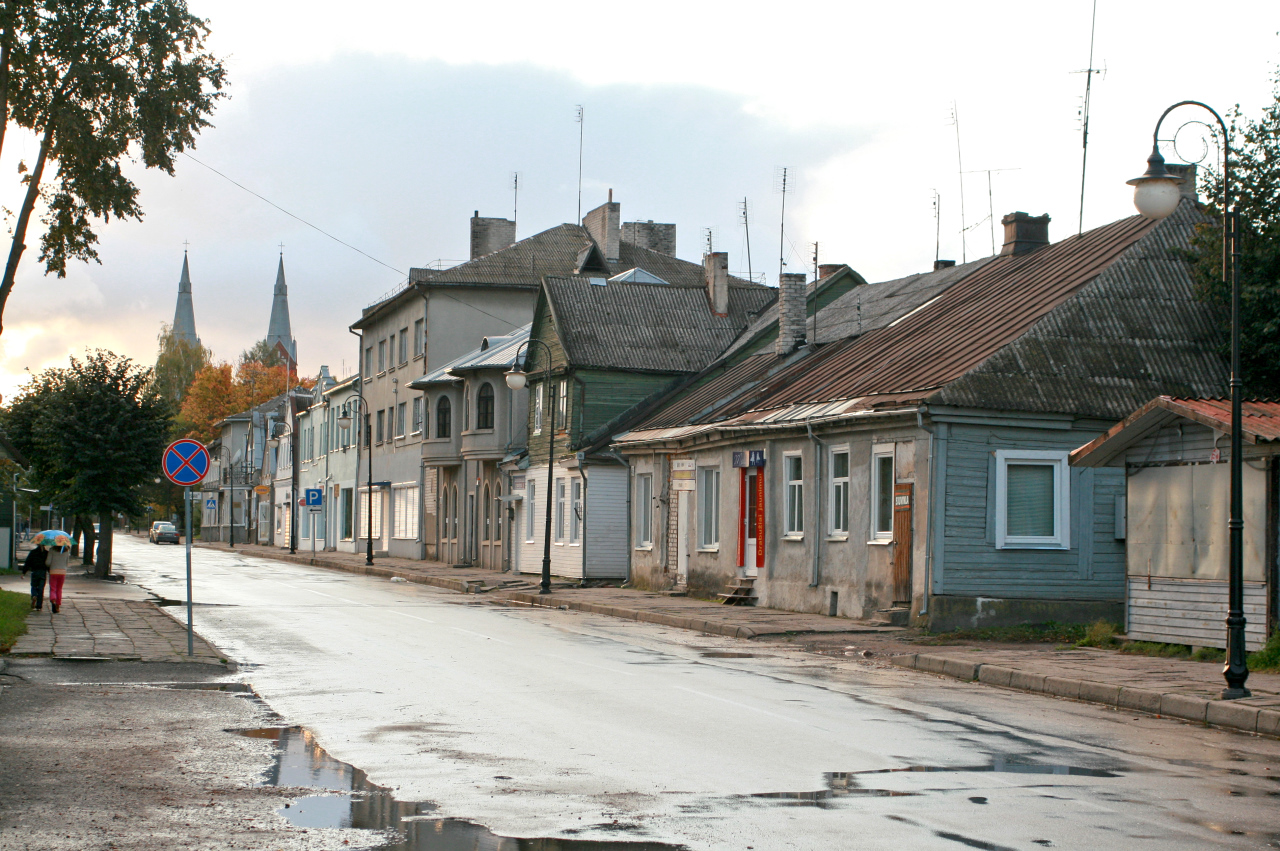
Old town of Jurbakas

Although Jurbarkas is said to have been a seat of Lithuanian princes from the Palemonids legend, it was first documented in 1259 as the Teutonic Knights' Ordensburg castle of Georgenburg ("George's castle") southwest from the confluence of Mituva and Nemunas. This castle was constructed 3 km (1.9 mi) west of the current town on a hill now known as Bišpiliukai, while the Lithuanians built a castle on Bišpilis hill by the river Imsrė.

The castle of Georgenburg was destroyed by the Grand Duke Vytautas in 1403 and was never rebuilt. The region was included within Lithuania in the Treaty of Melno in 1422, and the current site of Jurbarkas began to develop as a town and customs point, growing through the exporting of lumber on the Nemunas to Ducal Prussia. In 1430 a first church was built. Around 1540 new settlement have risen, in 1545 new church and parish primary school was built. In 1561 Jurbarkas comprised 82 houses. In 1569 Jurbarkas had about 600 inhabitants, small shops and inns, market place was present. In 1586 famous chronicler Maciej Stryjkowski became a church provost in Jurbarkas. King Sigismund III Vasa granted Jurbarkas its Magdeburg rights in 1611. In 1673 Jurbarkas comprised 56 houses.

In 1795 Jurbarkas was annexed by the Russian Empire during the third partition of the Polish–Lithuanian Commonwealth and was part of Vilna Governorate, later a part of Kovno Governorate (1843–1915). Its growth stagnated during the 19th century as traffic on the Nemunas decreased because of the rise of railways. The town was briefly liberated from the occupying Russian forces by the insurgents during the November Uprising in 1831. Because of its riverside location, Jurbarkas often suffered from floods (notably in 1862). 120 houses burned down from a fire in 1906.

Soviet occupants deported 78 residents of Jurbarkas in 1941–51. During the years of Lithuanian anti-Soviet partisan resistance (1944–1953) in Jurbarkas and neighbouring districts Lithuanian Laisvės gynėjų rinktinė (The Freedom Defenders Squad), belonging to partisans' Kęstutis military district was active.

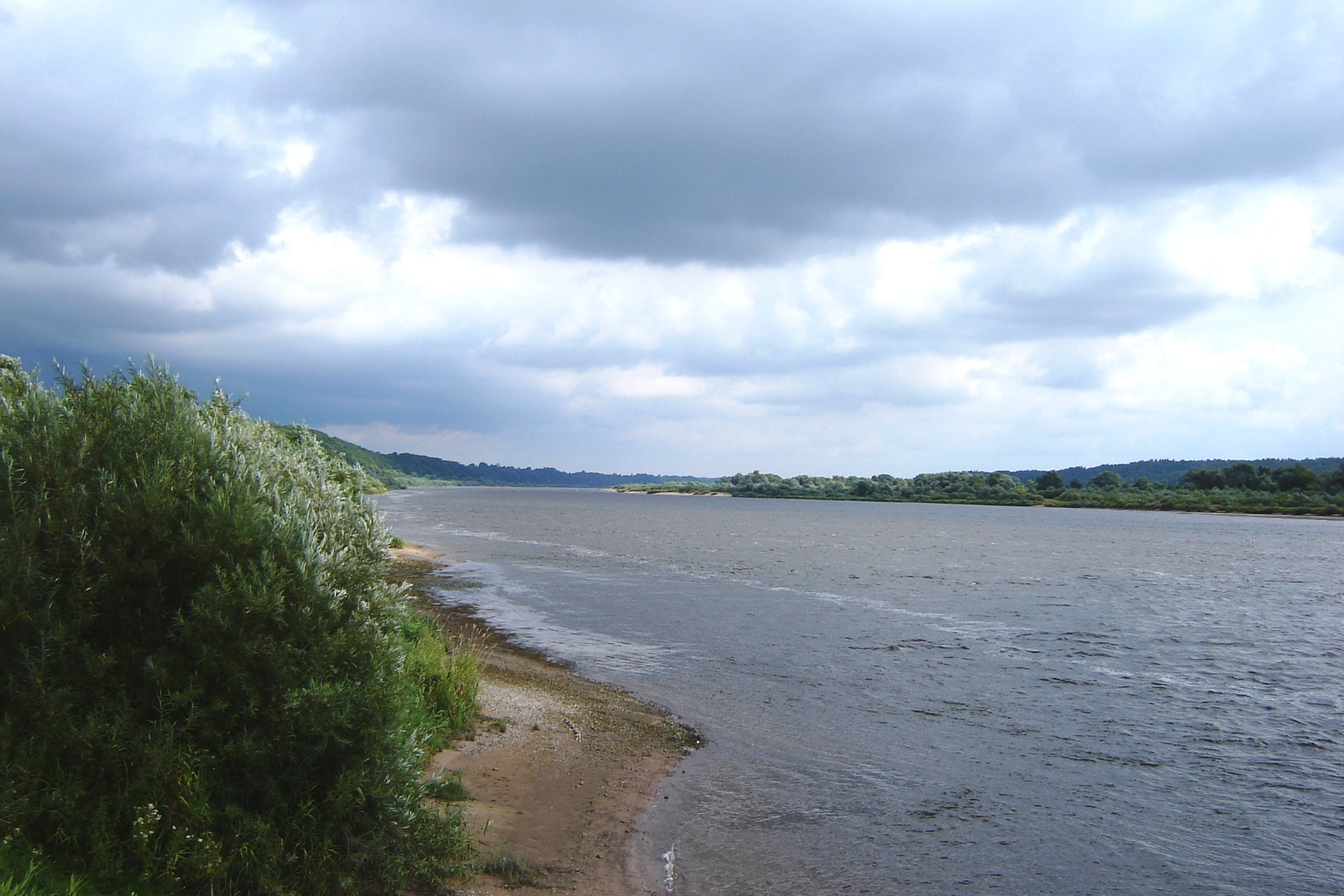
Nemunas river by Jurbarkas

== Jewish community ==
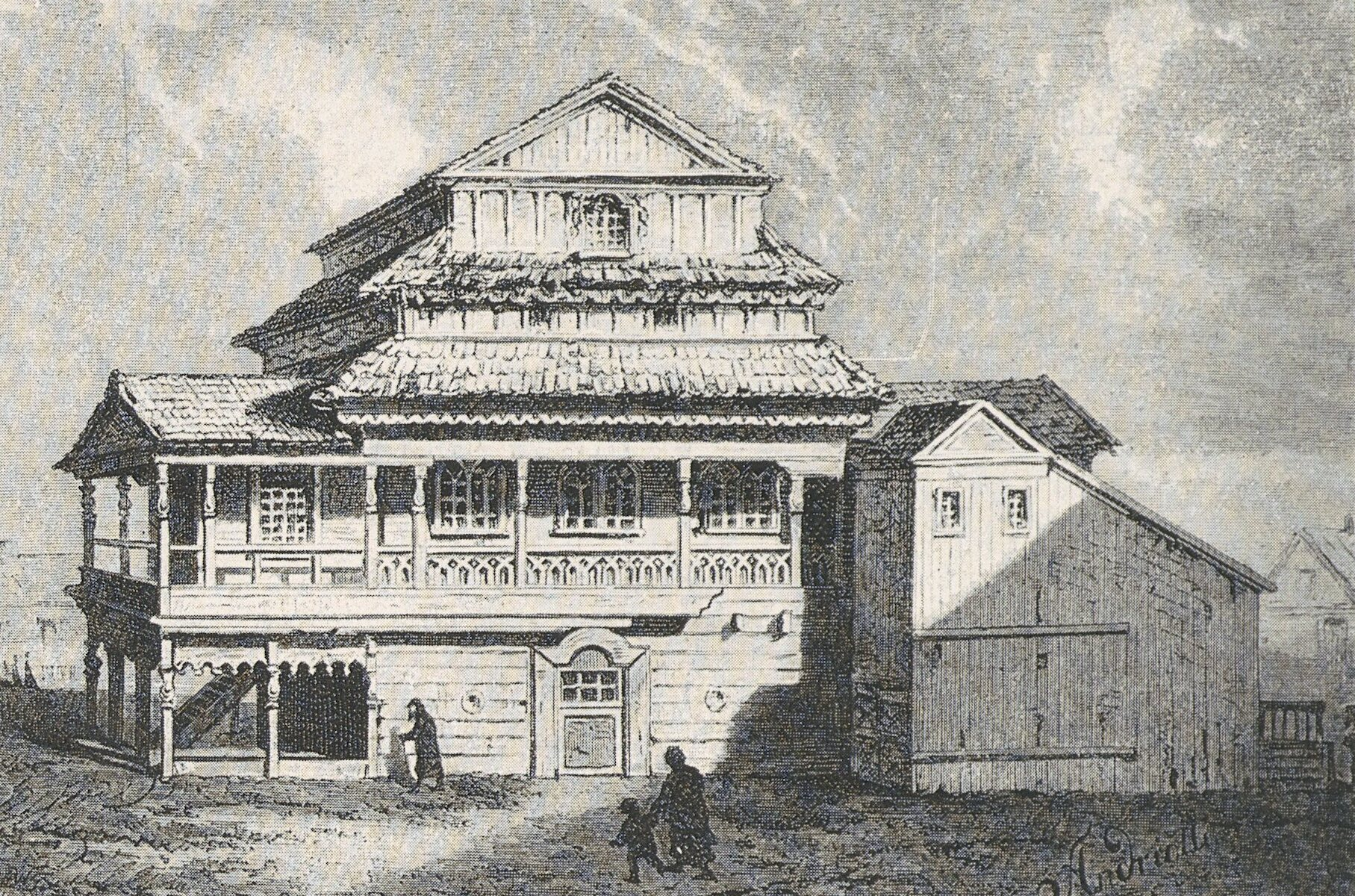
A synagogue in Jurbarkas in the 19th century, by Michał Elwiro Andriolli

Jurbarkas was for centuries a multi-ethnic community. During the 17th century some of the town's Jewish population were employed as tax collectors for the Lithuanian government. By 1714 Jubarkas had 2,333 Jews. By 1790 the town had a Jewish cemetery and a Wooden synagogue, one of the oldest in the region. In 1862 there were 2,550 Jews. In 1843 Emperor Nicholas I ordered that Jews living within 50 km (31 mi) of the Empire's western border should relocate eastward, but Jurbarkas was one of 19 towns which disobeyed the order. The Jewish Enlightenment (Haskalah) prospered in Jurbarkas.

Many of the town's citizens left during World War I, although some returned. It became part of Raseiniai County in the independent Lithuania created after the war. The population decreased from 7,391 in 1897 to 4,409 in 1923. The Jewish population decreased over the same period from 2,350 to 1,887, though that represented an increase from 32% to 43%. A government census in Jurbarkas in 1931 indicated that Jews owned 69 of 75 business and 18 of 19 light industries.

The Soviet Union occupied the town in 1940 during World War II and nationalized many of the Jewish-owned companies. Jewish cultural organizations were also suppressed. Jurbarkas was invaded by Nazi Germany on 22 June 1941, the first day of Operation Barbarossa. Among other persecutions, Lithuanian collaborators forced the Jews to destroy the wooden synagogue. The Jewish population of Jurbarkas was systematically killed in 1941. A few dozen Jews from the town and escapees from the Kaunas Ghetto formed a partisan group to attack Nazi forces, although the majority were killed. A monument at the mass graves was constructed after the war to honor the Holocaust victims.

Few of Jurbarkas Jewish citizens survived World War II. Of those that did, some remained in Vilnius or Kaunas after the War, while most emigrated to Palestine, the US, Canada, Mexico, South Africa, Germany, or other nations – in some cases joining family and friends who had left Lithuania before the War.

== Famous residents ==
- Vincas Grybas (1890–1941), sculptor
- Romualdas Marcinkus (1907–1944), Footballer, and military pilot during World War II, air reconnaissance specialist.
- Maciej Stryjkowski (ca. 1547 – ca. 1593), Polish-Lithuanian historian, writer and poet
- William Zorach (1887–1966), Jewish sculptor
- Antanas Šabaniauskas (1903–1987), Lithuania’s leading pop tenor.

== Twin towns – sister cities ==
Jurbarkas is twinned with:

- Crailsheim, Germany
- Criuleni, Moldova
- Hajnówka, Poland
- Laakdal, Belgium
- Lichtenberg (Berlin), Germany
- Ryn, Poland
