= Barzdai =

- Town
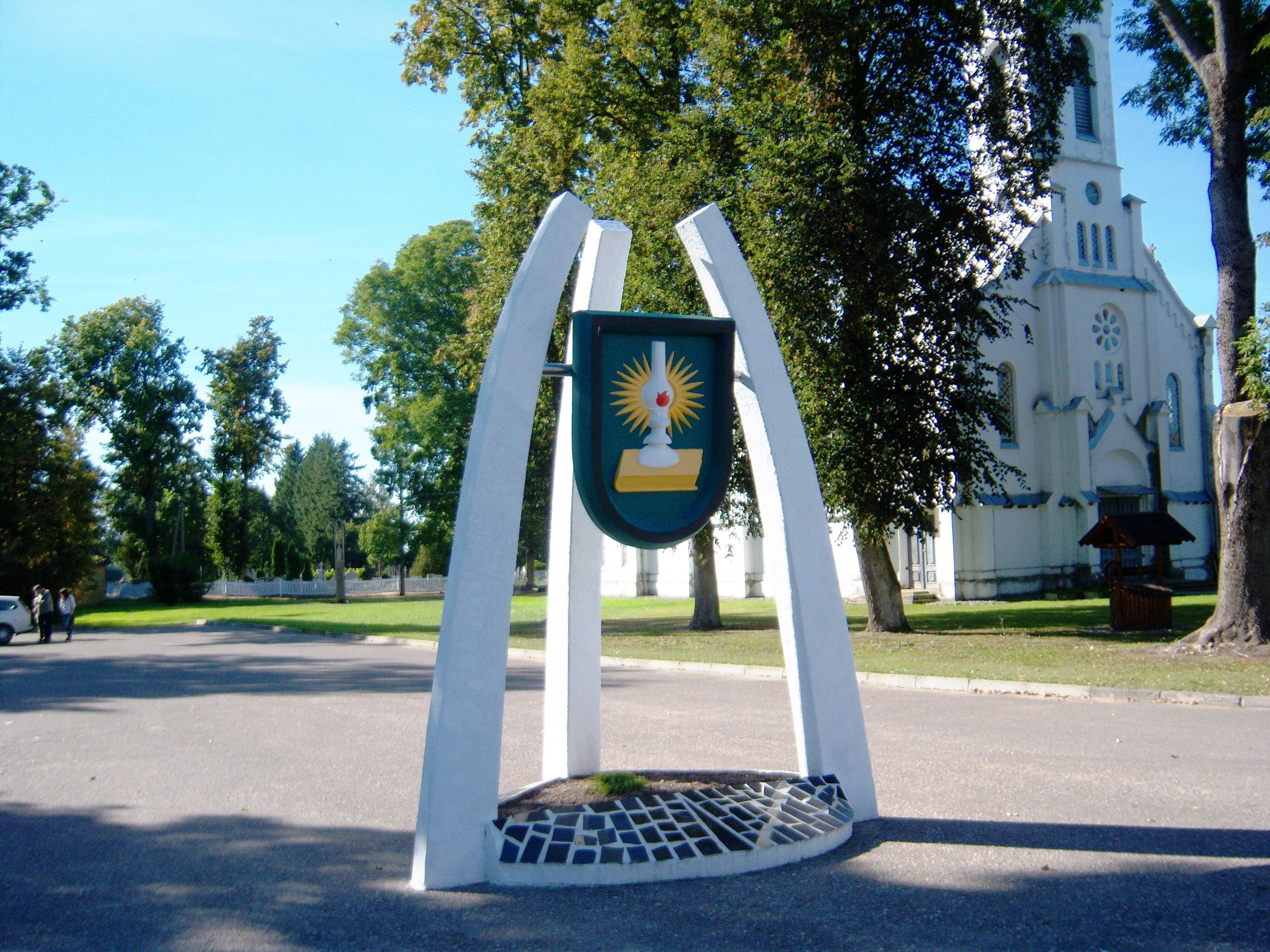

- Seal

- Location within Lithuania
- Coordinates: 54°46′50″N 23°11′40″E
- Country: Lithuania
- County: Marijampolė County

Population (2011)
  - Total: 385
- Time zone: UTC+2 (EET)
  - Summer (DST): UTC+3 (EEST)

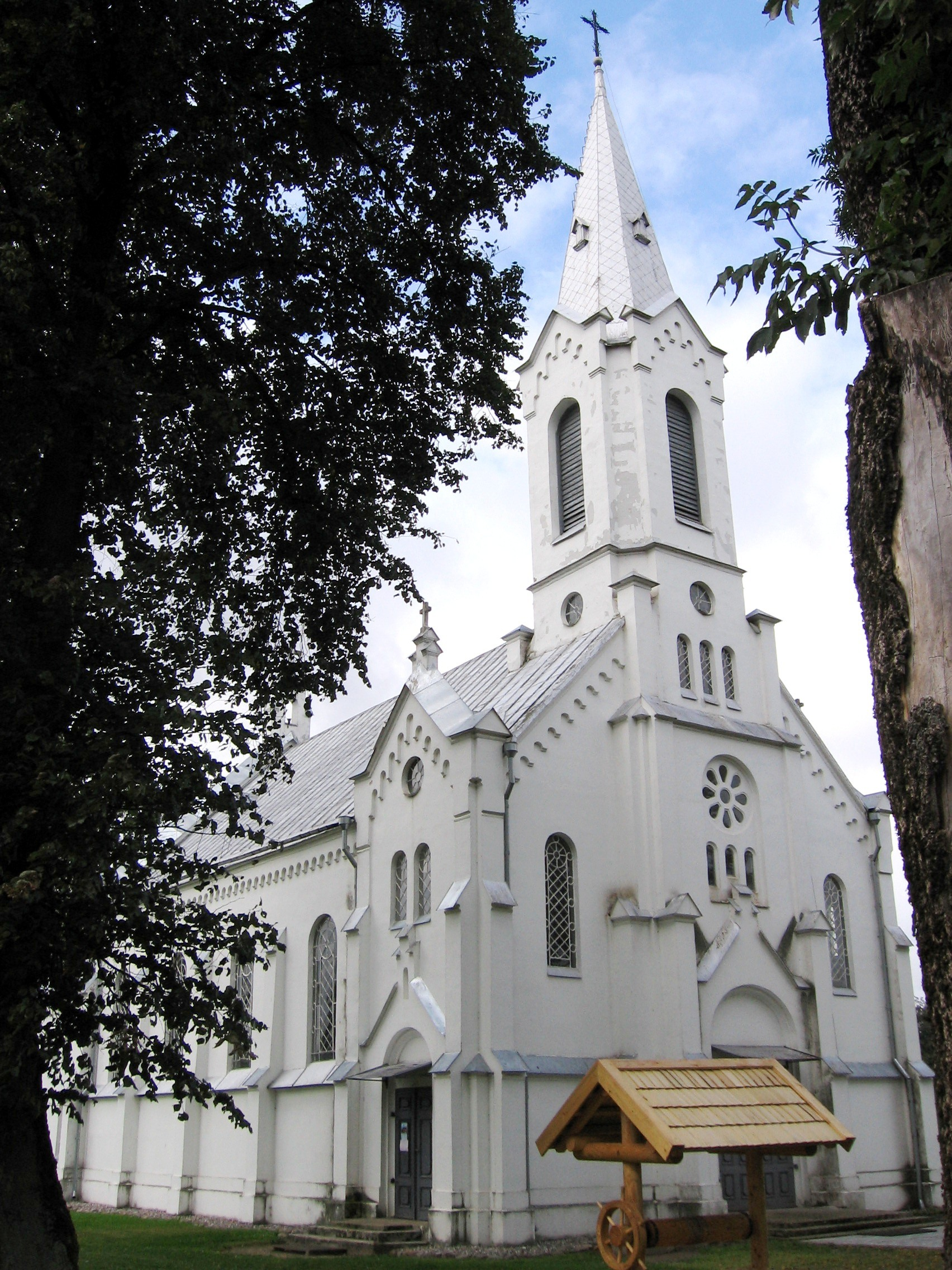
Christ the King Church

Barzdai is a small town in Marijampolė County, in southwestern Lithuania. According to the 2011 census, the town has a population of 385 people.
