= Jaunpils Municipality =

Municipality of Latvia

Coordinates: 56°44′00″N 23°01′03″E

Jaunpils Municipality Jaunpils novads
- Municipality
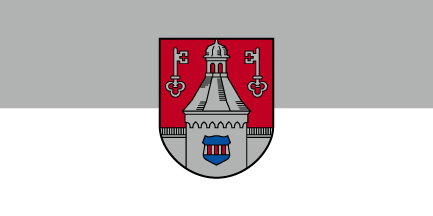
- Flag Coat of arms

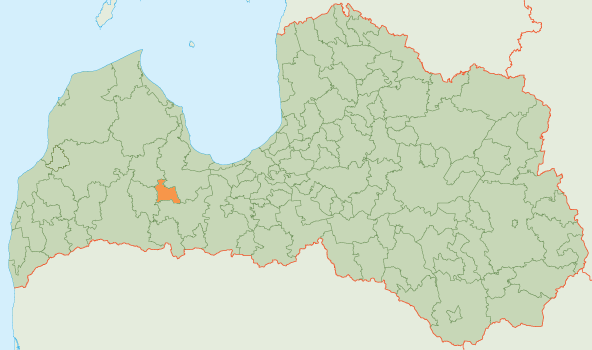
- Country: Latvia
- Formed: 2009
- Centre: Jaunpils

Government
  - Chairwoman: Ligita Gintere (LZS)

Area
  - Total: 209.46 km^{2} (80.87 sq mi)
  - Land: 203.97 km^{2} (78.75 sq mi)
  - Water: 5.49 km^{2} (2.12 sq mi)

Population (2021)
  - Total: 2,188
  - Density: 10.73/km^{2} (27.78/sq mi)
- Website: www.jaunpils.lv

Jaunpils Municipality (Latvian: Jaunpils novads) is a former Latvian municipality situated partly in the region of Semigallia and partly in Courland. The municipality was formed in 2009 by merging Jaunpils Parish and Viesati Parish, the administrative centre being Jaunpils. As of 2020, the population was 2,141.

On 1 July 2021, Jaunpils Municipality ceased to exist and its territory was merged into Tukums Municipality.

== See also ==
- Administrative divisions of Latvia (2009)

== Gallery ==
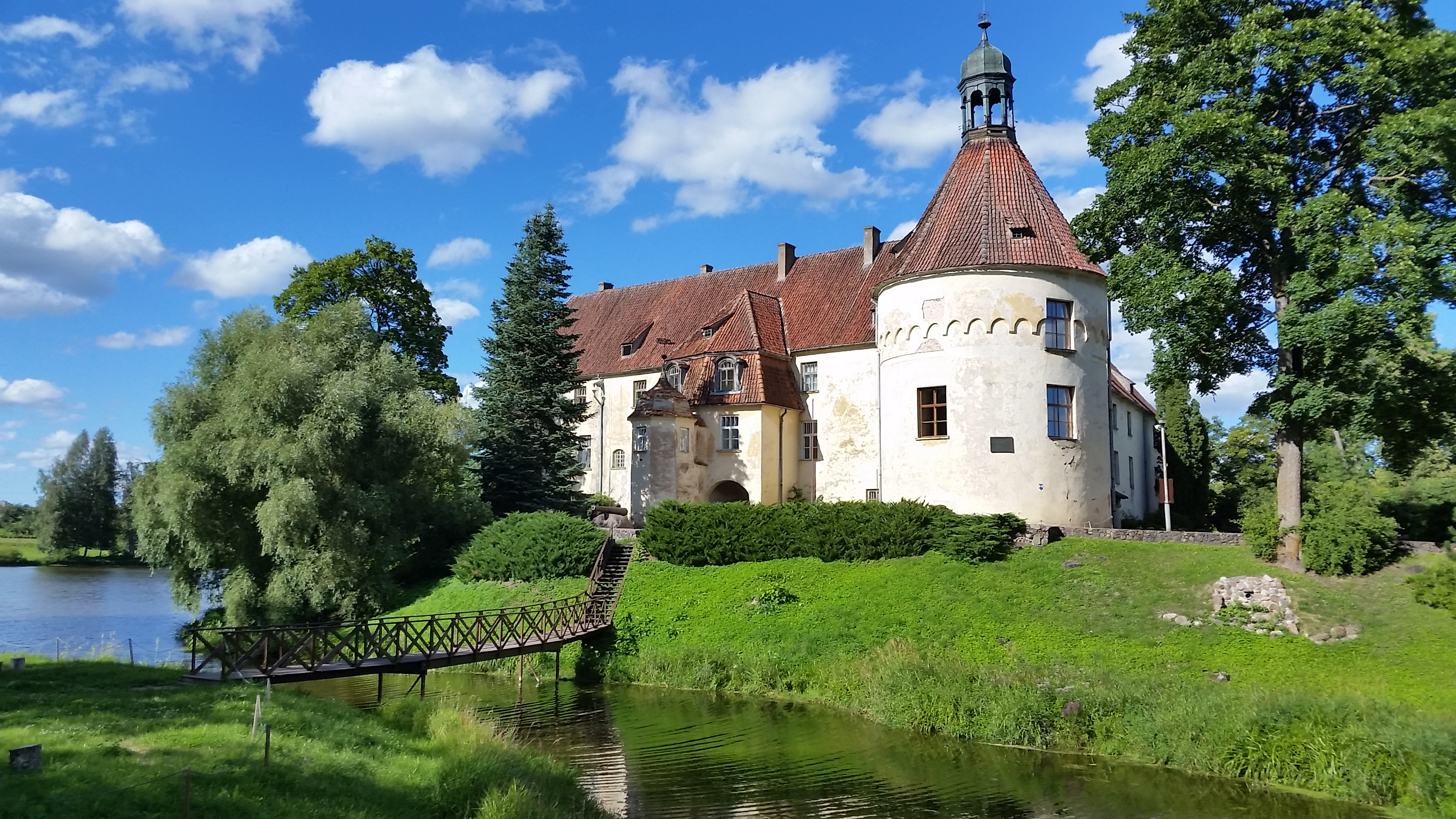
Jaunpils Castle

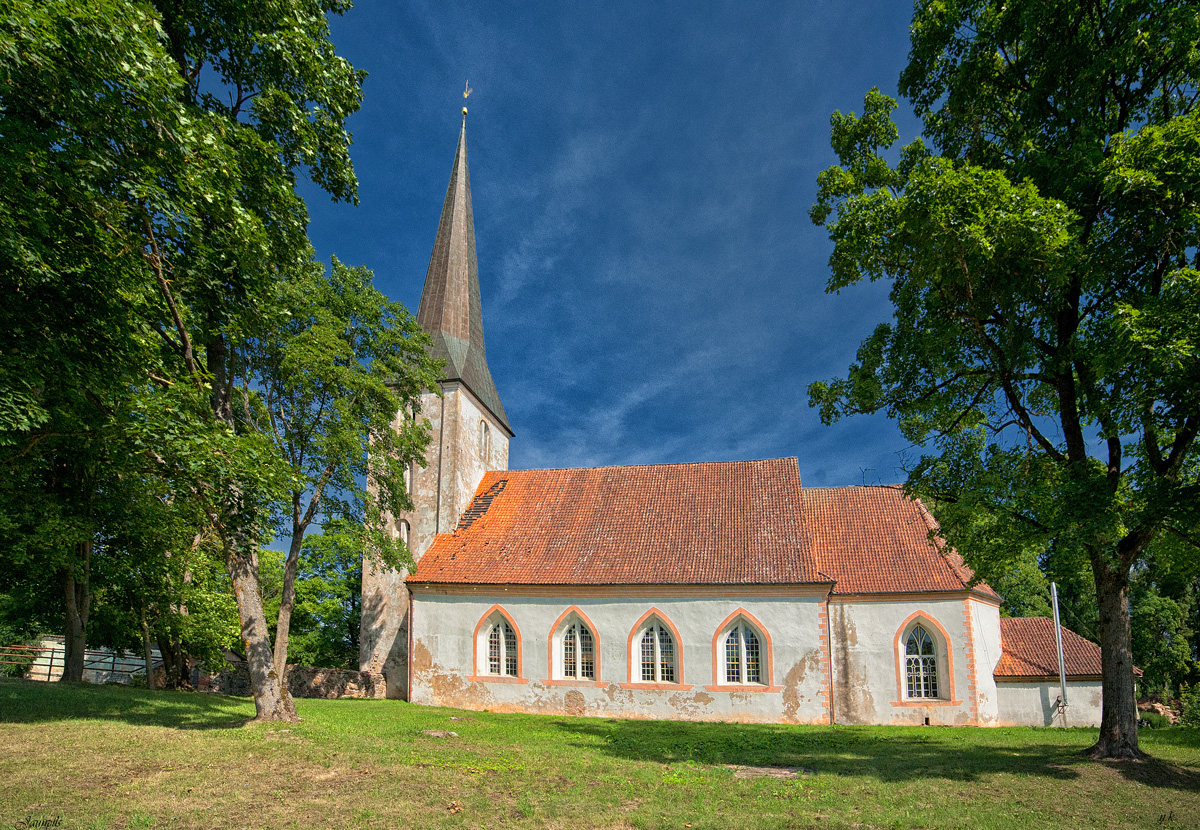
Lutheran church in Jaunpils

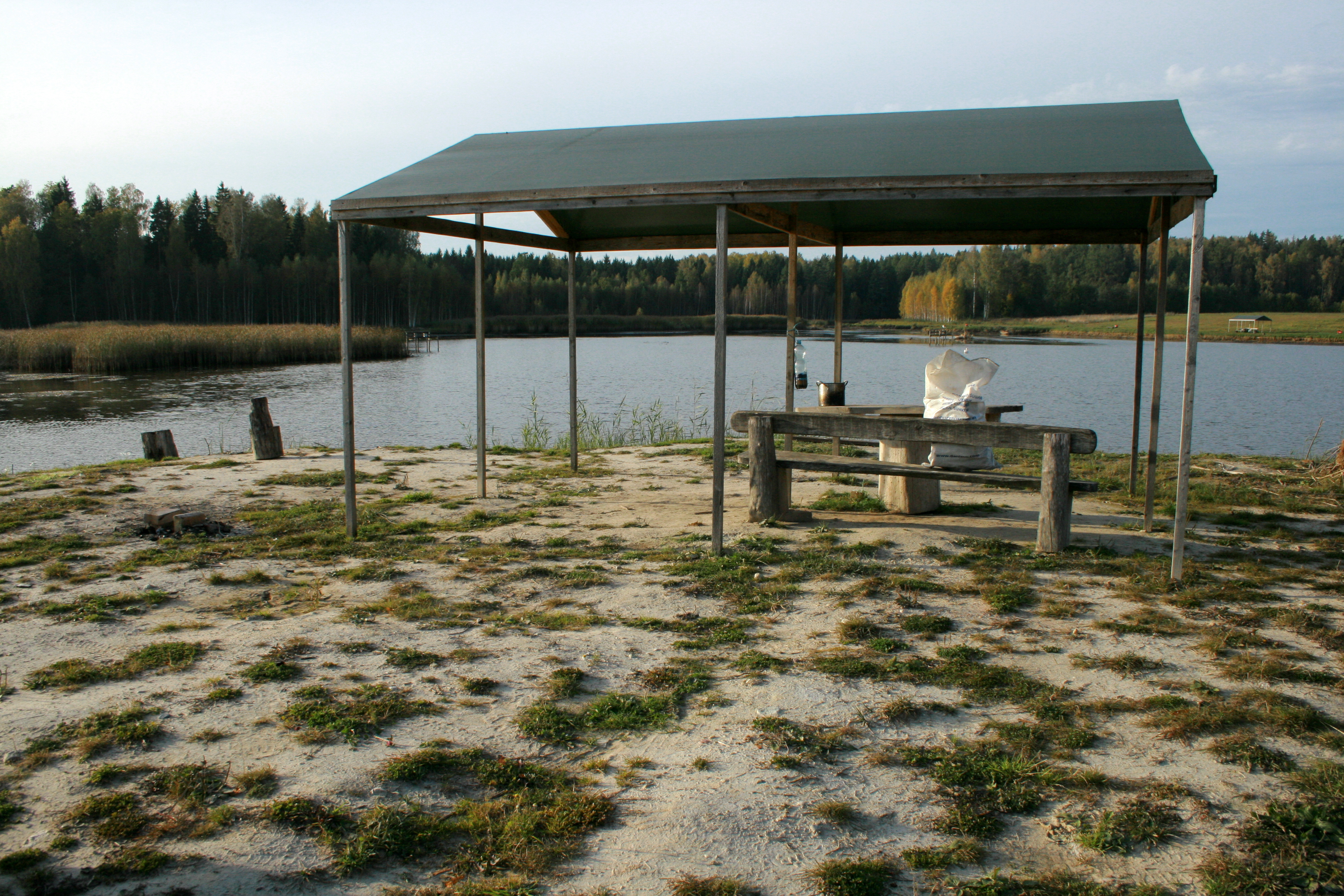
The fishing place
