= Zemīte Parish =

Administrative unit in Latvia

- parish of Latvia
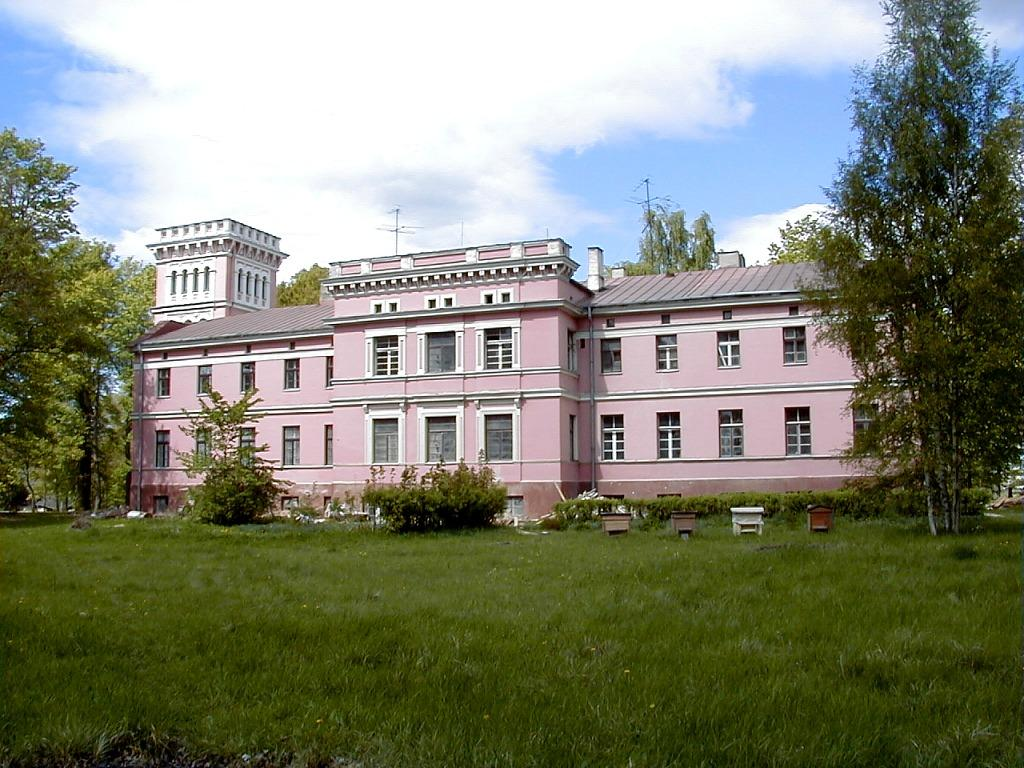
- Casa Senyorial de Zemite

- Coat of arms

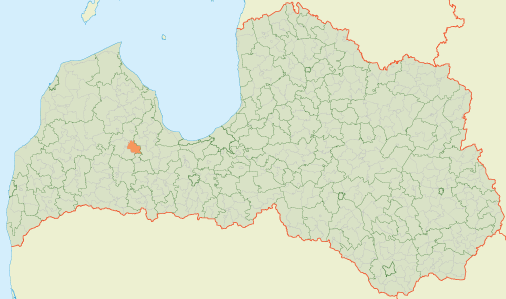
- Coordinates: 56°55′42″N 22°47′40″E
- Country: Latvia

Population (1 January 2026)
  - Total: 548
- Postal code: 3135

Zemīte parish is an administrative unit of Tukums Municipality in the Courland region of Latvia. It borders the parishes of its municipality- Zante, Vāne, Kandava, Jaunsāti, Irlava, and Viesāti.

== History ==
In the territory of present-day Zemīte Parish were historically located Grenči Manor (Gut Grenzhof/Grendsen, Grenči) and Zemīte Manor (Gut Samiten, Zemīte).

In 1935, Zemīte Parish covered an area of 90 km^{2} and had a population of 1,348. In 1945, Kukšas and Zemīte village councils were established in the parish, but the parish itself was abolished in 1949. In 1954, the abolished Kukšas village was added to Zemīte village. In 1965, the abolished Grenči village was added, while the territory of the kolkhoz “Zaļā zeme” was transferred to Abava village. In 1990, the village was reorganized into a parish. In 1997, Zemīte Parish was incorporated into the rural territory of Kandava, which in 1999 was reorganized into Kandava Municipality. In 2009, as a result of the administrative territorial reform, Zemīte Parish was re-established as a separate administrative unit within the municipality. Following the 2021 administrative territorial reform, Zemīte Parish was included in Tukums Municipality.

== Nature ==
Zemīte Parish is characterized by a mosaic of forests and agricultural land, as well as a slightly hilly landscape, particularly pronounced in the surroundings of Zemīte village. The highest point in the parish reaches 126 metres above sea level.

=== Hydrography ===
The Vēdzele River flows through the parish, forming a distinct valley in the centre of Zemīte. The Roja River, a tributary of the Abava, also originates in Zemīte Parish and flows through Grenči. The largest bodies of water in the parish are Plikšķi and Zivju ponds, as well as Zemīte Mill Lake.

== Population ==
=== Population changes ===
According to data from the CSP and OSP.

Population census

Year	Pop.	±% p.a.
1935	1,425	—
1959	1,345	−0.24%
1969	1,363	+0.13%
1979	1,179	−1.44%
1989	1,083	−0.85%
2000	1,045	−0.32%

Year	Pop.	±% p.a.
2011	792	−2.49%
2021	598	−2.77%
2024	569	−1.64%
2025	564	−0.88%
2026	548	−2.84%

=== Settlements ===
The largest settlements are Zemīte (the parish centre), Grenči, Klāvciems, and Laukmuiža.

== Economy ==
There are many farms in the parish. The main economic activities are grain farming, livestock farming, dairy farming, and beekeeping. Several forests owned by Latvian State Forests are located in the parish, as well as a number of local businesses. One of them is “Tēviņu mājas vīns,” which produces homemade wine.

=== Transport ===
The territory of the parish is crossed by the state regional roads P121 (Tukums — Zemīte — Kuldīga) and P109 (Kandava — Saldus). In the summer of 2024, a 900 m section of the P121 road in Zemīte was reconstructed, including the bridge over the Vēdzele River. At the same time, the road surface of the so-called “Zante road” (P109) was also upgraded, replacing the gravel surface with asphalt concrete. The construction of this road had been awaited for 45 years.

However, the P109 section from Zemīte to Kandava has not been renovated for more than 46 years, and local residents have repeatedly expressed dissatisfaction with its poor gravel surface. The responsible authorities have indicated that a reconstruction project has been developed, but funding has not yet been allocated. Latvian State Roads has announced that the road reconstruction could take place no later than 2027.

== Education and culture ==
=== Culture ===
Every year in July, the Grenči village festival is celebrated, while at the end of August the Zemīte Parish festival takes place, featuring concerts, theatre performances, and sports activities. In April, the nationwide “Great Cleanup” takes place, during which the parish territory is tidied. May 4 – the Restoration of Independence of the Republic of Latvia – is also celebrated; a garden bed for “bean planting” is prepared, and the day concludes with a communal gathering at a shared table. The summer solstice celebrations are held at the open-air stage, with active participation from local amateur groups. Lāčplēsis Day on November 11 is commemorated, and on November 18 a ceremonial concert “Latvia’s Birthday” is held.
