= Zemīte =

- Village
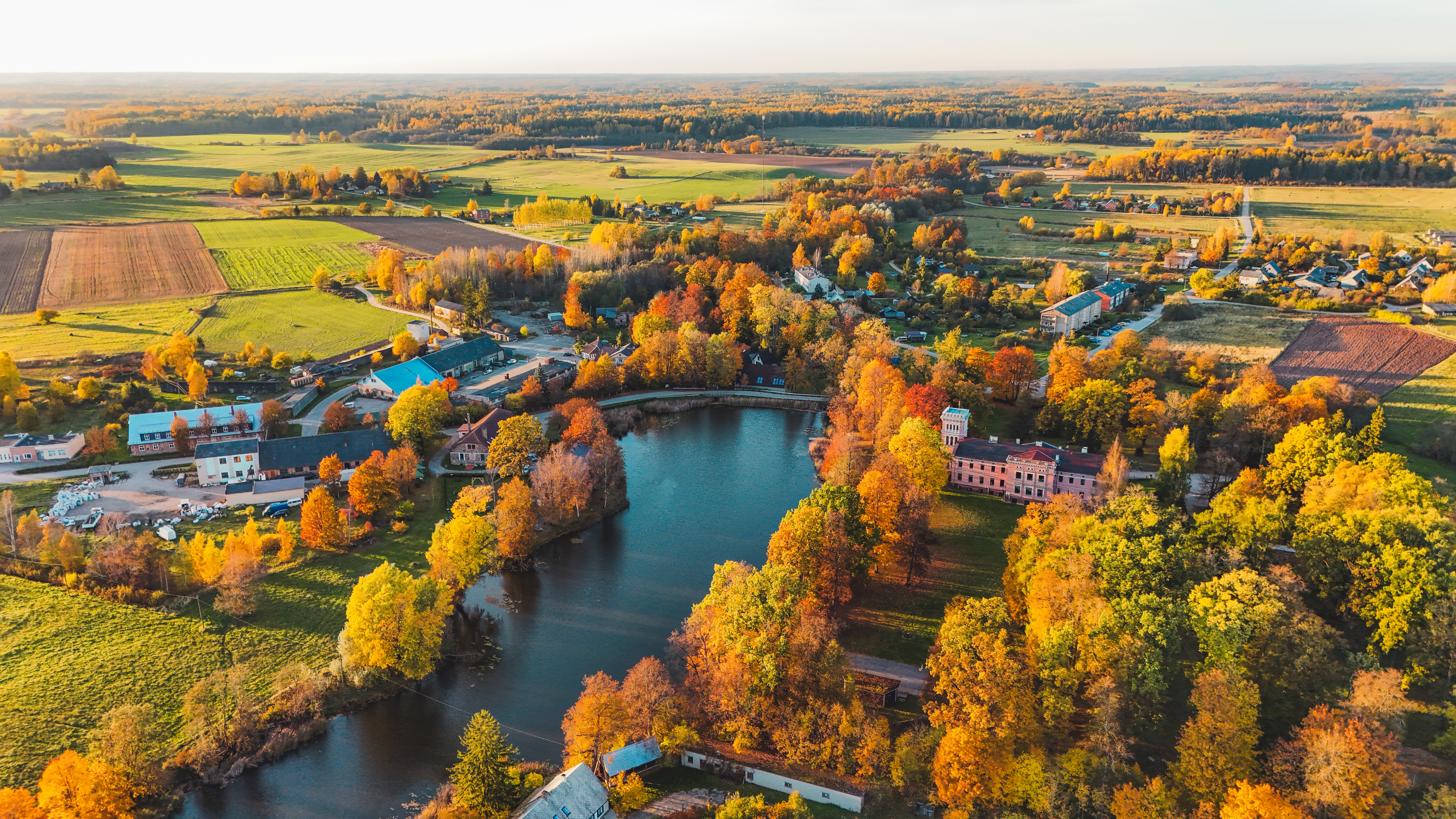

- Location in Latvia
- Coordinates: 56°55′42″N 22°47′40″E
- Country: Latvia
- Region: Courland
- Municipality: Tukums municipality
- Parish: Zemīte Parish

Population (2025)
  - Total: 158
- Time zone: UTC+2 (EET)
  - Summer (DST): UTC+3 (EEST)

Zemīte is a village in Latvia, Tukums Municipality, Zemīte Parish, and serves as the parish center. It is located in the northwestern part of the parish on the banks of the Vēdzele River, at the intersection of roads P109 and P121, 29 km from the municipal center of Tukums and 89 km from Riga. Zemīte is home to the parish administration, a kindergarten, a community center, a library, a post office, a shop, a Lutheran church, and the Birzite Nature Trail.

The settlement developed around the center of the former Zemīte Manor (Samiten). It expanded in the post-war years as a village serving the local village soviet and as the central settlement of the "Zemīte" kolkhoz. The Zemīte Lutheran Church, dating back to the 16th century, is an architectural monument of national significance, while its 17th-century altar is designated as an art monument. The Zemīte Manor complex—comprising the manor house (now housing a kindergarten), six servants' houses, a granary (now serving as the community center), a watermill, and a 9.2-hectare (23-acre) park featuring a giant elm with a circumference of 5.2 metres (17 ft)—consists of cultural-historical monuments of local significance.

== Demography ==
Historical population

Year	Pop.	±% p.a.
1970	209	—
1979	256	+2.28%
1989	297	+1.50%
2000	320	+0.68%
2011	237	−2.69%
2016	231	−0.51%
2017	226	−2.16%
2018	211	−6.64%

Year	Pop.	±% p.a.
2019	218	+3.32%
2020	215	−1.38%
2021	210	−2.33%
2022	201	−4.29%
2023	180	−10.45%
2024	182	+1.11%
2025	158	−13.19%

== Nature ==
The Vēdzele River flows through Zemīte, forming a lake in the village center. Beyond the lake, it carves out a small, hilly ancient valley. Notable large trees—the Zemīte Idol Linden (Elku Liepa) and the Sacrificial Oak (Upurozols)—grow near the local parsonage. The linden consists of eleven large trunks; there were reportedly as many as fourteen in the past, and they form a shape resembling an apse, with an opening facing the parsonage. The Sacrificial Oak has a circumference of approximately 4–5 meters (13-16 ft) and remains healthy and green. It is believed that the tree served a sacred function, though its history is not particularly ancient. The highest point in Zemīte is Pavārkalns Hill, located within the Pavārkalns Cemetery; it rises to an elevation of 106 meters above sea level (347 feet).

=== Highest hills ===
1. Pavārkalns Hill, 106 m.a.s.l. (347 feet)
2. Jaunzemju Hill, 100 m.a.s.l. (328 feet)
3. Northern Hill, 100 m.a.s.l. (328 feet)
4. Hill of Clouds, 99.9 m.a.s.l. (327 feet)
5. Hill of Rural Idol, 99 m.a.s.l. (324 feet)
6. Church Hill, 98 m.a.s.l. (321 feet)

The Birzite Nature Trail is located in Zemīte—700 meters from the center of the village and 200 meters from the Lutheran church. The trail is 1.2 km (0.75 miles) long and winds through a hilly forest known as Birzite. Hill of Clouds and Northern Hill are reachable by trail. It is recommended to visit the trail in late spring or early summer.

== Images ==
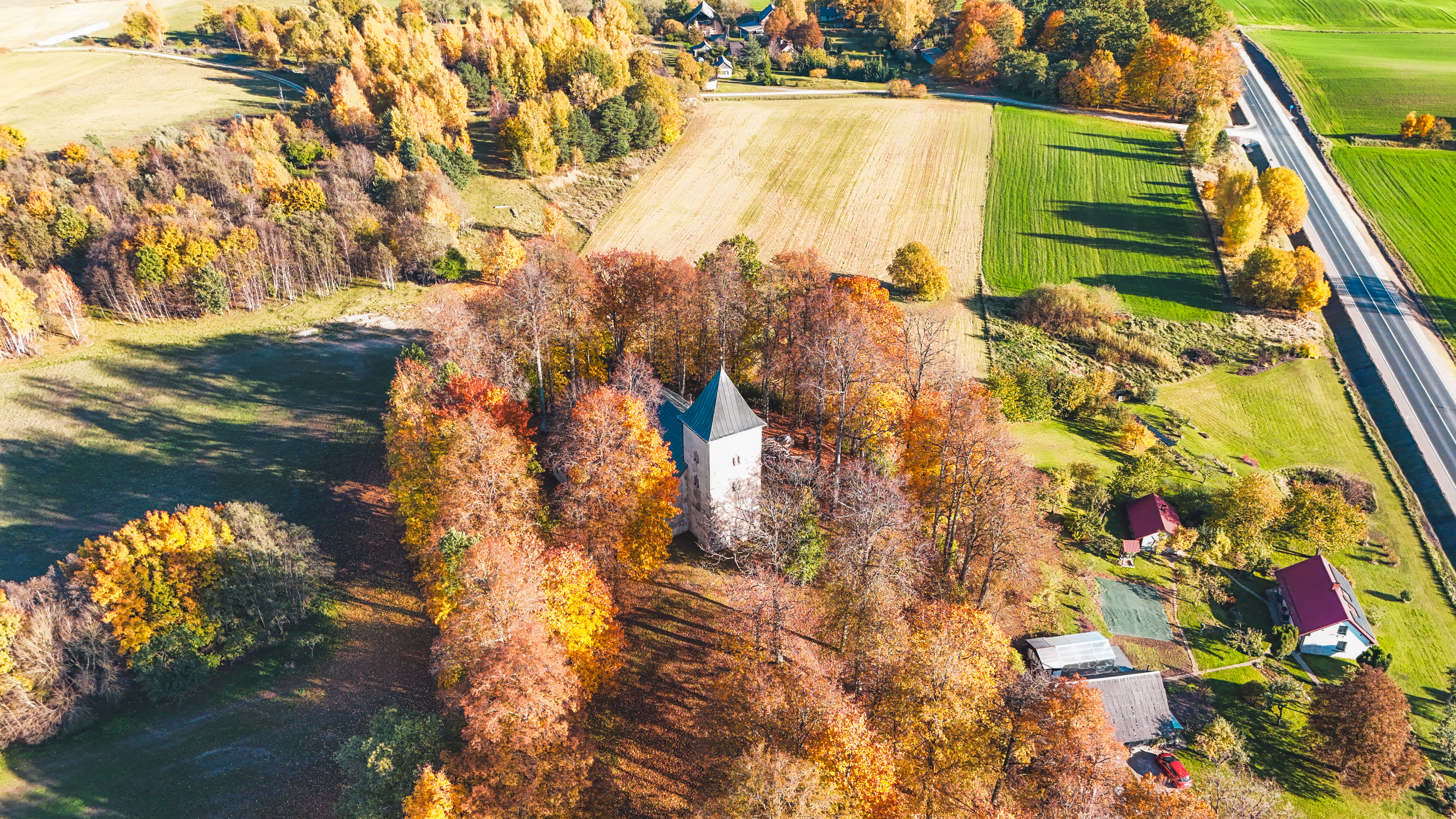
Zemite lutheran church in autumn from birds eyes view

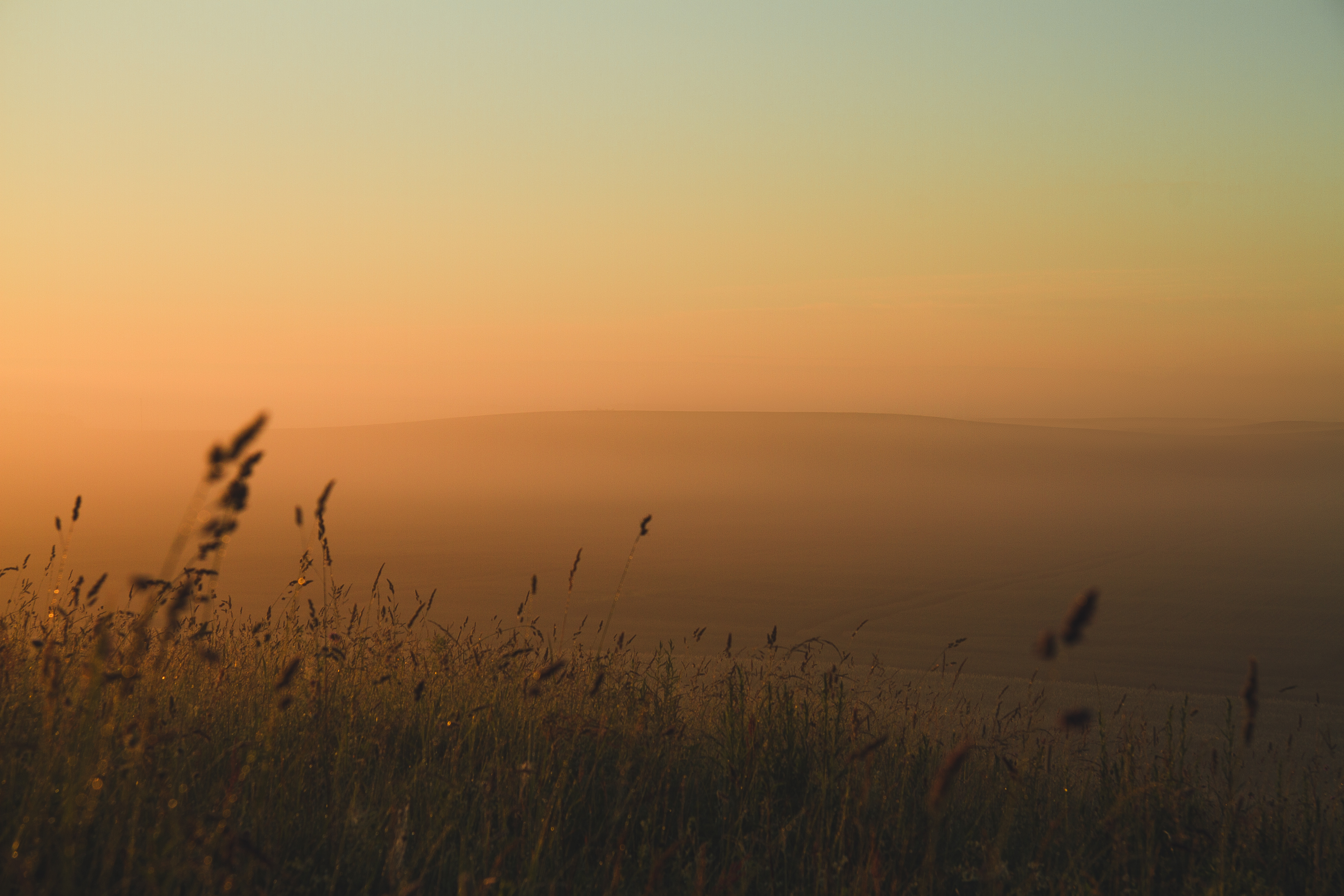
View to the Hill of Rural Idol from the Hill of Clouds

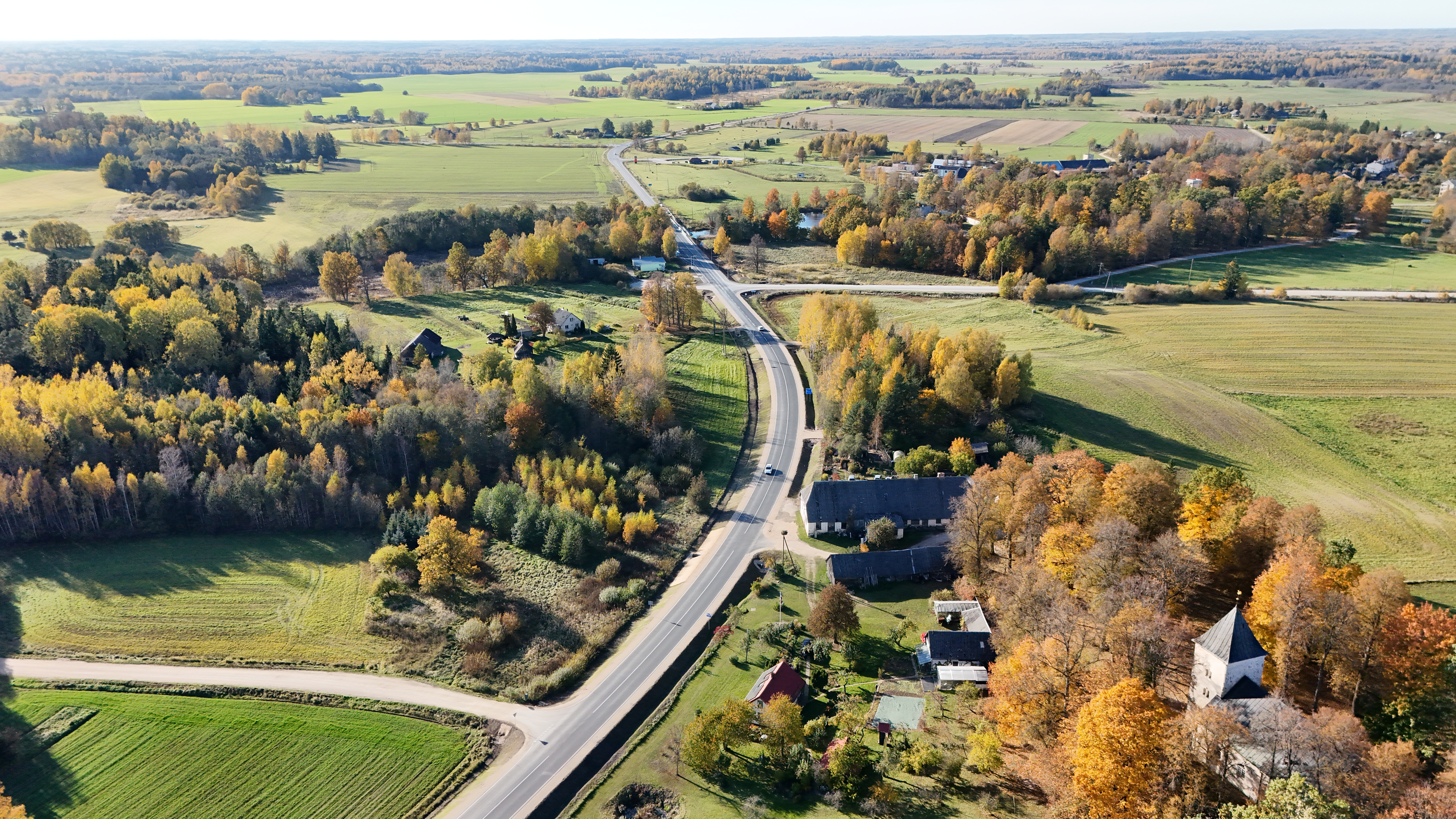
P121 road that goes through Zemīte

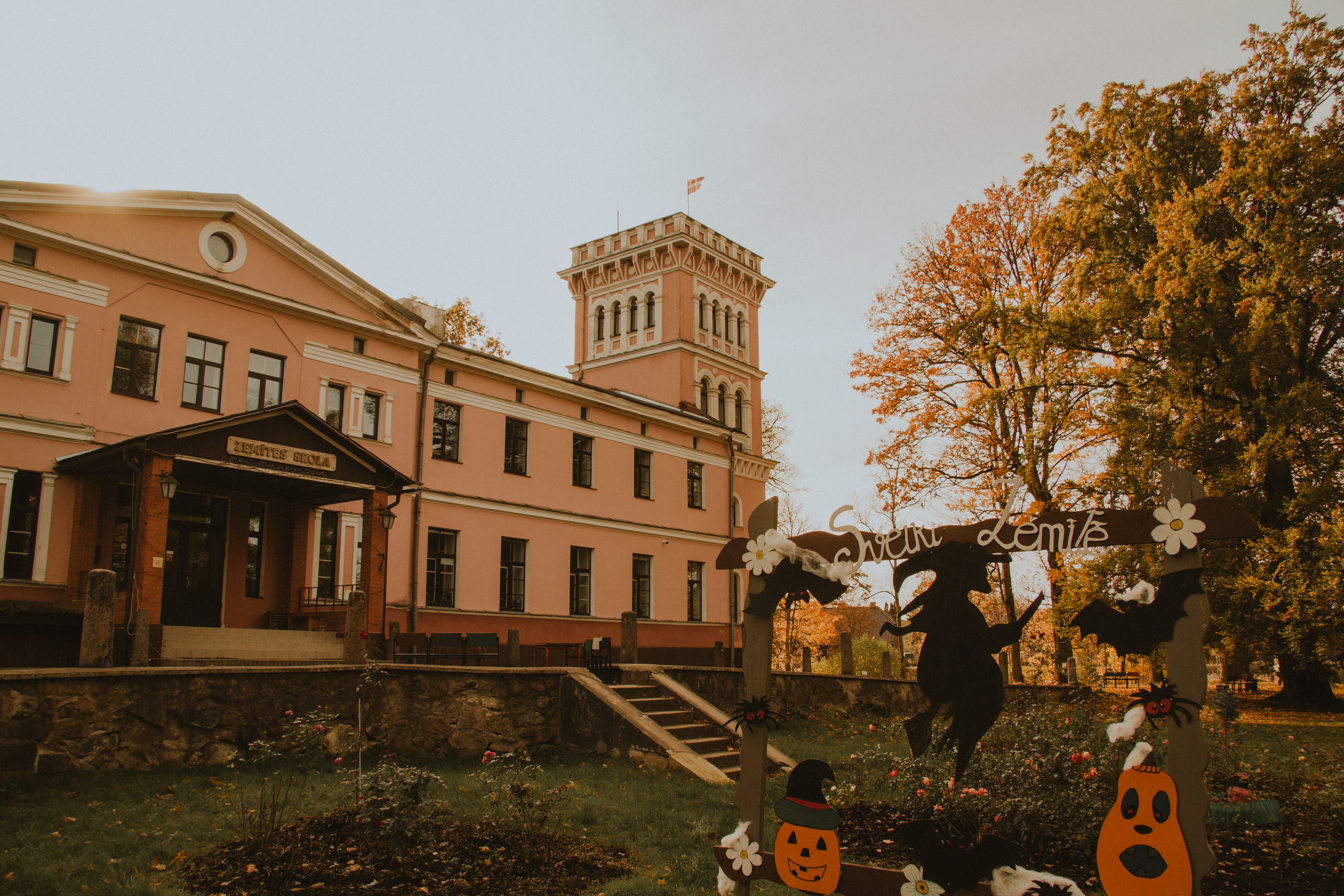
Zemīte Manor in autumn of 2024

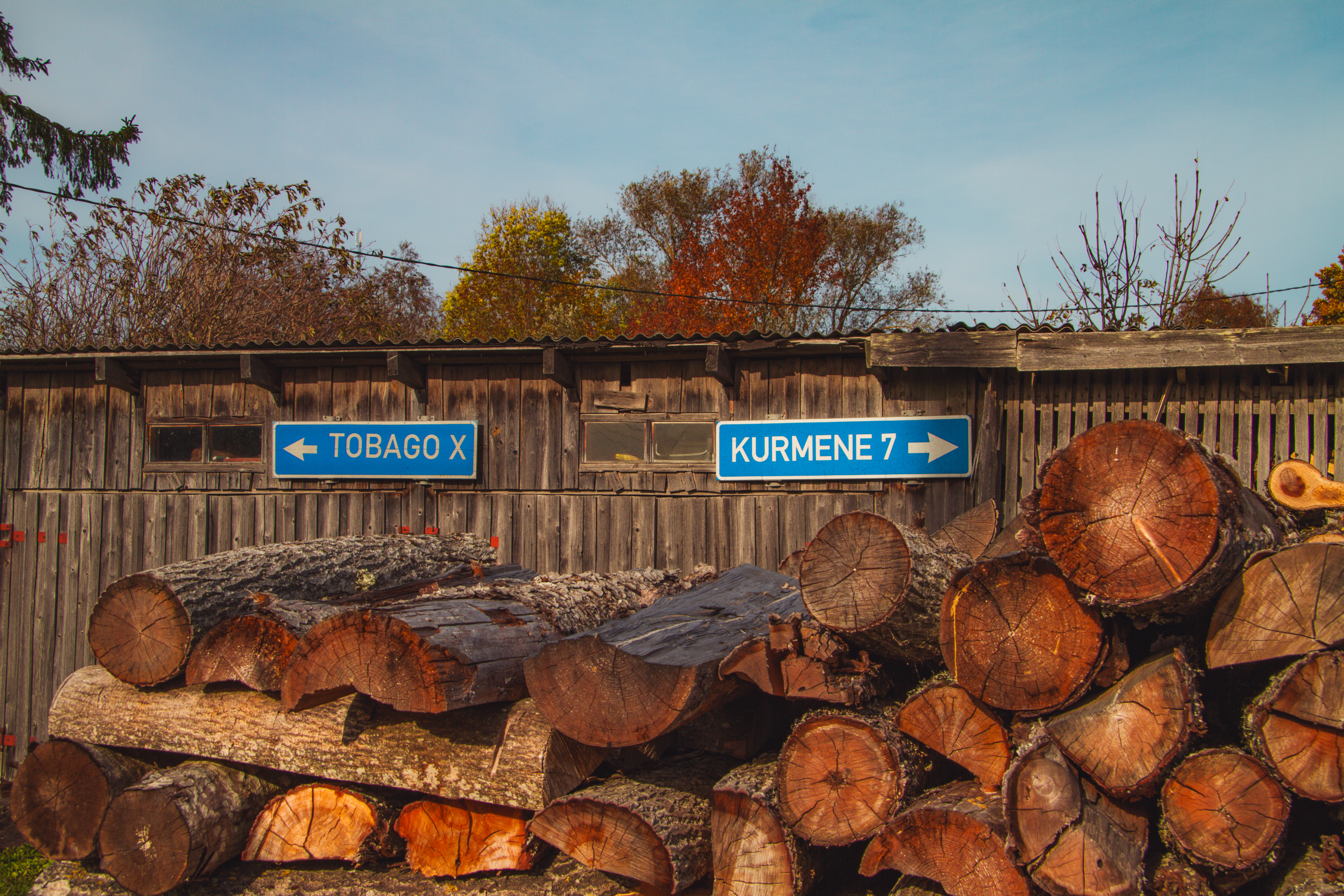
Road signs to "Tobago" and "Kurmene" in the center of Zemīte

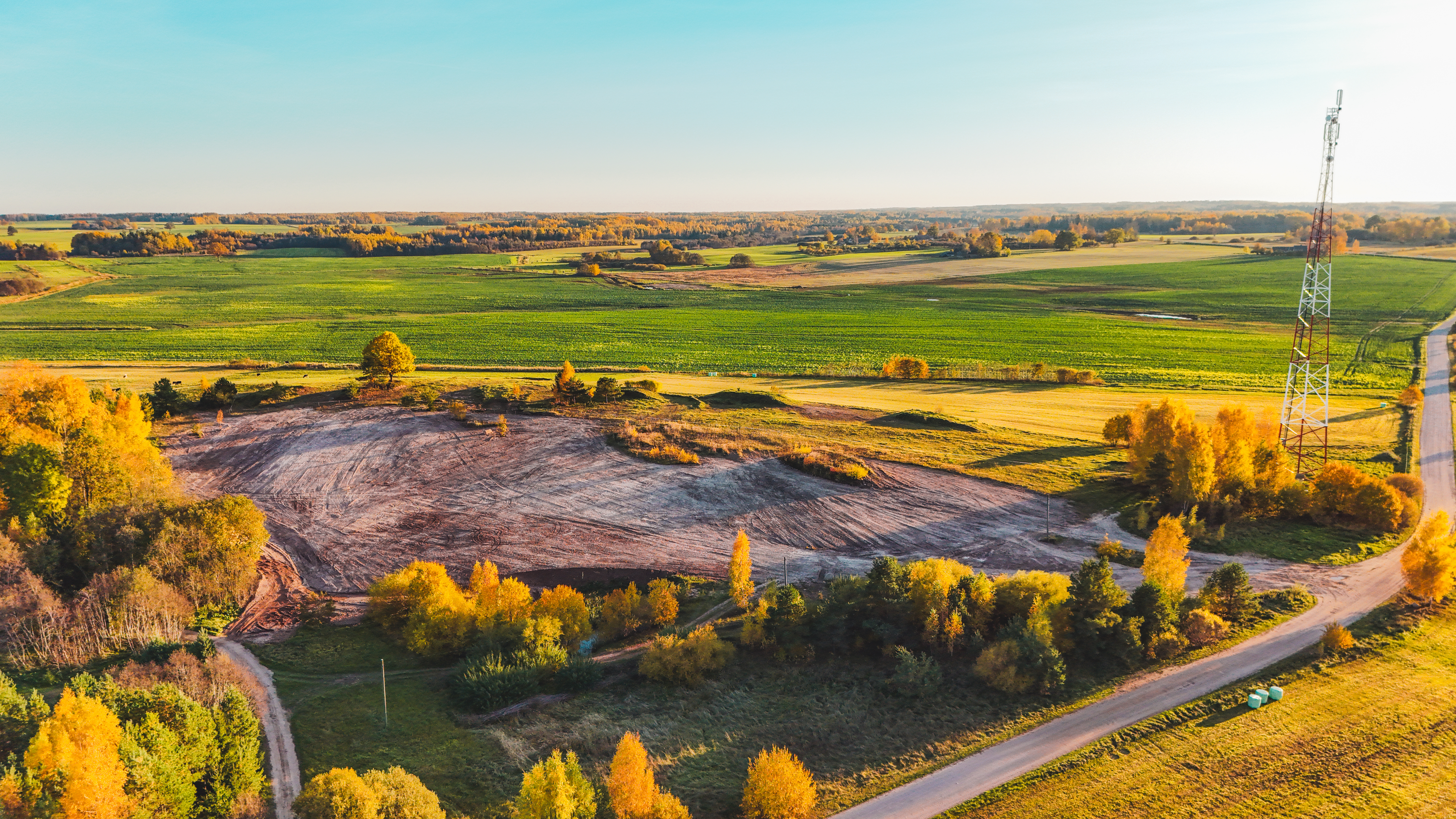
Jaunzemju Hill in autumn of 2024

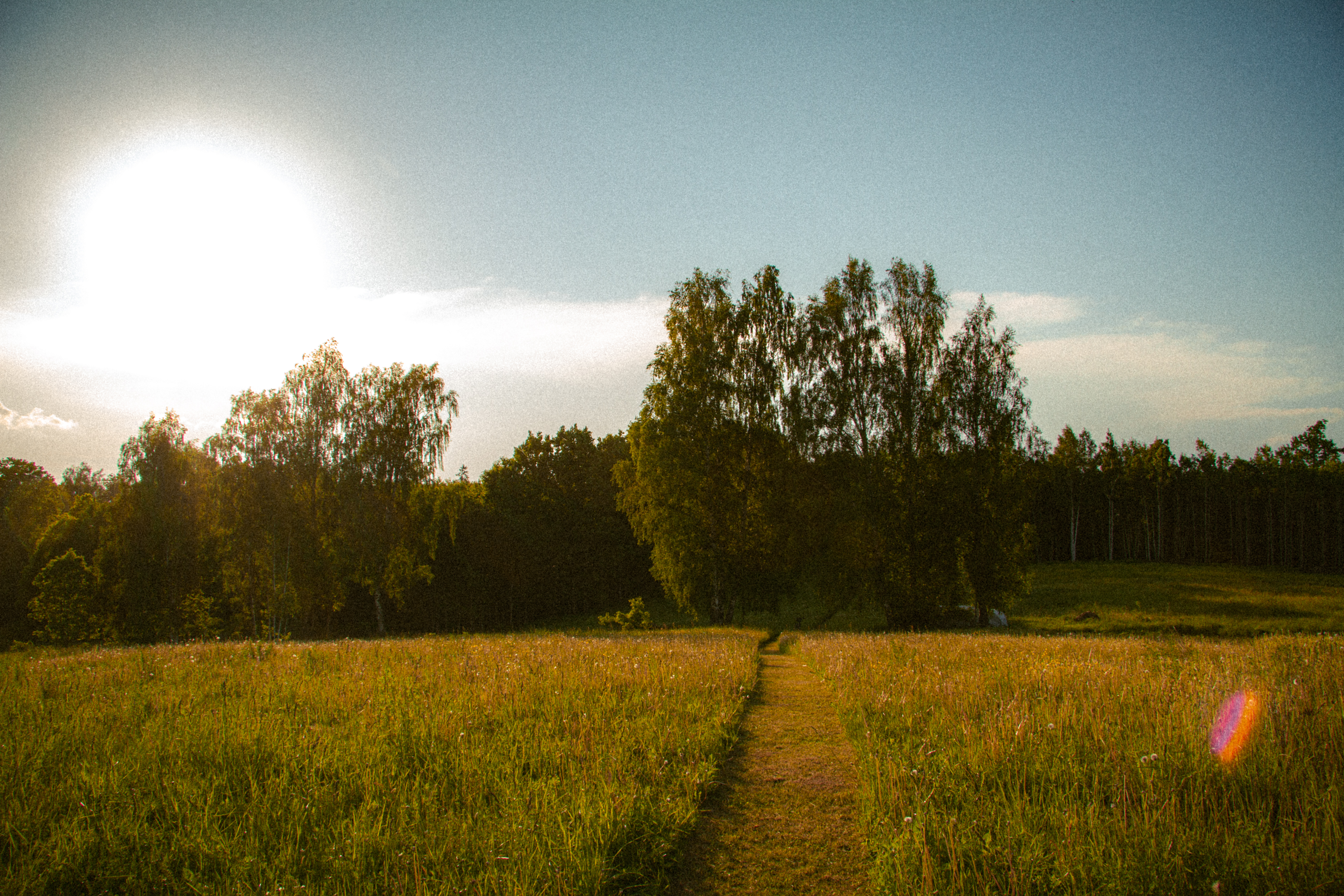
View to Birzite Nature Trail from the Hill of Clouds
