= Jaunpils Parish =

Parish in Tukums Municipality, Latvia

- parish of Latvia
- Coat of arms

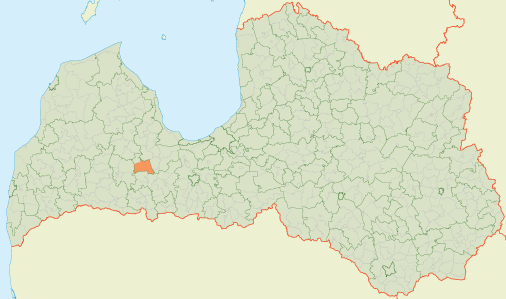
- Coordinates: 56°44′49″N 22°58′04″E
- Country: Latvia

Area
  - Total: 157.07 km^{2} (60.65 sq mi)

Population (1 January 2026)
  - Total: 1,738

Jaunpils Parish (Latvian: Jaunpils pagasts) is an administrative unit of Tukums Municipality in the Semigallia region of Latvia. The center of the parish is Jaunpils.

From 2009 to 2021, the parish (together with Viesati Parish) formed the Jaunpils Municipality, until it was merged into Tukums Municipality. It is the birthplace of Latvian scholar Krišjānis Barons and is home to Jaunpils Castle.

== Villages and settlements of Jaunpils Parish ==
- Jaunpils
- Strutele

== Gallery ==
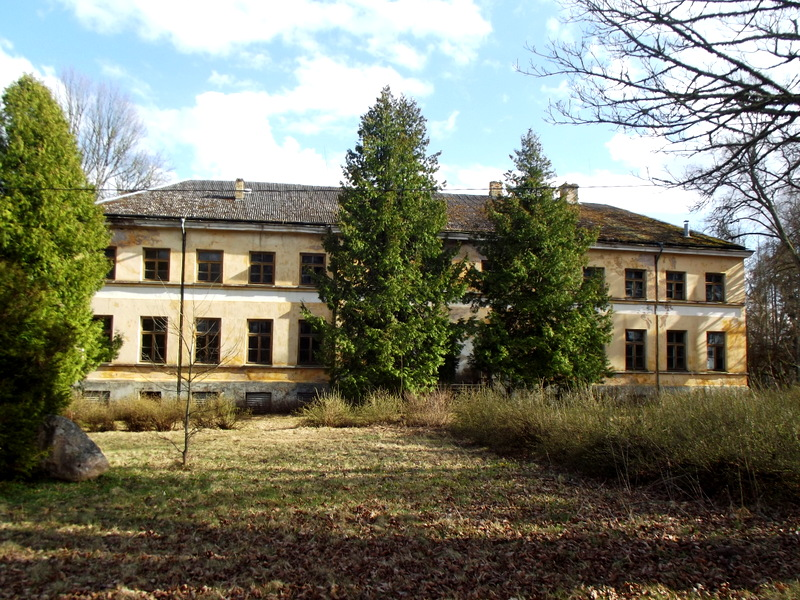
Strutele Manor (Struteles muiža)
