= Lamiņi Manor =

Manor house in Latvia

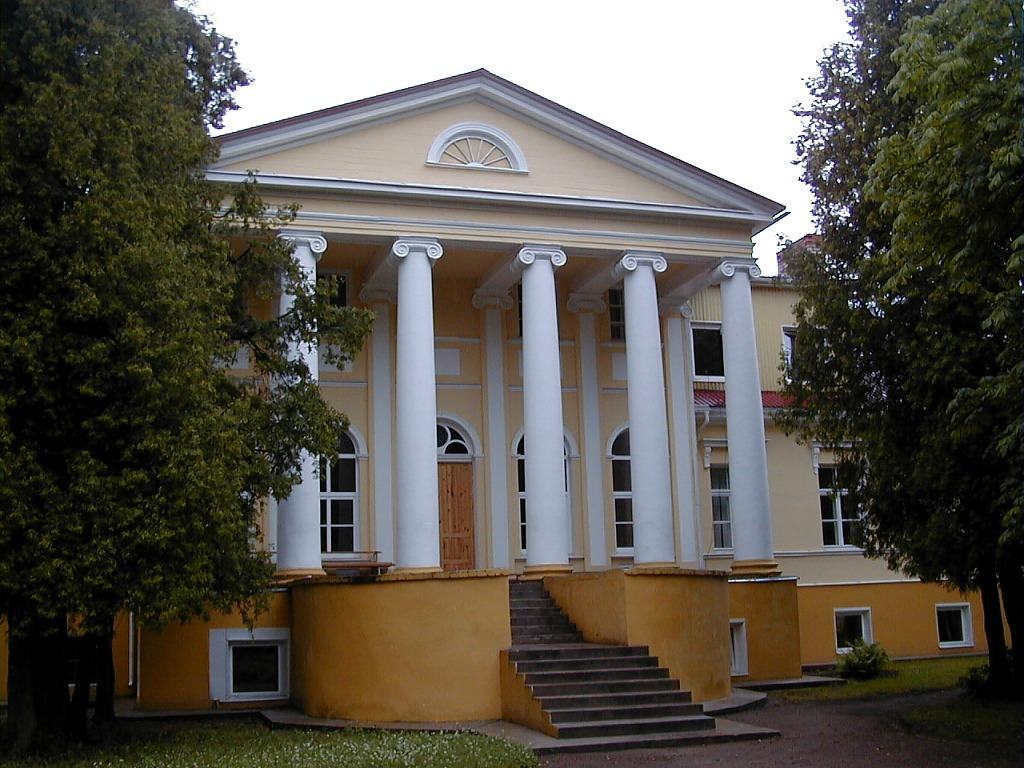

- Location within Latvia

General information
- Location: Lamiņi, Pūre Parish, Tukums Municipality, Courland, Latvia
- Coordinates: 57°05′56″N 22°57′36″E
- Construction started: 1855
- Completed: 1856

Lamiņi Manor (Latvian: Lamiņu muižas pils) is a manor house in Lamiņi, Pūre Parish, Tukums Municipality in the historical region of Courland, in western Latvia.

== History ==
Lamiņi Manor was built between 1855 and 1856. In the mid-19th century manor was acquired by Ferman, a merchant from Riga, and new manor master house was built. It currently houses the Dzirciems special boarding school.

== Manor park ==
At the same time when the construction of the new manor master house was going on, Ferman ordered creation of a new manor park with decoratively trimmed trees intertwined with pathways, flower beds, and decorative ponds. In 1912 Lamiņi Manor park was characterized as a rare example of Old French and Rococo style park in the Baltics.

== See also ==
- List of palaces and manor houses in Latvia
