= Jaunmokas Manor =

Manor house in Latvia

Coordinates: 56.9816°N 23.0540°E

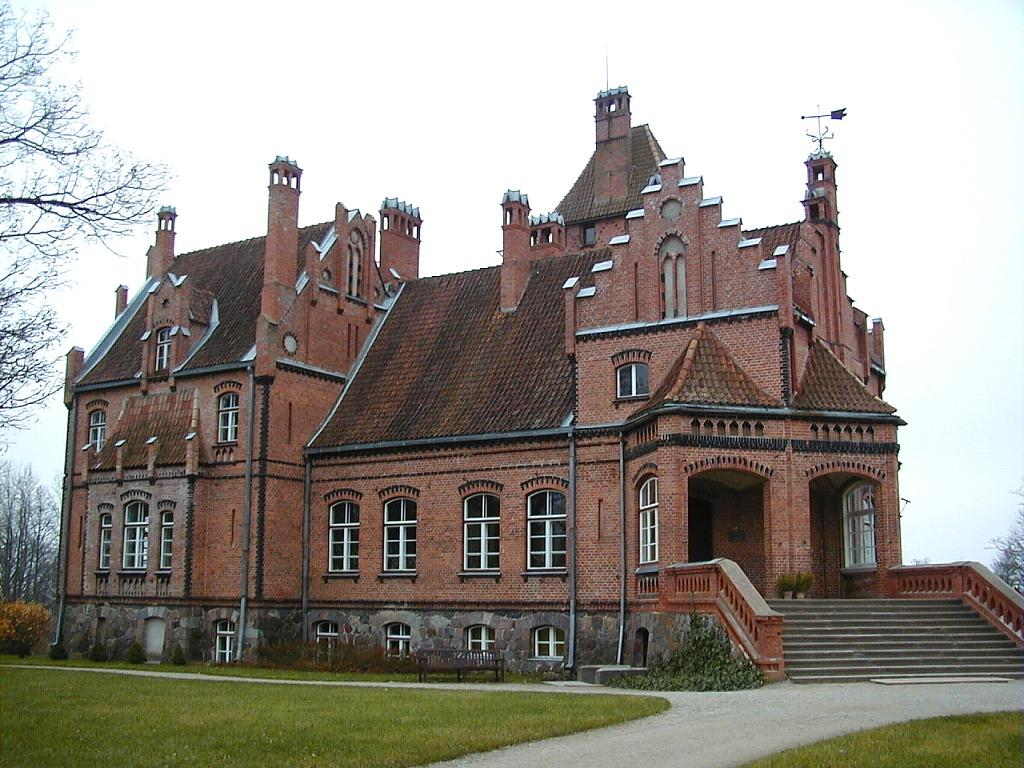
- Interactive map of the Jaunmokas Manor area

General information
- Architectural style: Neo-Gothic
- Location: Tukums municipality, Latvia
- Completed: 1901
- Client: George Armitstead

Design and construction
- Architect: Wilhelm Bockslaff

Jaunmokas Manor (Latvian: Jaunmoku pils; German: Schloss Neu-Mocken) is a manor house in the Tume Parish of Tukums Municipality in the Courland region of Latvia. Since 1991 the building has housed a woods and forestry museum, exhibiting the respective techniques and the history of forestry in the country.

== History ==
The estate known as Jaunmokas was first mentioned in documents in 1544. The Neo-Gothic style structure with Art Nouveau elements was designed by architect Wilhelm Ludwig Nicholas Bockslaff (1858-1945), and built in 1901 as a hunting lodge for Mayor of Riga George Armitstead (1847-1912).

George Armitstead owned the manor until 1904 when it was sold to the Brinken family. In 1910 it was again sold and became property of the von Ungern-Sternberg family who owned the manor until 1918.

During Latvian agrarian reforms in the 1920s the manor was nationalized and its lands partitioned. In 1926 a children's sanatorium was established in the manor building. During World War II a military hospital of the Wehrmacht was located in the building. During the Latvian SSR there were several offices and flats located in the building. In 1976 the building was taken over by the Ministry of Forestry and Forest Industry and major restoration works started and as a result in 1989 the manor was turned into a museum.

== See also ==
- List of palaces and manor houses in Latvia
