= Jaunpils Castle =

Castle in Tukums Municipality, Latvia

- Jaunpils pils
- Jaunpils, Tukums Municipality, Semigallia, Latvia
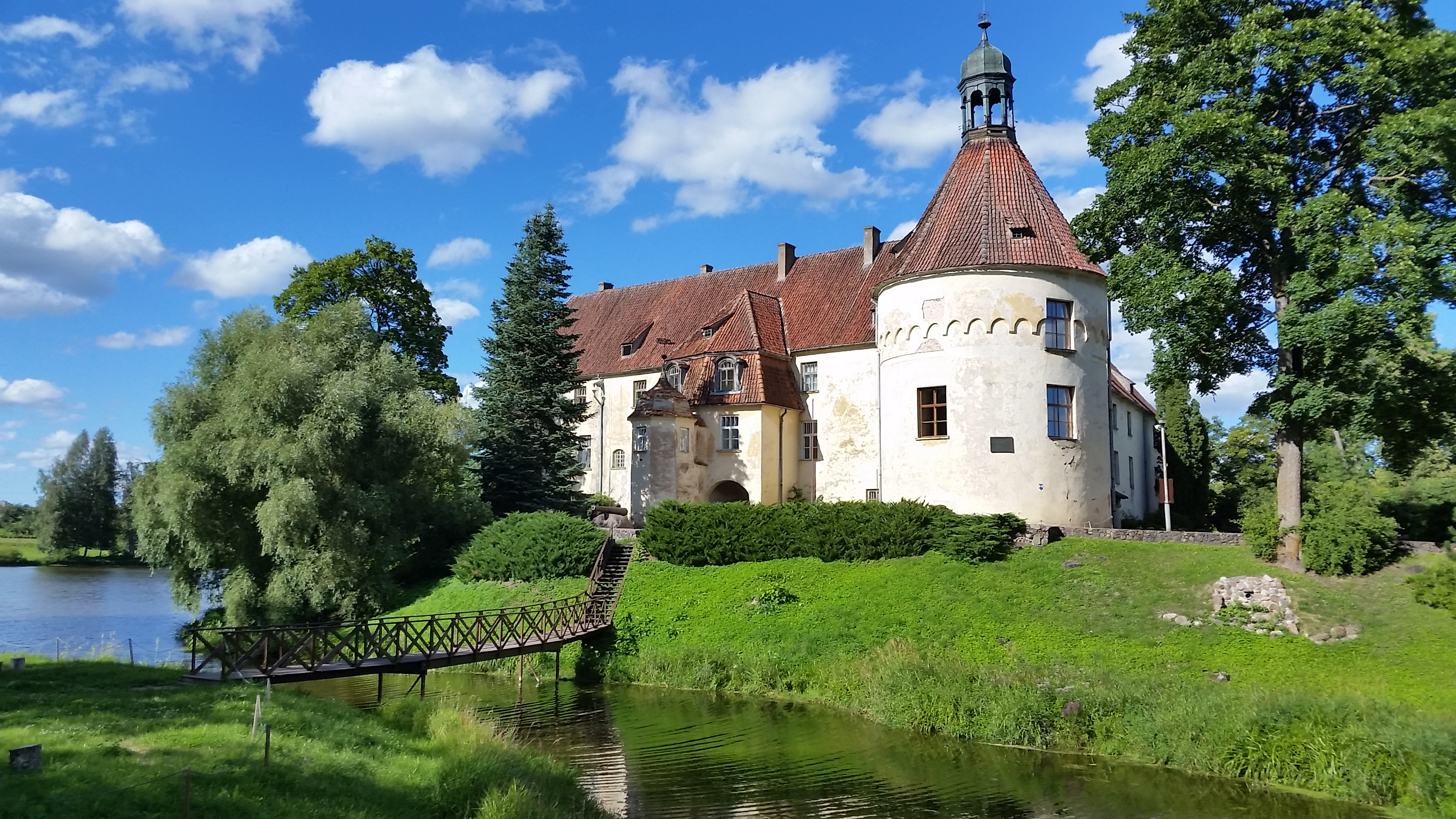

Site information
- Condition: Preserved

Location
- Coordinates: 56°43′50″N 23°01′16″E

Site history
- Built: End of the 14th. century
- Built by: Livonian Order

Jaunpils Castle (Latvian: Jaunpils pils; German: Schloß Neuenburg) is a castle in Jaunpils Parish, Tukums Municipality in the Semigallia region of Latvia. More of a manor house than properly a fortified castle, it has now been converted into a hotel.

== History ==
The castle in Jaunpils is first time mentioned in 1411. Most likely it's built in the end of the 14th century. The tower was added in the 15th century. In the first half of 16th century Jaunpils Castle was the place where many old and weak brothers of Livonian Order settled. In 1576 Jaunpils Castle became property of last komtur of Dobele Matthias von der Recke. Castle was owned by his descendants until 1920. The castle was heavily damaged in war by Swedes in 1625. Later a third floor was added and the old fortress became a manor with all conveniences in the end of the 17th century. The building was partly reconstructed in the 18th century. The castle was burned down during the Russian Revolution of 1905. A year later it was rebuilt by architect Wilhelm Bockslaff.

From the 16th century until 1920 the castle belonged to the family of the Baltic German baron von der Recke. One of the family members who lived there in the 18th century was the poet Elisa von der Recke. After the Latvian agrarian reforms of the 1920s, the castle complex housed a cattle-breeding experimental station. During the Soviet occupation of Latvia, the interior of the castle was heavily reconstructed and for many years had typical Soviet interiors from the 1960s. In the 2000s, a team of Latvian designers refitted the interior of the castle. Today it features luxurious medieval style apartments which blend luxuries with glimpses of the castle's history.

The castle tower and the shield of the former owners - the von der Recke family - are featured in the coat of arms of Jaunpils Parish.

== See also ==
- List of castles in Latvia
