= Kaive Oak =

Remarkable oak in Latvia

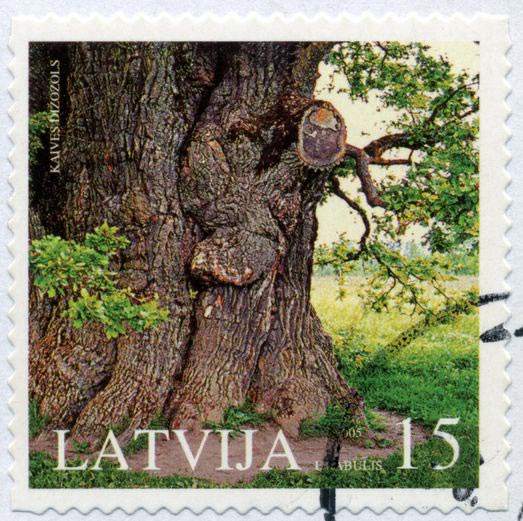
- Latvia postal stamp with Kaive Oak.

- Location within Latvia
- Location: Latvia
- Nearest city: Tukums
- Coordinates: 57°3′51.5″N 23°1′31.9″E

The Kaive Oak (Latvian: Kaives ozols) is an oak tree (Quercus robur) in Sēme Parish, Tukums Municipality, Latvia. It is situated about 500 m from Kaive Manor, in a meadow. It is protected as a natural monument in Latvia.

Perimeter: 10.4 m, height: 18.0 m, projection of the crown: 250 m², length of branches: up to 13.7 m.

It is the thickest tree in Latvia and in all Baltic States.

== History ==
Natural Monument Researcher Guntis Eniņš claims that Kaive Oak is almost 400 years old, not 800–1000 years, as claimed in some sources, based on the 3 mm tree annual or 2.5 cm average annual increase in stem thickness. In 1920s during agrarian reform in Latvia land of Kaive Manor was divided into 32 farms. Land with the Kaive oak become the property of J. Stroman, who named his farm the Senči (Ancestors)." Lightning struck at the top of the tree in the 1920s, leaving on oak only one large branch. The first publication in the press about this oak is in Nedēļa (Week) magazine on October 30, 1924:

"A giant oak, called Senči Oak, is located in Kaive Manor of the Seme Parish, in the young farm of J. Stroman, 13 km from Tukums, in a mountainous area. Separate large oaks scattered around Senči indicate that there was once an oak forest and, in any case, an ancient site of sacrifice. Oak 28 feet (8.5 m) in circumference. In the middle, there is an empty hole in one side, but it gradually grows closed. Oak still in full green. According to people, there was once a monastery in the nearby Kaive Manor, which was destroyed during the Swedish War. At that time 3 barrels of gold were stored under the oak roots. Due to these stories, we have recently seen "searchers" around the roots of an oak tree, but the roots have grown solid like a cast iron cover."

Eniņš, however, rejects the possibility that such a great oak could have grown in the woods and that the landlord's fields could have been an "ancient site of sacrifice."
