= Church of the Cross (disambiguation) =

Church of the Cross may refer to:

- Church of the Cross, a historic church on Calhoun Street in Bluffton, South Carolina.
- Church of the Cross, in Norwegian: Korskirken, a Church of the Church of Norway in Bergen, Norway.
- Church of the Cross, in German: Kreuzkirche, Dresden, a Church of the Evangelical Church in Germany in Dresden, Germany.
- Church of the Cross, Oslo (Norwegian: Korskirken), a former, small, Medieval parish church (Roman Catholic) in the Old Town of Oslo, Norway, now a ruin.
- Church of the Cross, Riga (Latvian: Krusta Evaņģēliski luteriskā baznīca), a Lutheran church in Riga, Latvia.
- Ristinkirkko, (English: Church of the Cross), the main church in Lahti, Finland, designed by Alvar Aalto
