= Zentene Parish =

Parish of Latvia

- parish of Latvia
- Coat of arms

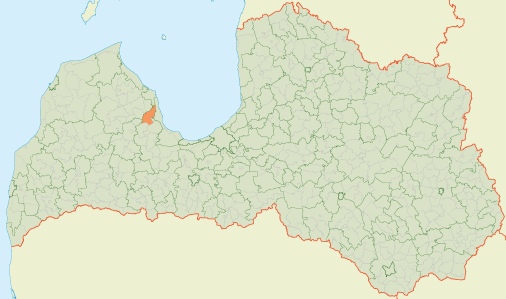
- Coordinates: 57°09′35″N 23°02′11″E
- Country: Latvia

Population (1 January 2026)
  - Total: 461

Zentene Parish (Latvian: Zentenes pagasts) is an administrative unit of Tukums Municipality in the Courland region of Latvia. It is also the area in which Viktor Tsoi was killed in a car accident in August of 1990.

== Towns, villages and settlements of Zentene parish ==
- Dumpiete
- Dzirciems
- Jaunpļavas
- Rindzele
- Zentene
