= Oskars Dankers =

Latvian general

- Dankers
- Born: March 26, 1883; Irlava parish, Russian Empire
- Died: April 11, 1965 (aged 82); Grand Rapids, United States
- Military career
- Service years: 1902–1916 (Russia); 1919–1940 (Latvia)
- Rank: Lieutenant Colonel (Russia); General (Latvia)
- Wars: World War I; Latvian War of Independence
- Awards: Order of Lāčplēsis (II and III class)
- Other work: politician

Oskars Dankers (March 26, 1883 – April 11, 1965) was a Latvian general. He participated in World War I and in the Latvian War of Independence. He was a recipient of the Order of Lāčplēsis, 2nd and 3rd class. During the occupation of Latvia by Nazi Germany, Dankers was appointed head of the German-controlled Latvian Self-Government.

== Biography ==
He was born in Irlava parish, Courland Governorate, Russian Empire. The first education he received was in Jelgava, where he studied at the Alexander School. He continued his education in Jelgavas Realschule and graduated in 1902. Dankers joined the 180th infantry regiment of the Russian Imperial Army, which was deployed in Jelgava. He graduated from the Vilnius Military Academy in 1906 and continued service in the 197th infantry regiment of the Russian Army, deployed near Helsinki. In 1913 Dankers received the rank of Stabskapitän.

Dankers participated in World War I with the 197th infantry regiment. He initially commanded a company, and later a battalion. On February 4, 1916, he was promoted to the rank of podpolkovnik (Lt. colonel). During his service, Dankers was shell-shocked and was wounded several times. Dankers was repeatedly awarded decorations. He was captured by the enemy in July 1916 and was released in 1918. He returned to Helsinki and remained there until May 1919.

On May 31, 1919, he joined the Latvian Army in Tallinn, Estonia. He started as an officer of special tasks at the headquarters of Jorģis Zemitāns and participated in the formation of new Latvian troops. In June, he became a commander of the 3rd Jelgava Infantry Regiment (soon afterwards, the regiment was recalled to the 7th Sigulda Infantry Regiment). He and his troops were transported via the Baltic Sea to Liepāja in Latvia, where in August, he was appointed commander to the highest Latvian troop in Liepāja. In battles of November 1919, he defended Liepāja against the Bermontian Army. Later that month, he was promoted to colonel. At the end of 1919 Dankers became commander of the 4th Zemgale Infantry Division. Serving as a commander in the Zemgale Division, he participated in several battles at the Latgale front. On June 22, 1926, he was promoted to general. After the Latvian War of Independence, he continued his military education. He was commander of the Zemgale Division until 1933. Afterwards, he commanded the 1st Kurzeme Infantry Division.

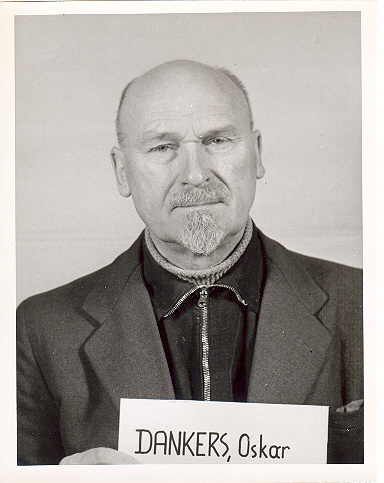
Oskars Dankers at the Nuremberg Trials

In January 1940, he left the post as commander of Kurzeme Division and in June (two days after the Soviet occupation), he went to Germany with his family. When Germany initiated war with the USSR in 1941, he returned to (Reichskommissariat Ostland), Latvia, where he held several high posts in the German-made Latvian Self-Administration. In September 1944 he and his family left Latvia for Germany, where he was interned in 1945 by the United States forces. He was the subject of suspicions because of his posts in German occupation institutions, however, there was no evidence of war crimes. After his release in 1947, he lived in an UNRRA displaced persons camp in Germany. In the 1950s, Dankers lost his eyesight. In 1957, he moved – this time to United States – where he published two books about his life. He died in Grand Rapids, Michigan on April 11, 1965.

== See also ==
- List of Latvian Army generals
