= Baiba Sipeniece-Gavare =

Latvian actress (born 1970)

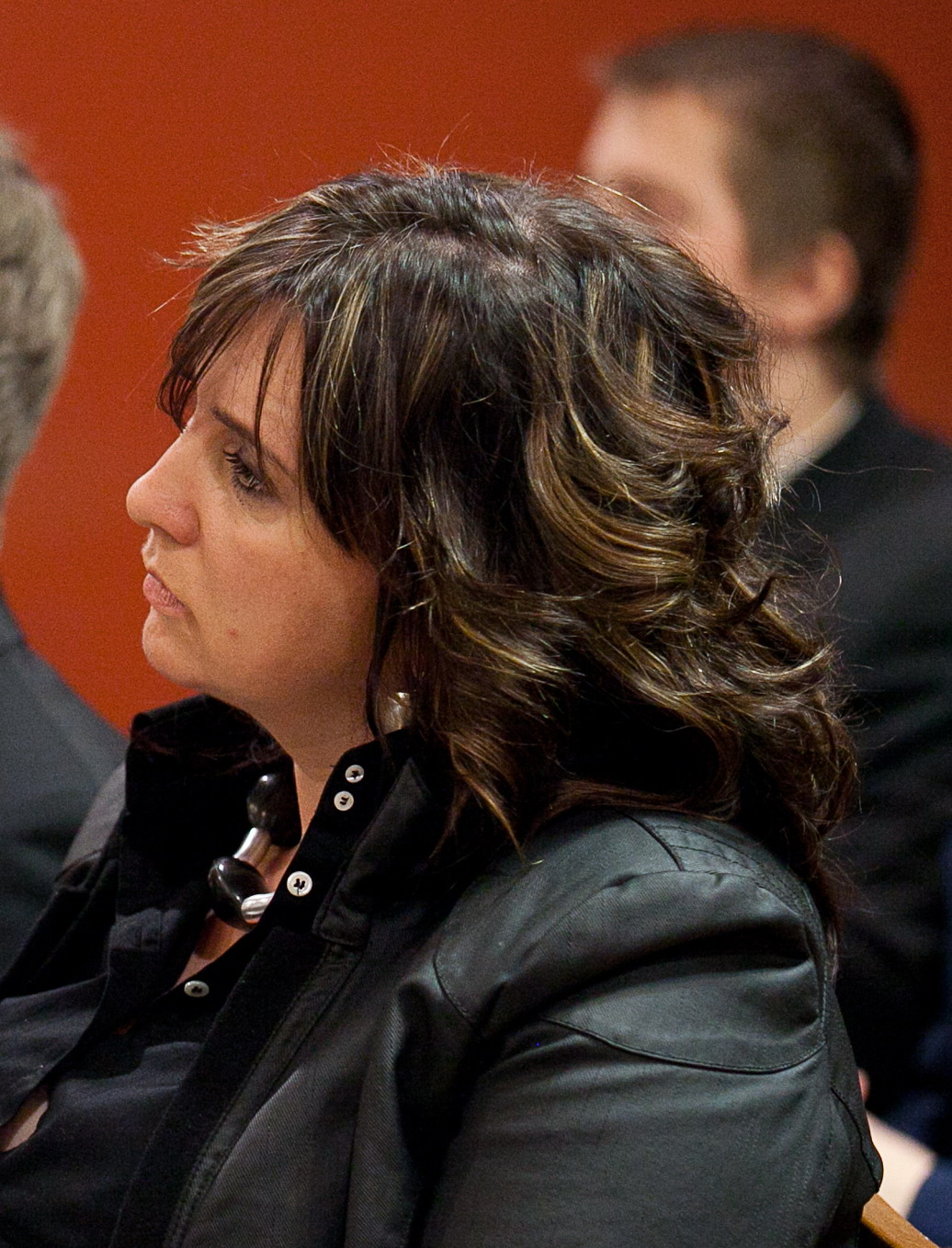
- Born: Baiba Sipeniece; 21 February 1970 (age 56); Jaunpils, Latvia
- Occupations: Actress; humorist; television presenter; radio presenter; event manager
- Spouse: Gatis Gavars
- Children: 2

Baiba Sipeniece-Gavare (born 21 February 1970) is a Latvian humorist, actress, television and radio presenter, and event manager.

== Life and career ==
Baiba Sipeniece was born on 21 February 1970 in Jaunpils.

Sipniece-Gavare studied at Jaunpils secondary school and Valmiera Viestura secondary school. Having participated in various TV projects and films, Sipeniece-Gavare has acted in several comedy shows, including "Lielais Brīnumzeme shovs", and "Ādamsoni". In 2005, Sipniece-Gavare played one of the main roles in the film "Es mīlu jūsu meitu!". She has also hosted several TV programs, including TV3 shows "Dziesmu Duelis", "Lielais Brīnumzemes šovs", "Dullais desmetnieks", "Dziedi ar zvezteņi. Milžu cīņa", "Dejo nost", "Saimnieks šerki sievu" and "Sanāciet, sadziediet!". Sipeniece-Gavare also hosts several radio programs, including the Star FM program "Zoopasta". She has hosted the Latvian Music Recordings of the Year Award several times, usually together with Valters Krauzis. She currently hosts the YouTube program "Sviests manā galvā."

== Personal life ==
Sipniece-Gavare is married to architect Gatis Gavars, and they have two daughters.
