= Taurupe Parish =

Parish of Latvia

- parish of Latvia
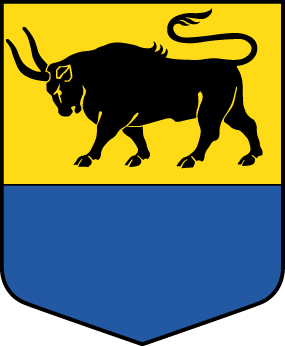
- Coat of arms

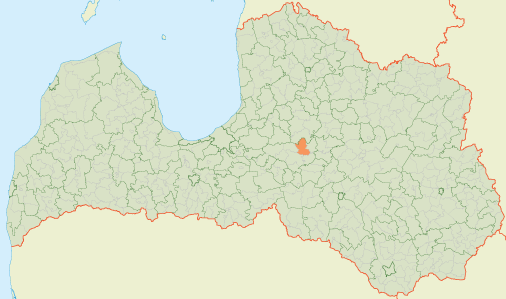
- Coordinates: 56°54′13″N 25°19′08″E
- Country: Latvia

Population (1 January 2026)
  - Total: 645

Taurupe Parish (Latvian: Taurupes pagasts) is an administrative unit of Ogre Municipality in the Vidzeme region of Latvia. Its center is the village of Taurupe, located near Taurupe Manor. Before 1925, the parish was called Aderkaši Parish.

== Villages and settlements of Taurupe Parish ==
- Taurupe
- Aderkaši
- Bevulēni
- Zvaigznītes
- Dreimaņi
- Lakstene
