= Zemīte Manor =

Manor house in Latvia

- Semigallia, Latvia
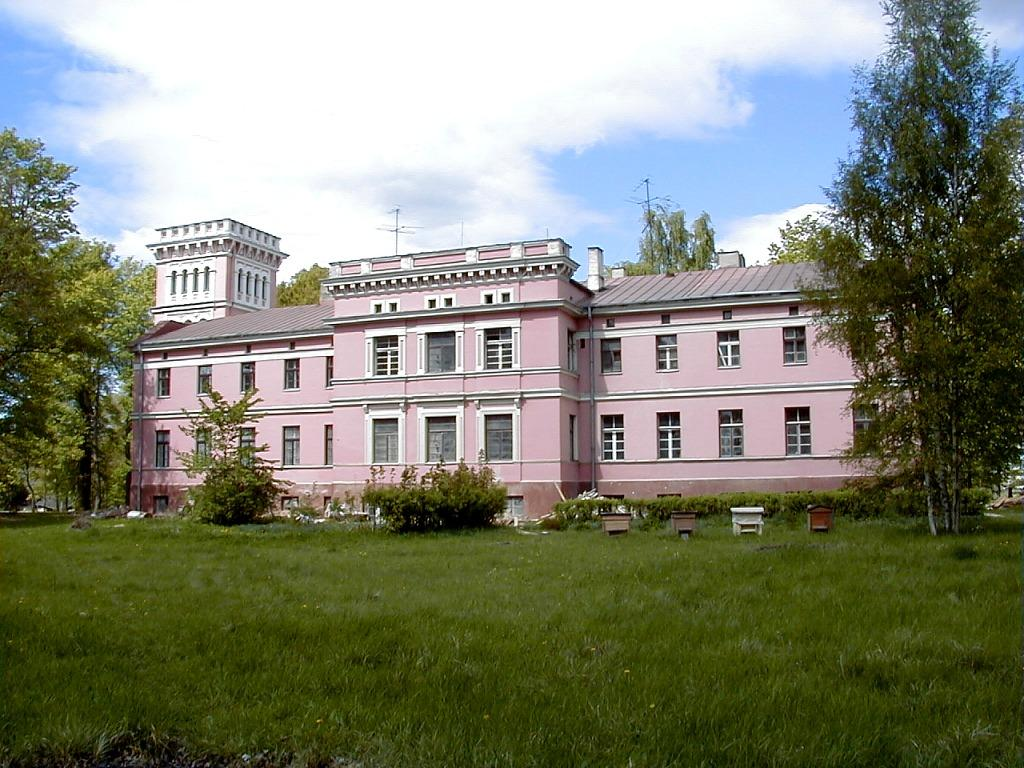

Site information
- Type: Manor

Location
- Coordinates: 56°55′40.07″N 22°47′40.89″E

Zemīte Manor (Latvian: Zemītes muižas pils) is a manor house in Zemīte, Zemīte Parish, Tukums Municipality in the Courland region of Latvia. Damaged by fire both in 1905 and 1931, the structure was repaired each time. It currently houses the Zemīte primary school.

== History ==
Zemīte Manor (or Knight's Manor) was known since 1437 as an estate of Štekmest and later on of von Butlar. The Butlar family owned estate until 1673, after which the owners were von Lebel, von Mirbach, von Plettenberg and von Berrie. From 1790 to 1920 manor belonged to von Fircks family. The manor house was built in the Biedermeier era of spectacular construction forms around 1850. At the same time the park around it was also created. Later in the 19th century, a square tower of Neo-Renaissance style, whose sole function was to confirm the owner of the building, was additionally built. Manor house was burned in 1905 and shortly thereafter restored. Then it was burned again in 1931 and once again restored. Consequently, the original interior decoration of the building has not survived.

In 1937, in the old granary of the manor, was in the Guard House. In 1943 several manor houses were burnt down. In 1945, the Zemīte Manor established a Car and Horse Leasing Point, and an executive committee of the Zemīte Parish Workers' Deputies Council had it headquarter. In the former Guard House was established the Machine and Tractor Station. In 1951 the station was liquidated and handed over to Kandava RTU, and in 1962 a new company was established on the basis of it - the Tukuma Lauktehnikas branch. During the Soviet era, the palace housed a cafeteria and apartments. The idea at that time was to build a museum in the castle tower.

== Modern era ==
The former mansion is now municipal property. In 2000, the Kandava Regional Council invested in its reconstruction and since then Zemīte Elementary School is in the palace. On September 1, 2000, with the participation of President Vaira Vike-Freiberga, the school moved to these beautiful premises. On September 22, 2018, Zemīte School celebrated its 170th birthday.

== Local legends ==
It is said that at midnight in Zemīte Manor one can meet the Blue Lady. In Zemīte Manor Park the face of the Park Guard is carved on the linden tree trunk and the Lover's chair as well.

== See also ==
- List of palaces and manor houses in Latvia
