= Vecbebri Manor =

Manor house in Latvia

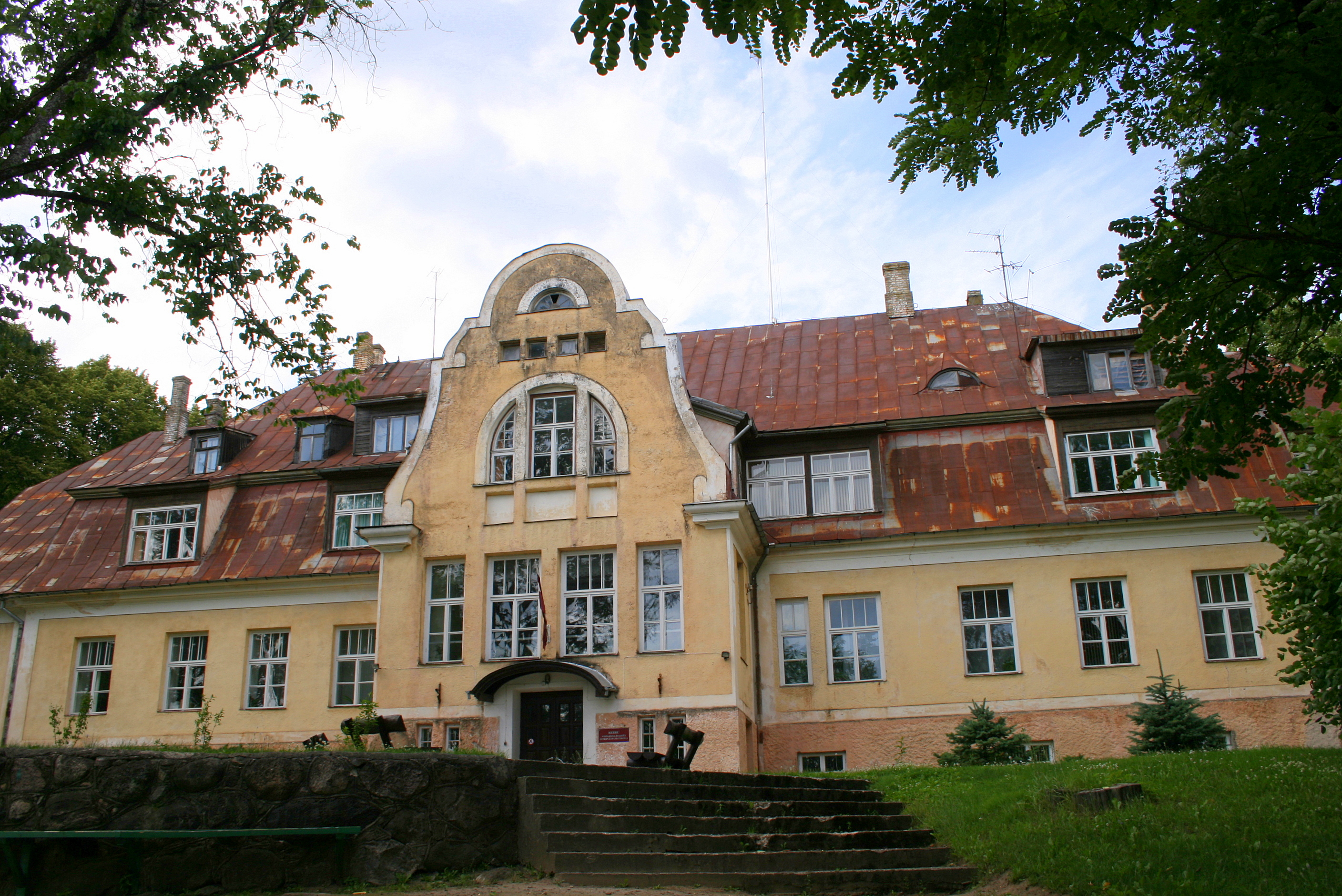
- Interactive map of the Vecbebri Manor area

General information
- Architectural style: Art Nouveau
- Location: Bebri Parish, Aizkraukle Municipality, Latvia
- Coordinates: 56°43′23″N 25°28′57″E
- Completed: First half of 19th century. Completely reconstructed in 1907
- Client: von Meyendorff family

Design and construction
- Architect: Reconstructed by Wilhelm Bockslaff

Vecbebri Manor (Latvian: Vecbebru muižas pils; German: Alt-Bewershof) is a manor house in the Bebri Parish of Aizkraukle Municipality in the Vidzeme region of Latvia.

== History ==
Vecbebri Manor was built during the first half of the 19th century in Classical style. Severely damaged by fire in 1905, the manor was later restored under the supervision of architect Vilhelms Bokslafs.. The last owner was the family von Meyendorff. It became a school building in 1922, and has housed the Bebri comprehensive boarding primary school (Bebru vispārizglītojošā internātpamatskola) since 1996.

== See also ==
- List of palaces and manor houses in Latvia
