= Pūre Parish =

Parish of Latvia

- parish of Latvia
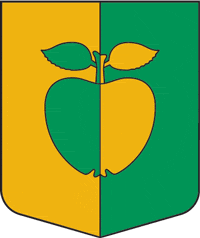
- Coat of arms

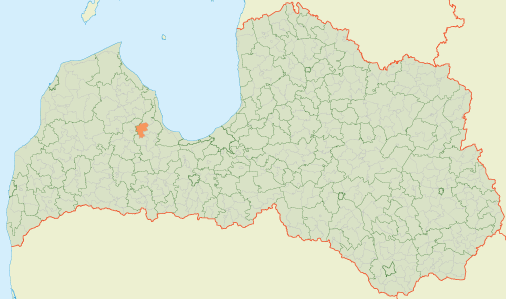
- Coordinates: 57°03′05″N 22°55′48″E
- Country: Latvia

Population (1 January 2026)
  - Total: 1,242

Pūre parish (Latvian: Pūres pagasts) is an administrative unit of Tukums Municipality in the Courland region of Latvia. The administrative center is Pūre.

== Towns, villages and settlements of Pūre parish ==
- Daigone
- Dzintars
- Lamiņi
- Meiniķi
- Pūre
- Vildene

== See also ==
- Lamiņi Manor
