= Taurupe Manor =

Manor house in Latvia

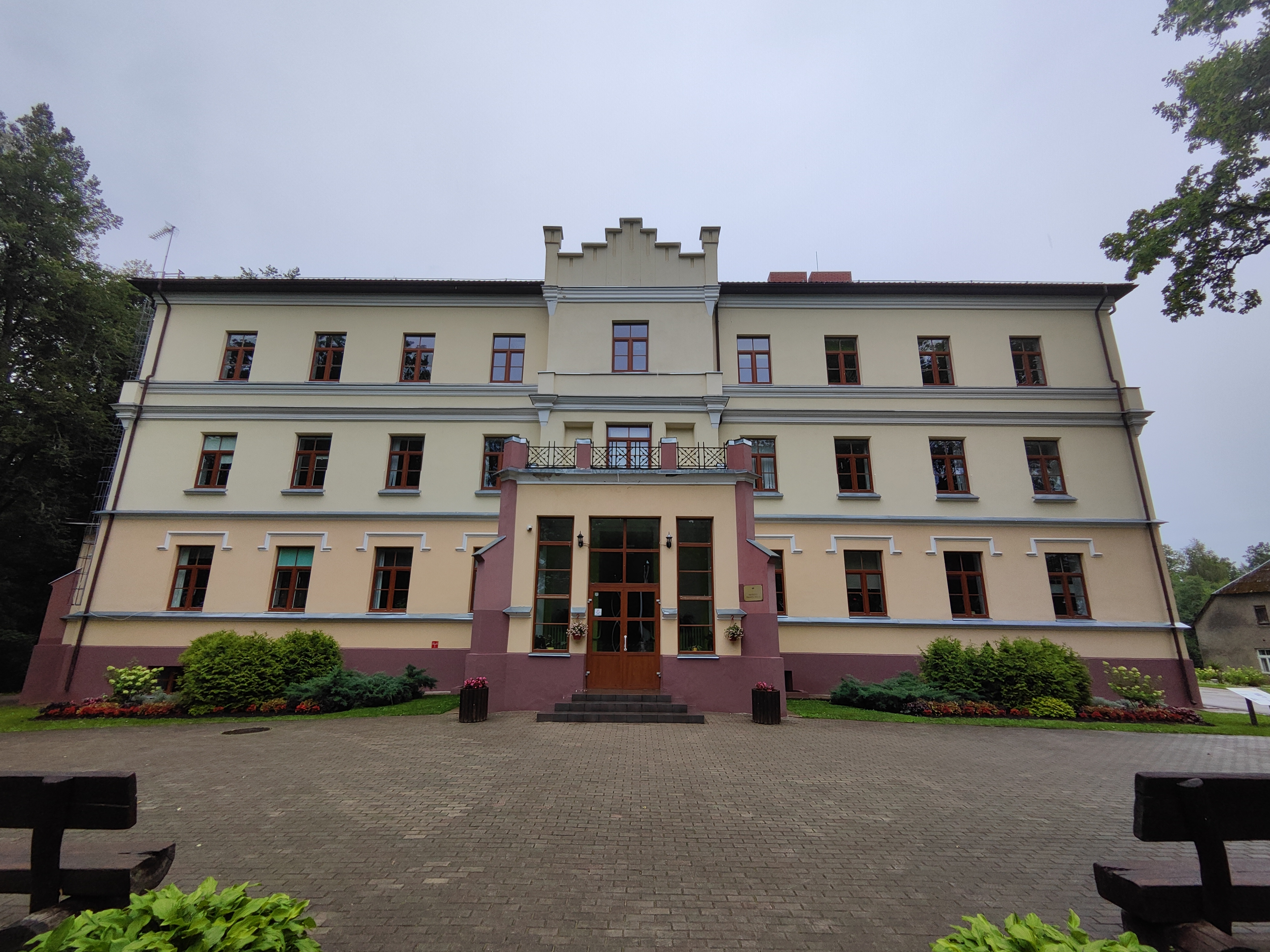
- Interactive map of the Taurupe Manor area

General information
- Architectural style: Neo-Gothic
- Location: Taurupe Parish, Ogre Municipality, Latvia
- Coordinates: 56°53′7″N 25°21′01″E
- Completed: 1900
- Client: von Transehe family

Design and construction
- Architect: Vilhelms Bokslafs

Taurupe Manor (Latvian: Taurupes muižas pils, German: Schloss Taurup) is a manor house in Taurupe Parish, Ogre Municipality in the Vidzeme region of Latvia. Originally built after 1724, it was rebuilt in Tudor Neo-Gothic style around 1900 according to a design by architect Vilhelms Bokslafs for the owner Baron von Transe.

During the 1905 Russian revolution Baron von Transe was shot to death by local peasants, his manor vandalized and then set ablaze. When the structure was finally repaired, it lost most of its former architectural details. In the 1920s Taurupe Manor was nationalized in accordance with Latvian Land Reform of 1920. After 1938 it was used as a school building and today it hosts the Taurupe Secondary School. During the Soviet occupation, a third storey was added after the previous second story roof suffered from a fire.

== See also ==
- List of palaces and manor houses in Latvia
