= Sēme Parish =

Parish of Latvia

- parish of Latvia
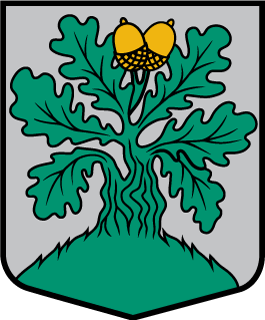
- Coat of arms

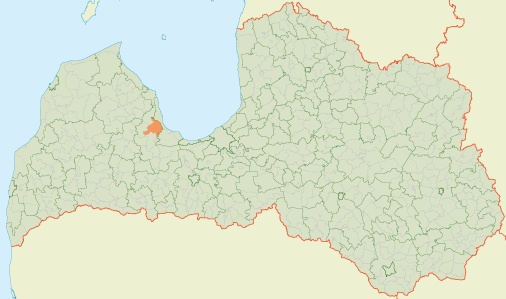
- Coordinates: 57°03′50″N 23°06′48″E
- Country: Latvia

Population (1 January 2026)
  - Total: 1,138

Sēme Parish (Latvian: Sēmes pagasts) is an administrative unit of Tukums Municipality in the Courland region of Latvia. The administrative center is Sēme.

== Towns, villages and settlements of Sēme parish ==
- Kaive
- Brizule
- Rideļi
- Sēme – parish administrative center

== See also ==
- Kaive Oak
