= Mālpils Manor =

Manor house in Latvia

Coordinates: 57.0064°N 24.9494°E

- Vidzeme, Latvia
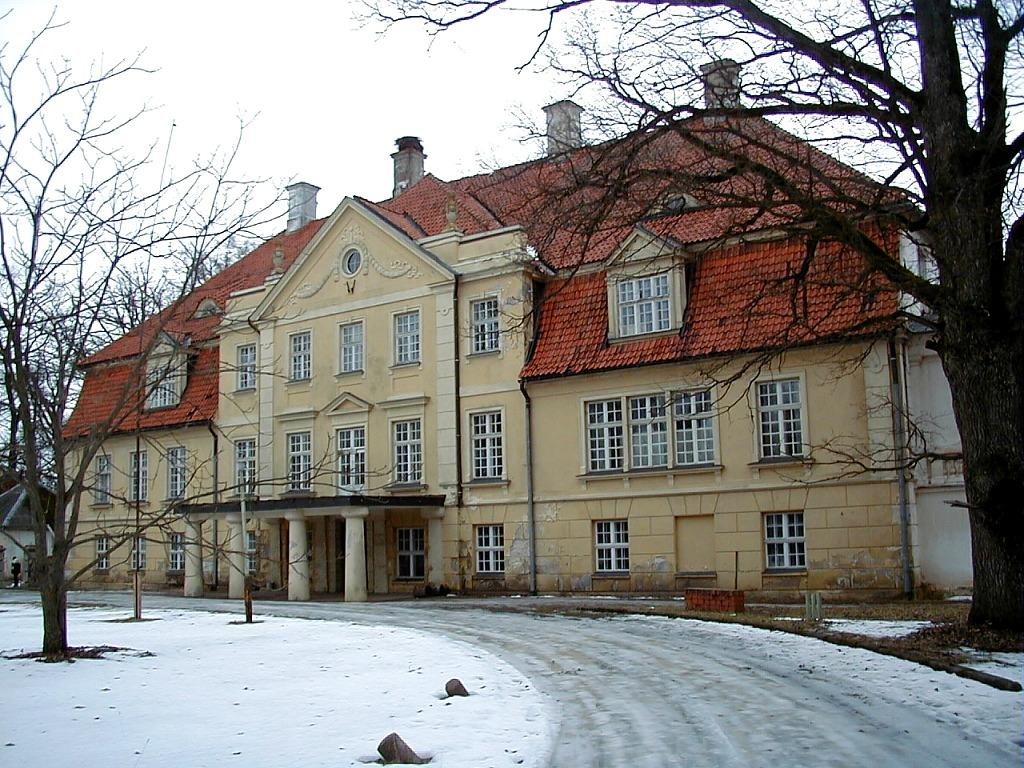

Site information
- Type: Manor

Mālpils Manor (Latvian: Mālpils muižas pils) is a manor house in the historical region of Vidzeme, in northern Latvia.

== History ==
A military castle (German: Schloß Lemburg) was built in the second half of the 14th century and demolished after the 1626 war. It was not replaced until the second half of the 18th century when a new manor house was built near the castle ruins. The manor burned down in 1905 and was rebuilt between 1907 and 1911 by master builder Jānis Meņģelis according to a design by architect Wilhelm Bockslaff.

From 1949 to 1965 it was the site of an irrigation technology school. After 1980 it housed a museum of agriculture and irrigation, displaying the first map of Latvia drawn in 1688 by Swedish engineers. The building was privatized and renovated after 2006 and now houses a restaurant and hotel with catering and conference facilities.

== See also ==
- List of palaces and manor houses in Latvia
