= Džūkste Parish =

Parish of Latvia

- parish of Latvia
- Coat of arms

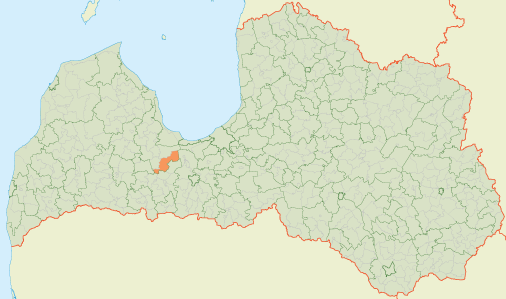
- Coordinates: 56°47′24″N 23°18′49″E
- Country: Latvia

Population (1 January 2026)
  - Total: 1,255

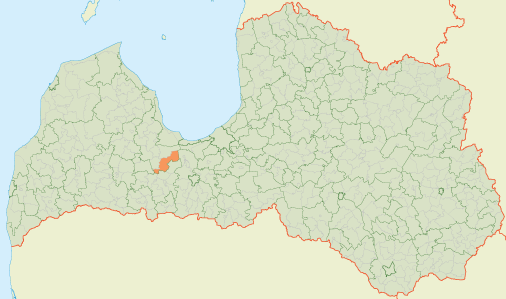
Location of the Džūkste Parish in Latvia

Džūkste Parish (Latvian: Džūkstes pagasts) is an administrative unit of Tukums Municipality in the Semigallia region of Latvia. The administrative center is Džūkste.

== Towns, villages and settlements of Džūkste parish ==
- Džūkste
- Lancenieki
- Pienava

== See also ==
- Džūkste Station
