= Wilhelm Bockslaff =

Latvian architect (1858–1945)

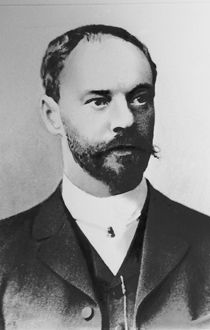
- Bockslaff before 1900.
- Born: 24 October [O.S. 12 October] 1858; Riga, Governorate of Livonia, Russian Empire
- Died: 9 March 1945 (aged 86); Posen, Wartheland, Nazi Germany
- Known for: Architecture
- Movement: Eclecticism, Art Nouveau

Wilhelm Ludwig Nikolai Bockslaff (Latvian: Vilhelms Ludvigs Nikolajs Bokslafs, Russian: Вильгельм Людвиг Николай Бокслаф; 24 October [O.S. 12 October] 1858, Riga – 9 March 1945, Poznań) was a Baltic German architect working in Riga. He is considered one of the most important representatives of Eclecticism, Neo-Gothic and Art Nouveau styles in the city. He is noted in particular for his construction of churches.

== Biography ==
Wilhelm Bockslaff was born in Riga on 12 October 1858. His father was the wealthy merchant and industrialist Nicholas Ludwig Bockslaff. In 1878 he started architecture studies in Riga Polytechnicum and graduated in 1885. After graduation, he stayed in the polytechnicum to work as an assistant. He also worked in the offices of architects Johann Koch and Heinrich Scheel. Later he established his own architects office. In this period he studied the history of St. Peter's church in Riga and other medieval buildings in the city. In 1894 he married Eva Riker.

Bockslaff worked mainly in eclectic styles, especially in the Neo-Gothic style. However, he also designed buildings in forms of Art Nouveau. Most notable buildings are Jaunmokas Manor near Tukums and the Commercial school in Riga (Now Art Academy of Latvia). The architect also restored many manors after the Revolution of 1905. He also has designed a large number of churches and various industrial objects such as factories and water towers.

In the 1930s he designed an impressive memorial for him and his wife in Riga Great Cemetery. However, only his wife was buried there in 1939. He himself was forced to leave Latvia together with a majority of Baltic Germans and settled in Posen. He died on 9 March 1945 in the bombing of Posen. His daughter buried him in the garden of their residence. After the war he was anonymously reburied in a local cemetery.

== Honour ==
In honor of the architect's 150th birthday, a monument was erected in the park of Mālpils Manor.

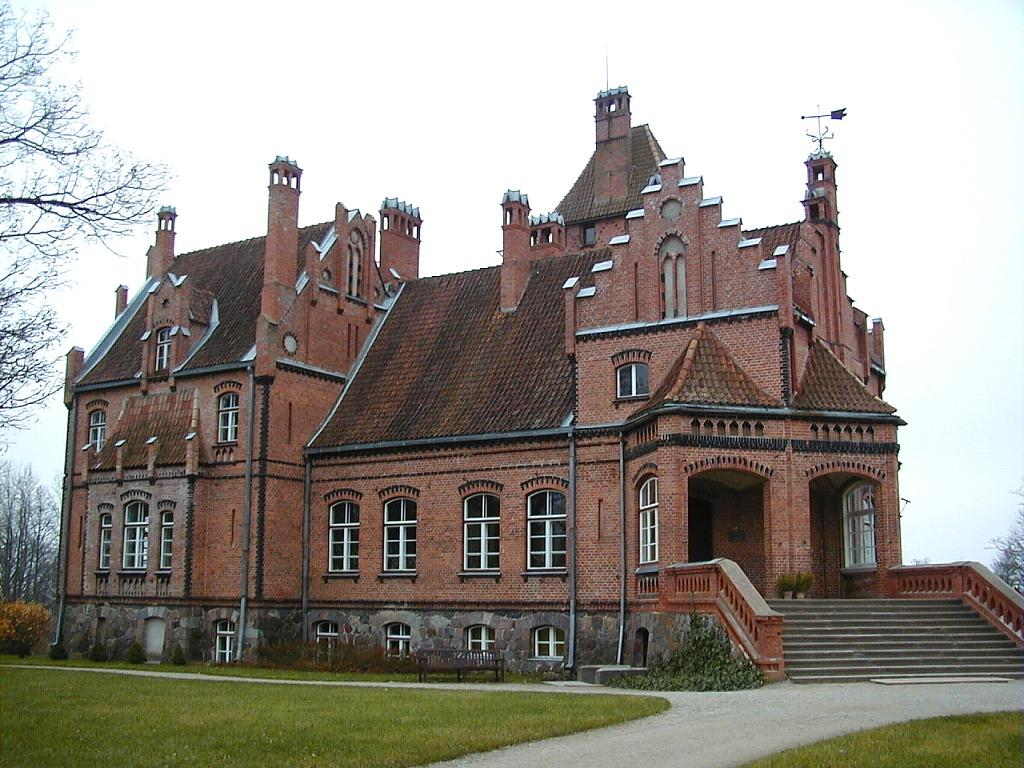
Jaunmokas Manor. Built in 1901

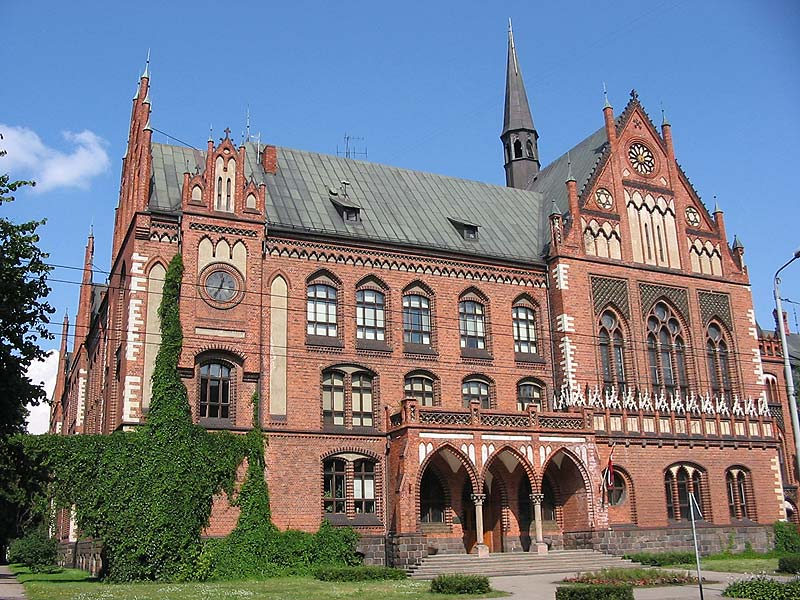
Commercial School built in 1902–1905. (Now Art Academy of Latvia.)

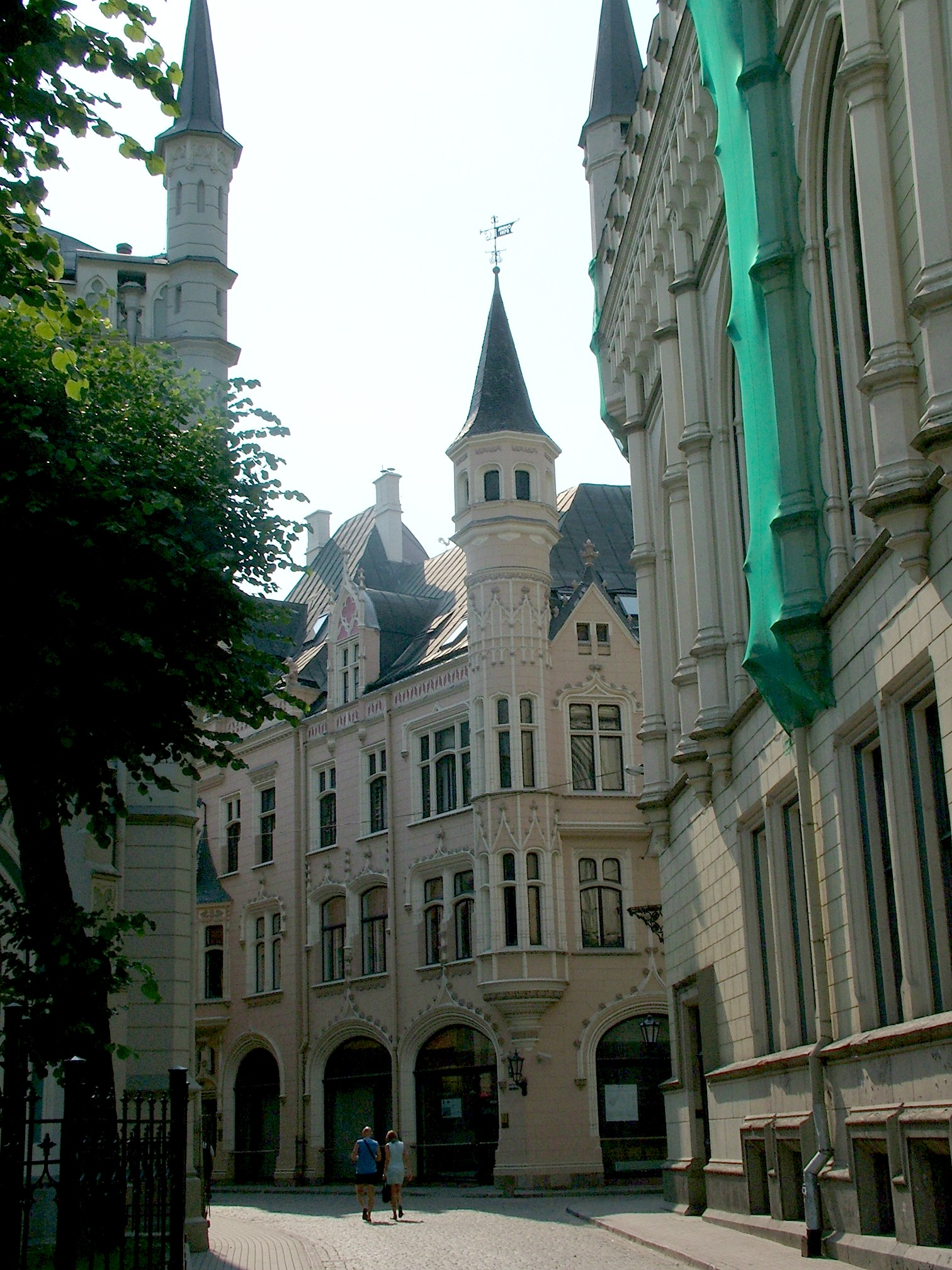
Building at the Amatu street 4, Old Riga. Built in 1903

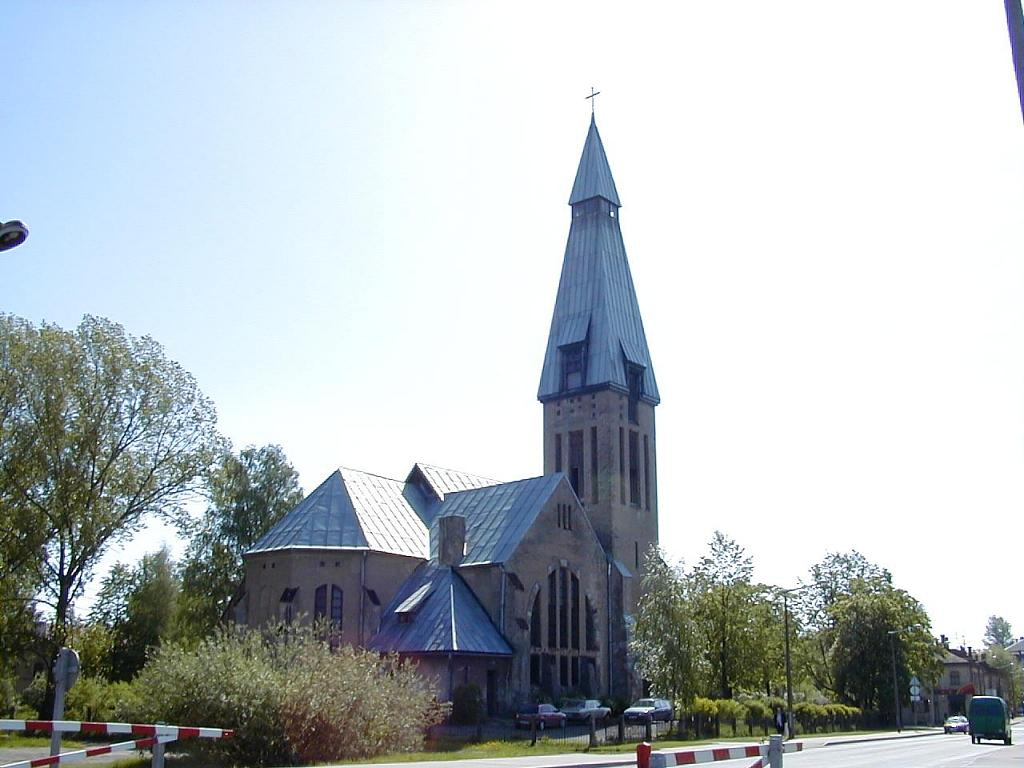
Church of the Cross, Riga. Built in 1910

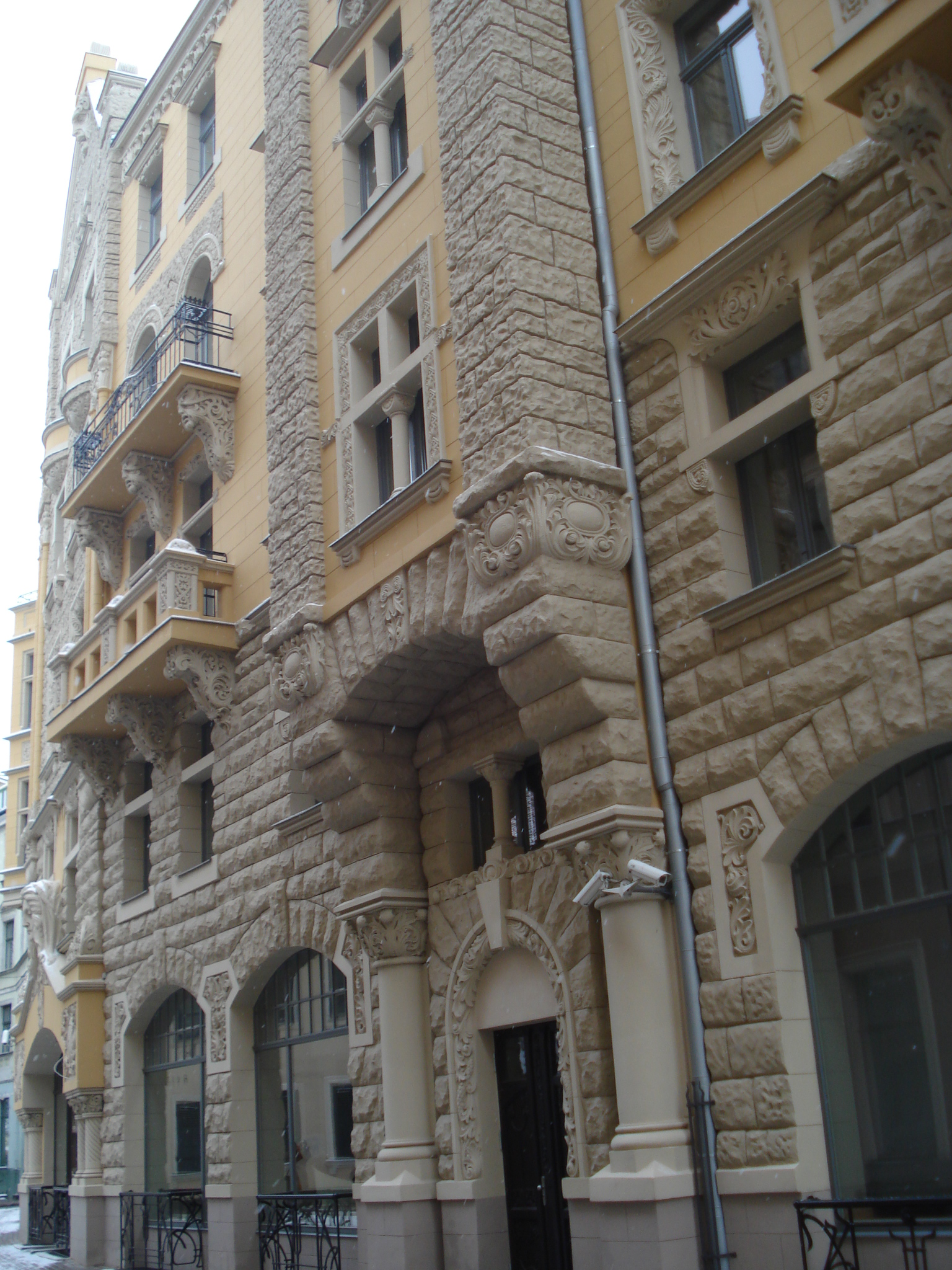
Building in Jauniela 25/29 (Neuburg house) Old Riga. Built in 1903

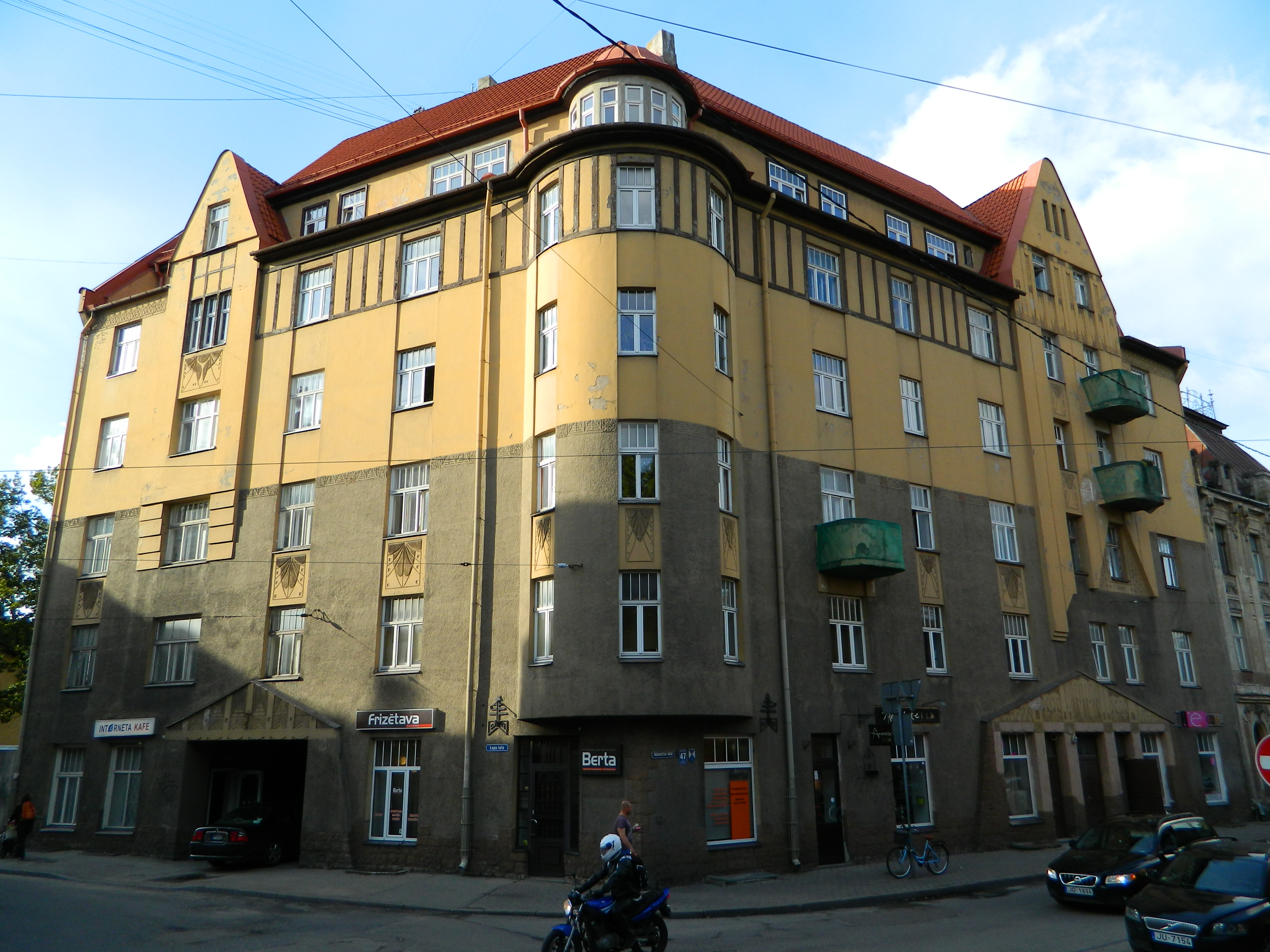
Building at the Nometņu street 47 (1909)

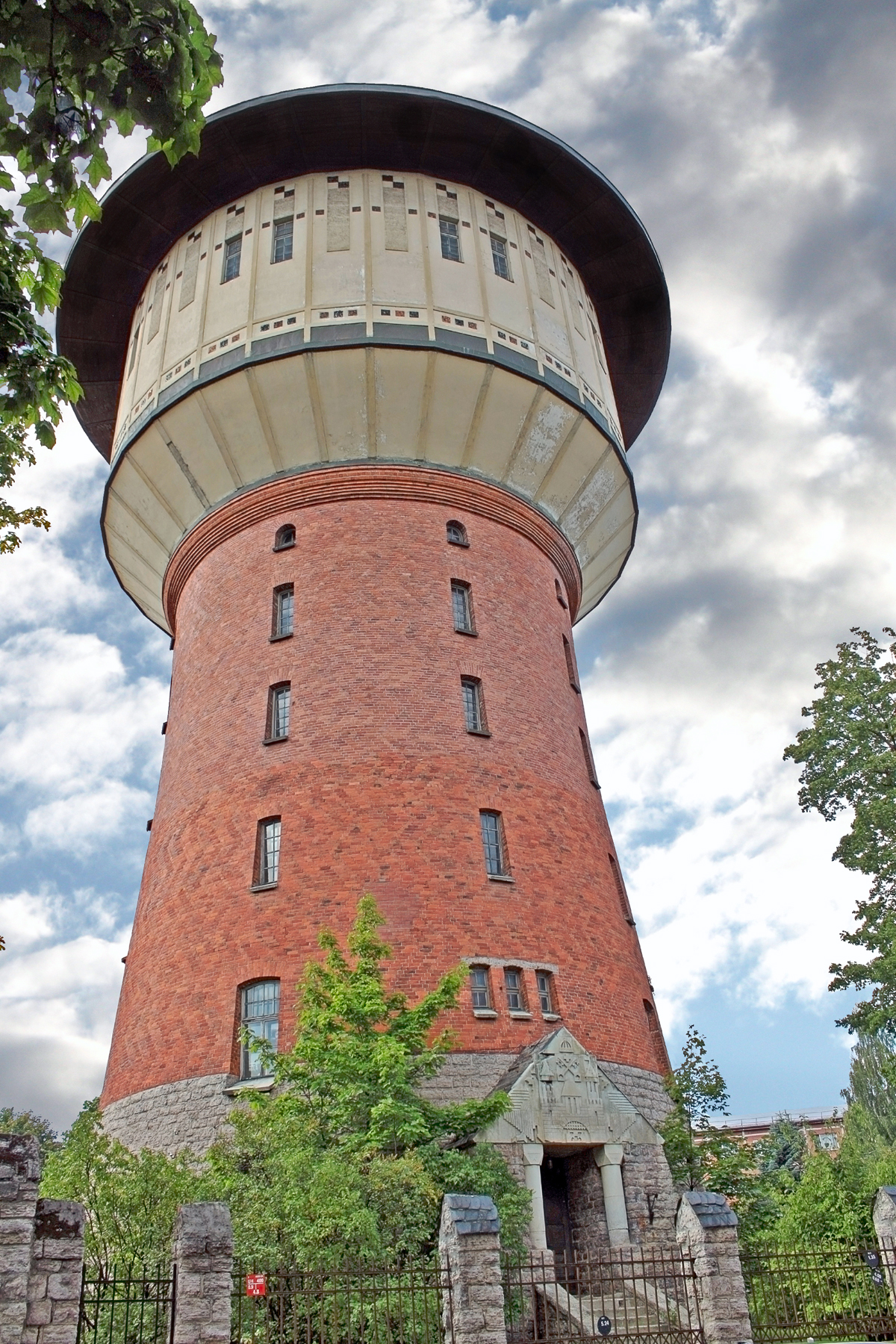
Water tower at the Alīses street 4, Riga. Built in 1910

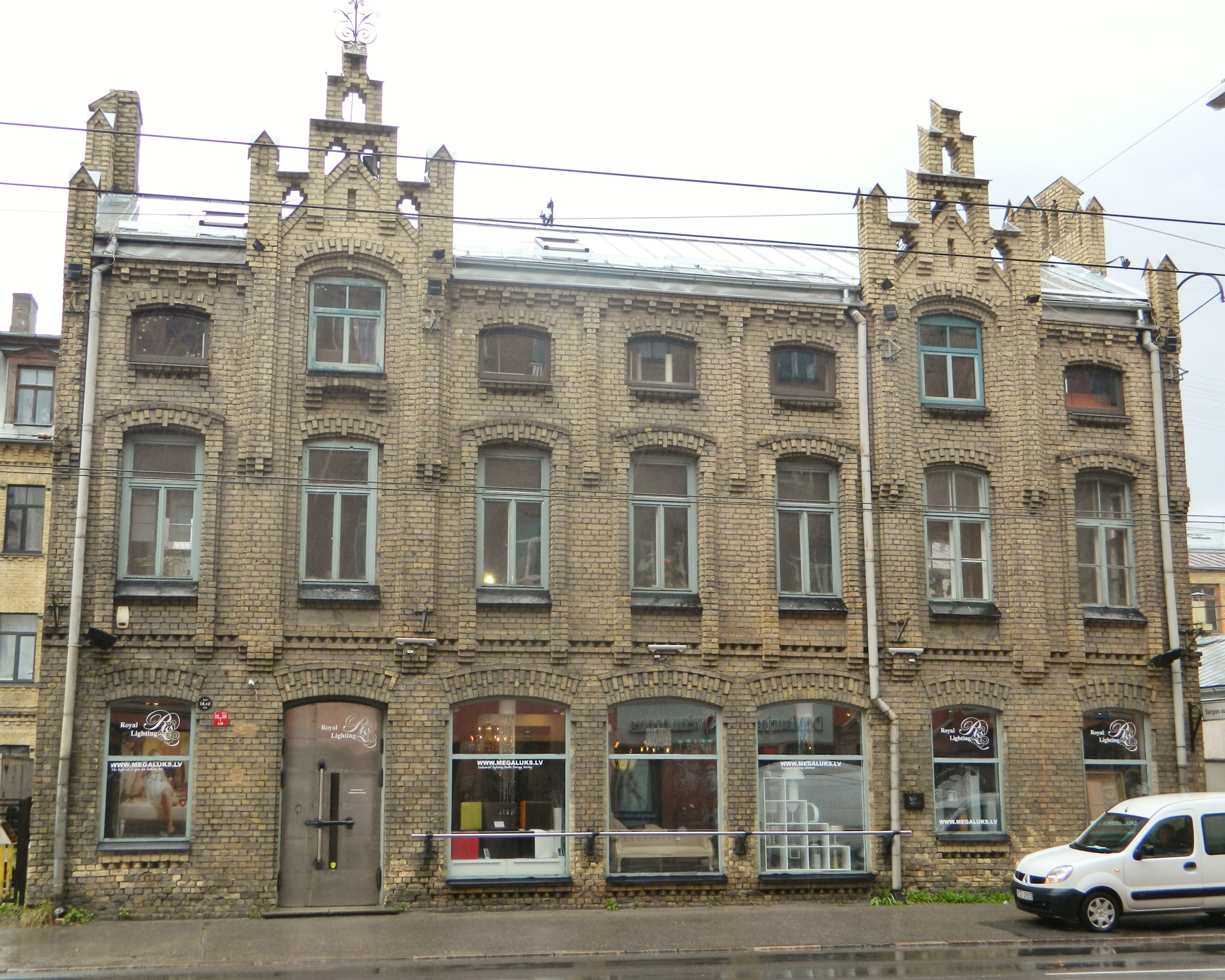
Building of the former Leutner bicycle factory on Brīvības street 137 Riga. Built in 1894.

== See also ==
- Dzelzava Manor
- Jaunmokas Manor
- Jaunpils Castle
- Lielstraupe Castle
- Mālpils Manor
- Taurupe Manor
- Vecbebri Manor
- List of Baltic German architects
