= Church of the Cross, Riga =

Church building in Riga, Latvia

Church of the Cross
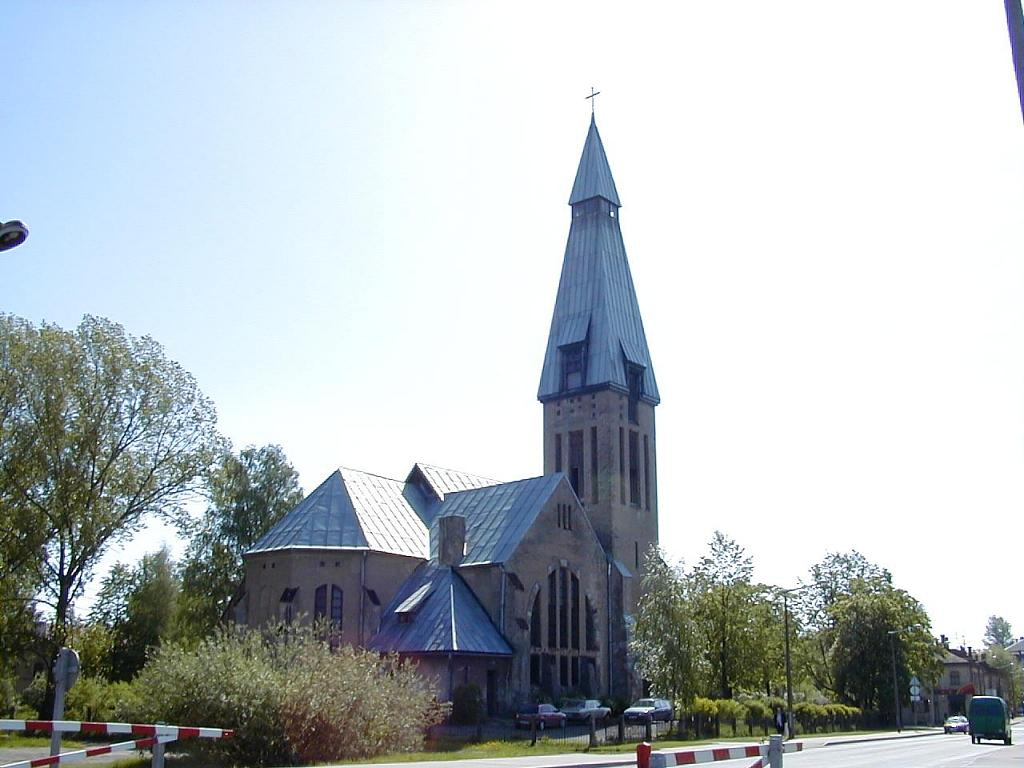

- Location within Latvia Riga metropolitan
- 56°59′1.71″N 24°11′40.39″E
- Location: Riga
- Country: Latvia
- Denomination: Lutheran

Architecture
- Architect: Wilhelm Bockslaff

Church of the Cross (Latvian: Krusta evaņģēliski luteriskā baznīca) is a Lutheran church in Riga, the capital of Latvia. It is a parish church of the Evangelical Lutheran Church of Latvia. The church is situated at the address 120 Ropažu Street.

Church building is consecrated in 1910. It is one of the few Latvian churches which is built in Art Nouveau style.
