= Irlava Parish =

Parish of Latvia

- parish of Latvia
- Coat of arms

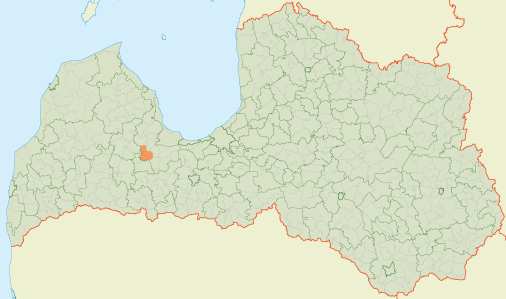
- Coordinates: 56°51′14″N 22°59′33″E
- Country: Latvia

Population (1 January 2026)
  - Total: 1,180

Irlava Parish (Latvian: Irlavas pagasts) is an administrative unit of Tukums Municipality, in the Courland region of Latvia. Est. Population 1700 People.

== Towns, villages and settlements of Irlava parish ==
- The biggest village in Irlava parish is Irlava but nearby village's also include Snapji and Sāti.
- The Abava river flows through Irlava.
- Irlava parish is covered in Forests and plains with some well known sites like: Peņku avots, Irlavas graveyard and the Spuņu rock.
