= Jaunpils =

Village in Latvia

- Village
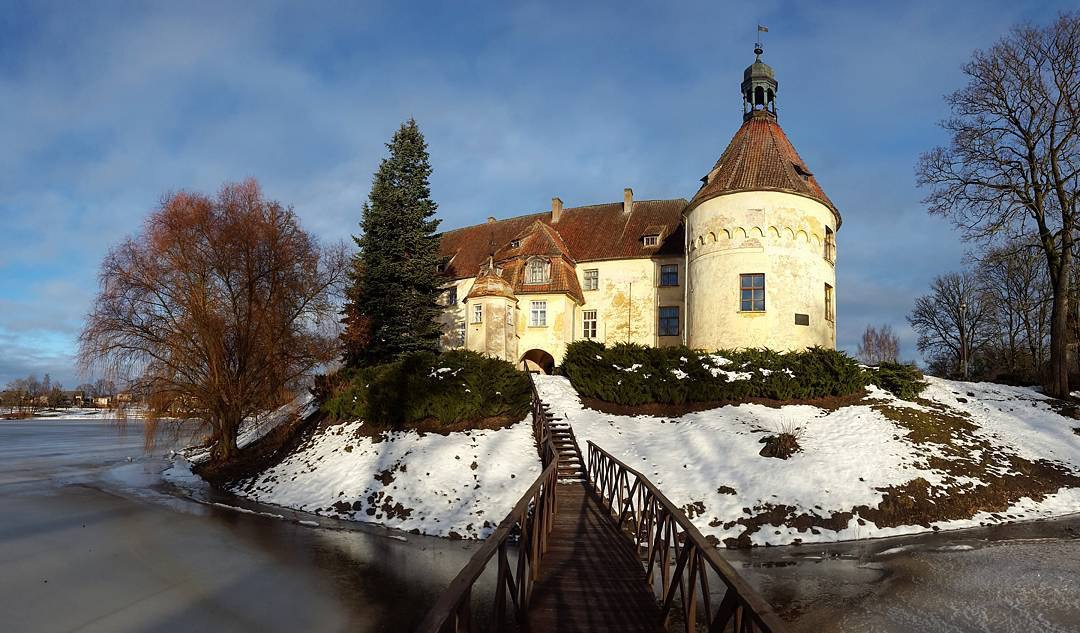
- Jaunpils Castle

- Jaunpils' location in Latvia
- Coordinates: 56°43′53.26″N 23°0′45.24″E
- Country: Latvia
- Municipality: Tukums
- Parish: Jaunpils

Population (2006)
  - Total: 1,029

Jaunpils (German: Neuenburg) is a village in the Jaunpils Parish of Tukums Municipality in the Semigallia region of Latvia.
