= Viesati Parish =

Parish of Latvia

- parish of Latvia
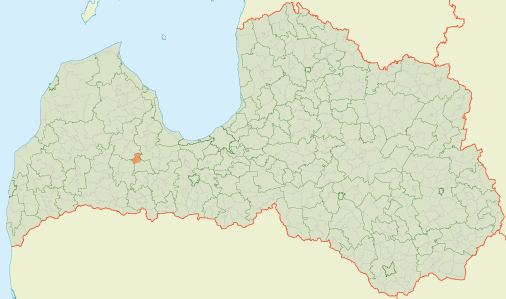
- 56°48′57″N 22°51′54″E
- Country: Latvia

Area
  - Total: 52.39 km^{2} (20.23 sq mi)
  - Land: 51.42 km^{2} (19.85 sq mi)
  - Water: 0.97 km^{2} (0.37 sq mi)

Population (1 January 2024)
  - Total: 329
  - Density: 6.3/km^{2} (16/sq mi)

Viesati Parish (Latvian: Viesatu pagasts) is an administrative unit of Tukums Municipality in the Courland region of Latvia.
