= Tukums Municipality =

Municipality of Latvia

Coordinates: 56°58′N 23°09′E

Tukums Municipality Tukuma novads
- Municipality
- Flag Coat of arms

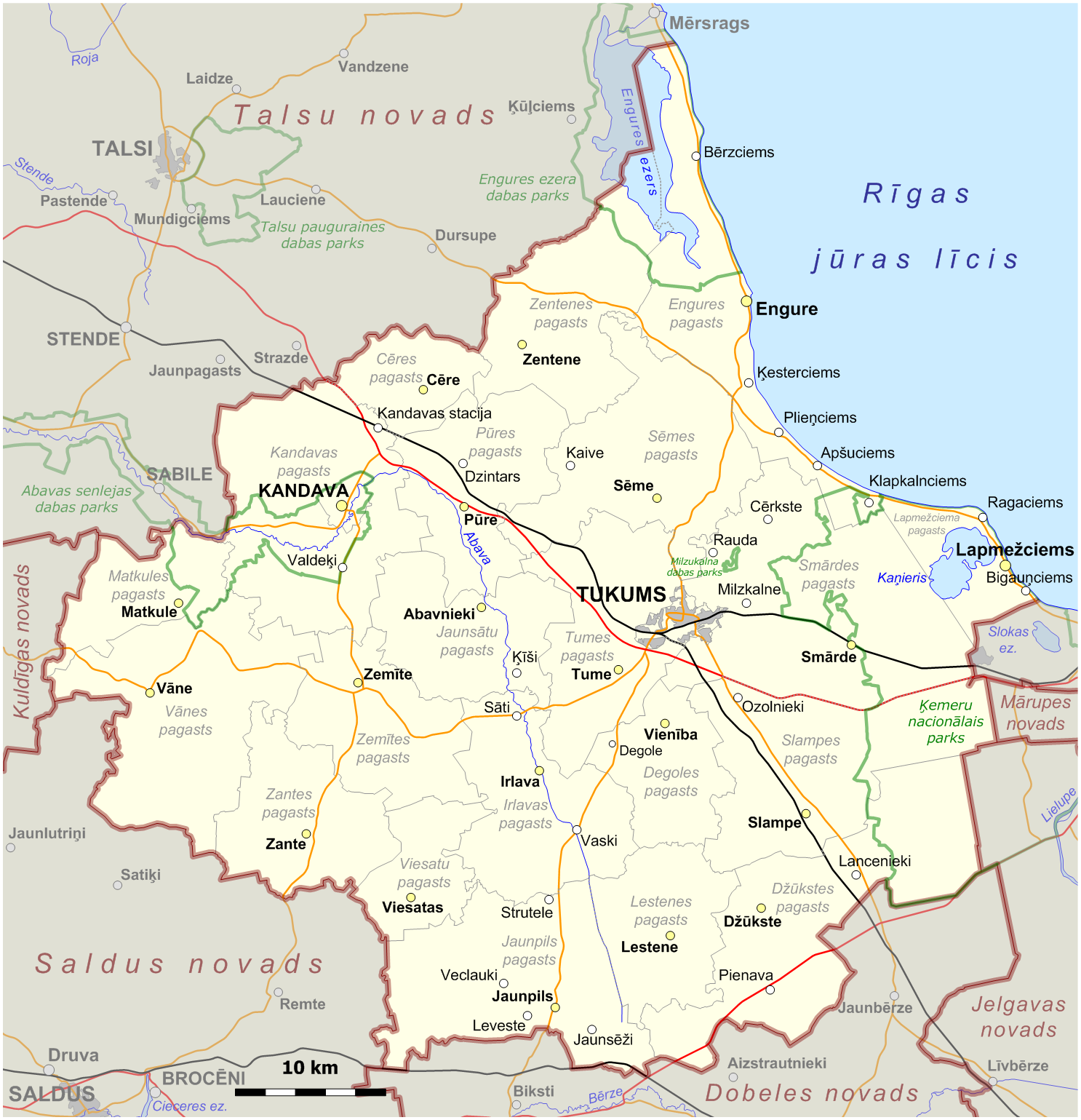
- Country: Latvia
- Formed: 2009
- Reformed: 2021
- Centre: Tukums

Government
  - Council Chair: Gundars Važa (LRA)
- Website: www.tukums.lv

Tukums Municipality (Latvian: Tukuma novads) is a Latvian municipality situated partly in the region of Semigallia, partly in Courland and partly in Vidzeme. The municipality was formed in 2009 by merging Degole Parish, Džūkste Parish, Irlava Parish, Jaunsāti Parish, Lestene Parish, Pūre Parish, Sēme Parish, Slampe Parish, Tume Parish, Zentene Parish and Tukums town; the administrative centre being Tukums. The population in 2020 was 27,613.

On 1 July 2021, Tukums Municipality was enlarged when Engure Municipality, Jaunpils Municipality and Kandava Municipality were merged into it.

== Population ==
Territorial unit	Population (year)
Degole parish	665 (2018)
Džūkste Parish	1417 (2018)
Irlava Parish	1406 (2018)
Jaunsāti Parish	906 (2018)
Lestene Parish	650 (2018)
Pūre Parish	1436 (2018)
Sēme Parish	1240 (2018)
Slampe Parish	1855 (2018)
Tukums	18447 (2018)
Tume Parish	1748 (2018)
Zentene Parish	504 (2018)

== Twin towns — sister cities ==
Tukums is twinned with:

- Andrychów, Poland
- Bnei Ayish, Israel
- Chennevières-sur-Marne, France
- Izium, Ukraine
- Karelichy, Belarus
- Krasnogorsk, Russia
- Plungė, Lithuania
- Scheeßel, Germany
- Tidaholm, Sweden

== Notable people ==
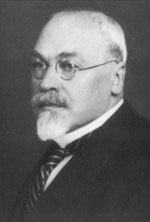
Gustavs Zemgals, 1927

- Karl Wilhelm von Kupffer (1829 in Lesten – 1902), a Baltic German anatomist who discovered stellate macrophage cells
- Theophil Joachim Heinrich Bienert (1833 in Kandava – 1873), a Baltic German botanist
- Krišjānis Barons (1835 in Jaunpils Parish – 1923), a Latvian writer, known as the "father of the dainas"
- Kārlis Mīlenbahs (1853 in Kandava parish – 1916), the first native speaker of Latvian to devote his career to linguistics.
- Oswald Külpe (1862 in Kandava – 1915), a Baltic German structural psychologist
- Gustavs Zemgals (1871 in Džūkste – 1939), politician, the second President of Latvia, 1927/1930 and twice the mayor of Riga.
- Oskars Dankers (1883 in Irlava Parish – 1965), a Latvian general appointed head of the German-controlled Latvian Self-Government.
- Hugo Kārlis Grotuss (1884 in Jaunpils parish – 1951), a Latvian painter, classified as a Realist.
- Zanis Waldheims (1909 in Jaunpils – 1993), a geometric abstractionist artist
- Vija Artmane (1929 in Kaive – 2008), theatre and cinema actress of partial Baltic German ancestry
- Jānis Vitenbergs (born 1985), politician, Minister of Economics 2020 to 2021 and 2021 to 2022
- Baiba Sipeniece-Gavare (born 1970 in Jaunpils), humorist, actress, TV and radio presenter and events manager.

== Gallery ==
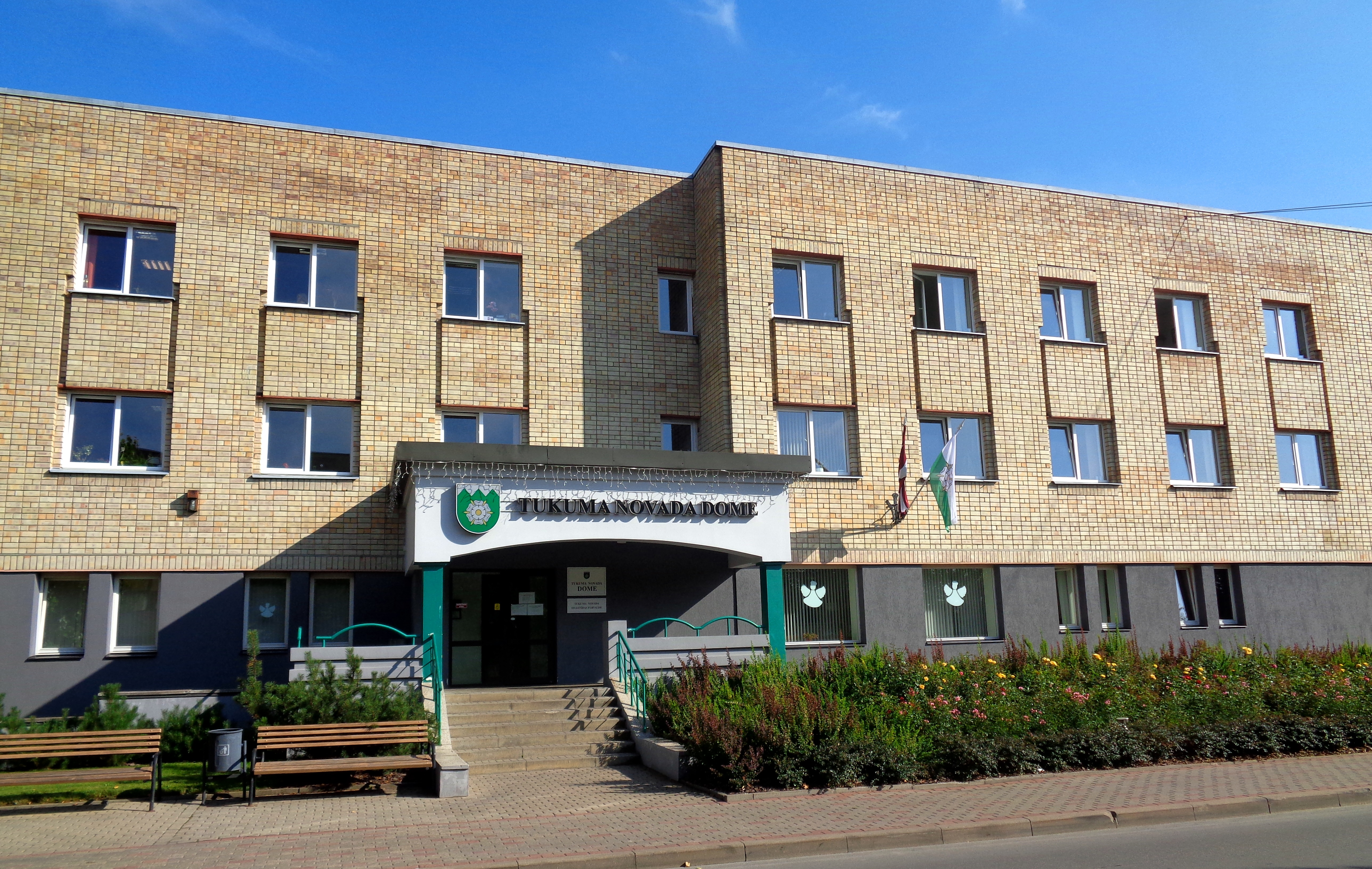
Council of Tukums Municipality

== See also ==
- Administrative divisions of Latvia
