= Lists of twin towns and sister cities =

This is a list of "twin towns" or "sister cities" — that is, pairs of towns or cities in different countries which have town twinning arrangements.

Note that the list is likely to always remain incomplete, since no canonical list of such arrangements exists. Any twinning arrangement should be listed at two locations in the list: once for each of the towns involved in the arrangement.

Due to the extreme size of this list and for ease of navigation, the list is divided into separate lists by continent, which are then organized by country. Lists for some countries have in turn been moved to separate lists, which are linked individually below.

== Africa ==
- List of twin towns and sister cities in Africa
  - List of twin towns and sister cities in Cape Verde
  - List of twin towns and sister cities in Egypt
  - List of twin towns and sister cities in Kenya
  - List of twin towns and sister cities in Morocco
  - List of twin towns and sister cities in South Africa
  - List of twin towns and sister cities in Tunisia

== Asia ==
- List of twin towns and sister cities in Asia
  - List of twin towns and sister cities in Armenia
  - List of twin towns and sister cities in Azerbaijan
  - List of twin towns and sister cities in Bangladesh
  - List of twin towns and sister cities in China
  - List of twin towns and sister cities in Georgia
  - List of twin towns and sister cities in India
  - List of twin towns and sister cities in Indonesia
  - List of twin towns and sister cities in Iran
  - List of twin towns and sister cities in Iraq
  - List of twin towns and sister cities in Israel
  - List of twin towns and sister cities in Japan
  - List of twin towns and sister cities in Jordan
  - List of twin towns and sister cities in Kazakhstan
  - List of twin towns and sister cities in Malaysia
  - List of twin towns and sister cities in Pakistan
  - List of twin towns and sister cities in Palestine
  - List of sister cities in the Philippines
  - List of twin towns and sister cities in Russia
  - List of twin towns and sister cities in South Korea
  - List of twin towns and sister cities in Taiwan
  - List of sister cities in Thailand
  - List of twin towns and sister cities in Vietnam

== Australia and Oceania ==
- List of twin towns and sister cities in Oceania
  - List of twin towns and sister cities in Australia
  - List of twin towns and sister cities in Fiji
  - List of twin towns and sister cities in New Zealand

== Europe ==
- List of sister cities in Europe
  - List of twin towns and sister cities in Albania
  - List of twin towns and sister cities in Austria
  - List of twin towns and sister cities in Belarus
  - List of twin towns and sister cities in Belgium
  - List of twin towns and sister cities in Bosnia and Herzegovina
  - List of twin towns and sister cities in Bulgaria
  - List of twin towns and sister cities in Croatia
  - List of twin towns and sister cities in the Czech Republic
  - List of twin towns and sister cities in Denmark
  - List of twin towns and sister cities in Estonia
  - List of twin towns and sister cities in Finland
  - List of twin towns and sister cities in France
  - List of twin towns and sister cities in Germany
  - List of twin towns and sister cities in Greece
  - List of twin towns and sister cities in Hungary
  - List of twin towns and sister cities in Iceland
  - List of twin towns and sister cities in the Republic of Ireland
  - List of twin towns and sister cities in Italy
  - List of twin towns and sister cities in Latvia
  - List of twin towns and sister cities in Lithuania
  - List of twin towns and sister cities in Luxembourg
  - List of twin towns and sister cities in Malta
  - List of twin towns and sister cities in Moldova
  - List of twin towns and sister cities in Montenegro
  - List of twin towns and sister cities in the Netherlands
  - List of twin towns and sister cities in North Macedonia
  - List of twin towns and sister cities in Norway
  - List of twin towns and sister cities in Poland
  - List of twin towns and sister cities in Portugal
  - List of twin towns and sister cities in Romania
  - List of twin towns and sister cities in Russia
  - List of twin towns and sister cities in Serbia
  - List of twin towns and sister cities in Slovakia
  - List of twin towns and sister cities in Slovenia
  - List of twin towns and sister cities in Spain
  - List of twin towns and sister cities in Sweden
  - List of twin towns and sister cities in Switzerland
  - List of twin towns and sister cities in Turkey
  - List of twin towns and sister cities in Ukraine
  - List of twin towns and sister cities in the United Kingdom
    - List of twin towns and sister cities in England
    - List of twin towns and sister cities in Scotland
    - List of twin towns and sister cities in Wales

== North America ==
- List of twin towns and sister cities in North America
  - List of twin towns and sister cities in Canada
  - List of twin towns and sister cities in Cuba
  - List of twin towns and sister cities in Mexico
  - List of twin towns and sister cities in Nicaragua
  - List of sister cities in the United States

== South America ==
- List of twin towns and sister cities in South America
  - List of twin towns and sister cities in Argentina
  - List of twin towns and sister cities in Brazil
  - List of twin towns and sister cities in Chile
