= List of twin towns and sister cities in Bangladesh =

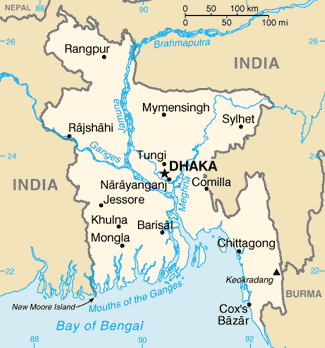
Map of Bangladesh

This is a list of places in Bangladesh which have standing links to local communities in other countries known as "town twinning" (usually in Europe) or "sister cities" (usually in the rest of the world).

== C ==
Chittagong

- Goiânia, Brazil
- Kunming, China

== D ==
Dhaka

- Karachi, Pakistan
- Kolkata, India
- Lima, Peru

Dhaka South City Corporation

- Sector 3 (Bucharest), Romania

== R ==
Rajshahi

- Kristiansand, Norway

== S ==
Sylhet

- Paterson, United States
- Portsmouth, England, United Kingdom
