= List of twin towns and sister cities in Iceland =

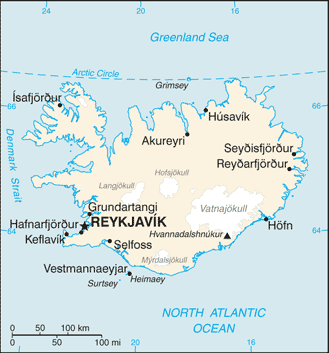
Map of Iceland

This is a list of municipalities in Iceland which have standing links to local communities in other countries known as "town twinning" (usually in Europe) or "sister cities" (usually in the rest of the world).

== A ==
Akranes

- Bamble, Norway
- Närpes, Finland
- Qaqortoq, Greenland
- Sørvágur, Faroe Islands
- Tønder, Denmark
- Västervik, Sweden

Akureyri

- Ålesund, Norway
- Denver, United States
- Gimli, Canada
- Hafnarfjörður, Iceland
- Lahti, Finland
- Narsaq, Greenland
- Randers, Denmark
- Vágur, Faroe Islands
- Västerås, Sweden

Árborg

- Arendal, Norway
- Kalmar, Sweden
- Savonlinna, Finland

== B ==
Blönduós

- Horsens, Denmark
- Karlstad, Sweden
- Moss, Norway
- Nokia, Finland

== D ==
Dalvíkurbyggð

- Hamar, Norway
- Ittoqqortoormiit (Sermersooq), Greenland
- Lund, Sweden
- Porvoo, Finland
- Viborg, Denmark

== F ==
Fjarðabyggð

- Esbjerg, Denmark
- Eskilstuna, Sweden
- Gravelines, France
- Jyväskylä, Finland
- Qeqqata, Greenland
- Stavanger, Norway
- Vágar, Faroe Islands

Fljótsdalshérað

- Eidsvoll, Norway
- Raseborg, Finland
- Runavík, Faroe Islands
- Skara, Sweden
- Sorø, Denmark

== G ==
Garðabær

- Asker, Norway
- Eslöv, Sweden
- Jakobstad, Finland
- Rudersdal, Denmark

Grindavík

- Ílhavo, Portugal
- Jonzac, France
- Penistone, England, United Kingdom
- Piteå, Sweden
- Rovaniemi, Finland
- Uniejów, Poland

Grundarfjarðarbær

- Paimpol, France

== H ==
Hafnarfjörður

- Akureyri, Iceland
- Bærum, Norway
- Baoding, China
- Cuxhaven, Germany
- Frederiksberg, Denmark
- Hämeenlinna, Finland
- Ilulissat (Avannaata), Greenland
- Tartu, Estonia
- Tvøroyri, Faroe Islands
- Uppsala, Sweden

Hveragerði

- Äänekoski, Finland
- Ikast-Brande, Denmark
- Örnsköldsvik, Sweden
- Sigdal, Norway
- Tarp, Germany

== I ==
Ísafjarðarbær

- Joensuu, Finland
- Kaufering, Germany
- Linköping, Sweden
- Runavík, Faroe Islands
- Tønsberg, Norway

== K ==
Kópavogur

- Klaksvík, Faroe Islands
- Mariehamn, Åland Islands, Finland
- Norrköping, Sweden
- Odense, Denmark
- Sermersooq, Greenland
- Tampere, Finland
- Trondheim, Norway
- Wuhan, China

== M ==
Mosfellsbær

- Loimaa, Finland
- Skien, Norway
- Thisted, Denmark
- Uddevalla, Sweden

== N ==
Norðurþing

- Aalborg, Denmark
- Eastport, United States
- Fredrikstad, Norway
- Fuglafjørður, Faroe Islands
- Karlskoga, Sweden
- Qeqertarsuaq, Greenland
- Riihimäki, Finland

== R ==
Reykjanesbær

- Kerava, Finland
- Trollhättan, Sweden

Reykjavík

- Lviv, Ukraine
- Seattle, United States
- Vilnius, Lithuania
- Winnipeg, Canada
- Wrocław, Poland

== S ==
Seltjarnarnes

- Lieto, Finland
- Nesodden, Norway
- Herlev, Denmark
- Höganäs, Sweden

Seyðisfjörður terminated all its twinnings.

Skagafjörður

- Espoo, Finland
- Køge, Denmark
- Kongsberg, Norway
- Kristianstad, Sweden

Skagaströnd

- Lohja, Finland
- Ringerike, Norway

Snæfellsbær

- Vestmanna, Faroe Islands

Strandabyggð

- Faaborg-Midtfyn, Denmark
- Hole, Norway
- Kustavi, Finland
- Tanum, Sweden

Stykkishólmur

- Drammen, Norway
- Kolding, Denmark
- Lappeenranta, Finland
- Örebro, Sweden

== V ==
Vestmannaeyjar

- Borlänge, Sweden

Vesturbyggð terminated all its twinnings.
