= List of twin towns and sister cities in Cape Verde =

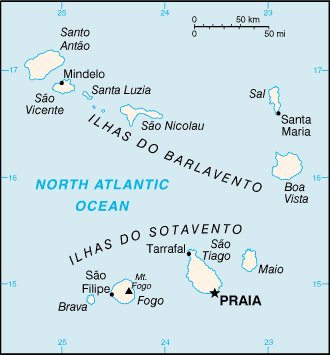
Map of Cape Verde

This is a list of municipalities in Cape Verde having standing links to local communities in other countries known as "town twinning" (usually in Europe) or "sister cities" (usually in the rest of the world).

== B ==
Boa Vista

- Aljezur, Portugal
- Anadia, Portugal
- Cabeceiras de Basto, Portugal
- Felgueiras, Portugal
- Loulé, Portugal
- Seixal, Portugal
- Zocca, Italy

Brava

- Cartaxo, Portugal
- Santarém, Portugal

== M ==
Maio

- Arraiolos, Portugal
- Loures, Portugal
- São João da Madeira, Portugal
- Vila Nova de Poiares, Portugal

Mosteiros

- Amadora, Portugal
- Ansião, Portugal
- Azambuja, Portugal
- Brockton, United States
- Entroncamento, Portugal

== P ==
Paul

- Ribeira Grande, Portugal

Porto Novo

- Angra do Heroísmo, Portugal
- Madalena, Portugal
- Ribeira Grande, Portugal
- Tavira, Portugal

Praia

- Boston, United States
- Faro, Portugal
- Figueira da Foz, Portugal
- Fortaleza, Brazil
- Funchal, Portugal
- Gondomar, Portugal
- Jinan, China
- Lisbon, Portugal
- Macau, China
- Ponta Delgada, Portugal
- Providence, United States
- Rio de Janeiro, Brazil

== R ==
Ribeira Brava

- Abrantes, Portugal
- Beja, Portugal
- Braga, Portugal
- Maia, Portugal
- Ovar, Portugal
- Santo André, Brazil
- Silves, Portugal

Ribeira Grande

- Ribeira Grande, Portugal
- Torres Novas, Portugal
- Viana do Castelo, Portugal

Ribeira Grande de Santiago

- Angra do Heroísmo, Portugal
- Guimarães, Portugal
- Lagos, Portugal
- Ribeira Grande, Portugal
- Tomar, Portugal

== S ==
Sal

- Albufeira, Portugal
- Almada, Portugal
- Belmonte, Portugal
- Cascais, Portugal
- Desenzano del Garda, Italy
- Fortaleza, Brazil
- Lourinhã, Portugal
- Macedo de Cavaleiros, Portugal
- Maia, Portugal
- Sanya, China

Santa Catarina

- Hattersheim am Main, Germany
- Saint-Denis, France
- Vila Franca de Xira, Portugal

Santa Catarina do Fogo

- Miranda do Corvo, Portugal
- Scituate, United States
- Vila Nova da Barquinha, Portugal

Santa Cruz

- Alfândega da Fé, Portugal
- Aveiro, Portugal
- Candiolo, Italy
- Lagoa, Portugal
- Sines, Portugal

São Domingos

- Barcelos, Portugal
- Lagoa, Portugal
- Madalena, Portugal

São Filipe

- Brockton, United States
- Fortaleza, Brazil
- Matosinhos, Portugal
- Montijo, Portugal
- Ourém, Portugal
- Palmela, Portugal
- Sesimbra, Portugal
- Viseu, Portugal
- Ziguinchor, Senegal

São Lourenço dos Órgãos

- Anadia, Portugal

São Vicente

- Angra do Heroísmo, Portugal
- Aquiraz, Brazil
- Benguela, Angola
- Coimbra, Portugal
- Felgueiras, Portugal
- Mafra, Portugal
- Oeiras, Portugal
- Portalegre, Portugal
- Portimão, Portugal
- Porto, Portugal
- Vagos, Portugal
- Vila Nova de Famalicão, Portugal

== T ==
Tarrafal

- Amadora, Portugal
- Grândola, Portugal
- Marinha Grande, Portugal
- Mé-Zóchi, São Tomé and Príncipe
- Moita, Portugal
- Ponte de Sor, Portugal
- Povoação, Portugal
- Vila Franca de Xira, Portugal

Tarrafal de São Nicolau

- Braga, Portugal
- Maia, Portugal
