= List of twin towns and sister cities in Kenya =

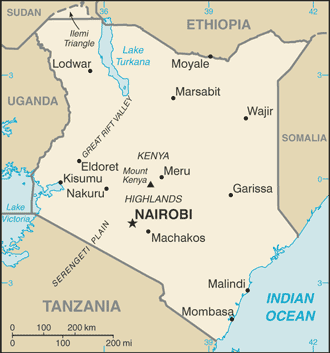
Map of Kenya

This is a list of municipalities in Kenya which have standing links to local communities in other countries. In most cases, the association, especially when formalised by local government, is known as "town twinning" (usually in Europe) or "sister cities" (usually in the rest of the world).

== B ==
Bomet

- Milwaukee, United States

Bondo

- Taber, Canada

Bura

- Newburyport, United States

== E ==
Eldoret

- Ithaca, United States
- Minneapolis, United States
- Portsmouth, United States

Esabalu

- Amesbury, United States

== G ==
Garissa Township

- Portland, United States

== K ==
Kabarnet

- Hürth, Germany

Kisumu

- Boulder, United States
- Roanoke, United States

== M ==
Marsabit

- Hinesville, United States

Mombasa

- Busan, South Korea
- Durban, South Africa
- Fuzhou, China
- Guangzhou, China
- Honolulu, United States
- Long Beach, United States
- Seattle, United States

== N ==
Nairobi

- Addis Ababa, Ethiopia
- Denver, United States
- Kunming, China
- Lowell, United States
- Raleigh, United States
- São Luís, Brazil

Nyeri

- Amherst, United States

== T ==
Taveta

- Melhus, Norway

Thika

- Dixon, United States

== U ==
Uasin Gishu

- Scottsdale, United States

== W ==
Wajir

- Haliliye, Turkey
