= List of twin towns and sister cities in Chile =

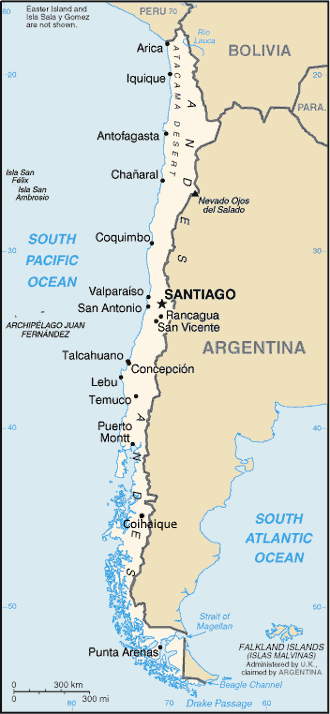
Map of Chile

This is a list of municipalities in Chile which have standing links to local communities in other countries. In most cases, the association, especially when formalised by local government, is known as "town twinning" (usually in Europe) or "sister cities" (usually in the rest of the world).

== A ==
Los Andes

- Saltillo, Mexico

Antofagasta

- Split, Croatia
- Tongling, China
- Volos, Greece

Arica

- Arequipa, Peru
- Eilat, Israel
- Montevideo, Uruguay

== B ==
Lo Barnechea

- Tyler, United States

== C ==
Calama

- Arad, Israel

La Calera

- Beit Jala, Palestine

Chanco

- Zapotlanejo, Mexico

Casablanca

- Napa, United States

Chillán

- Mürzzuschlag, Austria
- Río Cuarto, Argentina

Chimbarongo

- Tequila, Mexico

La Cisterna

- Bethlehem, Palestine

Concepción

- Bethlehem, Palestine
- Campinas, Brazil
- Medellín, Colombia
- Monterrey, Mexico
- Nanjing, China
- La Plata, Argentina
- San Miguel de Tucumán, Argentina
- Wuhan, China

Conchalí

- Leganés, Spain

Las Condes

- Bethlehem, Palestine
- Miraflores, Peru
- Petah Tikva, Israel

Coquimbo

- Elbląg, Poland
- San Juan, Argentina

== E ==
Easter Island

- Maui County, United States
- Torsby, Sweden

Estación Central

- Jericho, Palestine

== I ==
Iquique

- Arequipa, Peru
- Ashkelon, Israel
- Dourados, Brazil
- Miami-Dade County, United States
- Nanning, China
- Taizhou, China
- Vitória, Brazil
- Zadar, Croatia

== M ==
Melipilla

- Cubatão, Brazil
- Itajaí, Brazil

== O ==
Osorno

- Bariloche, Argentina
- Blumenau, Brazil

== P ==
Padre Las Casas

- Tequila, Mexico

Pedro Aguirre Cerda

- Laval, Canada

Pudahuel

- Rubí, Spain

Puerto Montt

- Bariloche, Argentina
- Qingdao, China

Punta Arenas

- Bellingham, United States
- Harbin, China
- Río Gallegos, Argentina
- Ushuaia, Argentina

Purranque

- Bariloche, Argentina

Puerto Varas

- Abbottabad, Pakistan
- Bariloche, Argentina
- Gramado, Brazil
- Maldonado, Uruguay

Puyehue

- Tecámac, Mexico

== Q ==
Quillota

- Cáceres, Spain

== R ==
Rancagua

- Logroño, Spain
- Paju, South Korea
- San Francisco, Argentina

== S ==
San Felipe

- Zapotlán el Grande, Mexico

San Fernando

- Afula, Israel

San Pedro de Atacama

- Magdalena, United States
- Yokneam Illit, Israel

Santa Cruz

- Oaxaca de Juárez, Mexico

Santiago

- Beijing, China
- Buenos Aires, Argentina
- Guangzhou, China
- Kyiv, Ukraine
- London, England, United Kingdom
- Madrid, Spain
- Miami, United States
- Minneapolis, United States
- Riga, Latvia
- São Paulo, Brazil
- Tangier, Morocco

La Serena

- Changzhou, China
- Hawaii County, United States
- Kraków, Poland
- Millbrae, United States
- San Juan, Argentina
- Talavera de la Reina, Spain
- Tenri, Japan
- Tlalnepantla de Baz, Mexico

== T ==
Talcahuano

- Bahía Blanca, Argentina

Tocopilla

- Lawrence, United States

== V ==
Valparaíso

- Badalona, Spain
- Barcelona, Spain
- Bat Yam, Israel
- Busan, South Korea
- Callao, Peru
- Córdoba, Argentina
- Guangzhou, China
- Havana, Cuba
- Long Beach, United States
- Malacca, Malaysia
- Manzanillo, Mexico
- Medellín, Colombia
- Novorossiysk, Russia
- Oviedo, Spain
- Rosario, Argentina
- Salvador, Brazil
- Santa Fe, Spain
- Shanghai, China
- Veracruz, Mexico

Vicuña

- San Juan, Argentina

Villa Alemana

- Bethlehem, Palestine

Viña del Mar

- Changwon, South Korea
- Miraflores, Peru
- Sausalito, United States
- Wuxi, China

Vitacura

- Beyoğlu, Turkey
