= List of twin towns and sister cities in Egypt =

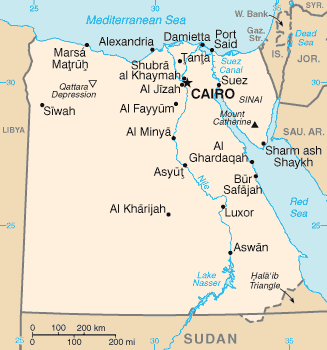
Map of Egypt

This is a list of municipalities in Egypt which have standing links to local communities in other countries. In most cases, the association, especially when formalised by local government, is known as "town twinning" (usually in Europe) or "sister cities" (usually in the rest of the world).

== A ==
Alexandria

- Alicante, Spain
- Almaty, Kazakhstan
- Baltimore, United States
- Bratislava, Slovakia
- Catania, Italy
- Cleveland, United States
- Constanța, Romania
- Durban, South Africa
- Incheon, South Korea
- Kazanlak, Bulgaria
- Limassol, Cyprus
- Novi Sad, Serbia
- Odesa, Ukraine
- Paphos, Cyprus
- Port Louis, Mauritius
- Saint Petersburg, Russia
- Shanghai, China
- Thessaloniki, Greece

Aswan

- Chongqing, China
- Sonoma, United States

== C ==
Cairo

- Abu Dhabi, United Arab Emirates
- Amman, Jordan
- Baghdad, Iraq
- Beijing, China
- Damascus, Syria
- East Jerusalem, Palestine
- Istanbul, Turkey
- Kairouan, Tunisia
- Khartoum, Sudan
- Muscat, Oman
- Palermo Province, Italy
- Rabat, Morocco
- Sanaa, Yemen
- Seoul, South Korea
- Stuttgart, Germany
- Tashkent, Uzbekistan
- (Georgia (country)) Tbilisi, Georgia
- Tokyo, Japan
- Tripoli, Libya

== F ==
Faiyum

- Haikou, China

== G ==
Giza

- Istanbul, Turkey
- Los Angeles, United States

== I ==
Ismailia

- Suzhou, China
- Svishtov, Bulgaria

== L ==
Luxor

- Baltimore, United States
- Brasília, Brazil
- (Georgia (country)) Kakheti, Georgia
- Kazanlak, Bulgaria
- Shenzhen, China
- Székesfehérvár, Hungary
- Viterbo, Italy
- Yangzhou, China

== M ==
Marsa Alam

- Jagodina, Serbia

Minya

- Hildesheim, Germany

== P ==
Port Said

- Bizerte, Tunisia
- Volgograd, Russia

== S ==
Sharm El-Sheikh

- Aqaba, Jordan
- (Georgia (country)) Batumi, Georgia
- Yalta, Ukraine

Suez

- Skopje, North Macedonia
