= List of twin towns and sister cities in South Africa =

Map of South Africa

This is a list of places in South Africa which have standing links to local communities in other countries. In most cases, the association, especially when formalised by local government, is known as "town twinning" (usually in Europe) or "sister cities" (usually in the rest of the world).

== B ==
Bergrivier

- Heist-op-den-Berg, Belgium

Bloemfontein

- Bhubaneswar, India
- Nanjing, China

Buffalo City

- Jinhua, China
- Leiden, Netherlands
- Milwaukee County, United States
- Oldenburg, Germany
- Qinhuangdao, China

== C ==
Cape Town

- Aachen, Germany
- Accra, Ghana
- Antwerp, Belgium
- Bujumbura, Burundi
- Cleveland, United States
- Dubai, United Arab Emirates
- Funchal, Portugal
- Haifa, Israel
- Hangzhou, China
- Maputo, Mozambique
- Malmö, Sweden
- Miami-Dade County, United States
- Monterrey, Mexico
- Rio de Janeiro, Brazil
- Saint Petersburg, Russia
- Varna, Bulgaria

== D ==
Dordrecht

- Dordrecht, Netherlands

Drakenstein

- Walvis Bay, Namibia

Durban

- Alexandria, Egypt
- Bremen, Germany
- Bulawayo, Zimbabwe
- Chicago, United States
- Daejeon, South Korea
- Guangzhou, China
- Kaohsiung, Taiwan
- Leeds, England, United Kingdom
- Libreville, Gabon
- Maputo, Mozambique
- Mersin, Turkey
- Mombasa, Kenya
- New Orleans, United States
- Oran, Algeria
- Le Port, Réunion, France

== E ==
East London

- Daqing, China

Ekurhuleni

- Harbin, China

== F ==
Franschhoek

- Dilbeek, Belgium

== G ==
George

- Saint Paul, United States
- Tacoma, United States

== I ==
iLembe

- Zhanjiang, China

== J ==
Johannesburg

- Addis Ababa, Ethiopia
- Birmingham, England, United Kingdom
- Ho Chi Minh City, Vietnam
- New York City, United States
- Ramallah, Palestine
- Taipei, Taiwan
- Verona, Italy
- Windhoek, Namibia

== M ==
Mbombela

- Baotou, China
- Maia, Portugal
- Mbabane, Eswatini

Mogale

- Wujiang (Suzhou), China

Mossel Bay

- Denpasar, Indonesia

Msunduzi

- Hampton, United States
- Taichung, Taiwan

== N ==
Nelson Mandela Bay

- Gothenburg, Sweden
- Jacksonville, United States
- Ningbo, China
- Tainan, Taiwan

Newcastle

- Nanchang, China
- Zibo, China

== O ==
Oudtshoorn

- Alphen aan den Rijn, Netherlands
- Hualien, Taiwan

Oukasie

- Berkeley, United States

== P ==
Polokwane

- Reggio Emilia, Italy

Pretoria

- Baku, Azerbaijan
- Bucharest, Romania
- Bulawayo, Zimbabwe
- Hanoi, Vietnam
- Kyiv, Ukraine
- Port Louis, Mauritius
- Taipei, Taiwan
- Tehran, Iran
- Washington, D.C., United States

== R ==
Ray Nkonyeni

- Oskarshamn, Sweden

Rustenburg – Mathopestad

- Berkeley, United States

== S ==
Sol Plaatje

- Changsha, China

Stellenbosch

- Paju, South Korea

== U ==
Upington

- Temora, Australia

== W ==
Witzenberg

- Bozhou, China
- Essen, Belgium

Worcester

- Aalst, Belgium
