= List of twin towns and sister cities in Albania =

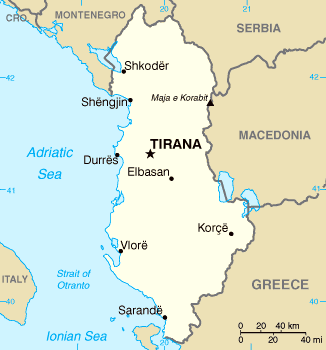
Map of Albania

This is a list of places in Albania which have standing links to local communities in other countries known as "town twinning" (usually in Europe) or "sister cities" (usually in the rest of the world).

== B ==
Berat

- Amasya, Turkey
- Bağcılar, Turkey
- Bérat, France
- Fermo, Italy
- Karmiel, Israel
- Lovech, Bulgaria
- Prizren, Kosovo
- Ulcinj, Montenegro

== D ==
Dropull

- Trikala, Greece

Durrës

- Bari, Italy
- Bitonto, Italy
- Istanbul, Turkey
- Thessaloniki, Greece
- Ulcinj, Montenegro

== E ==
Elbasan

- Dunaújváros, Hungary
- Osijek, Croatia

== F ==
Fier

- Cleveland, United States
- Lanzhou, China
- Peja, Kosovo

== G ==
Gjirokastër

- Grottammare, Italy
- Patras, Greece

Gramsh

- Plataci, Italy

== K ==
Kamëz

- Castenaso, Italy
- Macerata, Italy

Kavajë

- Saronikos, Greece

Korçë

- Los Alcázares, Spain
- Cluj-Napoca, Romania
- Mitrovica, Kosovo
- Thessaloniki, Greece

Krujë

- Cortona, Italy
- Portocannone, Italy
- Stari Grad (Sarajevo), Bosnia and Herzegovina

Kuçovë

- Ramla, Israel

Kukës

- Lyndhurst, United States

== P ==
Përmet

- Rahovec, Kosovo

Pogradec

- Ohrid, North Macedonia
- Wismar, Germany

Pukë

- Signa, Italy

== S ==
Sarandë

- Corfu, Greece
- Gjilan, Kosovo
- Larnaca, Cyprus
- Otranto, Italy
- Riccione, Italy
- Stavroupoli, Greece
- Suva Reka, Kosovo

Shkodër

- Cetinje, Montenegro
- Knin, Croatia
- Pécs, Hungary
- Üsküdar, Turkey
- Zeytinburnu, Turkey

== T ==
Tirana

- Ankara, Turkey
- Beijing, China
- Bursa, Turkey
- Doha, Qatar
- Florence, Italy
- Kharkiv, Ukraine
- Sarajevo, Bosnia and Herzegovina
- Skopje, North Macedonia

== V ==
Vlorë

- Hollywood, United States
- Yangzhou, China
