= List of twin towns and sister cities in Greece =

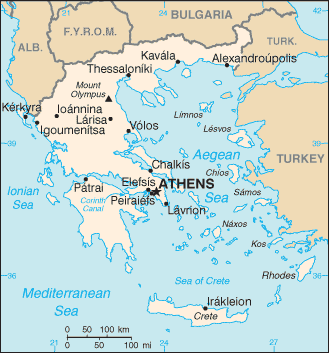
Map of Greece

This is a list of places in Greece which have standing links to local communities in other countries known as "town twinning" (usually in Europe) or "sister cities" (usually in the rest of the world).

== A ==
Agia Paraskevi

- Geroskipou, Cyprus
- Saint-Brieuc, France

Aigio

- Alba Iulia, Romania
- Capaccio Paestum, Italy
- Kalavryta, Greece
- Kyrenia, Cyprus

Alexandroupoli

- Burgas, Bulgaria
- Lakatamia, Cyprus
- Simferopol, Ukraine
- Sosnovy Bor, Russia
- Vyborg (Saint Petersburg), Russia

Athens

- Ashgabat, Turkmenistan
- Athens, United States
- Barcelona, Spain
- Beijing, China
- Bethlehem, Palestine
- Bucharest, Romania
- Buenos Aires, Argentina
- Chicago, United States
- Cusco, Peru
- Famagusta, Cyprus
- Kyiv, Ukraine
- Ljubljana, Slovenia
- Los Angeles, United States
- Montreal, Canada
- New York City, United States
- Nicosia, Cyprus
- Rio de Janeiro, Brazil
- Seoul, South Korea
- Washington, D.C., United States

== C ==
Chalandri

- Calimera, Italy
- Enfield, England, United Kingdom
- Harbin, China
- Nablus, Palestine

Chania

- Axioupoli, Greece
- Engomi, Cyprus
- Ermoupoli, Greece
- Famagusta, Cyprus
- Karpathos, Greece
- Paphos, Cyprus
- Polis, Cyprus
- Wellington, New Zealand

Corfu

- Asha, Cyprus
- Bari, Italy
- Belgrade, Serbia
- Bethlehem, United States
- Famagusta, Cyprus
- Ioannina, Greece
- Kruševac, Serbia
- Meissen, Germany
- Novi Sad, Serbia
- Paphos, Cyprus
- Parma, Italy
- Sarandë, Albania
- Tai'an, China
- Tremetousia, Cyprus
- Troisdorf, Germany
- Vathy, Greece

== D ==
Drama

- Lauf an der Pegnitz, Germany

== E ==
Eleusis

- Gela, Italy

== H ==
Heraklion

- Čukarica (Belgrade), Serbia
- Limassol, Cyprus
- Nizhny Novgorod, Russia
- Tampa, United States
- Toledo, Spain

== I ==
Igoumenitsa

- Velbert, Germany

Ilioupoli

- Heliopolis (Cairo), Egypt
- Iași, Romania
- Larnaca, Cyprus
- Novi Sad, Serbia

== K ==
Kalamata

- Aglandjia, Cyprus
- Amioun, Lebanon
- Bizerte, Tunisia
- Lowell, United States
- Missolonghi, Greece
- Râmnicu Vâlcea, Romania
- West Torrens, Australia
- Xi'an, China

Kallithea

- Ferrara, Italy
- Gelendzhik, Russia
- Prague 5 (Prague), Czech Republic
- Sartrouville, France

Kalymnos

- Arles, France
- Chieti, Italy
- Darwin, Australia
- Lakatamia, Cyprus
- Mariupol, Ukraine
- Tarpon Springs, United States

Katerini

- Brăila, Romania
- Čačak, Serbia
- Maintal, Germany
- Moosburg, Austria
- Surgut, Russia

Kavala

- Aranđelovac, Serbia
- Durham, United States
- Gradiška, Bosnia and Herzegovina
- Nuremberg, Germany
- Tarancón, Spain

Keratsini

- Prešov, Slovakia

Kolindros is a member of the Charter of European Rural Communities, a town twinning association across the European Union, alongside with:

- Bienvenida, Spain
- Bièvre, Belgium
- Bucine, Italy
- (Republic of Ireland) Cashel, Ireland
- Cissé, France
- Desborough, England, United Kingdom
- Esch (Haaren), Netherlands
- Hepstedt, Germany
- Ibănești, Romania
- Kandava (Tukums), Latvia
- Kannus, Finland
- Lassee, Austria
- Medzev, Slovakia
- Næstved, Denmark
- Nagycenk, Hungary
- Nadur, Malta
- Ockelbo, Sweden
- Pano Lefkara, Cyprus
- Põlva, Estonia
- Samuel (Soure), Portugal
- Starý Poddvorov, Czech Republic
- Strzyżów, Poland
- Svoge, Bulgaria
- Tisno, Croatia
- Troisvierges, Luxembourg
- Žagarė (Joniškis), Lithuania

Komotini

- Kardzhali, Bulgaria
- Yalova, Turkey
- Yıldırım, Turkey

== L ==
Lamia

- Chioggia, Italy
- Mytilene, Greece
- Rzeszów, Poland

Larissa

- Anapa, Russia
- Bălți, Moldova
- Banská Bystrica, Slovakia
- Foča, Bosnia and Herzegovina
- Knoxville, United States
- Kos, Greece
- Larnaca, Cyprus
- Rybnik, Poland
- Stara Zagora, Bulgaria

Laurium

- Aleksinac, Serbia
- Mangalia, Romania
- Oia, Greece
- Plomari, Greece
- Quimper, France

Lefkada

- Emmaboda, Sweden
- Leucate, France
- Nahariya, Israel
- Paralimni, Cyprus
- Ploiești, Romania
- Prymorsky District (Odesa), Ukraine
- Shinjuku (Tokyo), Japan

== M ==
Mouresi

- Aradippou, Cyprus
- Mollaj (Korcë), Albania

Mytilene

- Brod, Bosnia and Herzegovina
- Kalamaria, Greece
- Lamia, Greece
- Paphos, Cyprus
- Portland, United States
- Preveza, Greece
- Setouchi, Japan

== N ==
Naousa

- Asenovgrad, Bulgaria
- Missolonghi, Greece
- Paros, Greece
- Podgorica, Montenegro
- Zgorzelec, Poland

Nea Anchialos

- Pomorie, Bulgaria

Nea Ionia

- Alanya, Turkey
- Lefkoniko, Cyprus
- Martina Franca, Italy

== P ==
Patmos

- Auderghem, Belgium
- Glastonbury, England, United Kingdom
- Grottaferrata, Italy

Patras

- Banja Luka, Bosnia and Herzegovina
- Bari, Italy
- Byblos, Lebanon
- Bydgoszcz, Poland
- Debrecen, Hungary
- Famagusta, Cyprus
- Gjirokastër, Albania
- Limassol, Cyprus
- Reggio Calabria, Italy
- Saint-Étienne, France
- Santa Barbara, United States
- Savannah, United States
- Wuxi, China

Perdika

- Jagodina, Serbia
- Paraćin, Serbia

Piraeus

- Baltimore, United States
- Galaţi, Romania
- Marseille, France
- Odesa, Ukraine
- Ostrava, Czech Republic
- Rosario, Argentina
- Saint Petersburg, Russia
- Shanghai, China
- Tartus, Syria
- Varna, Bulgaria
- Worcester, United States

Preveza is a member of the Douzelage, a town twinning association of towns across the European Union. Preveza also has other twin towns.

Douzelage

- Agros, Cyprus
- Altea, Spain
- Asikkala, Finland
- Bad Kötzting, Germany
- Bellagio, Italy
- (Republic of Ireland) Bundoran, Ireland
- Chojna, Poland
- Granville, France
- Holstebro, Denmark
- Houffalize, Belgium
- Judenburg, Austria
- Kőszeg, Hungary
- Marsaskala, Malta
- Meerssen, Netherlands
- Niederanven, Luxembourg
- Oxelösund, Sweden
- Rokiškis, Lithuania
- Rovinj, Croatia
- Sesimbra, Portugal
- Sherborne, England, United Kingdom
- Sigulda, Latvia
- Siret, Romania
- Škofja Loka, Slovenia
- Sušice, Czech Republic
- Tryavna, Bulgaria
- Türi, Estonia
- Zvolen, Slovakia

Other

- Mytilene, Greece
- Spišská Nová Ves, Slovakia

== R ==
Rethymno

- Ayia Napa, Cyprus
- Castenaso, Italy

Rhodes

- Ávila, Spain
- Conches-en-Ouche, France
- Gotland, Sweden
- Limassol, Cyprus
- New Braunfels, United States
- Perth, Australia
- Pisa, Italy
- Rhode Island, United States
- Roses, Spain
- Valletta, Malta
- Yalta, Ukraine

== S ==
Salamina

- Famagusta, Cyprus

Samos

- Megara, Greece
- Metaponto (Bernalda), Italy

Serres

- Fosses, France
- Petrich, Bulgaria
- Veliko Tarnovo, Bulgaria

Skiathos

- Formentera, Spain
- Newport, United States

Skopelos

- Atarfe, Spain

Sparta

- Lapithos, Cyprus
- Merri-bek, Australia
- Morphou, Cyprus
- Le Plessis-Trévise, France
- Sopron, Hungary
- Stamford, United States
- Tanagura, Japan
- Taranto, Italy

Spetses

- Bailén, Spain

Syvota

- Locorotondo, Italy

== T ==
Thessaloniki

- Alexandria, Egypt
- Bologna, Italy
- Bratislava, Slovakia
- Busan, South Korea
- Cologne, Germany
- Constanţa, Romania
- Durrës, Albania
- Hartford, United States
- Kolkata, India
- Korçë, Albania
- Leipzig, Germany
- Limassol, Cyprus
- Melbourne, Australia
- Nice, France
- Plovdiv, Bulgaria
- San Francisco, United States
- Tel Aviv, Israel

Triandria

- Bansko, Bulgaria
- Maasmechelen, Belgium
- Mesa Geitonia, Cyprus
- San Giorgio Ionico, Italy

Trikala

- Amberg, Germany
- Antiparos, Greece
- Banan (Chongqing), China
- Castrop-Rauxel, Germany
- Dropull, Albania
- Pyatigorsk, Russia
- Talence, France
- Tucson, United States
- Vranje, Serbia

Tripoli

- Arcadia, United States
- Missolonghi, Greece
- Paralimni, Cyprus
- Peine, Germany

== V ==
Volos

- Antofagasta, Chile
- (Georgia (country)) Batumi, Georgia
- Le Mans, France
- Pleven, Bulgaria
- Rostov-on-Don, Russia
- Smederevo, Serbia

== X ==
Xanthi

- Beşiktaş, Turkey
- Biga, Turkey
- Gifhorn, Germany
- New Belgrade (Belgrade), Serbia
- Smolyan, Bulgaria

== Z ==
Zakynthos

- Kiryat Bialik, Israel
- Limassol, Cyprus
- Pavia, Italy
- Serravalle, San Marino
- Sulmona, Italy
- Yevpatoria, Ukraine

Zitsa

- Nardò, Italy
