= List of twin towns and sister cities in Luxembourg =

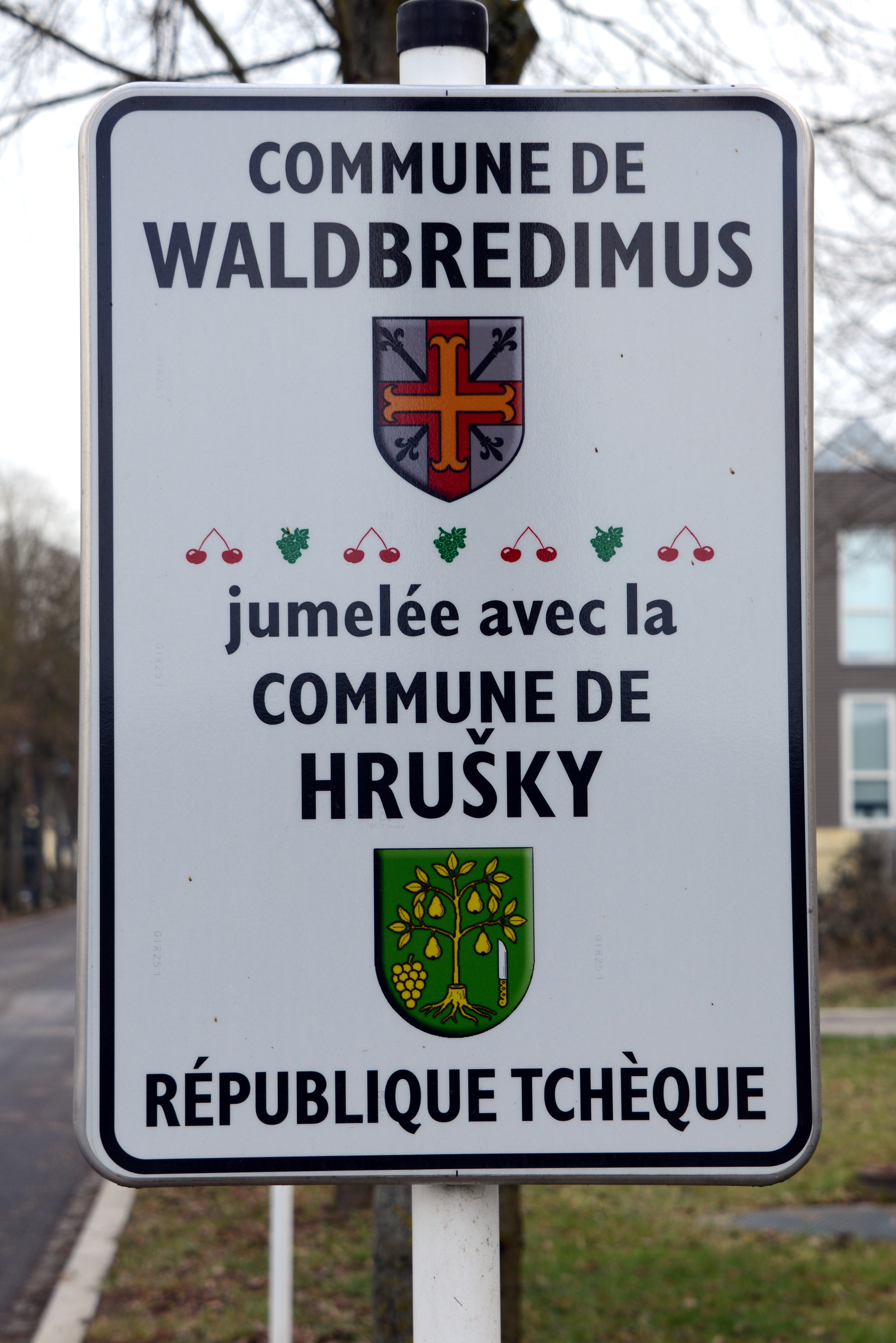
Twin town of Waldbredimus

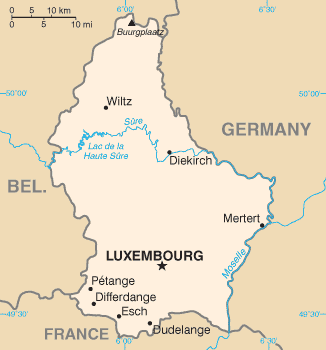
Map of Luxembourg

This is a list of municipalities in Luxembourg which have standing links to local communities in other countries known as "town twinning" (usually in Europe) or "sister cities" (usually in the rest of the world).

== B ==
Beckerich

- Iváncsa, Hungary

Bertrange

- Santa Maria Nuova, Italy

Bettembourg

- Flaibano, Italy
- Valpaços, Portugal

Bettendorf

- Vila Pouca de Aguiar, Portugal

Bourscheid

- Burscheid, Germany

== C ==
Clervaux

- Horezu, Romania
- Eijsden-Margraten, Netherlands

Colmar-Berg

- Weilburg, Germany

Consdorf

- Nazaré, Portugal

== D ==
Diekirch

- Arlon, Belgium
- Bitburg, Germany
- Hayange, France
- Liberty, United States
- Monthey, Switzerland

Differdange

- Ahlen, Germany
- Chaves, Portugal
- Fiuminata, Italy
- Longwy, France
- Oxford, United States

Dippach

- Landiras, France

Dudelange

- Arganil, Portugal
- Berane, Montenegro
- Feltre, Italy
- Lauenburg, Germany
- Lębork, Poland
- Manom, France

== E ==
Esch-sur-Alzette

- Coimbra, Portugal
- Cologne, Germany
- Liège, Belgium
- Lille, France
- Mödling, Austria
- Offenbach am Main, Germany
- Puteaux, France
- Rotterdam, Netherlands
- Turin, Italy
- Velletri, Italy
- Zemun (Belgrade), Serbia

== F ==
Frisange

- Saint-Julien-de-Coppel, France

== G ==
Grevenmacher

- Aubière, France

== H ==
Helperknapp

- Zechin, Germany

Hesperange

- Malchin, Germany
- Szerencs, Hungary

== J ==
Junglinster

- La Crosse, United States
- Üdersdorf, Germany

== K ==
Käerjeng

- Gaflenz, Austria

Kehlen

- Meckenbeuren, Germany

== L ==
Lintgen

- Lorup, Germany
- Lubomino, Poland
- Vrees, Germany

Luxembourg

- Metz, France

== M ==
Mamer

- Dangé-Saint-Romain, France

Mersch – Beringen

- Behringen (Bispingen), Germany
- Behringen (Hörselberg-Hainich), Germany
- Behringen (Stadtilm), Germany
- Beringe (Peel en Maas), Netherlands
- Beringen, Belgium
- Beringen, Switzerland

Mertzig

- Vöcklamarkt, Austria

Mondorf-les-Bains

- Bad Homburg vor der Höhe, Germany
- Cabourg, France
- Chur, Switzerland
- Mayrhofen, Austria
- Terracina, Italy
- Vale de Cambra, Portugal

== N ==
Niederanven is a member of the Douzelage, a town twinning association of towns across the European Union, along with:

- Agros, Cyprus
- Altea, Spain
- Asikkala, Finland
- Bad Kötzting, Germany
- Bellagio, Italy
- (Republic of Ireland) Bundoran, Ireland
- Chojna, Poland
- Granville, France
- Holstebro, Denmark
- Houffalize, Belgium
- Judenburg, Austria
- Kőszeg, Hungary
- Marsaskala, Malta
- Meerssen, Netherlands
- Oxelösund, Sweden
- Preveza, Greece
- Rokiškis, Lithuania
- Rovinj, Croatia
- Sesimbra, Portugal
- Sherborne, England, United Kingdom
- Sigulda, Latvia
- Siret, Romania
- Škofja Loka, Slovenia
- Sušice, Czech Republic
- Tryavna, Bulgaria
- Türi, Estonia
- Zvolen, Slovakia

== P ==
Pétange

- Maribor, Slovenia
- Schiffweiler, Germany
- Schio, Italy

Préizerdaul

- Péni, Burkina Faso
- San Agustín, El Salvador

== R ==
Remich

- Bessan, France

Roeser

- Turi, Italy
- Zoufftgen, France

Rosport-Mompach

- Velence, Hungary

Rumelange

- Petnjica, Montenegro

== S ==
Sanem

- Chauffailles, France

Schengen

- Ischgl, Austria

Schifflange

- Drusenheim, France

Schuttrange

- Siegelsbach, Germany

== T ==
Troisvierges is a member of the Charter of European Rural Communities, a town twinning association across the European Union, along with:

- Bienvenida, Spain
- Bièvre, Belgium
- Bucine, Italy
- (Republic of Ireland) Cashel, Ireland
- Cissé, France
- Desborough, England, United Kingdom
- Esch (Haaren), Netherlands
- Hepstedt, Germany
- Ibănești, Romania
- Kandava (Tukums), Latvia
- Kannus, Finland
- Kolindros, Greece
- Lassee, Austria
- Medzev, Slovakia
- Næstved, Denmark
- Nagycenk, Hungary
- Nadur, Malta
- Ockelbo, Sweden
- Pano Lefkara, Cyprus
- Põlva, Estonia
- Samuel (Soure), Portugal
- Starý Poddvorov, Czech Republic
- Strzyżów, Poland
- Svoge, Bulgaria
- Tisno, Croatia
- Žagarė (Joniškis), Lithuania

== V ==
Vianden

- Compiègne, France
- Huy, Belgium

== W ==
Waldbredimus

- Hrušky, Czech Republic

Walferdange

- Limana, Italy
- Longuyon, France
- Schmitshausen, Germany

Wiltz

- Celorico de Basto, Portugal
- Zavidovići, Bosnia and Herzegovina

Wormeldange

- Mortágua, Portugal
