= List of twin towns and sister cities in Morocco =

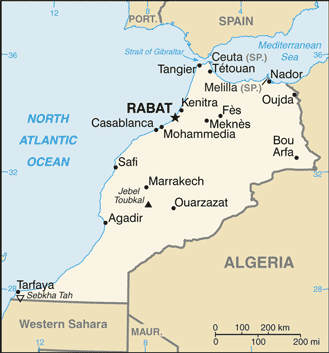
Map of Morocco

This is a list of municipalities in Morocco which have standing links to local communities in other countries known as "town twinning" (usually in Europe) or "sister cities" (usually in the rest of the world).

== A ==
Agadir

- Gaza City, Palestine
- Hangzhou, China
- Pleven, Bulgaria
- Portsmouth, United States

Ahfir

- Hérouville-Saint-Clair, France

Asilah

- Albuñol, Spain
- Sintra, Portugal

== B ==
Berkane

- Bondy, France
- Perpignan, France
- Saint-Gilles, Belgium
- Zeist, Netherlands

Berrechid

- Çekmeköy, Turkey

== C ==
Casablanca

- Bordeaux, France
- Busan, South Korea
- Chicago, United States
- Dakar, Senegal
- Dubai, United Arab Emirates
- Jakarta, Indonesia
- Kuala Lumpur, Malaysia
- Muscat, Oman
- Nouadhibou, Mauritania
- Shanghai, China

Chefchaouen

- Dijon, France
- Issaquah, United States
- Kunming, China

== D ==
Deroua

- Ümraniye, Turkey

== E ==
Essaouira

- Cascais, Portugal
- Changshu, China
- La Rochelle, France

== F ==
Fez

- Bobo-Dioulasso, Burkina Faso
- Chengdu, China
- Coimbra, Portugal
- Córdoba, Spain
- East Jerusalem, Palestine
- Florence, Italy
- Jericho, Palestine
- Kairouan, Tunisia
- Kraków, Poland
- Lahore, Pakistan
- Montpellier, France
- Saint-Louis, Senegal
- Suwon, South Korea
- Wuxi, China
- Xi'an, China

Figuig

- Stains, France

== H ==
El Hajeb

- Council Bluffs, United States

Al Hoceima

- Albuñol, Spain
- Sint-Niklaas, Belgium

== I ==
Ifrane

- Albuñol, Spain

== J ==
El Jadida

- Arenzano, Italy
- Barcelos, Portugal
- Nabeul, Tunisia
- Sète, France
- Sintra, Portugal
- Varennes, Canada
- Vierzon, France
- Tacoma, United States

== K ==
Kenitra

- Bergerac, France
- Gaziantep, Turkey
- Hammam-Lif, Tunisia
- Karatay, Turkey
- Sancaktepe, Turkey
- Santa Maria da Feira, Portugal
- Santos, Brazil
- Tavira, Portugal

Ksar el-Kebir

- Lagos, Portugal

== L ==
Larache

- Compiègne, France

== M ==
Marrakesh

- Granada, Spain
- Marseille, France
- Ningbo, China
- Scottsdale, United States
- Seville, Spain
- Sousse, Tunisia
- Timbuktu, Mali

M'diq

- Frontignan, France

Meknes

- Cenon, France
- Nîmes, France
- Santarém, Portugal
- Tulkarm, Palestine

Mohammedia

- Ghent, Belgium
- Oeiras, Portugal

Moulay Yacoub

- Aix-les-Bains, France

== O ==
Ouarzazate

- Maubeuge, France

Oujda

- East Jerusalem, Palestine
- Grenoble, France
- Lille, France
- Molenbeek-Saint-Jean, Belgium
- Trowbridge, England, United Kingdom

== R ==
Rabat

- Bethlehem, Palestine
- Cairo, Egypt
- Guangzhou, China
- Honolulu, United States
- Istanbul, Turkey
- Lisbon, Portugal
- Lyon, France
- Madrid, Spain
- Nablus, Palestine
- Tunis, Tunisia

== S ==
Safi

- Boulogne-sur-Mer, France
- Montereau-Fault-Yonne, France
- Salaberry-de-Valleyfield, Canada
- Setúbal, Portugal
- Sfax, Tunisia

Salé

- Aryanah, Tunisia
- Beitunia, Palestine
- Gandiaye, Senegal
- Grand Yoff, Senegal
- Maroua, Cameroon
- Portalegre, Portugal
- Tlaxcala de Xicohténcatl, Mexico

Settat

- La Celle-Saint-Cloud, France
- Yinchuan, China

Skhirat

- Betz, France

== T ==
Tangier

- Algeciras, Spain
- Bizerte, Tunisia
- Cádiz, Spain
- Da Nang, Vietnam
- Faro, Portugal
- Liège, Belgium
- Metz, France
- Puteaux, France
- Saint-Denis, Réunion, France
- Saint-Josse-ten-Noode, Belgium
- Santiago, Chile
- Sétif, Algeria

Tétouan

- Granada, Spain
- Khan Yunis, Palestine
- Monastir, Tunisia
- Terrassa, Spain

Tiznit

- İzmit, Turkey
- Saint-Denis, France
- Somerville, United States

== Z ==
Zagora

- Chapelle-lez-Herlaimont, Belgium
