= List of twin towns and sister cities in Montenegro =

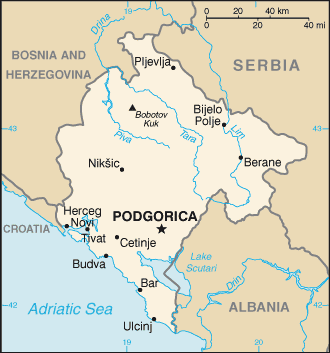
Map of Montenegro

This is a list of municipalities in Montenegro which have standing links to local communities in other countries known as "town twinning" (usually in Europe) or "sister cities" (usually in the rest of the world).

== B ==
Bar

- Bor, Serbia
- Bornova, Turkey
- Hongkou (Shanghai), China
- Küçükkuyu (Ayvacık), Turkey
- Kula, Serbia
- Kursk, Russia
- Kragujevac, Serbia
- Mali Iđoš, Serbia
- Požarevac, Serbia
- Vodnjan, Croatia

Berane

- Çiğli, Turkey
- Čukarica (Belgrade), Serbia
- Dudelange, Luxembourg
- Karaisalı, Turkey
- Kostromskoy District, Russia
- Peja, Kosovo
- Staro Nagoričane, North Macedonia
- Teramo, Italy
- Vrnjačka Banja, Serbia
- Zavidovići, Bosnia and Herzegovina

Bijelo Polje

- Bila Tserkva, Ukraine
- Burhaniye, Turkey
- Hrubieszów, Poland
- Maardu, Estonia
- Strumica, North Macedonia
- Svishtov, Bulgaria

Budva

- Banská Bystrica, Slovakia
- Bijeljina, Bosnia and Herzegovina
- Celje, Slovenia
- Eastern AO (Moscow), Russia
- Kamnik, Slovenia
- Laktaši, Bosnia and Herzegovina
- Makarska, Croatia
- Novi Sad, Serbia
- Ohrid, North Macedonia
- Pakrac, Croatia
- Petacciato, Italy
- Prague 4 (Prague), Czech Republic
- Stari Grad (Sarajevo), Bosnia and Herzegovina
- Valašské Meziříčí, Czech Republic
- Velika Plana, Serbia
- Vrnjačka Banja, Serbia
- West Palm Beach, United States
- Yalova, Turkey

== C ==
Cetinje

- Alba Iulia, Romania
- Gaziantep, Turkey
- Kharkiv, Ukraine
- Kostroma, Russia
- Larnaca, Cyprus
- Mali Iđoš, Serbia
- Nafplio, Greece
- Novo Sarajevo (Sarajevo), Bosnia and Herzegovina
- Rijeka, Croatia
- Santa Severina, Italy
- Shkodër, Albania
- Sinaia, Romania
- Spoleto, Italy
- Velika Kladuša, Bosnia and Herzegovina
- Veliko Tarnovo, Bulgaria
- Vranje, Serbia
- West Achaea, Greece

== D ==
Danilovgrad

- Crvenka (Kula), Serbia
- Grodzisk Mazowiecki, Poland
- Roosendaal, Netherlands

== H ==
Herceg Novi

- Bačka Topola, Serbia
- Barletta, Italy
- Beočin, Serbia
- Čajetina, Serbia
- Kranj, Slovenia
- Mali Zvornik, Serbia
- Novo Mesto, Slovenia
- Prizren, Kosovo
- Vauréal, France
- Volgorechensk, Russia
- Zemun (Belgrade), Serbia

== K ==
Kolašin

- Lovech, Bulgaria
- Prijepolje, Serbia
- Slovianoserbsk, Ukraine

Kotor

- Campomarino, Italy
- Gaziantep, Turkey
- Nesebar, Bulgaria
- Přerov, Czech Republic
- Santa Barbara, United States
- Stari Grad (Belgrade), Serbia
- Szeged, Hungary
- Trogir, Croatia
- Xi'an, China

== N ==
Nikšić

- Arilje, Serbia
- Bileća, Bosnia and Herzegovina
- Chifeng, China
- Foča, Bosnia and Herzegovina
- Gacko, Bosnia and Herzegovina
- Istočno Novo Sarajevo (Istočno Sarajevo), Bosnia and Herzegovina
- Koprivnica, Croatia
- Kumanovo, North Macedonia
- Lazarevac (Belgrade), Serbia
- Nevesinje, Bosnia and Herzegovina
- Trebinje, Bosnia and Herzegovina
- Vrbas, Serbia
- Želino, North Macedonia

== P ==
Petnjica

- Rumelange, Luxembourg

Plav

- Deçan, Kosovo

Pljevlja

- Gračanica, Bosnia and Herzegovina
- Paraćin, Serbia
- Velenje, Slovenia

Plužine

- Kraljevo, Serbia

Podgorica

- Ankara, Turkey
- Bari, Italy
- Naousa, Greece
- Sarajevo, Bosnia and Herzegovina
- Skopje, North Macedonia

== R ==
Rožaje

- Bayrampaşa, Turkey
- Betton, France
- Kavadarci, North Macedonia
- Kütahya, Turkey
- Pfäffikon, Switzerland
- Pernik, Bulgaria

== T ==
Tivat

- Aleksin, Russia
- Jiading (Shanghai), China
- Karpoš (Skopje), North Macedonia
- Konjic, Bosnia and Herzegovina
- Mola di Bari, Italy
- Novi Sad, Serbia
- Piran, Slovenia
- San Giacomo degli Schiavoni, Italy
- Sremski Karlovci, Serbia
- Trogir, Croatia
- Ub, Serbia

Tuzi

- Rochester Hills, United States

== U ==
Ulcinj

- Berat, Albania
- Deçan, Kosovo
- Durrës, Albania
- Liesing (Vienna), Austria
- Lukavac, Bosnia and Herzegovina
- Serik, Turkey
- Stari Grad (Sarajevo), Bosnia and Herzegovina
- Staten Island (New York City), United States
- Uzhhorod, Ukraine
