= List of twin towns and sister cities in Oceania =

This is a list of places in the continent of Oceania which have standing links to local communities in other countries. In most cases, the association, especially when formalised by local government, is known as "town twinning" (usually in Europe) or "sister cities" (usually in the rest of the world).

== American Samoa ==
Pago Pago

- Oceanside, United States

== Federated States of Micronesia ==
Rull

- Zhongshan, China

== Fiji ==
Lautoka

- Jiangmen, China

Nadi

- Hangzhou, China

Nailuva

- Des Plaines, United States

Nasinu

- Shefa Province, Vanuatu

Suva

- Beihai, China
- Brighton, Australia
- Frankston, Australia
- Guangdong, China
- Port Moresby, Papua New Guinea
- Yongsan (Seoul), South Korea

== French Polynesia ==
Arue

- Le Mont-Dore, New Caledonia

Bora-Bora

- Port Vila, Vanuatu

Faaa

- Jiangyin, China

Huahine

- Boulouparis, New Caledonia

Mahina

- Gisborne, New Zealand

Nuku-Hiva

- Le Mont-Dore, New Caledonia

Paea

- Lifou, New Caledonia
- Sarraméa, New Caledonia

Papeete

- Changning (Shanghai), China
- Nice, France
- Nouméa, New Caledonia

Pīraʻe

- Païta, New Caledonia

Punaauia

- Dumbéa, New Caledonia

Taiʻarapu-Ouest

- Nagaoka, Japan
- Soorts-Hossegor, France

Taputapuatea

- Whangarei, New Zealand

Tumaraa

- Whangarei, New Zealand

Uturoa

- Whangarei, New Zealand

== Guam ==
Hagåtña

- Guadalajara, Mexico

== Marshall Islands ==
Aur Atoll

- Taoyuan, Taiwan

Jaluit Atoll

- New Taipei, Taiwan

Kwajalein Atoll

- Taichung, Taiwan

Majuro

- Honolulu, United States
- Kawai, Japan
- Taipei, Taiwan

Wotje Atoll

- Tainan, Taiwan

== Micronesia ==
Pohnpei

- Neosho, United States

== New Caledonia ==
Boulouparis

- Banana, Australia
- Huahine, French Polynesia

Dumbéa

- Fréjus, France
- Lifou, New Caledonia
- Port Vila, Vanuatu
- Poum, New Caledonia
- Punaauia, French Polynesia

Lifou

- Dumbéa, New Caledonia
- Paea, French Polynesia
- Port Vila, Vanuatu

Le Mont-Dore

- Arue, French Polynesia
- Belep, New Caledonia
- Luganville, Vanuatu
- Nuku-Hiva, French Polynesia
- Pouébo, New Caledonia
- Sunshine Coast, Australia
- Yogyakarta, Indonesia

Nouméa

- Gold Coast, Australia
- Nice, France
- Papeete, French Polynesia
- Taupō, New Zealand

== Northern Mariana Islands ==
Saipan

- Maui County, United States

Tinian

- Tublay, Philippines

== Palau ==
Airai

- Hsinchu, Taiwan

Koror

- Angeles City, Philippines
- Gilroy, United States
- Kaohsiung, Taiwan

== Papua New Guinea ==
Kokopo

- Mount Barker, Australia

Lae

- Cairns, Australia

Madang

- Batangas, Philippines

Mount Hagen

- Orange, Australia

Port Moresby

- Jinan, China
- Suva, Fiji
- Townsville, Australia

Tari

- Bandō, Japan

Vanimo

- Jayapura, Indonesia

== Samoa ==
Apia

- Compton, United States
- Huizhou, China
- Shenzhen, China

== Solomon Islands ==
Honiara

- Luganville, Vanuatu
- Mackay, Australia
- Port Vila, Vanuatu

== Tonga ==
Haʻapai

- Dongguan, China

Nukuʻalofa

- Whitby, England, United Kingdom

== Vanuatu ==
Luganville

- Honiara, Solomon Islands
- Le Mont-Dore, New Caledonia
- Zhuhai, China

Port Vila

- Bora-Bora, French Polynesia
- Dumbéa, New Caledonia
- Foshan, China
- Honiara, Solomon Islands
- Lifou, New Caledonia
- Shanghai, China
- Yinchuan, China
