= List of twin towns and sister cities in Europe =

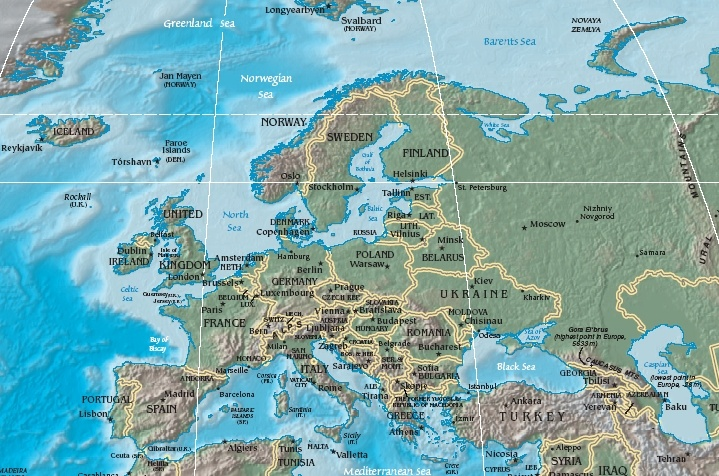
Map of Europe

This is a list of twin towns and sister cities in the continent of Europe – that is, pairs of local government entities in different countries which have twinning arrangements.

== Andorra ==
Andorra la Vella

- Foix, France
- Sant Pol de Mar, Spain
- Valls, Spain

Encamp

- Alghero, Italy
- Mojácar, Spain

== Gibraltar ==
Gibraltar

- Ballymena, Northern Ireland, United Kingdom
- Funchal, Portugal
- Goole, England, United Kingdom
- Kingston, Jamaica

== Jersey ==
St Brelade

- Granville, France

St Clement

- Cancale, France

St Helier

- Avranches, France
- Bad Wurzach, Germany
- Funchal, Portugal

St Saviour

- Villedieu-les-Poêles-Rouffigny, France

== Monaco ==
Monaco

- Dolceacqua, Italy
- Lucciana, France
- Ostend, Belgium

== San Marino ==
Acquaviva

- Froges, France

Borgo Maggiore

- Catania, Italy
- Żurrieq, Malta

Faetano

- Pont-à-Vendin, France

Montegiardino

- Bléré, France
- Rab, Croatia

San Marino

- Nanjing, China
- Rab, Croatia
- San Leo, Italy

Serravalle

- Chiusi della Verna, Italy
- Huangshan, China
- Sulmona, Italy
- Tolentino, Italy
- (Greece) Zakynthos, Grece
