= List of twin towns and sister cities in North America =

This is a list of places in the continent of North America which have standing links to local communities in other countries, known as "town twinning" (usually in Europe) or "sister cities" (usually in the rest of the world).

== Antigua and Barbuda ==
St. John's

- Jersey City, United States
- Waltham Forest, England, United Kingdom

== Aruba ==
Oranjestad

- Doral, United States

== Bahamas ==
Cat Island

- Richton Park, United States

Central Eleuthera – Gregory Town

- Jensen Beach, United States

Freeport

- Concord, United States
- Winston-Salem, United States

Green Turtle Cay

- Key West, United States

Hope Town

- Stuart, United States

Nassau

- Detroit, United States
- Winston-Salem, United States

== Barbados ==
Bridgetown

- New York City, United States
- Wilmington, United States

Speightstown

- Charleston, United States
- Reading, England, United Kingdom

== Belize ==
Belize City

- Ann Arbor, United States
- Evanston, United States
- Kaohsiung, Taiwan

Belmopan

- Taipei, Taiwan

Orange Walk Town

- Taoyuan, Taiwan

Punta Gorda

- Prairie View, United States

San Pedro

- Othón P. Blanco, Mexico
- Wilmington, United States

== Bermuda ==
St. George's

- Jamestown, United States
- Lyme Regis, England, United Kingdom

== Costa Rica ==
Abangares

- Ciudad Valles, Mexico

Alajuela

- Bordano, Italy
- Downey, United States
- Guadalajara, Mexico
- Huixquilucan, Mexico
- Lahr, Germany
- Montegrotto Terme, Italy
- Santos, Brazil

Belén

- Caguas, Puerto Rico
- DeLand, United States
- Nicolás Romero, Mexico
- Quezaltepeque, El Salvador
- Rivas, Nicaragua

Cañas

- Liptál, Czech Republic
- Sanxiang, China

Cartago

- Kaohsiung, Taiwan
- Masaya, Nicaragua
- Oaxaca de Juárez, Mexico
- Qinghai, China
- Toluca, Mexico
- Zapopan, Mexico

La Cruz

- Laredo, United States

Escazú

- Pensacola, United States

Esparza

- İzmir, Turkey

Heredia

- Marietta, United States
- Santa Tecla, El Salvador

Jacó

- Aurora, United States

Liberia

- Tyler, United States

Limón

- Galați, Romania

Monteverde

- Estes Park, United States

Puntarenas

- Kesennuma, Japan

Quepos

- Fort Lauderdale, United States

San José

- Almaty, Kazakhstan
- Asunción, Paraguay
- Beijing, China
- Ecatepec, Mexico
- Guadalajara, Mexico
- Guangzhou, China
- Kfar Saba, Israel
- Madrid, Spain
- Mexico City, Mexico
- Miami-Dade County, United States
- Okayama, Japan
- Pontevedra, Spain
- Puebla, Mexico
- Puerto Vallarta, Mexico
- Rio de Janeiro, Brazil
- Saltillo, Mexico
- San Jose, United States
- Sichuan, China
- Taipei, Taiwan

Santa Ana

- Lima, Peru
- Marianao (Havana), Cuba
- Princes' Islands, Turkey

Santa Cruz

- El Oro, Mexico
- Santa Fe, Spain

Talamanca

- Montevideo, Uruguay

Tilarán

- Durham, United States
- Liptál, Czech Republic

Turrialba

- Rancho Cordova, United States

== Dominica ==
Roseau

- Waltham Forest, England, United Kingdom

== Dominican Republic ==
Los Alcarrizos

- Quartu Sant'Elena, Italy

Higüey

- Doral, United States
- Hollywood, United States

Puerto Plata

- Rochester, United States

La Romana

- Fort Lauderdale, United States

Salcedo

- Atlanta, United States

San Ignacio de Sabaneta

- Vezzani, France

San Pedro de Macorís

- Miami-Dade County, United States

Santiago

- Glendale, United States
- San Juan, Puerto Rico

Santo Domingo

- Asunción, Paraguay
- Buenos Aires, Argentina
- Cáceres, Spain
- Caracas, Venezuela
- Guadalajara, Mexico
- A Guarda, Spain
- Madrid, Spain
- Miami-Dade County, United States
- New York City, United States
- Pontevedra, Spain
- Rio de Janeiro, Brazil
- Rosario, Argentina
- Providence, United States
- St. Augustine, United States
- Taipei, Taiwan
- Tenerife, Spain

Santo Domingo Este

- Allentown, United States

Saona

- Savona, Italy

Sosúa

- North Miami Beach, United States

La Vega

- Borgo San Dalmazzo, Italy
- Toluca, Mexico

== El Salvador ==
Agua Caliente

- Concord, United States

Arcatao

- Madison, United States

Concepción de Ataco

- Elk Grove, United States
- Fountain Hills, United States

Mejicanos

- Guarulhos, Brazil

Nahulingo

- Montcada i Reixac, Spain

Nejapa

- Coslada, Spain

Quezaltepeque

- Belén, Costa Rica

San Agustín

- Préizerdaul, Luxembourg

San Antonio Los Ranchos

- Berkeley, United States

San José Las Flores

- Cambridge, United States

San Miguel

- Arlington County, United States

San Pedro Masahuat

- Watsonville, United States

San Salvador

- Doha, Qatar
- Dubai, United Arab Emirates
- Guadalajara, Mexico
- Laval, Canada
- Lima, Peru
- Los Angeles, United States
- Madrid, Spain
- Monterrey, Mexico
- Panama City, Panama
- Seville, Spain
- Taipei, Taiwan
- Washington, D.C., United States

Santa Ana

- Miramar, United States

Santa Tecla

- Coral Gables, United States
- Heredia, Costa Rica
- Granada, Nicaragua
- Nesodden, Norway
- Senica, Slovakia
- Tegucigalpa, Honduras

Segundo Montes

- Cleveland, United States

Sonsonate

- Segrate, Italy

Soyapango

- Manizales, Colombia

Suchitoto

- Prescott, United States

Tecoluca

- Terrassa, Spain

Las Vueltas

- Windsor, Canada

Yucuaiquín

- Somerville, United States

Zaragoza

- Zaragoza, Spain

== Greenland ==
Avannaata – Ilulissat

- Fredericia, Denmark
- Fuglafjørður, Faroe Islands
- Hafnarfjörður, Iceland

Avannaata – Upernavik

- Odense, Denmark

Qeqertalik

- Saint-Philippe, Réunion

Qeqertalik – Aasiaat

- Svendborg, Denmark

Qeqertalik – Qasigiannguit

- Skive, Denmark

Qeqqata

- Esbjerg, Denmark
- Fjarðabyggð, Iceland
- Frederikshavn, Denmark
- Iqaluit, Canada
- Klaksvík, Faroe Islands

Sermersooq

- Aalborg, Denmark
- Gentofte, Denmark
- Kópavogur, Iceland

== Grenada ==
St. George's

- Foshan, China
- Hackney, England, United Kingdom

== Guatemala ==
Aguacatán

- Moss, Norway

Almolonga

- Mission, United States

Amatitlán

- Gzhel, Russia

Antigua Guatemala

- Benito Juárez, Mexico
- Colonia del Sacramento, Uruguay
- Coral Gables, United States
- Gáldar, Spain
- Metepec, Mexico
- Oaxaca de Juárez, Mexico
- Puebla, Mexico
- Saint-Pierre, Martinique, France
- Tlaquepaque, Mexico
- Uruapan, Mexico
- Zapopan, Mexico

Ayutla

- Ángel Albino Corzo, Mexico

La Blanca

- Ángel Albino Corzo, Mexico

Catarina

- Ángel Albino Corzo, Mexico

Chiquimula

- Port Huron, United States

Coatepeque

- Ángel Albino Corzo, Mexico

Esquipulas

- Moroleón, Mexico

Ipala

- Riverdale Park, United States

Guatemala City

- Doral, United States
- Hollywood, United States
- Madrid, Spain
- Monterrey, Mexico
- Providence, United States
- Saltillo, Mexico
- San Juan, Puerto Rico
- Santa Cruz de Tenerife, Spain
- Taipei, Taiwan

La Libertad

- Palenque, Mexico
- San Cristóbal de las Casas, Mexico

Malacatán

- Ángel Albino Corzo, Mexico

Ocós

- Ángel Albino Corzo, Mexico

Patzún

- Fredrikstad, Norway

Quetzaltenango

- Campeche, Mexico
- Chiapa de Corzo, Mexico
- Livermore, United States
- San Cristóbal de Las Casas, Mexico
- Santa Fe, Spain
- Santa María Huatulco, Mexico
- Tapachula, Mexico
- Tromsø, Norway
- Turin, Italy
- Veracruz, Mexico

Salcajá

- Trenton, United States

San Juan Comalapa

- Göttingen (district), Germany

San Martín Sacatepéquez

- Fredrikstad, Norway

Tejutla

- Chiapa de Corzo, Mexico

Zacapa

- Tainan, Taiwan

Zaragoza

- Zaragoza, Spain

== Haiti ==
Aquin

- Delray Beach, United States

Arcahaie

- North Miami, United States

Borgne

- Honeoye Falls, United States

Cap-Haïtien

- Columbia, United States
- Fort Lauderdale, United States
- New Orleans, United States
- Portland, United States

Carrefour

- Granby, Canada

Les Cayes

- Boynton Beach, United States
- Cambridge, United States

La Chapelle

- North Miami Beach, United States

Croix-des-Bouquets

- North Miami, United States

Delmas

- North Miami, United States

Gonaïves

- North Miami Beach, United States

Jacmel

- Gainesville, United States

Pétion-Ville

- Lauderhill, United States

Petit-Goâve

- Miami-Dade County, United States

Port-au-Prince

- Miami, United States
- Montevideo, Uruguay

Saint-Louis-du-Nord

- North Miami, United States

Tabarre

- North Miami Beach, United States
- La Plata, Argentina

== Honduras ==
La Ceiba

- Broken Arrow, United States

Copán Ruinas

- Cusco, Peru

Patuca

- L'Ametlla de Mar, Spain

San Pedro Sula

- Duisburg, Germany
- Medellín, Colombia
- North Miami Beach, United States
- Taichung, Taiwan
- Zapopan, Mexico

Santa Bárbara

- Freeport, United States

Tegucigalpa

- Belo Horizonte, Brazil
- Guadalajara, Mexico
- Madrid, Spain
- Mexico City, Mexico
- New Orleans, United States
- Santa Tecla, El Salvador
- Taipei, Taiwan

Trujillo

- Trujillo, Spain

Las Vegas

- Berkeley, United States

Yoro

- Zaragoza, Spain

== Jamaica ==
Clarendon

- Haringey, England, United Kingdom

Falmouth

- Lauderhill, United States

Kingston

- Birmingham, United States
- Coventry, England, United Kingdom
- Gibraltar, Gibraltar
- Groton, United States
- Guadalajara, Mexico
- Kalamazoo, United States
- Lewisham, England, United Kingdom
- Miami-Dade County, United States
- New London, United States
- Salvador, Brazil
- Shenzhen, China
- Windhoek, Namibia
- Yantai, China

Montego Bay

- Atlanta, United States
- Hangzhou, China

Morant Bay

- Hartford, United States
- Newark, United States

Ocho Rios

- Oakland, United States
- Ostróda, Poland
- Owen Sound, Canada

Portmore

- Lakeland, United States

Saint Ann

- Buffalo, United States

Saint Elizabeth

- Redditch, England, United Kingdom

Westmoreland

- Tottori Prefecture, Japan

== Panama ==
Colón

- Santos, Brazil

Panama City

- Barranquilla, Colombia
- Caracas, Venezuela
- Charleston, United States
- Fort Lauderdale, United States
- Guadalajara, Mexico
- Imabari, Japan
- Incheon, South Korea
- Kaohsiung, Taiwan
- Liverpool, England, United Kingdom
- Madrid, Spain
- Medellín, Colombia
- San Diego, United States
- San Salvador, El Salvador
- Taipei, Taiwan

Penonomé

- Selçuklu, Turkey

Santiago de Veraguas

- Baoding, China

== Puerto Rico ==
Caguas

- Belén, Costa Rica
- Santa Fe, Spain

Comerío

- Callao, Peru

Mayagüez

- Callao, Peru
- Quiroga, Mexico

Ponce

- Zaragoza, Spain

Quebradillas

- Callao, Peru

San Germán

- Callao, Peru

San Juan

- Cádiz, Spain
- Cartagena, Colombia
- Dubai, United Arab Emirates
- Guatemala City, Guatemala
- Jacksonville, United States
- Killeen, United States
- Madrid, Spain
- San Juan, Philippines
- Santiago, Dominican Republic

Yauco

- Tequila, Mexico

== Saint Kitts and Nevis ==
Basseterre

- Kaohsiung, Taiwan

== Saint Lucia ==
Castries

- Taipei, Taiwan

== Saint Vincent and the Grenadines ==
Kingstown

- Taipei, Taiwan

== Sint Maarten ==
Sint Maarten

- Tallahassee, United States

== Trinidad and Tobago ==
Arima

- Haringey, England, United Kingdom

Chaguanas

- Lauderhill, United States

Port of Spain

- Atlanta, United States
- Georgetown, Guyana
- Lagos, Nigeria
- Morne-à-l'Eau, Guadeloupe, France
- Richmond, United States
- St. Catharines, Canada

San Fernando

- La Trinité, Martinique, France
