= List of twin towns and sister cities in Bosnia and Herzegovina =

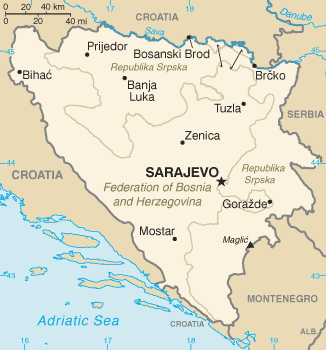
Map of Bosnia and Herzegovina

This is a list of municipalities in Bosnia and Herzegovina which have standing links to local communities in other countries known as "town twinning" (usually in Europe) or "sister cities" (usually in the rest of the world).

== B ==
Banja Luka

- Bari, Italy
- Belgrade, Serbia
- Bitonto, Italy
- Campobasso, Italy
- Kaiserslautern, Germany
- Kranj, Slovenia
- Kumanovo, North Macedonia
- Lviv, Ukraine
- Modi'in-Maccabim-Re'ut, Israel
- New Belgrade (Belgrade), Serbia
- North Mitrovica, Kosovo
- Patras, Greece
- Sremska Mitrovica, Serbia
- Zemun (Belgrade), Serbia

Banovići

- Bečej, Serbia
- Labin, Croatia

Bihać

- Bondeno, Italy
- Kikinda, Serbia
- Kuşadası, Turkey
- Nagykanizsa, Hungary
- Novo Mesto, Slovenia
- Reșița, Romania
- Villefranche-de-Rouergue, France

Bijeljina

- Azov, Russia
- Brașov, Romania
- Budva, Montenegro
- Goraždevac (Peja), Kosovo
- Kosjerić, Serbia
- Kruševac, Serbia
- Kumanovo, North Macedonia
- Langenhagen, Germany
- Leskovac, Serbia
- Ruse, Bulgaria
- Zrenjanin, Serbia

Brčko

- Samsun, Turkey
- Smederevska Palanka, Serbia
- St. Louis, United States

== C ==
Čapljina

- Koprivnica, Croatia
- Požega, Croatia
- Vrhnika, Slovenia

Cazin

- Develi, Turkey
- Kahramanmaraş, Turkey

Čitluk

- Fossò, Italy
- Križevci, Croatia
- Poggio San Marcello, Italy

== D ==
Derventa

- Pinerolo, Italy

Doboj

- Celje, Slovenia
- Ćuprija, Serbia

== G ==
Goražde

- Delčevo, North Macedonia
- Gaziemir, Turkey
- Gera, Germany
- Güngören, Turkey
- Karatay, Turkey
- Keçiören, Turkey
- Maragheh, Iran
- Şahinbey, Turkey
- Stari Grad (Sarajevo), Bosnia and Herzegovina

Gornji Vakuf-Uskoplje

- Neuhofen an der Krems, Austria
- Paks, Hungary
- Sancaktepe, Turkey
- Turgutlu, Turkey

Gračanica

- Fleury-les-Aubrais, France
- Formia, Italy
- Pljevlja, Montenegro

Gradačac

- Düren, Germany
- Sivas, Turkey
- Stryi, Ukraine

Gradiška

- Ćuprija, Serbia
- Kavala, Greece
- Montesilvano, Italy
- Negotino, North Macedonia
- Palilula (Belgrade), Serbia
- Zubin Potok, Kosovo

== H ==
Hadžići

- Hacılar, Turkey
- Meram, Turkey
- Reus, Spain

== I ==
Ilidža

- Çekmeköy, Turkey
- İzmit, Turkey

Istočno Sarajevo

- Krasnodar, Russia
- Niš, Serbia
- Novi Sad, Serbia

Istočno Sarajevo – Istočna Ilidža

- Crveni Krst (Niš), Serbia
- Pantelej (Niš), Serbia
- Shuya, Russia

Istočno Sarajevo – Istočno Novo Sarajevo

- Blace, Serbia
- Čukarica (Belgrade), Serbia
- Krupanj, Serbia
- Nikšić, Montenegro
- Ub, Serbia

Istočno Sarajevo – Pale

- Mangalia, Romania
- Smederevo, Serbia

== J ==
Jablanica

- Başiskele, Turkey
- Gevgelija, North Macedonia
- Inđija, Serbia
- Paraćin, Serbia

Jajce

- Alaçatı (Çeşme), Turkey
- Hallsberg, Sweden
- Kutná Hora, Czech Republic
- Ottensheim, Austria
- Piacenza, Italy
- Szekszárd, Hungary
- Tomislavgrad, Bosnia and Herzegovina
- Virovitica, Croatia
- Zenica, Bosnia and Herzegovina

== K ==
Konjic

- Altınova, Turkey
- Karacabey, Turkey
- Tivat, Montenegro

Kupres

- Baška Voda, Croatia
- Gospić, Croatia
- Kaštela, Croatia
- Valpovo, Croatia

== L ==
Laktaši

- Budva, Montenegro
- Čajetina, Serbia
- Lehavim, Israel
- Seiersberg-Pirka, Austria
- Veria, Greece
- Zrenjanin, Serbia

Lukavac

- Ulcinj, Montenegro
- Velenje, Slovenia

== M ==
Maglaj

- Çubuk, Turkey

Mostar

- Amman, Jordan
- Antalya, Turkey
- Arsoli, Italy
- Bassano del Grappa, Italy
- İzmir, Turkey
- Kayseri, Turkey
- Montegrotto Terme, Italy
- Ohrid, North Macedonia
- Osijek, Croatia
- Split, Croatia
- Tutin, Serbia
- Vukovar, Croatia

== P ==
Prijedor

- Bovec, Slovenia
- Centro Storico – Piedicastello (Trento), Italy
- Demir Hisar, North Macedonia
- Kikinda, Serbia
- Irkutsk, Russia
- Manisa, Turkey
- Ningbo, China
- Øygarden, Norway
- Pančevo, Serbia
- Velenje, Slovenia

Prnjavor

- Boleslawiec, Poland
- Boskovice, Czech Republic
- Zhydachiv, Ukraine

== S ==
Sarajevo

- Ankara, Turkey
- Baku, Azerbaijan
- Barcelona, Spain
- Budapest, Hungary
- Bursa, Turkey
- Collegno, Italy
- Coventry, England, United Kingdom
- Dayton, United States
- Doha, Qatar
- Ferrara, Italy
- Friedrichshafen, Germany
- Innsbruck, Austria
- Istanbul, Turkey
- İzmir, Turkey
- Kuwait City, Kuwait
- Ljubljana, Slovenia
- Madrid, Spain
- Magdeburg, Germany
- Podgorica, Montenegro
- Prato, Italy
- Pula, Croatia
- Skopje, North Macedonia
- Tianjin, China
- Tirana, Albania
- Tlemcen, Algeria
- Tripoli, Libya
- Venice, Italy

Sarajevo – Novi Grad

- Beyoğlu, Turkey
- Tuzla, Turkey

Sarajevo – Novo Sarajevo

- Cetinje, Montenegro

Sarajevo – Stari Grad

- Alexeyevsky (Moscow), Russia
- Bosanska Krupa, Bosnia and Herzegovina
- Budva, Montenegro
- Castagneto Carducci, Italy
- District 12 (Tehran), Iran
- Fatih, Turkey
- Galateia, Cyprus
- Gostivar, North Macedonia
- Karamürsel, Turkey
- Karpoš (Skopje), North Macedonia
- Kepez, Turkey
- Kragujevac, Serbia
- Krujë, Albania
- Makarska, Croatia
- Mamak, Turkey
- Ohrid, North Macedonia
- Olovo, Bosnia and Herzegovina
- Osmangazi, Turkey
- Peja, Kosovo
- Selçuklu, Turkey
- Silivri, Turkey
- Ulcinj, Montenegro
- Ümraniye, Turkey

Široki Brijeg

- Vinkovci, Croatia

== T ==
Tešanj

- Selçuklu, Turkey

Tomislavgrad

- Biograd na Moru, Croatia
- Bjelovar, Croatia
- Đakovo, Croatia
- Jajce, Bosnia and Herzegovina
- Knin, Croatia
- Nin, Croatia
- Novska, Croatia
- Solin, Croatia

Travnik

- İzmit, Turkey
- Karpoš (Skopje), North Macedonia
- Kırıkkale, Turkey
- Leipzig, Germany
- Makarska, Croatia
- Pendik, Turkey
- Police nad Metují, Czech Republic
- Yalova, Turkey

Tuzla

- Beşiktaş, Turkey
- Bologna, Italy
- L'Hospitalet de Llobregat, Spain
- Linz, Austria
- Osijek, Croatia
- Pécs, Hungary
- Saint-Denis, France
- Tuzla, Turkey

== U ==
Ugljevik

- Beočin, Serbia

== V ==
Velika Kladuša

- Cetinje, Montenegro
- Krnjak, Croatia

Visoko

- Altındağ, Turkey
- Bjelovar, Croatia
- Kartal, Turkey

Vogošća

- Çekmeköy, Turkey
- İzmit, Turkey

== Z ==
Zavidovići

- Berane, Montenegro
- Bozüyük, Turkey
- Gemlik, Turkey
- Kakanj, Bosnia and Herzegovina
- Nilüfer, Turkey
- Roncadelle, Italy
- Wiltz, Luxembourg
- Yunusemre, Turkey

Zenica

- Fiorenzuola d'Arda, Italy
- Gelsenkirchen, Germany
- Hunedoara, Romania
- Jajce, Bosnia and Herzegovina
- Karşıyaka, Turkey
- Luleå, Sweden
- Üsküdar, Turkey
- Veles, North Macedonia
- Zalaegerszeg, Hungary
