= List of twin towns and sister cities in Norway =

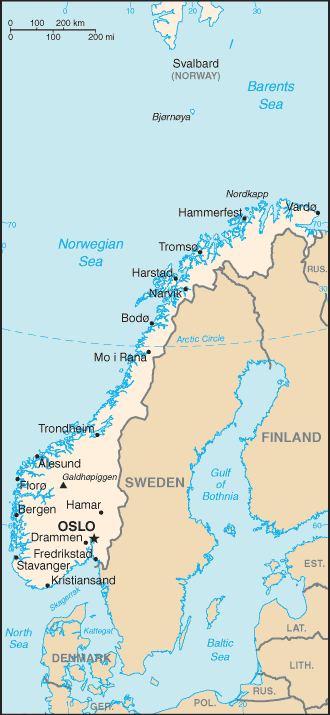
Map of Norway

This is a list of places in Norway which have standing links to local communities in other countries known as "town twinning" (usually in Europe) or "sister cities" (usually in the rest of the world).

== A ==
Ålesund

- Akureyri, Iceland
- Borgo a Mozzano, Italy
- Lahti, Finland
- Randers, Denmark
- Peterhead, Scotland, United Kingdom
- Tacoma, United States
- Västerås, Sweden

Alta

- Apatity, Russia
- Boden, Sweden
- Oulu, Finland

Aremark

- Vecpiebalga, Latvia

Arendal

- Árborg, Iceland
- Kalmar, Sweden
- Rēzekne, Latvia
- Savonlinna, Finland

Ås

- Ljungby, Sweden
- Paimio, Finland

Asker

- Eslöv, Sweden
- Garðabær, Iceland
- Jakobstad, Finland
- Rudersdal, Denmark

Askim

- Huddinge, Sweden
- Vantaa, Finland

Aurskog-Høland

- Frederikssund, Denmark
- Kumla, Sweden
- Sipoo, Finland

== B ==
Bærum

- Frederiksberg, Denmark
- Hafnarfjörður, Iceland
- Hämeenlinna, Finland
- Tartu, Estonia
- Uppsala, Sweden

Bamble

- Akranes, Iceland
- Närpes, Finland
- Tønder, Denmark
- Västervik, Sweden

Bergen

- Aarhus, Denmark
- Gothenburg, Sweden
- Newcastle upon Tyne, England, United Kingdom
- Rostock, Germany
- Seattle, United States
- Turku, Finland

Bodø

- Jönköping, Sweden
- Kuopio, Finland
- Svendborg, Denmark
- Vyborg, Russia

== D ==
Drammen

- Kolding, Denmark
- Lappeenranta, Finland
- Örebro, Sweden
- Stykkishólmur, Iceland

== E ==
Eidsberg

- Brønderslev, Denmark
- Nässjö, Sweden

Eidsvoll

- Fljótsdalshérað, Iceland
- Skara, Sweden
- Sorø, Denmark

== F ==
Flekkefjord

- Bollnäs, Sweden
- Burntisland, Scotland, United Kingdom
- Elbow Lake, United States
- Misburg-Anderten (Hanover), Germany

Fredrikstad

- Aalborg, Denmark
- Karlskoga, Sweden
- Kotka, Finland
- (Iceland) Norðurþing, Island
- Patzún, Guatemala
- Rivne, Ukraine
- San Martín Sacatepéquez, Guatemala
- Słupsk, Poland

Frogn

- Åmål, Sweden
- Golfo Aranci, Italy
- Kuldīga, Latvia
- Loimaa, Finland
- Mitte (Berlin), Germany
- Türi, Estonia

== G ==
Gjøvik

- Gävle, Sweden
- Næstved, Denmark
- Rauma, Finland
- Stoughton, United States

Gol

- Bracebridge, Canada

== H ==
Halden

- Ringsted, Denmark
- Sastamala, Finland
- Skövde, Sweden

Hamar

- Dalvíkurbyggð, Iceland
- Fargo, United States
- Greifswald, Germany
- Karmiel, Israel
- Khan Yunis, Palestine
- Lund, Sweden
- Porvoo, Finland
- Viborg, Denmark

Harstad

- Barnstaple, England, United Kingdom
- Helsingør, Denmark
- Umeå, Sweden
- Vaasa, Finland

Hemnes

- Prokuplje, Serbia
- Vännäs, Sweden

Holmestrand

- Arsuk, Greenland
- Countryside, Åland Islands, Finland
- Eiði, Faroe Islands
- Herning, Denmark
- Husby, Germany
- Kangasala, Finland
- Lazdijai, Lithuania
- Siglufjörður, Iceland
- Vänersborg, Sweden

== K ==
Karmøy

- Häädemeeste, Estonia
- Hankasalmi, Finland
- Mjölby, Sweden

Kongsberg

- Chitose, Japan
- Espoo, Finland
- Gouda, Netherlands
- Køge, Denmark
- Kristianstad, Sweden
- Skagafjörður, Iceland

Kristiansand

- Gdynia, Poland
- Kerava, Finland
- Letchworth, England, United Kingdom
- Münster, Germany
- Orléans, France
- Rajshahi, Bangladesh
- Trollhättan, Sweden
- Walvis Bay, Namibia

Kristiansund

- Fredericia, Denmark
- Härnösand, Sweden
- Kokkola, Finland

== L ==
Larvik

- Borlänge, Sweden
- Frederikshavn, Denmark

Lesja

- Marijampolė, Lithuania

Lier

- Falköping, Sweden
- Kokemäki, Finland
- Mariagerfjord, Denmark

Lillehammer

- Autrans-Méaudre-en-Vercors, France
- Hayward, United States
- Hørsholm, Denmark
- Leksand, Sweden
- Minamiuonuma, Japan
- Oberhof, Germany
- Oulainen, Finland

Lørenskog

- Garching bei München, Germany
- Järvenpää, Finland
- Rødovre, Denmark
- Täby, Sweden

== M ==
Mandal

- Korsholm, Finland
- Middelfart, Denmark
- Oskarshamn, Sweden

Melhus

- Taveta, Kenya

Modum

- Laukaa, Finland
- Östra Göinge, Sweden
- Stevns, Denmark

Molde

- Bardejov, Slovakia
- Bolesławiec, Poland
- Borås, Sweden
- Česká Lípa, Czech Republic
- Mikkeli, Finland
- Vejle, Denmark

Moss

- Aguacatán, Guatemala
- Blönduós, Iceland
- Karlstad, Sweden
- Horsens, Denmark
- Nokia, Finland
- Veliky Novgorod, Russia
- Virginia Beach, United States

== N ==
Narvik

- Kikinda, Serbia
- Kingisepp, Russia
- Kiruna, Sweden
- Nowy Sącz, Poland
- Rovaniemi, Finland

Nesodden

- Herlev, Denmark
- Höganäs, Sweden
- Lieto, Finland
- Santa Tecla, El Salvador
- Seltjarnarnes, Iceland

Nittedal

- Fredensborg, Denmark
- Håbo, Sweden
- Ingå, Finland

== O ==
Oppdal

- Jammerbugt, Denmark
- Lindesberg, Sweden

Oppegård

- Hvidovre, Denmark
- Sollentuna, Sweden
- Tuusula, Finland

== R ==
Rana

- Fairbanks, United States
- Raahe, Finland
- Skellefteå, Sweden
- Vesthimmerlands, Denmark

Ringerike

- Aabenraa, Denmark
- Lohja, Finland
- Skagaströnd, Iceland
- Växjö, Sweden

== S ==
Saltdal

- Niš, Serbia

Sande

- Akaa, Finland
- Klippan, Sweden
- Limbaži, Latvia

Sandefjord

- Haderslev, Denmark
- Uusikaupunki, Finland

Sandnes

- Labin, Croatia

Sarpsborg

- Bethlehem, Palestine
- Forssa, Finland
- Grand Forks, United States
- Södertälje, Sweden
- Struer, Denmark

Skaun

- Keuruu, Finland
- Langeland, Denmark
- Tingsryd, Sweden

Ski

- Gladsaxe, Denmark
- Pirkkala, Finland
- Solna, Sweden
- Viimsi, Estonia

Skien

- Belozersk, Russia
- Jõhvi, Estonia
- Loimaa, Finland
- Minot, United States
- Mosfellsbær, Iceland
- Onești, Romania
- Rendsburg, Germany
- Sorrento, Italy
- Thisted, Denmark
- Uddevalla, Sweden

Sortland

- Monchegorsk, Russia

Sør-Varanger

- Inari, Finland
- Pechengsky District, Russia
- Severomorsk, Russia

Stange

- Botkyrka, Sweden
- Brøndby, Denmark

Stavanger

- Aberdeen, Scotland, United Kingdom
- Antsirabe, Madagascar
- Esbjerg, Denmark
- Eskilstuna, Sweden
- Estelí, Nicaragua
- Fjarðabyggð, Iceland
- Galveston, United States
- Houston, United States
- Jyväskylä, Finland
- Nablus, Palestine
- Netanya, Israel

Stord

- Gentofte, Denmark
- Halmstad, Sweden
- Hanko, Finland

Svelvik

- Naantali, Finland
- Nordfyn, Denmark
- Vadstena, Sweden

== T ==
Tønsberg

- Ísafjarðarbær, Iceland
- Joensuu, Finland
- Linköping, Sweden

Tromsø

- Anchorage, United States
- Gaza City, Palestine
- Kemi, Finland
- Luleå, Sweden
- Quetzaltenango, Guatemala
- Zagreb, Croatia

Trondheim

- Darmstadt, Germany
- Dunfermline, Scotland, United Kingdom
- Graz, Austria
- Klaksvík, Faroe Islands
- Kópavogur, Iceland
- Norrköping, Sweden
- Odense, Denmark
- Petah Tikva, Israel
- Ramallah, Palestine
- Split, Croatia
- Tampere, Finland
- Tiraspol, Moldova
- Vallejo, United States

Trysil

- Kil, Sweden
- Laihia, Finland

== V ==
Vefsn

- Gornji Milanovac, Serbia
- Lycksele, Sweden

Vestby

- Vara, Sweden
