= List of twin towns and sister cities in Iraq =

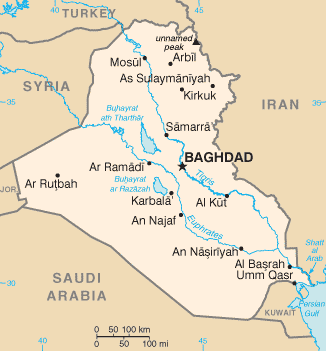
Map of Iraq

This is a list of municipalities in Iraq which have standing links to local communities in other countries. In most cases, the association, especially when formalised by local government, is known as "town twinning" (usually in Europe) or "sister cities" (usually in the rest of the world), and while most of the places included are towns, the list also includes villages, cities, districts, and counties with similar links.

== A ==
Ankawa

- Sterling Heights, United States

== B ==
Baghdad

- Cairo, Egypt
- Nishapur, Iran
- Pyongyang, North Korea
- Tehran, Iran

Basra

- Baku, Azerbaijan
- Houston, United States
- Nishapur, Iran

== D ==
Duhok

- Gainesville, United States

== K ==
Karbala

- Mashhad, Iran
- Nishapur, Iran
- Qom, Iran
- Tabriz, Iran

Kirkuk

- Konya, Turkey

== N ==
Najaf

- Minneapolis, United States
- Najafabad, Iran
- Mashhad, Iran

== Q ==
Al-Qa'im

- Laguna Niguel, United States

== R ==
Ranya

- Duluth, United States

== S ==
Sulaymaniyah

- Yiwu, China

== T ==
Tal Afar

- Meram, Turkey
