= List of twin towns and sister cities in Iran =

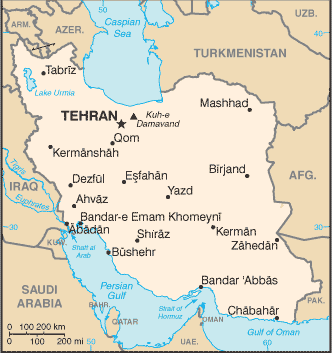
Map of Iran

This is a list of municipalities in Iran which have standing links to local communities in other countries known as "town twinning" (usually in Europe) or "sister cities" (usually in the rest of the world).

== A ==
Abadan

- Taormina, Italy

== B ==
Bostanabad

- Konya, Turkey

== D ==
Delijan

- Dilijan, Armenia

== G ==
Gorgan

- Aktau, Kazakhstan
- Samsun, Turkey

== H ==
Hamadan

- Bam, Iran
- Bukhara, Uzbekistan
- Isparta, Turkey
- Kulob, Tajikistan

== I ==
Isfahan

- Baalbek, Lebanon
- Dakar, Senegal
- Freiburg im Breisgau, Germany
- Havana, Cuba
- Iași, Romania
- Kazan, Russia
- Kuala Lumpur, Malaysia
- Lahore, Pakistan
- Porto, Portugal
- Samarkand, Uzbekistan
- Xi'an, China

== K ==
Kazerun

- Al-Mada'in, Iraq

Kermanshah

- Gaziantep, Turkey

Khoy

- Konya, Turkey

Kish Island

- Langkawi, Malaysia

== M ==
Maragheh

- Goražde, Bosnia and Herzegovina

Mashhad

- Karachi, Pakistan
- Karbala, Iraq
- Kuala Lumpur, Malaysia
- Lahore, Pakistan
- Matera, Italy
- Mazar-i-Sharif, Afghanistan
- Najaf, Iraq
- Santiago de Compostela, Spain
- Ürümqi, China

== N ==
Nishapur

- Baghdad, Iraq
- Balkh, Afghanistan
- Basra, Iraq
- Bukhara, Uzbekistan
- Ghazni, Afghanistan
- Herat, Afghanistan
- Kairouan, Tunisia
- Karbala, Iraq
- Khiva, Uzbekistan
- Khoy, Iran
- Khujand, Tajikistan
- Konya, Turkey
- Kulob, Tajikistan
- Merv, Turkmenistan
- Samarkand, Uzbekistan
- Shahin Shahr, Iran

== Q ==
Qazvin

- Bishkek, Kyrgyzstan

Qom

- Baalbek, Lebanon
- Karachi, Pakistan
- Karbala, Iraq
- Konya, Turkey
- Linxiang, China
- Santiago de Compostela, Spain

== R ==
Rasht

- Astrakhan, Russia
- Moscow, Russia
- Multan, Pakistan
- Trabzon, Turkey

== S ==
Sari

- Astrakhan, Russia

Shiraz

- Chongqing, China
- Dushanbe, Tajikistan
- Nanjing, China
- Nicosia, Cyprus
- Pécs, Hungary

== T ==
Tabriz

- Baku, Azerbaijan
- Erzurum, Turkey
- Ganja, Azerbaijan
- Gaza City, Palestine
- Istanbul, Turkey
- Karbala, Iraq
- Kazan, Russia
- Khujand, Tajikistan
- Mogilev, Belarus
- Shanghai, China

Tehran

- Ankara, Turkey
- Baghdad, Iraq
- Beijing, China
- Bishkek, Kyrgyzstan
- Brasília, Brazil
- Budapest, Hungary
- Caracas, Venezuela
- Dushanbe, Tajikistan
- East Jerusalem, Palestine
- Havana, Cuba
- Kabul, Afghanistan
- Khartoum, Sudan
- Minsk, Belarus
- Moscow, Russia
- Pretoria, South Africa
- Sanaa, Yemen
- (Georgia (country)) Tbilisi, Georgia

== U ==
Urmia

- Erzurum, Turkey
- Fujian, China
- Varna, Bulgaria

== Y ==
Yazd

- Gyumri, Armenia
- Homs, Syria
- Jászberény, Hungary
- (Georgia (country)) Poti, Georgia

== Z ==
Zanjan

- Trabzon, Turkey
