= List of twin towns and sister cities in Tunisia =

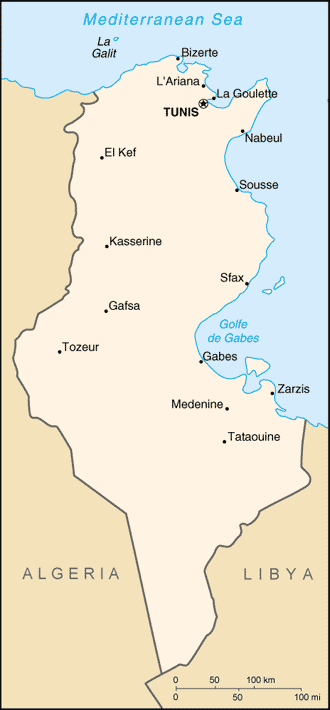
Map of Tunisia

This is a list of municipalities in Tunisia which have standing links to local communities in other countries known as "town twinning" (usually in Europe) or "sister cities" (usually in the rest of the world).

== A ==
Aryanah

- Gaziantep, Turkey
- Salé, Morocco

== B ==
Béja

- Beja, Portugal

Ben Arous

- Aprilia, Italy
- Saint-Étienne, France

Beni Hassen

- Schöningen, Germany

Bizerte

- Annaba, Algeria
- Kalamata, Greece
- Palermo, Italy
- Port Said, Egypt
- Tangier, Morocco

== C ==
Carthage

- Aix-en-Provence, France
- Tyre, Lebanon
- Versailles, France

== G ==
Gabès

- Trabzon, Turkey

Gafsa

- Naples, Italy
- Selçuklu, Turkey

La Goulette

- Kadıköy, Turkey

Gremda

- Villefontaine, France

== H ==
Hammam Sousse

- Boussu, Belgium
- Cheyenne, United States

Hammamet

- Aqaba, Jordan
- Nevers, France

Hammam-Lif

- Antony, France
- Granby, Canada
- Kenitra, Morocco
- Luxeuil-les-Bains, France
- Salsomaggiore Terme, Italy
- Zawiya, Libya

== J ==
Jendouba

- Keçiören, Turkey
- Wolfsburg, Germany

== K ==
Kairouan

- Bursa, Turkey
- Cairo, Egypt
- Córdoba, Spain
- Fez, Morocco
- Nishapur, Iran
- Samarkand, Uzbekistan
- Timbuktu, Mali

El Kef

- Bourg-en-Bresse, France
- Malatya, Turkey

Kelibia

- Almuñécar, Spain
- Marsala, Italy
- Pantelleria, Italy

Ksour Essef

- Plön, Germany

== M ==
Mahdia

- Alanya, Turkey
- Aveiro, Portugal
- Mazara del Vallo, Italy

Majaz al Bab

- Mora, Portugal

Manouba

- Meram, Turkey

Medenine

- Bédarieux, France

Menzel Bourguiba

- La Seyne-sur-Mer, France
- Stuttgart, Germany

Midoun

- Mauguio, France

Monastir

- Dushanbe, Tajikistan
- Manisa, Turkey
- Münster, Germany
- Saint-Étienne, France
- Tétouan, Morocco
- Tizi Ouzou, Algeria

M'saken

- Ronse, Belgium

== N ==
Nabeul

- El Jadida, Morocco
- Marbella, Spain
- Montélimar, France
- Seto, Japan

== O ==
Oueslatia

- Collegno, Italy

== S ==
Sfax

- Dakar, Senegal
- Grenoble, France
- Makhachkala, Russia
- Marburg, Germany
- Oran, Algeria
- Safi, Morocco

Siliana

- Kahramanmaraş, Turkey

Sousse

- Boulogne-Billancourt, France
- Braunschweig, Germany
- Constantine, Algeria
- İzmir, Turkey
- Ljubljana, Slovenia
- Marrakesh, Morocco
- Nice, France
- Thiès, Senegal
- Weihai, China

== T ==
Tabarka

- Fréjus, France

Tataouine

- Sakarya, Turkey

Tazerka

- Frameries, Belgium

Testour

- Mora, Portugal

Tozeur

- Beyoğlu, Turkey
- Geestland, Germany

Tunis

- Amman, Jordan
- Ankara, Turkey
- Barcelona, Spain
- Cologne, Germany
- Doha, Qatar
- Istanbul, Turkey
- Kuwait City, Kuwait
- Marseille, France
- Montreal, Canada
- Muscat, Oman
- Rabat, Morocco
- Rio de Janeiro, Brazil
