= List of twin towns and sister cities in Armenia =

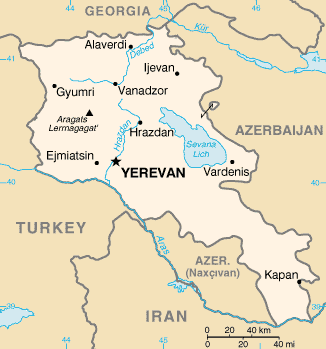
Map of Armenia

This is a list of places in Armenia which have standing links to local communities in other countries known as "town twinning" (usually in Europe) or "sister cities" (usually in the rest of the world).

== A ==
Abovyan

- Villeurbanne, France

Akhtala

- (Georgia (country)) Kobuleti, Georgia

Alaverdi

- Daugavpils, Latvia
- (Georgia (country)) Kobuleti, Georgia
- Polotsk, Belarus

Ararat

- Ungheni, Moldova

Armavir

- Allauch, France
- Armavir, Russia
- Feodosiya, Ukraine
- Naumburg, Germany
- Shakhty, Russia

Artashat

- Clamart, France
- Pestszentlőrinc-Pestszentimre (Budapest), Hungary

Artik

- Wodzisław Śląski, Poland

== D ==
Dilijan

- Delijan, Iran
- Pyatigorsk, Russia
- Roman, Romania

== G ==
Gavar

- Novorossiysk, Russia

Goris

- Vienne, France

Gyumri

- Ashfield, England, United Kingdom
- Białystok, Poland
- Córdoba, Argentina
- Créteil, France
- Domodedovo, Russia
- Glendale, United States
- Halle, Germany
- Mont-de-Marsan, France
- Mozdok, Russia
- Nardò, Italy
- Osasco, Brazil
- Pitești, Romania
- Plovdiv, Bulgaria
- Tver, Russia
- Vologda, Russia
- Xi'an, China
- Yazd, Iran

== I ==
Ijevan

- Kostroma, Russia
- Valence, France

== J ==
Jermuk

- Arkhangelsk, Russia
- Saint-Raphaël, France

== K ==
Kapan

- Glendale, United States

== O ==
Oshakan

- Alfortville, France

== S ==
Sevan

- Grenoble, France

Sisian

- Montélimar, France

Spitak

- Limmen (Castricum), Netherlands
- Orsha, Belarus
- Samara, Russia

Stepanavan

- Décines-Charpieu, France

== V ==
Vagharshapat

- Benalmádena, Spain
- Bethlehem, Palestine
- Daugavpils, Latvia
- Fresno, United States
- Issy-les-Moulineaux, France
- Martakert, Azerbaijan
- Petrozavodsk, Russia
- Sergiyev Posad, Russia

Vanadzor

- Bagneux, France
- (Georgia (country)) Batumi, Georgia
- Kislovodsk, Russia
- Lublin, Poland
- Maardu, Estonia
- Pasadena, United States
- Podolsk, Russia
- Shymkent, Kazakhstan
- (Georgia (country)) Tsqaltubo, Georgia
- Vitebsk, Belarus
- Zhuzhou, China

== Y ==
Yerevan

- Amman, Jordan
- Antananarivo, Madagascar
- Beirut, Lebanon
- Bratislava, Slovakia
- Buenos Aires, Argentina
- Cambridge, United States
- Carrara, Italy
- Chișinău, Moldova
- Damascus, Syria
- Leipzig, Germany
- Los Angeles, United States
- Montreal, Canada
- Nice, France
- Novosibirsk, Russia
- Odesa, Ukraine
- Riga, Latvia
- Rostov-on-Don, Russia
- São Paulo, Brazil
- Stavropol, Russia
- (Georgia (country)) Tbilisi, Georgia
- Venice, Italy
- Volgograd, Russia

Yerevan – Davtashen

- Antony, France
