= List of twin towns and sister cities in Vietnam =

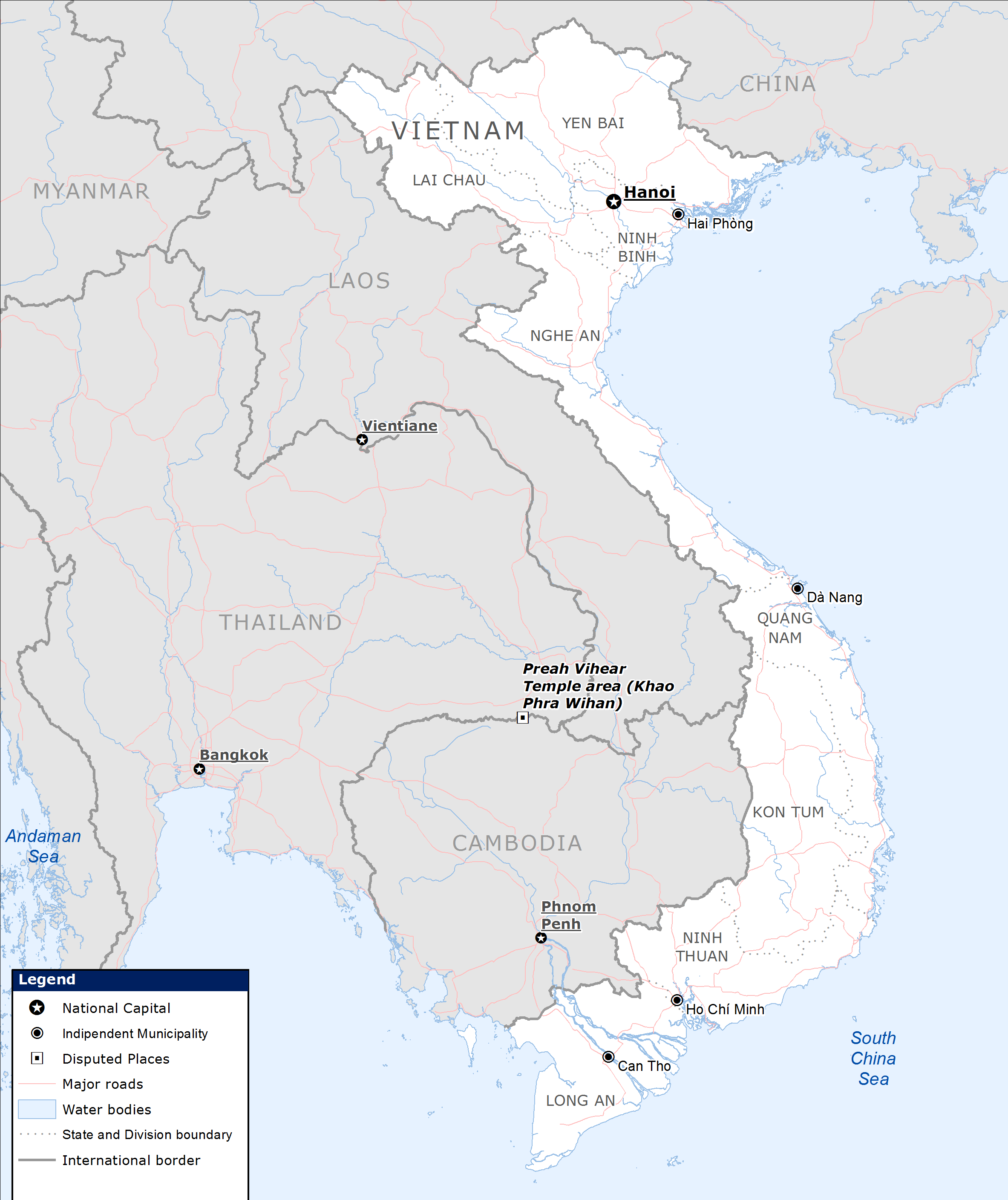
Map of Vietnam

This is a list of places in Vietnam which have standing links to local communities in other countries known as "town twinning" (usually in Europe) or "sister cities" (usually in the rest of the world).

== B ==
Bà Rịa–Vũng Tàu

- Padang, Indonesia

Bắc Ninh

- Cheb, Czech Republic

Biên Hòa

- Gimhae, South Korea

Bình Dương

- Daejeon, South Korea

== C ==
Cần Thơ

- Kaposvár, Hungary
- Riverside, United States
- Shantou, China

== D ==
Da Nang

- Battambang, Cambodia
- Champasak, Laos
- Changwon, South Korea
- Daegu, South Korea
- Haiphong, Vietnam
- Le Havre, France
- Kunming, China
- Mukdahan, Thailand
- Oakland, United States
- Pittsburgh, United States
- Savannakhet, Laos
- Tangier, Morocco
- Timișoara, Romania

Đồng Tháp

- Cheorwon, South Korea

== H ==
Hạ Long

- Fuzhou, China
- Guilin, China

Hải Dương

- Suwon, South Korea

Haiphong

- Da Nang, Vietnam
- Incheon, South Korea
- Kitakyushu, Japan
- Livorno, Italy
- Nanning, China
- Saint Petersburg, Russia
- Seattle, United States
- Tianjin, China

Hanoi

- Ankara, Turkey
- Astana, Kazakhstan
- Bangkok, Thailand
- Beijing, China
- Fukuoka Prefecture, Japan
- Ho Chi Minh City, Vietnam
- Huế, Vietnam
- Jakarta, Indonesia
- Minsk, Belarus
- Moscow, Russia
- Palermo, Italy
- Phnom Penh, Cambodia
- Pretoria, South Africa
- Seoul, South Korea
- Victoria, Seychelles
- Warsaw, Poland

Ho Chi Minh City

- Ahmadi, Kuwait
- Almaty, Kazakhstan
- Auvergne-Rhône-Alpes, France
- Bangkok, Thailand
- Champasak, Laos
- Busan, South Korea
- Guangdong Province, China
- Guangxi Zhuang Autonomous Region, China
- Hanoi, Vietnam
- Huế, Vietnam
- Leipzig, Germany
- Liverpool, England, United Kingdom
- Lyon, France
- Manila, Philippines
- Minsk, Belarus
- Moscow, Russia
- New York City, United States
- Osaka Prefecture, Japan
- Phnom Penh, Cambodia
- Saint Petersburg, Russia
- San Francisco, United States
- Shandong Province, China
- Shanghai, China
- Sofia, Bulgaria
- Vientiane, Laos
- Vladivostok, Russia
- Yangon, Myanmar
- Zhejiang Province, China

Hội An

- Kiama, Australia
- Szentendre, Hungary
- Wernigerode, Germany

Huế

- Gyeongju, South Korea
- Hanoi, Vietnam
- Ho Chi Minh City, Vietnam
- Honolulu, United States
- Namur, Belgium
- New Haven, United States
- São Luís, Brazil
- Yogyakarta, Indonesia

== K ==
Khánh Hòa

- Ulsan, South Korea

== M ==
Mỹ Tho

- Changwon, South Korea

== N ==
Nam Định

- Prato, Italy

Nghệ An

- Gwangju, South Korea

== Q ==
Quảng Nam

- Osan, South Korea

Quảng Trị

- Angel Fire, United States

== T ==
Thái Bình

- Pazardzhik, Bulgaria

== V ==
Vinh

- Namyangju, South Korea

Vĩnh Yên

- Liuzhou, China
