= List of twin towns and sister cities in Moldova =

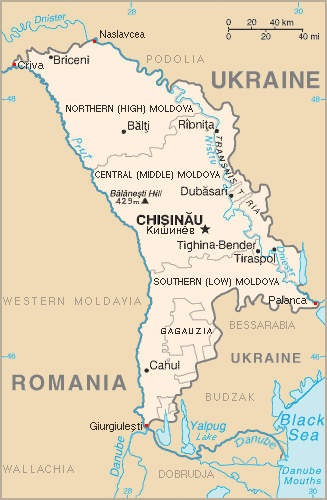
Map of Moldova

This is a list of localities in Moldova which have standing links to local communities in other countries known as "town twinning" (usually in Europe) or "sister cities" (usually in the rest of the world).

== A ==
Anenii Noi

- Korosten, Ukraine

== B ==
Bălți

- Arad, Israel
- Białystok, Poland
- Chernivtsi, Ukraine
- Comrat, Moldova
- İzmir, Turkey
- Khmelnytskyi, Ukraine
- Lakeland, United States
- Larissa, Greece
- Livny, Russia
- Miercurea Ciuc, Romania
- Mohyliv-Podilskyi, Ukraine
- Narva, Estonia
- Nizhny Novgorod, Russia
- Orsha, Belarus
- Płock, Poland
- Podolsk, Russia
- Polotsk, Belarus
- Pushkin, Russia
- Rechytsa, Belarus
- Stryi, Ukraine
- Vitebsk, Belarus
- Western AO (Moscow), Russia
- Wuzhong, China
- Zapadnoye Degunino (Moscow), Russia

Basarabeasca

- Smalyavichy, Belarus

Briceni

- Rădăuți, Romania
- Saldus, Latvia

== C ==
Cahul

- Constanța, Romania
- Vaslui, Romania

Călărași

- Călărași, Romania
- Covasna, Romania
- Dve Mogili, Bulgaria
- Raslavice, Slovakia

Căușeni

- Chortkiv, Ukraine
- Târgoviște, Romania
- Uman, Ukraine

Cazaclia

- Keçiören, Turkey
- Sapanca, Turkey

Ceadîr-Lunga

- Bursa, Turkey
- İzmit, Turkey
- Salihorsk, Belarus

Chișinău

- Alba Iulia, Romania
- Ankara, Turkey
- Borlänge, Sweden
- Bucharest, Romania
- Chernivtsi, Ukraine
- Grenoble, France
- Iași, Romania
- Kyiv, Ukraine
- Mannheim, Germany
- Minsk, Belarus
- Odesa, Ukraine
- Reggio Emilia, Italy
- Sacramento, United States
- Suceava, Romania
- (Georgia (country)) Tbilisi, Georgia
- Tel Aviv, Israel
- Yerevan, Armenia

Chișinău – Rîșcani

- Arad, Romania
- Năvodari, Romania
- Xihanggang Subdistrict (Chengdu), China

Cimișlia

- Nowogród Bobrzański, Poland

Comrat

- Babruysk, Belarus
- Bălți, Moldova
- Bolhrad, Ukraine
- Pendik, Turkey
- Salihorsk, Belarus
- Viru-Nigula, Estonia

Congaz

- Selçuklu, Turkey

Copceac

- Byala, Bulgaria
- Bykhaw, Belarus
- General Kantardzhievo (Aksakovo), Bulgaria
- Raslavice, Slovakia
- Şarköy, Turkey
- Strumica, North Macedonia
- Tokmok, Kyrgyzstan
- Valu lui Traian, Romania

Corjeuți

- Aloja (Limbaži), Latvia

Cricova

- Avanhard, Ukraine
- Bușteni, Romania
- Cotnari, Romania
- Noceto, Italy
- Târgu Ocna, Romania

Criuleni

- Jurbarkas, Lithuania
- Orăștie, Romania

Cupcini

- Khmilnyk, Ukraine

== D ==
Dondușeni

- Târgu Neamț, Romania

Drochia

- Dorohoi, Romania
- Kolomyia, Ukraine
- Rădăuți, Romania

Durlești

- Blaj, Romania
- Miroslava, Romania
- Prisăcani, Romania
- Tradate, Italy

== E ==
Edineț

- Kamianets-Podilskyi, Ukraine
- Onești, Romania
- Piatra Neamț, Romania
- Râmnicu Sărat, Romania
- Rēzekne Municipality, Latvia
- Roman, Romania
- Săcele, Romania

== F ==
Florești

- Gulbene, Latvia
- Maladzyechna, Belarus
- Saldus, Latvia
- Vatra Dornei, Romania

== G ==
Ghelăuza

- Tukums, Latvia

Ghidighici

- Florești, Romania

== H ==
Hîncești

- Or Akiva, Israel
- Ploiești, Romania
- Zhodzina, Belarus

== I ==
Ialoveni

- Force, Italy
- Ineu, Romania
- Lesznowola, Poland
- Montefortino, Italy
- Pașcani, Romania
- Pocheon, South Korea
- Radnevo, Bulgaria
- Senec, Slovakia
- Tomești, Romania
- Topraisar, Romania

== L ==
Leova

- Boldești-Scăeni, Romania
- Pavlikeni, Bulgaria

== M ==
Măgdăcești

- Mioveni, Romania

== N ==
Nisporeni

- Lugoj, Romania

== O ==
Ocnița

- Preiļi, Latvia

Orhei

- Bergama, Turkey
- Dolyna, Ukraine
- Piatra Neamț, Romania
- Talsi, Latvia

== P ==
Pașcani

- Pașcani, Romania

== R ==
Rîbnița

- Chernyakhovsk, Russia
- Dmitrov, Russia
- Dyatkovsky District, Russia
- Hola Prystan, Ukraine

Rîșcani

- Lida, Belarus

== S ==
Slobozia Mare

- Florești, Romania

Soroca

- Bauska, Latvia
- Bistrița, Romania
- Buzău, Romania
- Rēzekne, Latvia
- Suceava, Romania

Ștefan Vodă

- Bistrița, Romania
- Roman, Romania

Strășeni

- Buzău, Romania
- Onești, Romania
- Sebeș, Romania

== T ==
Taraclia

- Sliven, Bulgaria

Telenești

- Târgu Neamț, Romania

Tiraspol

- Kaluga, Russia
- Kursk, Russia
- Lyeninski (Minsk), Belarus
- Novosibirsk, Russia
- Santarém, Portugal
- (Georgia (country)) Sukhumi, Georgia
- Ternopil, Ukraine
- Trondheim, Norway
- (Georgia (country)) Tskhinvali, Georgia

== U ==
Ungheni

- Ararat, Armenia
- Bistrița, Romania
- Cascais, Portugal
- Cluj-Napoca, Romania
- Daliyat al-Karmel, Israel
- Dobele, Latvia
- Dorohoi, Romania
- Horishni Plavni, Ukraine
- Iași, Romania
- Joniškis, Lithuania
- Konin, Poland
- (Georgia (country)) Kutaisi, Georgia
- Ladyzhyn, Ukraine
- Mankato, United States
- Novoselytsia, Ukraine
- Reghin, Romania
- Sector 5 (Bucharest), Romania
- Winston-Salem, United States

== V ==
Vadul lui Vodă

- Jonava, Lithuania
- Pucioasa, Romania
- Saky, Ukraine
- Smila, Ukraine

Văsieni

- Pantelimon, Romania
