= List of twin towns and sister cities in Azerbaijan =

Map of Azerbaijan

This is a list of places in Azerbaijan which have standing links to local communities in other countries known as "town twinning" (usually in Europe) or "sister cities" (usually in the rest of the world).

== B ==
Baku

- Basra, Iraq
- Bordeaux, France
- Dakar, Senegal
- Houston, United States
- İzmir, Turkey
- Jeddah, Saudi Arabia
- Kyiv, Ukraine
- Ljubljana, Slovenia
- Moscow, Russia
- Naples, Italy
- Pretoria, South Africa
- Rio de Janeiro, Brazil
- Saint Petersburg, Russia
- Sarajevo, Bosnia and Herzegovina
- Tabriz, Iran
- (Georgia (country)) Tbilisi, Georgia

== G ==
Ganja

- Derbent, Russia
- Kars, Turkey
- (Georgia (country)) Kutaisi, Georgia
- Moscow, Russia
- Newark, United States
- Olomouc Region, Czech Republic
- Ordu, Turkey
- Tabriz, Iran

Gədəbəy

- Stillwater, United States

Goychay

- Lida, Belarus
- Valmontone, Italy

== I ==
Ismayilli

- Itō, Japan
- Kiryat Bialik, Israel
- Nyasvizh, Belarus

== L ==
Lachin

- Highland, United States

Lankaran

- Monterey, United States

== M ==
Martakert

- Vagarshapat, Armenia

Martuni

- Les Pennes-Mirabeau, France

Mingachevir

- Afula, Israel
- Gölbaşı, Turkey
- Kahramanmaraş, Turkey
- Kars, Turkey
- Orhangazi, Turkey
- Polotsk, Belarus

== N ==
Naftalan

- Yessentuki, Russia

Nakhchivan

- (Georgia (country)) Batumi, Georgia
- Brest, Belarus
- Ürümqi, China
- Veliko Tarnovo, Bulgaria

== Q ==
Qazax

- Bolu, Turkey
- Trakai, Lithuania

== S ==
Salyan

- Kahramanmaraş, Turkey

Shaki

- Bergama, Turkey
- Gabrovo, Bulgaria
- Giresun, Turkey
- Göynük, Turkey
- Lapseki, Turkey
- Meram, Turkey
- Slutsk, Belarus
- (Georgia (country)) Telavi, Georgia

Shamakhi

- Iğdır, Turkey
- Tirat Carmel, Israel

Sharur

- Iğdır, Turkey

Shusha

- Kayseri, Turkey
- Turkistan, Kazakhstan

Stepanakert

- Baia Mare, Romania
- Franco da Rocha, Brazil
- Mairiporã, Brazil
- Montebello, United States

Sumgait

- Aktau, Kazakhstan
- Białystok, Poland
- Ceyhan, Turkey
- Cherkasy, Ukraine
- Keçiören, Turkey
- Ludwigshafen am Rhein, Germany
- Mogilev, Belarus
- Nevinnomyssk, Russia
- Quzhou, China
- (Georgia (country)) Rustavi, Georgia

== T ==
Tovuz

- Cognac, France
