= List of twin towns and sister cities in Cuba =

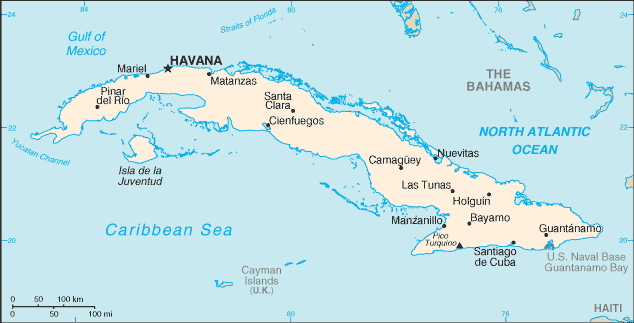
Map of Cuba

This is a list of municipalities in Cuba which have standing links to local communities in other countries. In most cases, the association, especially when formalised by local government, is known as "town twinning" (usually in Europe) or "sister cities" (usually in the rest of the world).

== B ==
Baracoa

- Roccarainola, Italy

Batabanó

- Santa Cruz de Juventino Rosas, Mexico

Bayamo

- Savona, Italy

== C ==
Caibarién

- Bloomington, United States
- Normal, United States

Caimito

- Barañain, Spain

Camagüey

- Madison, United States
- Mérida, Mexico
- Novelda, Spain

Cárdenas

- Paracho, Mexico

Cauto Cristo

- Rialto, Italy

Cienfuegos

- Bahía Blanca, Argentina
- Cuenca, Ecuador
- Etzatlán, Mexico
- Kingston, Canada
- Tacoma, United States

Colón

- Calkiní, Mexico

== G ==
Guantánamo

- Ixtapan de la Sal, Mexico

Guisa

- Ceriana, Italy

== H ==
Havana

- Ankara, Turkey
- Barcelona, Spain
- Beijing, China
- Belo Horizonte, Brazil
- Brasília, Brazil
- (Republic of the Congo) Brazzaville, Congo
- Cádiz, Spain
- Constanța, Romania
- Cusco, Peru
- Florianópolis, Brazil
- Gijón, Spain
- Glasgow, Scotland, United Kingdom
- Isfahan, Iran
- İzmir, Turkey
- Jundiaí, Brazil
- Kyiv, Ukraine
- León, Mexico
- Madrid, Spain
- Mexico City, Mexico
- Minsk, Belarus
- Mobile, United States
- Montevideo, Uruguay
- Oaxaca de Juárez, Mexico
- Oran, Algeria
- La Paz, Bolivia
- Rio de Janeiro, Brazil
- Rotterdam, Netherlands
- Saint Petersburg, Russia
- Salvador, Brazil
- Santos, Brazil
- São Bernardo do Campo, Brazil
- São Paulo, Brazil
- São Vicente, Brazil
- Seville, Spain
- Tehran, Iran
- Tijuana, Mexico
- Ulaanbaatar, Mongolia
- Valparaíso, Chile
- Veracruz, Mexico

Havana – Arroyo Naranjo

- Leganés, Spain

Havana – Boyeros

- Guarulhos, Brazil
- Reus, Spain
- Rubí, Spain
- Tepebaşı, Turkey

Havana – Cerro

- Mexico City, Mexico
- Nilüfer, Turkey

Havana – Cotorro

- Campinas, Brazil

Havana – Diez de Octubre

- Cuautitlán Izcalli, Mexico

Havana – Habana del Este

- Casarrubuelos, Spain
- Santa Coloma de Gramenet, Spain

Havana – La Lisa

- Albacete, Spain
- Ivry-sur-Seine, France

Havana – Marianao

- Irapuato, Mexico
- Sant Boi de Llobregat, Spain
- Santa Ana, Costa Rica
- Zapopan, Mexico

Havana – Old Havana

- Córdoba, Spain
- Guanajuato, Mexico
- Isla Mujeres, Mexico
- Morelia, Mexico
- San Miguel de Allende, Mexico
- Sintra, Portugal
- Toledo, Spain
- Torrelavega, Spain
- Viveiro, Spain

Havana – Playa

- Créteil, France
- Santa Fe, Spain

Havana – Plaza de la Revolución

- Alcalá de Henares, Spain
- Ourense, Spain

Havana – Regla

- Almada, Portugal
- Richmond, United States

Havana – San Miguel del Padrón

- Mieres, Spain

Holguín

- Saltillo, Mexico
- Santa Fe, United States
- São Vicente, Brazil

== J ==
Jaruco

- Tarquinia, Italy

Jovellanos

- Erongarícuaro, Mexico

== L ==
Limonar

- Tingambato, Mexico

== M ==
Madruga

- Berriozar, Spain

Mariel

- Cornellà de Llobregat, Spain

Martí

- Nahuatzen, Mexico

Matanzas

- Campeche, Mexico
- Morelia, Mexico
- Nizhny Novgorod, Russia
- Pittsburgh, United States
- Uruapan, Mexico
- Vilanova i la Geltrú, Spain

== N ==
Niquero

- Tuxpan, Mexico

Nuevitas

- Benalmádena, Spain

== P ==
Los Palacios

- Los Palacios y Villafranca, Spain

Palma Soriano

- Berkeley, United States

Pedro Betancourt

- Nuevo Parangaricutiro, Mexico
- Tancítaro, Mexico

Perico

- Peribán, Mexico
- Ziracuaretiro, Mexico

Pinar del Río

- Dos Hermanas, Spain

== R ==
Remedios

- Ann Arbor, United States
- Bloomington, United States
- Normal, United States

Río Cauto

- Arnasco, Italy

== S ==
San Antonio de los Baños

- Châlette-sur-Loing, France
- Mexico City, Mexico
- Zapotlanejo, Mexico

San José de las Lajas

- Badajoz, Spain
- Coslada, Spain

Sancti Spíritus

- Novellara, Italy
- La Orotava, Spain

Santa Clara

- Cheboksary, Russia
- Bloomington, United States
- Oviedo, Spain
- Rosario, Argentina

Santa Cruz del Norte

- Santa Cruz de Tenerife, Spain

Santiago de Cuba

- Le Lamentin, Martinique, France
- Naples, Italy
- Oakland, United States
- Palermo, Italy
- Paraná, Argentina
- Rosario, Argentina
- Saint Petersburg, Russia
- San Bartolomé de Tirajana, Spain
- Santiago, Mexico

== T ==
Taguasco

- La Victoria de Acentejo, Spain

Trinidad

- Brunswick, United States
- San Benedetto del Tronto, Italy

== U ==
Unión de Reyes

- Taretan, Mexico

== Y ==
Yateras

- Boulder, United States
