= List of twin towns and sister cities in Taiwan =

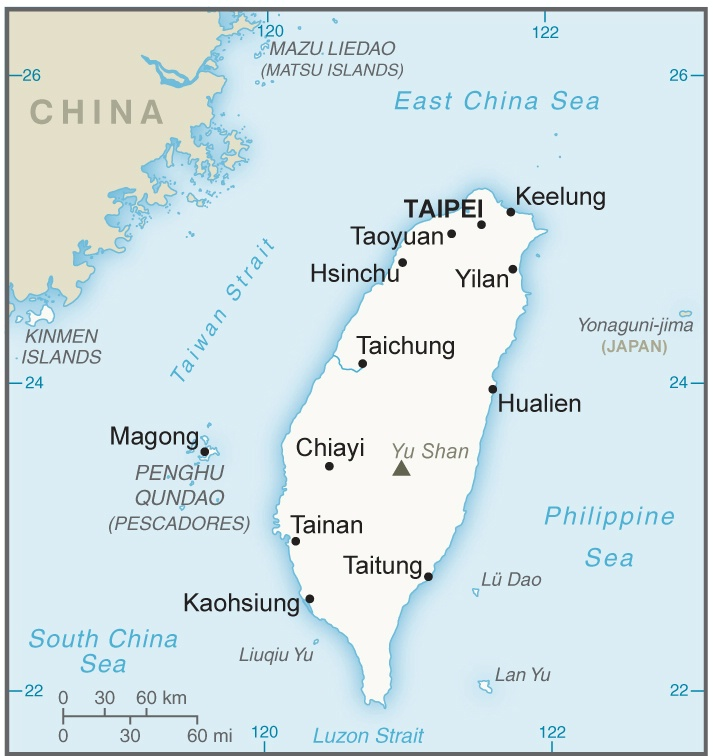
Map of Taiwan

This is a list of places in Taiwan which have standing links to local communities in other countries. In most cases, the association, especially when formalised by local government, is known as "town twinning" (usually in Europe) or "sister cities" (usually in the rest of the world).

== C ==
Changhua

- Muncie, United States
- San Gabriel, United States

Chiayi

- Bulacan, Philippines
- East Orange, United States
- Hsinchu, Taiwan
- Jackson, United States
- Juneau, United States
- Martinsburg, United States
- Miaoli, Taiwan
- Murray, United States
- Syracuse, United States

== H ==
Hsinchu

- Airai, Palau
- Beaverton, United States
- Cary, United States
- Chiayi, Taiwan
- Cupertino, United States
- Fairfield, Australia
- Okayama, Japan
- Plano, United States
- Puerto Princesa, Philippines
- Richland, United States

Hsinchu County

- Santa Clara County, United States
- Westmont, United States

Hualien

- Albuquerque, United States
- Bellevue, United States
- Hawaii County, United States
- Jecheon, South Korea
- Oudtshoorn, South Africa
- Takachiho, Japan
- Ulsan, South Korea
- Yonaguni, Japan

== K ==
Kaohsiung

- Barranquilla, Colombia
- Basseterre, Saint Kitts and Nevis
- Belize City, Belize
- Blantyre, Malawi
- Brisbane, Australia
- Busan, South Korea
- Cartago, Costa Rica
- Cebu City, Philippines
- Colorado Springs, United States
- Da Nang, Vietnam
- Durban, South Africa
- Fort Lauderdale, United States
- Hachiōji, Japan
- Honolulu, United States
- Katowice, Poland
- Knoxville, United States
- Koror, Palau
- Little Rock, United States
- Macon, United States
- Mbabane, Eswatini
- Miami, United States
- Orange County, United States
- Panama City, Panama
- Pensacola, United States
- Pima County, United States
- Plains, United States
- Portland, United States
- Pristina, Kosovo
- San Antonio, United States
- San-Pédro, Ivory Coast
- Seattle, United States
- Surabaya, Indonesia
- Tucson, United States
- Tulsa, United States

Keelung

- Corpus Christi, United States
- Kure, Japan
- Marrickville (Inner West), Australia
- Rosemead, United States
- Salt Lake City, United States
- Sangju, South Korea
- Yakima, United States
- Yatsushiro, Japan

== M ==
Miaoli

- Bartlett, United States
- Chiayi, Taiwan

== N ==
Nantou

- Ipswich, Australia
- West Valley City, United States
- Yeongju, South Korea

Nantou – Puli

- Izumi, Japan

New Taipei

- Baltimore County, United States
- Cincinnati, United States
- Harris County, United States
- Jaluit Atoll, Marshall Islands
- Los Angeles County, United States
- Loudoun County, United States
- Miami-Dade County, United States
- Richland County, United States
- Rizal, Philippines
- Starnberg (district), Germany

New Taipei – Sanxia

- Diamond Bar, United States

New Taipei – Tamsui

- San Marino, United States

New Taipei – Xindian

- Tavares, United States

New Taipei – Xizhi

- Doral, United States

New Taipei – Yonghe

- Monterey Park, United States

== P ==
Penghu

- Kauai County, United States

Pingtung

- Maui County, United States

Pingtung – Hengchun

- Sunny Isles Beach, United States

== T ==
Taichung

- Auckland, New Zealand
- Austin, United States
- Baton Rouge, United States
- Cheyenne, United States
- Chungju, South Korea
- Columbia, United States
- Columbus, United States
- Contra Costa County, United States
- Guam, United States
- Kwajalein Atoll, Marshall Islands
- Makati, Philippines
- Manchester, United States
- Melekeok, Palau
- Mexicali, Mexico
- Miyazaki Prefecture, Japan
- Montgomery County, United States
- Msunduzi, South Africa
- Nassau County, United States
- New Haven, United States
- Petah Tikva, Israel
- Reno, United States
- San Diego, United States
- San Pedro Sula, Honduras
- Santa Cruz de la Sierra, Bolivia
- Sumter County, United States
- Tacoma, United States
- Tucson, United States
- Uvs, Mongolia
- Winnipeg, Canada

Taichung – Wuqi

- Newton, United States

Tainan

- Béziers, France
- Cagayan de Oro, Philippines
- Carbondale, United States
- Cavite City, Philippines
- Columbus, United States
- Elbląg, Poland
- Fairbanks, United States
- Gold Coast, Australia
- Gwangju, South Korea
- Huntsville, United States
- Kansas City, United States
- Kinmen, Taiwan
- Laredo, United States
- Łódź, Poland
- Monterey, United States
- Nelson Mandela Bay, South Africa
- New Orleans, United States
- Oklahoma City, United States
- Orlando, United States
- Pasay, Philippines
- Ra'anana, Israel
- San Jose, United States
- Santa Cruz de la Sierra, Bolivia
- Snohomish County, United States
- Tagaytay, Philippines
- Trece Martires, Philippines
- Wotje Atoll, Marshall Islands
- Zacapa, Guatemala

Taipei

- Asunción, Paraguay
- Atlanta, United States
- (The Gambia) Banjul, Gambia
- Belmopan, Belize
- Bissau, Guinea-Bissau
- Boston, United States
- Castries, Saint Lucia
- Cleveland, United States
- Cotonou, Benin
- Daegu, South Korea
- Dakar, Senegal
- Dallas, United States
- Gold Coast, Australia
- Guam, United States
- Guatemala City, Guatemala
- Houston, United States
- Indianapolis, United States
- Jeddah, Saudi Arabia
- Johannesburg, South Africa
- Kingstown, Saint Vincent and the Grenadines
- Lilongwe, Malawi
- Lima, Peru
- Lomé, Togo
- Los Angeles, United States
- Majuro, Marshall Islands
- Managua, Nicaragua
- Manila, Philippines
- Marshall, United States
- Mbabane, Eswatini
- Monrovia, Liberia
- Oklahoma City, United States
- Ouagadougou, Burkina Faso
- Panama City, Panama
- La Paz, Bolivia
- Phoenix, United States
- Prague, Czech Republic
- Pretoria, South Africa
- Quezon City, Philippines
- Quito, Ecuador
- Riga, Latvia
- San Francisco, United States
- San José, Costa Rica
- San Nicolás de los Garza, Mexico
- San Salvador, El Salvador
- Santo Domingo, Dominican Republic
- Seoul, South Korea
- Tegucigalpa, Honduras
- Ulaanbaatar, Mongolia
- Ulan-Ude, Russia
- Versailles, France
- Vilnius, Lithuania
- Warsaw, Poland

Taipei – Shilin

- Los Altos, United States

Taitung

- Debrecen, Hungary
- Sokcho, South Korea
- Storm Lake, United States

Taoyuan

- Angeles City, Philippines
- Alameda County, United States
- Aur Atoll, Marshall Islands
- Dallas County, United States
- DeSoto, United States
- Fulton County, United States
- Garland, United States
- Hartford County, United States
- Irvine, United States
- Kaga, Japan
- Kennewick, United States
- Logan, Australia
- Long Beach, United States
- Narita, Japan
- Orange Walk Town, Belize
- Radom, Poland
- Ramat Gan, Israel
- San Bernardino County, United States
- Singkawang, Indonesia
- Tsukubamirai, Japan

Taoyuan – Guishan

- Grand Prairie, United States

Taoyuan – Zhongli

- Enfield, United States
- Gumi, South Korea

== Y ==
Yilan

- Leawood, United States
- Madera, United States
- Rockville, United States

Yunlin – Beigang

- Marysville, United States
