= List of sister cities in Thailand =

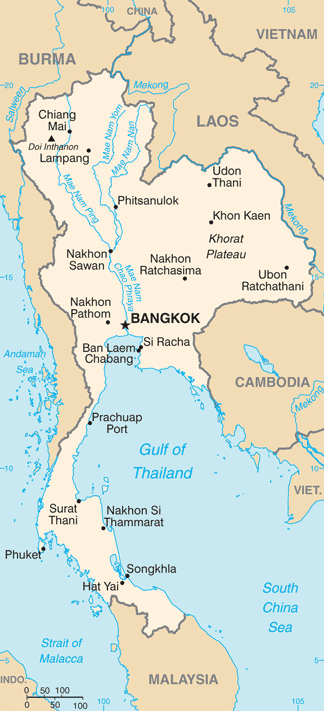
Map of Thailand

This is a list of places in Thailand which have standing links to local communities in other countries. In most cases, the association, especially when formalised by local government, is known as "town twinning" (usually in Europe) or "sister cities" (usually in the rest of the world).

== B ==
Bangkok

- Aichi Prefecture, Japan
- Ankara, Turkey
- Astana, Kazakhstan
- Beijing, China
- Chaozhou, China
- Chongqing, China
- Fukuoka Prefecture, Japan
- Guangzhou, China
- Hanoi, Vietnam
- Ho Chi Minh City, Vietnam
- Istanbul, Turkey
- Jakarta, Indonesia
- Lausanne, Switzerland
- Manila, Philippines
- Moscow, Russia
- Penang Island, Malaysia
- Phnom Penh, Cambodia
- Saint Petersburg, Russia
- Seoul, South Korea
- Shandong, China
- Shanghai, China
- Ulaanbaatar, Mongolia
- Washington, D.C., United States
- Wuhan, China

== C ==
Chiang Rai

- Union City, United States

== U ==
Udon Thani

- Reno, United States
