= List of twin towns and sister cities in Malaysia =

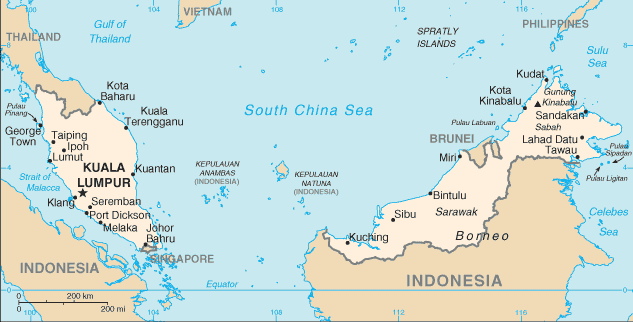
Map of Malaysia

This is a list of local governments in Malaysia which have standing links to local communities in other countries. In most cases, the association, especially when formalised by local government, is known as "town twinning" (usually in Europe) or "sister cities" (usually in the rest of the world).

== B ==
Beaufort

- Beaufort, United States

== I ==
Ipoh

- Fukuoka, Japan

== J ==
Johor Bahru

- Changzhou, China
- Istanbul, Turkey
- Kuching, Malaysia

== K ==
Klang

- Ürümqi, China
- Yongzhou, China

Kota Bharu

- Kasaoka, Japan

Kota Kinabalu

- Hangzhou, China
- Heyuan, China
- Jiangmen, China
- Ratchaburi, Thailand
- Vladivostok, Russia
- Yeosu, South Korea
- Yongin, South Korea

Kuala Lumpur

- Ankara, Turkey
- Casablanca, Morocco
- Chennai, India
- Dubai, United Arab Emirates
- Isfahan, Iran
- Karachi, Pakistan
- London, England, United Kingdom
- Malacca City, Malaysia
- Mashhad, Iran

Kuala Terengganu

- Makassar, Indonesia

Kuantan

- Qinzhou, China

Kuching

- Jeddah, Saudi Arabia
- Johor Bahru, Malaysia
- Kunming, China
- Pontianak, Indonesia
- Quanzhou, China

== L ==
Labuan

- Xianning, China

Langkawi

- Kish Island, Iran

== M ==
Malacca City

- Haikou, China
- Hoorn, Netherlands
- Kota Tua (Jakarta), Indonesia
- Kuala Lumpur, Malaysia
- Nanjing, China
- Lisbon, Portugal
- Siak, Indonesia
- Valparaíso, Chile

Miri

- Guangning, China
- Hualien County, Taiwan

== P ==
Padawan – Uma Bawang

- Berkeley, United States

Penang Island

- Adelaide, Australia
- Bangkok, Thailand
- Medan, Indonesia
- Phuket, Thailand
- Xiamen, China

Petaling Jaya

- Asan, South Korea
- Bandung, Indonesia
- Miyoshi, Japan

Putrajaya

- Astana, Kazakhstan

== S ==
Sandakan

- Burwood, Australia
- Zamboanga City, Philippines

Seberang Perai

- Fremantle, Australia

Seremban

- Bukittinggi, Indonesia

Shah Alam

- Hanam, South Korea
- Surabaya, Indonesia

Sibu

- Fuqing, China
- Guangning, China
- Gulou (Fuzhou), China
- Gutian, China
- Jintang, China
- Minqing, China
- Nanping, China
- Ningde, China
- Pingnan, China
- Putian, China
- Puyang, China
- Qinghe, China
- Wuyishan, China

== T ==
Tawau

- Zhangping, China
