= List of twin towns and sister cities in Estonia =

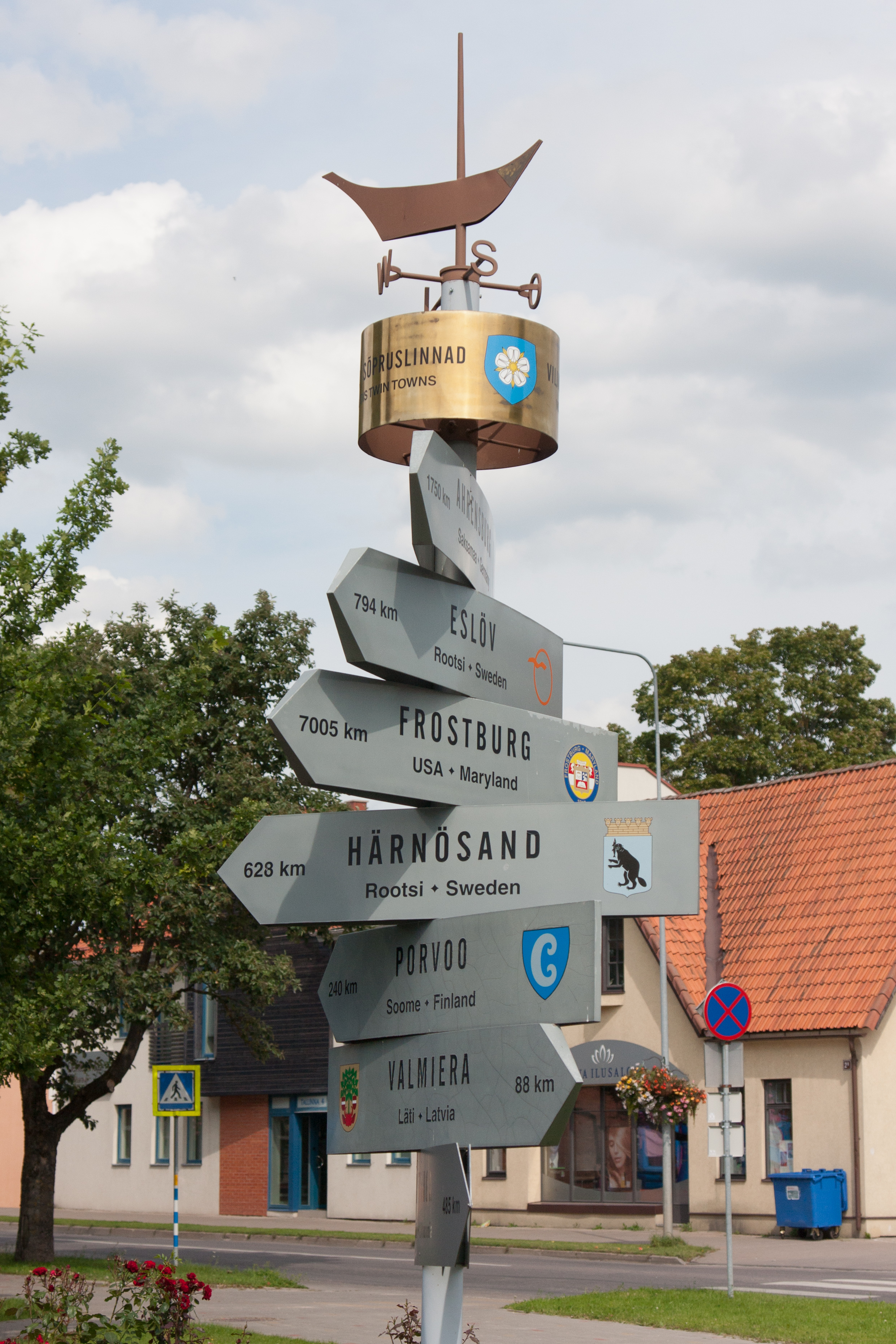
Twin towns of Viljandi

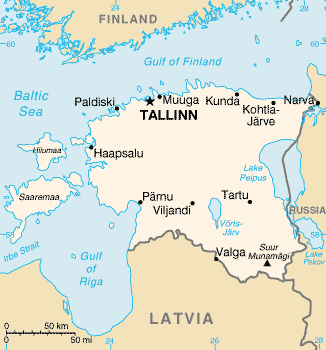
Map of Estonia

This is a list of places in Estonia which have standing links to local communities in other countries known as "town twinning" (usually in Europe) or "sister cities" (usually in the rest of the world).

== A ==
Anija

- Salo, Finland

Antsla

- Uusikaupunki, Finland

== E ==
Elva

- Salo, Finland

== H ==
Häädemeeste

- Hankasalmi, Finland
- Karmøy, Norway
- Mjölby, Sweden
- Salacgrīva (Limbaži), Latvia

Haapsalu

- Eskilstuna, Sweden
- Fundão, Portugal
- Haninge, Sweden
- Hanko, Finland
- Ogre, Latvia
- Rendsburg, Germany
- Uman, Ukraine

Haljala

- Laboe, Germany
- Pyhtää, Finland
- Schönberg, Germany

Harku

- Eura, Finland
- Piaseczno, Poland

Hiiumaa

- Neukloster-Warin, Germany
- Norrtälje, Sweden
- Pargas, Finland
- Virolahti, Finland

== J ==
Järva

- Kokkola, Finland

Jõgeva

- Jonava, Lithuania
- Kaarina, Finland
- Karlstad, Sweden
- Kaišiadorys, Lithuania
- Keuruu, Finland
- Makariv Raion, Ukraine
- Valozhyn District, Belarus

Jõhvi

- Kingisepp, Russia
- Loimaa, Finland
- Ogre, Latvia
- Skien, Norway
- Thisted, Denmark
- Uddevalla, Sweden

== K ==
Kadrina

- Janakkala, Finland

Kambja

- Toivakka, Finland

Keila

- Barsbüttel, Germany
- Birštonas, Lithuania
- (Georgia (country)) Chiatura, Georgia
- Huittinen, Finland
- Kerava, Finland
- Sigulda, Latvia

Kohtla-Järve

- Kėdainiai, Lithuania
- Kingiseppsky District, Russia
- Korostyshiv, Ukraine
- Norderstedt, Germany
- Outokumpu, Finland
- Salihorsk, Belarus
- Slantsevsky District, Russia
- Staffanstorp, Sweden
- Veliky Novgorod, Russia
- Wyszków, Poland

Kose

- Ócsa, Hungary
- Pagėgiai, Lithuania

Kuusalu

- Sipoo, Finland

== M ==
Maardu

- Białogard, Poland
- Bijelo Polje, Montenegro
- Chornomorsk, Ukraine
- Elektrėnai, Lithuania
- Frunzyenski (Minsk), Belarus
- Jēkabpils, Latvia
- Klaipėda District Municipality, Lithuania
- Myrhorod, Ukraine
- Prince George, Canada
- La Seyne-sur-Mer, France
- Sihanoukville, Cambodia
- Vanadzor, Armenia

Märjamaa

- Łącko, Poland
- Raahe, Finland
- Vara, Sweden

Muhu

- Utajärvi, Finland

== N ==
Narva

- Bălți, Moldova
- Bel Air, United States
- Elbląg, Poland
- Gorna Oryahovitsa, Bulgaria
- Karlskoga, Sweden
- (Georgia (country)) Kobuleti, Georgia
- Lahti, Finland

Narva-Jõesuu

- Imatra, Finland
- Kronstadt, Russia

Nõo

- Viitasaari, Finland

== O ==
Otepää

- Ekerö, Sweden
- Tarp, Germany
- Vihti, Finland

== P ==
Paide

- Annaberg-Buchholz, Germany
- Fredensborg, Denmark
- Håbo, Sweden
- Hamina, Finland
- Havířov, Czech Republic
- Jämijärvi, Finland
- Mažeikiai, Lithuania
- Pereiaslav, Ukraine
- Saldus, Latvia
- Westminster, United States

Pärnu

- Helsingborg, Sweden
- Jelgava, Latvia
- Ocean City, United States
- Oskarshamn, Sweden
- Portsmouth, United States
- Šiauliai, Lithuania
- Siófok, Hungary
- Södertälje, Sweden
- Vaasa, Finland

Põhja-Pärnumaa

- Alajärvi, Finland
- Ostrów Mazowiecka (rural gmina), Poland
- Rundāle, Latvia
- Pakruojis, Lithuania
- Uggiate-Trevano, Italy

Põhja-Sakala

- Fladungen, Germany
- Hajnówka, Poland
- Hône, Italy
- Iszkaszentgyörgy, Hungary
- Jokioinen, Finland
- Nora, Sweden
- Ukrainka, Ukraine
- Ulvila, Finland

Põltsamaa

- Kokemäki, Finland
- Mänttä-Vilppula, Finland
- Skrunda, Latvia
- Sollefteå, Sweden

Põlva is a member of the Charter of European Rural Communities, a town twinning association across the European Union. Põlva also has three other twin towns.

Charter of European Rural Communities

- Bienvenida, Spain
- Bièvre, Belgium
- Bucine, Italy
- (Republic of Ireland) Cashel, Ireland
- Cissé, France
- Desborough, England, United Kingdom
- Esch (Haaren), Netherlands
- Hepstedt, Germany
- Ibănești, Romania
- Kandava (Tukums), Latvia
- Kannus, Finland
- Kolindros, Greece
- Lassee, Austria
- Medzev, Slovakia
- Næstved, Denmark
- Nagycenk, Hungary
- Nadur, Malta
- Ockelbo, Sweden
- Pano Lefkara, Cyprus
- Samuel (Soure), Portugal
- Starý Poddvorov, Czech Republic
- Strzyżów, Poland
- Svoge, Bulgaria
- Tisno, Croatia
- Troisvierges, Luxembourg
- Žagarė (Joniškis), Lithuania

Other

- Balvi, Latvia
- Strugi Krasnye, Russia
- Ukmergė, Lithuania

== R ==
Rakvere

- Cēsis, Latvia
- Lappeenranta, Finland
- Lapua, Finland
- Lütjenburg, Germany
- Sigtuna, Sweden
- Panevėžys, Lithuania
- (Georgia (country)) Senaki, Georgia
- Szolnok, Hungary
- Vyshhorod, Ukraine

Räpina

- Gulbene, Latvia
- Kangasala, Finland
- Kulykivka, Ukraine
- Pechory, Russia

Rapla

- Kaiserslautern (district), Germany
- Raseiniai, Lithuania

Rõuge

- Alūksne, Latvia
- Vesilahti, Finland

== S ==
Saaremaa

- Gotland, Sweden
- Talsi, Latvia

Saku

- Liperi, Finland
- Saku, Japan
- Strängnäs, Sweden
- Sund, Åland Islands, Finland
- Tukums, Latvia
- Ylöjärvi, Finland

Saue

- Inčukalns, Latvia
- Montemarciano, Italy
- Quincy-sous-Sénart, France
- Sollentuna, Sweden

Sillamäe

- Brovary, Ukraine
- Bützow, Germany
- Havre de Grace, United States
- Mstsislaw, Belarus
- Nekrasovsky District, Russia

== T ==
Tallinn

- Annapolis, United States
- Dartford, England, United Kingdom
- Ghent, Belgium
- Groningen, Netherlands
- Kiel, Germany
- Kyiv, Ukraine
- Kotka, Finland
- Malmö, Sweden
- Riga, Latvia
- Schwerin, Germany
- Venice, Italy
- Vilnius, Lithuania

Tallinn – Kesklinn

- Carcassonne, France

Tartu

- Bærum, Norway
- Deventer, Netherlands
- Frederiksberg, Denmark
- Hafnarfjörður, Iceland
- Hämeenlinna, Finland
- Kaunas, Lithuania
- Lüneburg, Germany
- Riga, Latvia
- Salisbury, United States
- Tampere, Finland
- Turku, Finland
- Uppsala, Sweden
- Veszprém, Hungary

Tartu Parish

- Jyväskylä, Finland

Tõrva

- Baranivka, Ukraine
- Essunga, Sweden
- Hemsedal, Norway
- Grantsville, United States
- Laihia, Finland
- Lazdijai, Lithuania
- Łuków, Poland

Türi is a member of the Douzelage, a town twinning association of towns across the European Union. Türi also has several other twin towns.

Douzelage

- Agros, Cyprus
- Altea, Spain
- Asikkala, Finland
- Bad Kötzting, Germany
- Bellagio, Italy
- (Republic of Ireland) Bundoran, Ireland
- Chojna, Poland
- Granville, France
- Holstebro, Denmark
- Houffalize, Belgium
- Judenburg, Austria
- Kőszeg, Hungary
- Marsaskala, Malta
- Meerssen, Netherlands
- Niederanven, Luxembourg
- Oxelösund, Sweden
- Preveza, Greece
- Rokiškis, Lithuania
- Rovinj, Croatia
- Sesimbra, Portugal
- Sherborne, England, United Kingdom
- Sigulda, Latvia
- Siret, Romania
- Škofja Loka, Slovenia
- Sušice, Czech Republic
- Tryavna, Bulgaria
- Zvolen, Slovakia

Other

- Åmål, Sweden
- Frogn, Norway
- Ingå, Finland
- Karkkila, Finland
- Loimaa, Finland
- Prienai, Lithuania
- Säkylä, Finland
- Siuntio, Finland

== V ==
Väike-Maarja

- Hausjärvi, Finland
- Sirdal, Norway
- Sonkajärvi, Finland

Valga

- Durbuy, Belgium
- (Georgia (country)) Kobuleti, Georgia
- Kobylnica, Poland
- Kościelisko, Poland
- Marijampolė, Lithuania
- Oakland, United States
- Orimattila, Finland
- Östhammar, Sweden
- Tvrdošín, Slovakia
- Valka, Latvia

Viimsi

- Barleben, Germany
- Porvoo, Finland
- Ramat Yishai, Israel
- Ski, Norway
- Sulejówek, Poland
- Täby, Sweden

Viljandi

- Ahrensburg, Germany
- Cumberland, United States
- Eslöv, Sweden
- Frostburg, United States
- Härnösand, Sweden
- Kretinga, Lithuania
- Porvoo, Finland
- (Georgia (country)) Telavi, Georgia
- Ternopil, Ukraine
- Valmiera, Latvia

Vinni

- Ljusdal, Sweden
- Panevėžys District Municipality, Lithuania
- Tuusula, Finland

Viru-Nigula

- Akmenė, Lithuania
- Dobele, Latvia
- Comrat, Moldova
- Criuleni District, Moldova
- Karvia, Finland

Võru

- Alūksne, Latvia
- Bad Segeberg, Germany
- Chambray-lès-Tours, France
- Härryda, Sweden
- Iisalmi, Finland
- Joniškis, Lithuania
- Kaniv, Ukraine
- Laitila, Finland
- Landskrona, Sweden
- Smolyan, Bulgaria
- Suwałki, Poland
