= List of twin towns and sister cities in Croatia =

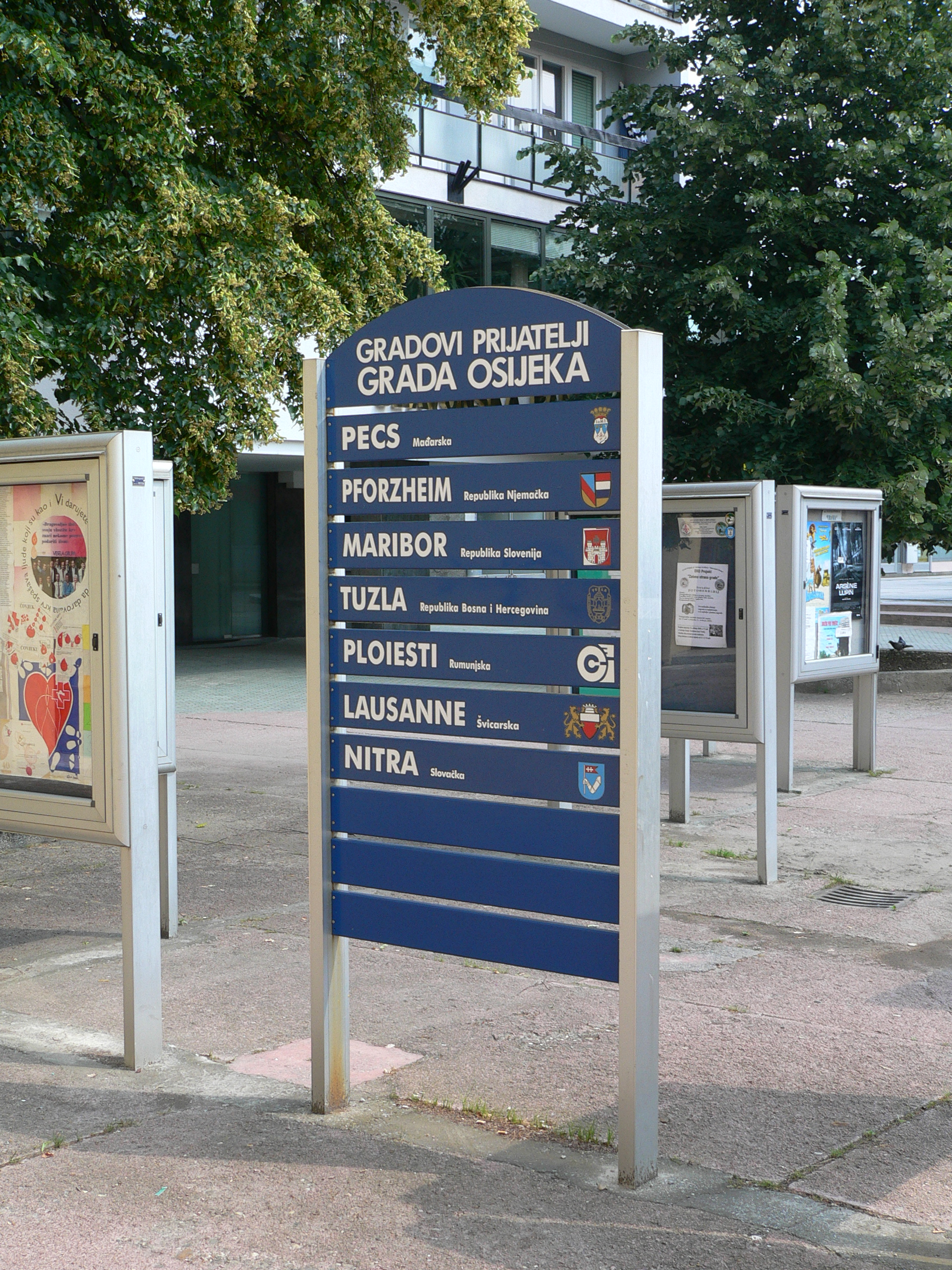
A board showing twin towns of Osijek

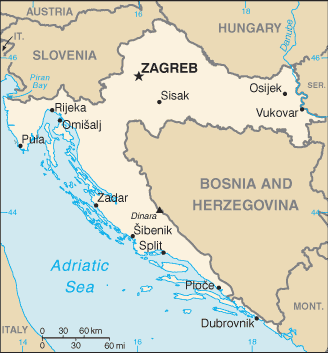
Map of Croatia

This is a list of municipalities in Croatia which have standing links to local communities in other countries known as "town twinning" (usually in Europe) or "sister cities" (usually in the rest of the world).

== B ==
Barban

- Brda, Slovenia

Beli Manastir

- Cambridge, United States
- Mohács, Hungary

Benkovac

- Chorvátsky Grob, Slovakia
- Jarovce (Bratislava), Slovakia

Biograd na Moru

- Felsőnyék, Hungary
- Kressbronn am Bodensee, Germany
- Kyjov, Czech Republic
- Moravske Toplice, Slovenia
- Porto San Giorgio, Italy
- Radlje ob Dravi, Slovenia
- Slovenske Konjice, Slovenia
- Stará Ľubovňa, Slovakia
- Stolac, Bosnia and Herzegovina
- Székesfehérvár, Hungary
- Tolfa, Italy
- Tomislavgrad, Bosnia and Herzegovina
- Villamagna, Italy

Bjelovar

- Ascoli Piceno Province, Italy
- Rubiera, Italy
- Tomislavgrad, Bosnia and Herzegovina
- Visoko, Bosnia and Herzegovina

== C ==
Čakovec

- Blagoevgrad, Bulgaria
- Kiryat Tiv'on, Israel
- Nagykanizsa, Hungary
- Płońsk, Poland
- Schramberg, Germany
- Szigetvár, Hungary

Čazma

- Hévíz, Hungary

Crikvenica

- Harkány, Hungary
- Kidričevo, Slovenia
- Orlová, Czech Republic
- Saint-Dié-des-Vosges, France
- Verbania, Italy

== D ==
Đakovo

- Kirchenthumbach, Germany
- Malgersdorf, Germany
- Ravne na Koroškem, Slovenia
- Tomislavgrad, Bosnia and Herzegovina

Daruvar

- Letohrad, Czech Republic
- Prague 15 (Prague), Czech Republic
- Siófok, Hungary

Donja Stubica

- Rodgau, Germany

Donji Miholjac

- Siklós, Hungary

Dubrovnik

- Bad Homburg vor der Höhe, Germany
- Beyoğlu, Turkey
- Graz, Austria
- Helsingborg, Sweden
- Monterey, United States
- Ragusa, Italy
- Ravenna Province, Italy
- Rueil-Malmaison, France
- Sanya, China
- Venezia, Italy

Duga Resa

- Črnomelj, Slovenia

== G ==
Garešnica

- Balatonlelle, Hungary
- Orašje, Bosnia and Herzegovina

Gospić

- Kupres, Bosnia and Herzegovina
- Ružomberok, Slovakia
- Sieradz, Poland

== H ==
Hvar

- Santa Maria di Sala, Italy
- Tacoma, United States

== J ==
Jastrebarsko

- Sungurlare, Bulgaria
- Trenčianska Teplá, Slovakia

Jelsa

- Sankt Andrä, Austria

== K ==
Karlovac

- Alessandria, Italy
- Erzsébetváros (Budapest), Hungary
- Kansas City, United States
- Kragujevac, Serbia

Kaštela

- Bardejov, Slovakia
- Hradec Králové, Czech Republic
- Kiseljak, Bosnia and Herzegovina
- Kupres, Bosnia and Herzegovina
- Lindlar, Germany
- Pszczyna, Poland
- Yountville, United States

Knin

- Shkodër, Albania
- Tomislavgrad, Bosnia and Herzegovina

Kolan

- Starše, Slovenia

Koprivnica

- Arilje, Serbia
- Čapljina, Bosnia and Herzegovina
- Domžale, Slovenia
- Kaposvár, Hungary
- Nikšić, Montenegro

Križevci

- Čitluk, Bosnia and Herzegovina
- Kočani, North Macedonia
- Nagyatád, Hungary
- Reana del Rojale, Italy
- Slovenske Konjice, Slovenia

== L ==
Labin

- Baja, Hungary
- Banovići, Bosnia and Herzegovina
- Carbonia, Italy
- Idrija, Slovenia
- Manzano, Italy
- Rybnik, Poland
- Sandnes, Norway
- Sospirolo, Italy

Lipik

- Abano Terme, Italy
- Birštonas, Lithuania
- Coucy-le-Château-Auffrique, France
- Drohobych, Ukraine
- Igal, Hungary
- Neustadt an der Aisch, Germany

Lovran

- Bleiburg, Austria
- Castel San Pietro Terme, Italy
- Hurbanovo, Slovakia
- Rákosmente (Budapest), Hungary

== M ==
Makarska

- Budva, Montenegro
- Kavadarci, North Macedonia
- Olomouc, Czech Republic
- Stari Grad (Sarajevo), Bosnia and Herzegovina
- Travnik, Bosnia and Herzegovina

Matulji

- Brda, Slovenia
- Castel San Pietro Terme, Italy

Medulin

- Cerklje na Gorenjskem, Slovenia
- Gmünd, Austria
- Marcali, Hungary
- Montecarotto, Italy
- Pöls-Oberkurzheim, Austria
- Porto Tolle, Italy

Motovun

- Chrudim, Czech Republic

== N ==
Našice

- Zlaté Moravce, Slovakia

Nin

- Łubowo, Poland
- Nová Baňa, Slovakia
- Pestszentlőrinc-Pestszentimre (Budapest), Hungary
- Tomislavgrad, Bosnia and Herzegovina

Novalja

- Abenberg, Germany
- Mikulov, Czech Republic

Novigrad

- La Réole, France
- Sacile, Italy

Novska

- Tomislavgrad, Bosnia and Herzegovina
- Le Touvet, France

== O ==
Ogulin

- Dombóvár, Hungary
- Gignac, France

Omiš

- Havířov, Czech Republic
- Nepomuk, Czech Republic
- San Felice del Molise, Italy
- Zagorje ob Savi, Slovenia

Opatija

- Bad Ischl, Austria
- Balatonfüred, Hungary
- Carmagnola, Italy
- Castel San Pietro Terme, Italy
- Ilirska Bistrica, Slovenia
- Kołobrzeg, Poland

Orahovica

- Bačka Topola, Serbia
- Orfű, Hungary

Osijek

- Bitola, North Macedonia
- Budapest XIII (Budapest), Hungary
- Canada Bay, Australia
- Elbasan, Albania
- Huanggang, China
- Lausanne, Switzerland
- Maribor, Slovenia
- Mostar, Bosnia and Herzegovina
- Nitra, Slovakia
- Pécs, Hungary
- Pforzheim, Germany
- Ploieşti, Romania
- Prizren, Kosovo
- Subotica, Serbia
- Tuzla, Bosnia and Herzegovina
- Vicenza, Italy

Otočac

- Nova Gorica, Slovenia

== P ==
Pag

- Carbonera, Italy
- Kozármisleny, Hungary
- Mukachevo, Ukraine
- Slavkov u Brna, Czech Republic
- Szigetvár, Hungary
- Zanè, Italy

Pakrac

- Budva, Montenegro
- Dolný Kubín, Slovakia
- Jasenová, Slovakia
- Postřekov, Czech Republic
- Revúca, Slovakia

Petrinja

- Piotrków Trybunalski, Poland

Ploče

- Ljubljana, Slovenia

Podstrana

- Murska Sobota, Slovenia

Poreč

- Massa Lombarda, Italy
- Monselice, Italy
- Poing, Germany
- Prague 6 (Prague), Czech Republic
- Segrate, Italy
- Siófok, Hungary

Pula

- Budaörs, Hungary
- Graz, Austria
- Hekinan, Japan
- Imola, Italy
- Katowice, Poland
- Kranj, Slovenia
- Lviv, Ukraine
- Novorossiysk, Russia
- Sarajevo, Bosnia and Herzegovina
- Szeged, Hungary
- Trier, Germany
- Uzhhorod, Ukraine
- Verona, Italy
- Villefranche-de-Rouergue, France

== R ==
Rab

- Kočevje, Slovenia
- Königsbrunn, Germany
- Montegiardino, San Marino
- San Marino, San Marino
- Sežana, Slovenia

Rijeka

- Bitola, North Macedonia
- Burgas, Bulgaria
- Cetinje, Montenegro
- Csepel (Budapest), Hungary
- Este, Italy
- Faenza, Italy
- Genoa, Italy
- Kawasaki, Japan
- Ljubljana, Slovenia
- Neuss, Germany
- Qingdao, China
- Rostock, Germany
- Trieste, Italy

Rovinj is a member of the Douzelage, a town twinning association of towns across the European Union. Rovinj also has three other twin towns.

Douzelage

- Agros, Cyprus
- Altea, Spain
- Asikkala, Finland
- Bad Kötzting, Germany
- Bellagio, Italy
- (Republic of Ireland) Bundoran, Ireland
- Chojna, Poland
- Granville, France
- Holstebro, Denmark
- Houffalize, Belgium
- Judenburg, Austria
- Kőszeg, Hungary
- Marsaskala, Malta
- Meerssen, Netherlands
- Niederanven, Luxembourg
- Oxelösund, Sweden
- Preveza, Greece
- Rokiškis, Lithuania
- Sesimbra, Portugal
- Sherborne, England, United Kingdom
- Sigulda, Latvia
- Siret, Romania
- Škofja Loka, Slovenia
- Sušice, Czech Republic
- Tryavna, Bulgaria
- Türi, Estonia
- Zvolen, Slovakia

Other

- Adria, Italy
- Camaiore, Italy
- Leonberg, Germany

== S ==
Samobor

- Chassieu, France
- Parabiago, Italy
- Veles, North Macedonia
- Wirges, Germany

Selca

- Jasenovo, Slovakia
- Revúca, Slovakia
- Zázrivá, Slovakia

Semeljci

- Bisingen, Germany
- Szemely, Hungary

Senj

- Kőszeg, Hungary
- Parndorf, Austria
- Senec, Slovakia
- Sorbiers, France
- Vratimov, Czech Republic

Šibenik

- Civitanova Marche, Italy
- Herford (district), Germany
- Humenné, Slovakia
- Muggia, Italy
- San Benedetto del Tronto, Italy
- Voiron, France

Sisak

- Celje, Slovenia
- Gabrovo, Bulgaria
- Heidenheim an der Brenz, Germany
- Remchingen, Germany
- Zeytinburnu, Turkey

Slatina

- Szigetvár, Hungary

Slavonski Brod

- Celje, Slovenia

Slunj

- Castel San Giovanni, Italy
- Grude, Bosnia and Herzegovina

Solin

- Tomislavgrad, Bosnia and Herzegovina

Split

- Ancona, Italy
- Antofagasta, Chile
- Beit Shemesh, Israel
- Charlottenburg-Wilmersdorf (Berlin), Germany
- Cockburn, Australia
- Dover, England, United Kingdom
- Gladsaxe, Denmark
- Hangzhou, China
- Los Angeles, United States
- Mostar, Bosnia and Herzegovina
- Odesa, Ukraine
- Ostrava, Czech Republic
- Rzeszów, Poland
- Štip, North Macedonia
- Trondheim, Norway
- Velenje, Slovenia

Stari Grad

- Bohinj, Slovenia
- Kunštát, Czech Republic
- Letovice, Czech Republic
- Paros, Greece
- Szentendre, Hungary
- Velke Opatovice, Czech Republic
- Zagorje ob Savi, Slovenia

Sveti Filip i Jakov

- Mohács, Hungary

Sveti Martin na Muri

- Busko-Zdrój, Poland
- Szigetszentmiklós, Hungary

== T ==
Tisno is a member of the Charter of European Rural Communities, a town twinning association across the European Union. Tisno also has two other twin towns.

Charter of European Rural Communities

- Bienvenida, Spain
- Bièvre, Belgium
- Bucine, Italy
- (Republic of Ireland) Cashel, Ireland
- Cissé, France
- Desborough, England, United Kingdom
- Esch (Haaren), Netherlands
- Hepstedt, Germany
- Ibănești, Romania
- Kandava (Tukums), Latvia
- Kannus, Finland
- Kolindros, Greece
- Lassee, Austria
- Medzev, Slovakia
- Næstved, Denmark
- Nagycenk, Hungary
- Nadur, Malta
- Ockelbo, Sweden
- Pano Lefkara, Cyprus
- Põlva, Estonia
- Samuel (Soure), Portugal
- Starý Poddvorov, Czech Republic
- Strzyżów, Poland
- Svoge, Bulgaria
- Troisvierges, Luxembourg
- Žagarė (Joniškis), Lithuania

Other

- Caravaggio, Italy
- Velké Meziříčí, Czech Republic

Trogir

- Bakhchysarai, Ukraine
- Hajdúböszörmény, Hungary
- Harkány, Hungary
- Kotor, Montenegro
- Kranjska Gora, Slovenia
- Kraśnik, Poland
- Montesilvano, Italy
- Porto Sant'Elpidio, Italy
- Prague 5 (Prague), Czech Republic
- Ruse, Bulgaria
- Sarlat-la-Canéda, France
- Słupca, Poland
- Tione di Trento, Italy
- Tivat, Montenegro
- Újbuda (Budapest), Hungary
- Uzhhorod, Ukraine
- Vaterstetten, Germany
- Yalova, Turkey

== V ==
Valpovo

- Biała Rawska, Poland
- Komló, Hungary
- Kupres, Bosnia and Herzegovina

Varaždin

- Bad Radkersburg, Austria
- Koblenz, Germany
- Montale, Italy
- Ptuj, Slovenia
- Ravensburg, Germany
- Schaffhausen, Switzerland
- Trnava, Slovakia
- Zalaegerszeg, Hungary

Varaždinske Toplice

- Piešťany, Slovakia

Vela Luka

- Anacortes, United States

Vinkovci

- Camponogara, Italy
- Kenzingen, Germany
- Kőbánya (Budapest), Hungary
- Ohrid, North Macedonia
- Široki Brijeg, Bosnia and Herzegovina

Virovitica

- Barcs, Hungary
- Jajce, Bosnia and Herzegovina
- Traunreut, Germany
- Vyškov, Czech Republic

Vis

- Piran, Slovenia

Vrbovec

- Kispest (Budapest), Hungary
- Périers, France

Vrgorac

- Reșița, Romania
- Vsetín, Czech Republic

Vukovar

- Bač, Serbia
- Bački Petrovac, Serbia
- Dunaújváros, Hungary
- Mostar, Bosnia and Herzegovina
- Odžak, Bosnia and Herzegovina
- Partizánske, Slovakia

== Z ==
Zabok

- Puconci, Slovenia
- Sanmenxia, China

Zadar

- Ancona, Italy
- Banská Bystrica, Slovakia
- Dundee, Scotland, United Kingdom
- Fürstenfeldbruck, Germany
- Iquique, Chile
- Milwaukee, United States
- Padua, Italy
- Reggio Emilia, Italy
- Romans-sur-Isère, France
- Székesfehérvár, Hungary
- Terézváros (Budapest), Hungary

Zagreb

- Ankara, Turkey
- Bologna, Italy
- Brno, Czech Republic
- Budapest, Hungary
- Kyoto, Japan
- Ljubljana, Slovenia
- Kraków, Poland
- Mainz, Germany
- Molise, Italy
- Pécs, Hungary
- Pittsburgh, United States
- Pristina, Kosovo
- Saint Petersburg, Russia
- Shanghai, China
- Skopje, North Macedonia
- Sofia, Bulgaria
- Tromsø, Norway
- Xiangyang, China
