= List of twin towns and sister cities in Lithuania =

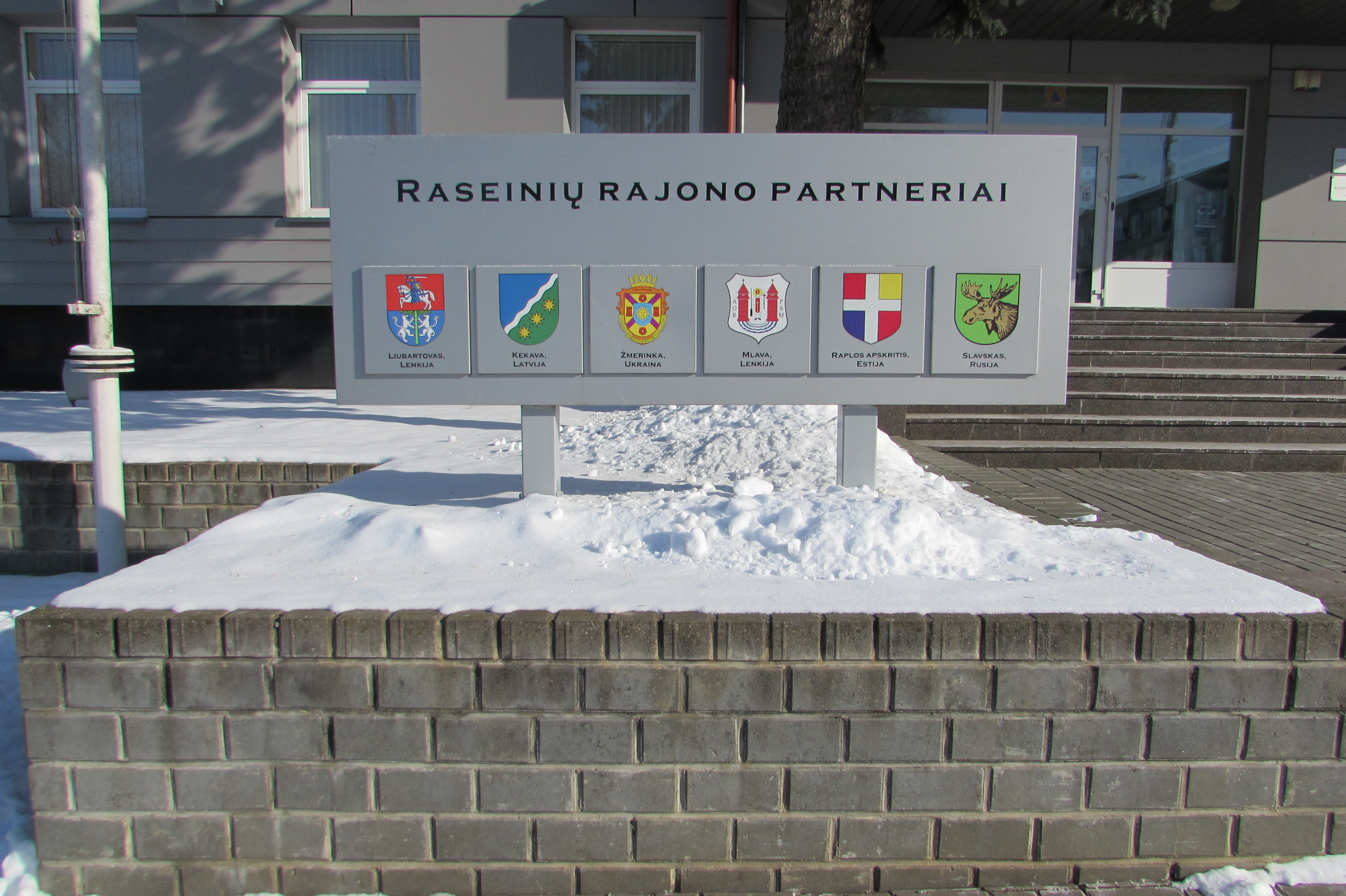
Twin towns of Raseiniai

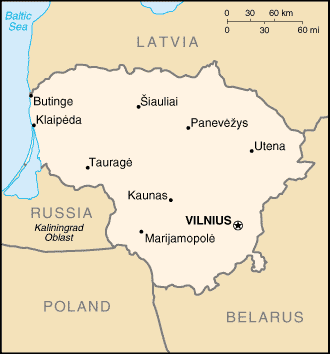
Map of Lithuania

This is a list of municipalities in Lithuania which have standing links to local communities in other countries known as "town twinning" (usually in Europe) or "sister cities" (usually in the rest of the world).

== A ==
Akmenė

- Dobele, Latvia
- Konin, Poland
- Mariupol, Ukraine
- Mukawa, Japan
- Ölfus, Iceland
- (Georgia (country)) Rustavi, Georgia
- Shostka, Ukraine
- Skhidnytsia, Ukraine
- Viru-Nigula, Estonia

Alytus

- Berdychiv, Ukraine
- Botkyrka, Sweden
- Cēsis, Latvia
- Ełk, Poland
- General San Martín, Argentina
- Giżycko County, Poland
- Kremenchuk, Ukraine
- Næstved, Denmark
- Opole, Poland
- Ostrołęka, Poland
- Rochester, United States
- Suwałki, Poland
- Vélizy-Villacoublay, France

Anykščiai

- Aglona, Latvia
- Dalaman, Turkey
- Dobele, Latvia
- Krupina, Slovakia
- Madona, Latvia
- Myrhorod, Ukraine
- Nepomuk, Czech Republic
- Ödeshög, Sweden
- Os, Norway
- Sassenage, France
- Sejny, Poland
- (Georgia (country)) Telavi, Georgia
- Uniejów, Poland
- Vasylkiv, Ukraine

== B ==
Birštonas

- Ağstafa, Azerbaijan
- Bykle, Norway
- (Georgia (country)) Chiatura, Georgia
- La Croix-en-Touraine, France
- Ełk County, Poland
- Keila, Estonia
- Leck, Germany
- Lipik, Croatia
- Netanya, Israel
- Sigulda, Latvia
- Sysmä, Finland
- Żnin, Poland

Biržai

- Aizkraukle, Latvia
- Bauska, Latvia
- Grodzisk Wielkopolski, Poland
- Tczew, Poland
- Vecumnieki, Latvia
- Werder, Germany

== D ==
Druskininkai

- Augustów, Poland
- Elbląg, Poland
- Strzelce Opolskie, Poland

== E ==
Elektrėnai

- Bruck an der Leitha District, Austria
- Forlì, Italy
- Maardu, Estonia
- Nowy Dwór Mazowiecki, Poland
- Zhovkva Raion, Ukraine

== I ==
Ignalina

- Büren, Germany
- Østfold, Norway
- Prachatice, Czech Republic
- Serock, Poland

== J ==
Jonava

- Děčín, Czech Republic
- Jõgeva, Estonia
- Kędzierzyn-Koźle, Poland
- Riihimäki, Finland
- Pucioasa, Romania
- Smila, Ukraine
- Vadul lui Vodă, Moldova
- (Georgia (country)) Zugdidi, Georgia

Joniškis

- Alūksne, Latvia
- Bauska, Latvia
- Dobele, Latvia
- Jelgava Municipality, Latvia
- Konin, Poland
- Novoselytsia, Ukraine
- Sulingen, Germany
- Ungheni, Moldova
- Vimmerby, Sweden
- Võru, Estonia

Joniškis – Žagarė is a member of the Charter of European Rural Communities, a town twinning association across the European Union, alongside with:

- Bienvenida, Spain
- Bièvre, Belgium
- Bucine, Italy
- (Republic of Ireland) Cashel, Ireland
- Cissé, France
- Desborough, England, United Kingdom
- Esch (Haaren), Netherlands
- Hepstedt, Germany
- Ibănești, Romania
- Kandava (Tukums), Latvia
- Kannus, Finland
- Kolindros, Greece
- Lassee, Austria
- Medzev, Slovakia
- Næstved, Denmark
- Nagycenk, Hungary
- Nadur, Malta
- Ockelbo, Sweden
- Pano Lefkara, Cyprus
- Põlva, Estonia
- Samuel (Soure), Portugal
- Starý Poddvorov, Czech Republic
- Strzyżów, Poland
- Svoge, Bulgaria
- Tisno, Croatia
- Troisvierges, Luxembourg

Jurbarkas

- Crailsheim, Germany
- Criuleni, Moldova
- Hajnówka, Poland
- Laakdal, Belgium
- Lichtenberg (Berlin), Germany
- Ryn, Poland

== K ==
Kaišiadorys

- (Georgia (country)) Baghdati, Georgia
- Będzin, Poland
- Hola Prystan, Ukraine
- Jõgeva, Estonia
- Obukhiv, Ukraine
- Twistringen, Germany

Kaunas

- Białystok, Poland
- Brno, Czech Republic
- Cava de' Tirreni, Italy
- Grenoble, France
- Kharkiv, Ukraine
- Linköping, Sweden
- Lippe (district), Germany
- Los Angeles, United States
- Lutsk, Ukraine
- Lviv Oblast, Ukraine
- Myślibórz, Poland
- Odense, Denmark
- Rende, Italy
- Rishon LeZion, Israel
- San Martín, Argentina
- Tampere, Finland
- Tartu, Estonia
- Toruń, Poland
- Växjö, Sweden
- Vestfold og Telemark, Norway
- Vestland, Norway
- Wrocław, Poland
- Xiamen, China
- Yaotsu, Japan

Kazlų Rūda

- Frombork, Poland
- Gołdap County, Poland
- Koriukivka, Ukraine
- Lwówek, Poland
- Olecko, Poland
- (Georgia (country)) Oni, Georgia
- Sondershausen, Germany

Kėdainiai

- Brodnica, Poland
- Fălticeni, Romania
- Kohtla-Järve, Estonia
- Łobez, Poland
- Melitopol, Ukraine
- Sömmerda, Germany
- Svalöv, Sweden
- (Georgia (country)) Telavi, Georgia

Kelmė

- Biłgoraj, Poland
- Gallese, Italy
- Hódmezővásárhely, Hungary
- Lienen, Germany
- Miastko, Poland
- Novovolynsk, Ukraine
- Ogre, Latvia
- Östra Göinge, Sweden
- Sankt Veit an der Glan, Austria
- Wartburg (district), Germany

Klaipėda

- Cleveland, United States
- Debrecen, Hungary
- Gdynia, Poland
- Karlskrona, Sweden
- Kotka, Finland
- Kuji, Japan
- Liepāja, Latvia
- Lübeck, Germany
- Mannheim, Germany
- Mersin, Turkey
- North Tyneside, England, United Kingdom
- Sassnitz, Germany
- Szczecin, Poland

Klaipėda District Municipality

- Iława, Poland
- Maardu, Estonia

Kretinga

- Blankenfelde-Mahlow, Germany
- Bornholm, Denmark
- Gribskov, Denmark
- Märkisch-Oderland (district), Germany
- Osby, Sweden
- Viljandi, Estonia

Kupiškis

- Balvi, Latvia
- Jēkabpils, Latvia
- Kežmarok, Slovakia
- (Georgia (country)) Lanchkhuti, Georgia
- Manevychi Raion, Ukraine
- Rēzekne Municipality, Latvia
- Sztum, Poland
- Zgierz, Poland

== L ==
Lazdijai

- (Georgia (country)) Ambrolauri, Georgia
- Augustów County, Poland
- Baranivka, Ukraine
- Holmestrand, Norway
- Łuków, Poland
- Płaska, Poland
- Puńsk, Poland
- Sejny, Poland
- Tomelilla, Sweden
- Tõrva, Estonia
- Wieleń, Poland

== M ==
Marijampolė

- Bergisch Gladbach, Germany
- Kokkola, Finland
- Kvam, Norway
- Lesja, Norway
- (Republic of Ireland) Mayo, Ireland
- Piotrków Trybunalski, Poland
- Reșița, Romania
- Rogoźno, Poland
- Suwałki, Poland
- Suwałki (rural gmina), Poland
- Valga, Estonia
- Valka, Latvia
- Viborg, Denmark

Mažeikiai

- Havelberg, Germany
- Havířov, Czech Republic
- Lebedyn, Ukraine
- Paide, Estonia
- Płock, Poland
- Saldus, Latvia

Molėtai

- (Georgia (country)) Chkhorotsqu, Georgia
- Hörstel, Germany
- Ludza, Latvia
- Maków, Poland
- Romaniv Raion, Ukraine

== N ==
Neringa

- Fehmarn, Germany
- Jaunjelgava, Latvia
- Łeba, Poland
- Pāvilosta, Latvia
- Saulkrasti, Latvia

== P ==
Pagėgiai

- Bad Iburg, Germany
- Iława (rural gmina), Poland
- Kose, Estonia
- Lomma, Sweden
- Zbarazh Raion, Ukraine

Pakruojis

- Bauska, Latvia
- (Georgia (country)) Gurjaani, Georgia
- Põhja-Pärnumaa, Estonia
- Kozłowo, Poland
- Raunheim, Germany
- Rundāle, Latvia
- Rypin, Poland
- Uggiate-Trevano, Italy

Palanga

- Bergen auf Rügen, Germany
- Bucha, Ukraine
- Eilat, Israel
- Jūrmala, Latvia
- (Georgia (country)) Kobuleti, Georgia
- Liepāja, Latvia
- Simrishamn, Sweden
- Ustka, Poland

Panevėžys

- Daugavpils, Latvia
- Gabrovo, Bulgaria
- Kalmar, Sweden
- Lublin, Poland
- Lünen, Germany
- Maramureș County, Romania
- Rakvere, Estonia
- Ramla, Israel
- (Georgia (country)) Rustavi, Georgia
- Toyohashi, Japan
- Vinnytsia, Ukraine

Panevėžys District Municipality

- (Georgia (country)) Akhmeta, Georgia
- het Bildt (Waadhoeke), Netherlands
- Ialoveni District, Moldova
- Limbaži, Latvia
- Lubicz, Poland
- Maramureș County, Romania
- Vinni, Estonia

Pasvalys

- Bauska, Latvia
- (Georgia (country)) Chokhatauri, Georgia
- Drangedal, Norway
- Götene, Sweden
- Iecava, Latvia
- Liévin, France
- Liubar Raion, Ukraine
- Obernkirchen, Germany
- Żory, Poland

Plungė

- Bjerkreim, Norway
- Boxholm, Sweden
- Bruntál, Czech Republic
- Golub-Dobrzyń, Poland
- Konotop, Ukraine
- (Georgia (country)) Kvareli, Georgia
- Menden, Germany
- Tukums, Latvia
- Viljandi County, Estonia

Prienai

- Asikkala, Finland
- Bitetto, Italy
- Busk, Ukraine
- (Georgia (country)) Dusheti, Georgia
- Kętrzyn (rural gmina), Poland
- Lubań, Poland
- Parczew, Poland
- Talsi, Latvia
- Türi, Estonia

== R ==
Radviliškis

- Bauska, Latvia
- Daliyat al-Karmel, Israel
- Gniezno, Poland
- Grodzisk Mazowiecki, Poland
- Kadzidło, Poland
- (Georgia (country)) Khashuri, Georgia
- Saint-Seine-l'Abbaye, France
- Skara, Sweden
- Uman, Ukraine

Raseiniai

- Ķekava, Latvia
- Lubartów, Poland
- Mława, Poland
- Ourém, Portugal
- Rapla, Estonia
- Zhmerynka Raion, Ukraine

Rietavas

- Gulbene, Latvia
- Kętrzyn (rural gmina), Poland
- Saerbeck, Germany

Rokiškis is a member of the Douzelage, a town twinning association of towns across the European Union. Rokiškis also has several other twin towns.

Douzelage

- Agros, Cyprus
- Altea, Spain
- Asikkala, Finland
- Bad Kötzting, Germany
- Bellagio, Italy
- (Republic of Ireland) Bundoran, Ireland
- Chojna, Poland
- Granville, France
- Holstebro, Denmark
- Houffalize, Belgium
- Judenburg, Austria
- Kőszeg, Hungary
- Marsaskala, Malta
- Meerssen, Netherlands
- Niederanven, Luxembourg
- Oxelösund, Sweden
- Preveza, Greece
- Rovinj, Croatia
- Sesimbra, Portugal
- Sherborne, England, United Kingdom
- Sigulda, Latvia
- Siret, Romania
- Škofja Loka, Slovenia
- Sušice, Czech Republic
- Tryavna, Bulgaria
- Türi, Estonia
- Zvolen, Slovakia

Other

- Augšdaugava, Latvia
- Borșa, Romania
- Cēsis, Latvia
- Estenfeld, Germany
- Harbin, China
- Jēkabpils, Latvia
- Ludza, Latvia
- (Georgia (country)) Ozurgeti, Georgia
- Pabianice, Poland
- Provadia, Bulgaria
- Tamsalu (Tapa), Estonia
- Viesīte, Latvia

== S ==
Šalčininkai

- Arnage, France
- Bełchatów County, Poland
- Hude, Germany
- Kadzidło, Poland
- Kaźmierz, Poland
- Kętrzyn County, Poland
- Łowicz, Poland
- Nowe Miasto Lubawskie, Poland
- Płońsk, Poland
- Praga (Warsaw), Poland
- Stare Miasto, Poland
- Szczytno, Poland
- Tarnowo Podgórne, Poland
- Warsaw West County, Poland
- Wolsztyn County, Poland
- Wschowa, Poland
- Żnin, Poland
- Zviahel, Ukraine

Šiauliai

- Etten-Leur, Netherlands
- Fredericia, Denmark
- Jelgava, Latvia
- Khmelnytskyi, Ukraine
- Omaha, United States
- Pärnu, Estonia
- Plauen, Germany

Šilalė

- Borshchiv, Ukraine
- Kraśnik, Poland
- Lund, Norway
- Stavenhagen, Germany
- Tukums, Latvia

Šilutė

- Alanya, Turkey
- Bessarabske, Ukraine
- Cittaducale, Italy
- Emmerich am Rhein, Germany
- Gdańsk County, Poland
- Ljungby, Sweden
- Ostróda (rural gmina), Poland
- Pruszcz Gdański, Poland
- Saldus, Latvia
- Skadovsk, Ukraine
- Vellinge, Sweden

Švenčionys

- (Kazakhstan) Akkol District, Kazakhstah
- Mrągowo County, Poland
- Rumia, Poland
- Świdnica, Poland
- Virovitica-Podravina County, Croatia
- Wejherowo County, Poland
- Węgrów, Poland

== T ==
Tauragė

- Bełchatów, Poland
- Bytów, Poland
- Ostróda, Poland
- Považská Bystrica, Slovakia
- Riedstadt, Germany
- Ternopil, Ukraine
- (Georgia (country)) Zestaponi, Georgia

Telšiai

- Bassum, Germany
- Krnov, Czech Republic
- Lebedyn, Ukraine
- Liezen, Austria
- (Georgia (country)) Mestia, Georgia
- Mińsk Mazowiecki, Poland
- Obdach, Austria
- Saint-Égrève, France
- Sävsjö, Sweden
- Steinfurt (district), Germany

Trakai

- Acre, Israel
- Alanya, Turkey
- Avola, Italy
- Giżycko, Poland
- Giżycko (rural gmina), Poland
- Ivano-Frankivsk, Ukraine
- Koszalin, Poland
- Lutsk, Ukraine
- Malbork, Poland
- (Georgia (country)) Mtskheta, Georgia
- Nowy Sącz, Poland
- Qazax, Azerbaijan
- Rheine, Germany
- Schönebeck, Germany
- Västra Götaland County, Sweden

== U ==
Ukmergė

- Cologno al Serio, Italy
- Herrljunga, Sweden
- Kamianets-Podilskyi, Ukraine
- Kiskunmajsa, Hungary
- Korosten, Ukraine
- Krasyliv, Ukraine
- Līvāni, Latvia
- Mariestad, Sweden
- Põlva, Estonia
- Tarnowo Podgórne, Poland
- (Georgia (country)) Tsalenjikha, Georgia
- Unstrut-Hainich (district), Germany
- Västra Götaland County, Sweden
- Wetterau (district), Germany
- Worcester, England, United Kingdom

Utena

- Beit Sahour, Palestine
- Chełm, Poland
- Kovel, Ukraine
- Lidköping, Sweden
- Pontinia, Italy
- Preiļi, Latvia
- Rēzekne, Latvia
- Třeboň, Czech Republic

== V ==
Varėna

- Bartoszyce, Poland
- Ełk, Poland
- Giżycko, Poland
- Giżycko County, Poland
- Mikołajki, Poland
- Orzysz, Poland
- Prenzlau, Germany
- Szemud, Poland

Vilkaviškis

- Kowale Oleckie, Poland
- Marly, France
- Olecko, Poland
- Ruciane-Nida, Poland
- Suchowola, Poland

Vilnius

- Aalborg, Denmark
- Almaty, Kazakhstan
- Astana, Kazakhstan
- Chicago, United States
- Dnipro, Ukraine
- Donetsk, Ukraine
- Duisburg, Germany
- Erfurt, Germany
- Gdańsk, Poland
- Guangzhou, China
- Joensuu, Finland
- Kyiv, Ukraine
- Kraków, Poland
- Łódź, Poland
- Madison, United States
- Pavia, Italy
- Reykjavík, Iceland
- Riga, Latvia
- Salzburg, Austria
- Taipei, Taiwan
- Tallinn, Estonia
- (Georgia (country)) Tbilisi, Georgia
- Warsaw, Poland

Vilnius District Municipality

- Białe Błota, Poland
- Birkenwerder, Germany
- Czarny Bór, Poland
- Dessau-Roßlau, Germany
- Dopiewo, Poland
- Komorniki, Poland
- Koronowo, Poland
- Knyszyn, Poland
- Krotoszyn, Poland
- Miłomłyn, Poland
- Międzyrzec Podlaski, Poland
- Olsztynek, Poland
- Pasym, Poland
- Poraj, Poland
- Radom, Poland
- Reda, Poland
- Rybnik, Poland
- Sambir, Ukraine
- Siedlce, Poland
- Sulejówek, Poland
- Węgorzewo, Poland
- Wysokie Mazowieckie, Poland

Visaginas

- Dagda, Latvia
- Daugavpils, Latvia
- Lidzbark Warmiński, Poland
- Slavutych, Ukraine
- Zambrów, Poland

== Z ==
Zarasai

- Augšdaugava, Latvia
- Ballan-Miré, France
- Jēkabpils, Latvia
- Mottafollone, Italy
- Senglea, Malta
- Zduńska Wola, Poland
