= List of twin towns and sister cities in Denmark =

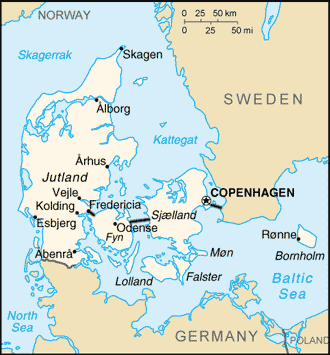
Map of Denmark

This is a list of municipalities of Denmark which have standing links to local communities in other countries known as "town twinning" (usually in Europe) or "sister cities" (usually in the rest of the world).

== A ==
Aabenraa

- Kaltenkirchen, Germany
- Lohja, Finland
- Ringerike, Norway
- Växjö, Sweden

Aalborg

- Almere, Netherlands
- Antibes, France
- Büdelsdorf, Germany
- Edinburgh, Scotland, United Kingdom
- Fredrikstad, Norway
- Fuglafjørður, Faroe Islands
- (Republic of Ireland) Galway, Ireland
- Gdynia, Poland
- Haifa, Israel
- Hefei, China
- Innsbruck, Austria
- Karlskoga, Sweden
- Lancaster, England, United Kingdom
- Lerum, Sweden
- Liperi, Finland
- Mykolaiv, Ukraine
- Norðurþing, Iceland
- Orsa, Sweden
- Orust, Sweden
- Ośno Lubuskie, Poland
- Racine, United States
- Rapperswil-Jona, Switzerland
- Rendalen, Norway
- Rendsburg, Germany
- Riga, Latvia
- Riihimäki, Finland
- Sermersooq, Greenland
- Solvang, United States
- Tulcea, Romania
- Tumakuru district, India
- Varna, Bulgaria
- Vilnius, Lithuania
- Wismar, Germany

Aarhus

- Bergen, Norway
- Gothenburg, Sweden
- Harbin, China
- Kiel, Germany
- Kujalleq, Greenland
- Rostock, Germany
- Turku, Finland

Albertslund

- Borken, Germany
- Dainville, France
- East Renfrewshire, Scotland, United Kingdom
- Grabow, Germany
- Říčany, Czech Republic
- Whitstable, England, United Kingdom

Assens

- Ljusdal, Sweden
- Oeversee, Germany

== B ==
Ballerup

- Brandenburg an der Havel, Germany
- East Kilbride, Scotland, United Kingdom

Billund

- Hohenwestedt, Germany

Brøndby

- Botkyrka, Sweden
- Dorogomilovo (Moscow), Russia
- Stange, Norway
- Steglitz-Zehlendorf (Berlin), Germany

Brønderslev

- Eidsberg, Norway
- Nässjö, Sweden

== C ==
Copenhagen

- Beijing, China
- Kyiv, Ukraine
- Marseille, France

== E ==
Esbjerg

- Ely, England, United Kingdom
- Eskilstuna, Sweden
- Fjarðabyggð, Iceland
- Güstrow, Germany
- Jyväskylä, Finland
- Krems an der Donau, Austria
- Qeqqata, Greenland
- Ratzeburg, Germany
- Stavanger, Norway
- Suzhou, China
- Szczecin, Poland
- Tórshavn, Faroe Islands

== F ==
Fredensborg

- Bad Berleburg, Germany
- Håbo, Sweden
- Ingå, Finland
- Nittedal, Norway
- Paide, Estonia
- Sudbury, England, United Kingdom

Fredericia

- Härnösand, Sweden
- Herford, Germany
- Ilulissat (Avannaata), Greenland
- Kokkola, Finland
- Kristiansund, Norway
- Šiauliai, Lithuania

Frederiksberg

- Bærum, Norway
- Hafnarfjörður, Iceland
- Hämeenlinna, Finland
- Qeqertarsuatsiaat, Greenland
- Tartu, Estonia
- Tórshavn, Faroe Islands
- Uppsala, Sweden

Frederikshavn

- Borlänge, Sweden
- Bremerhaven, Germany
- Larvik, Norway
- Qeqqata, Greenland
- Qingdao, China
- Tranås, Sweden

Frederikssund

- Aurskog-Høland, Norway
- Catoira, Spain
- Kumla, Sweden
- Ramsgate, England, United Kingdom
- Sipoo, Finland
- Somerset, England, United Kingdom

== G ==
Gentofte

- Halmstad, Sweden
- Hanko, Finland
- Sermersooq, Greenland
- Stord, Norway

Gladsaxe

- Charlottenburg-Wilmersdorf (Berlin), Germany
- Gagny, France
- Haabersti (Tallinn), Estonia
- Klagenfurt, Austria
- Koszalin, Poland
- Minden, Germany
- Narsaq, Greenland
- Neubrandenburg, Germany
- Paisley, Scotland, United Kingdom
- Pirkkala, Finland
- Ski, Norway
- Solna, Sweden
- Split, Croatia
- Sutton, England, United Kingdom
- Taitō (Tokyo), Japan
- Veszprém, Hungary

Glostrup

- Kotka, Finland
- Landskrona, Sweden

Guldborgsund

- Eutin, Germany
- Iisalmi, Finland
- Liepāja, Latvia
- Rostock, Germany

== H ==
Haderslev

- Braine, France
- Sandefjord, Norway
- Uusikaupunki, Finland
- Varberg, Sweden
- Wittenberg, Germany

Helsingør

- Harstad, Norway
- Sanremo, Italy
- Umeå, Sweden
- Uummannaq, Greenland
- Vaasa, Finland

Herlev

- Eberswalde, Germany
- Gniewkowo, Poland
- Höganäs, Sweden
- Lieto, Finland
- Nesodden, Norway
- Seltjarnarnes, Iceland

Herning

- Arsuk, Greenland
- Countryside, Åland Islands, Finland
- Eiði, Faroe Islands
- Holmestrand, Norway
- Husby, Germany
- Kangasala, Finland
- Siglufjörður, Iceland
- Vänersborg, Sweden

Hillerød

- Kladovo, Serbia

Høje-Taastrup

- Ängelholm, Sweden
- Oldenburg, Germany
- Valmiera, Latvia

Holstebro is a member of the Douzelage, a town twinning association of towns across the European Union. Holstebro also has one other twin town.

Douzelage

- Agros, Cyprus
- Altea, Spain
- Asikkala, Finland
- Bad Kötzting, Germany
- Bellagio, Italy
- (Republic of Ireland) Bundoran, Ireland
- Chojna, Poland
- Granville, France
- Houffalize, Belgium
- Judenburg, Austria
- Kőszeg, Hungary
- Marsaskala, Malta
- Meerssen, Netherlands
- Niederanven, Luxembourg
- Oxelösund, Sweden
- Preveza, Greece
- Rokiškis, Lithuania
- Rovinj, Croatia
- Sesimbra, Portugal
- Sherborne, England, United Kingdom
- Sigulda, Latvia
- Siret, Romania
- Škofja Loka, Slovenia
- Sušice, Czech Republic
- Tryavna, Bulgaria
- Türi, Estonia
- Zvolen, Slovakia

Other

- Brașov, Romania

Horsens

- Blönduós, Iceland
- Chengdu, China
- Karlstad, Sweden
- Moss, Norway
- Nokia, Finland

Hørsholm

- Leksand, Sweden
- Lillehammer, Norway
- Oulainen, Finland

Hvidovre

- Oppegård, Norway
- Rydułtowy, Poland
- Sollentuna, Sweden
- Tuusula, Finland

== I ==
Ishøj

- Bad Salzungen, Germany
- Cihanbeyli, Turkey
- Haninge, Sweden
- Svedala, Sweden
- Trzebinia, Poland
- Waalre, Netherlands

== J ==
Jammerbugt

- Lindesberg, Sweden
- Oppdal, Norway
- Strzelce Krajeńskie, Poland
- Tongzhou (Beijing), China
- Tornesch, Germany

== K ==
Kolding

- Anjō, Japan
- Delmenhorst, Germany
- Drammen, Norway
- Huéscar, Spain
- Kujalleq, Greenland
- Lappeenranta, Finland
- Örebro, Sweden
- Pisa, Italy
- Stykkishólmur, Iceland
- Szombathely, Hungary
- Wuqing (Tianjin), China

== L ==
Langeland

- Keuruu, Finland
- Skaun, Norway
- Tingsryd, Sweden

== M ==
Mariagerfjord

- Bábolna, Hungary
- Bolesławiec, Poland
- Kokemäki, Finland
- Lier, Norway
- Falköping, Sweden

Middelfart

- Barmstedt, Germany
- Korsholm, Finland
- Mandal, Norway
- Oskarshamn, Sweden

== N ==
Næstved is a member of the Charter of European Rural Communities, a town twinning association across the European Union. Næstved also has four other twin towns.

Charter of European Rural Communities

- Bienvenida, Spain
- Bièvre, Belgium
- Bucine, Italy
- (Republic of Ireland) Cashel, Ireland
- Cissé, France
- Desborough, England, United Kingdom
- Esch (Haaren), Netherlands
- Hepstedt, Germany
- Ibănești, Romania
- Kandava (Tukums), Latvia
- Kannus, Finland
- Kolindros, Greece
- Lassee, Austria
- Medzev, Slovakia
- Nagycenk, Hungary
- Nadur, Malta
- Ockelbo, Sweden
- Pano Lefkara, Cyprus
- Põlva, Estonia
- Samuel (Soure), Portugal
- Starý Poddvorov, Czech Republic
- Strzyżów, Poland
- Svoge, Bulgaria
- Tisno, Croatia
- Troisvierges, Luxembourg
- Žagarė (Joniškis), Lithuania

Other

- Gävle, Sweden
- Gjøvik, Norway
- Rauma, Finland
- Sopot, Poland

Nordfyn

- Naantali, Finland
- Svelvik, Norway
- Vadstena, Sweden

== O ==
Odder

- Katrineholm, Sweden
- Salo, Finland
- Vennesla, Norway

Odense

- Columbus, United States
- Funabashi, Japan
- Groningen, Netherlands
- Iksan, South Korea
- İzmir, Turkey
- Kaunas, Lithuania
- Kyiv, Ukraine
- Klaksvík, Faroe Islands
- Kópavogur, Iceland
- Norrköping, Sweden
- Östersund, Sweden
- Schwerin, Germany
- Shaoxing, China
- St Albans, England, United Kingdom
- Tampere, Finland
- Trondheim, Norway
- Upernavik (Avannaata), Greenland

== R ==
Randers

- Akureyri, Iceland
- Ålesund, Norway
- Jelenia Góra, Poland
- Lahti, Finland
- Västerås, Sweden

Rebild

- Gelenau, Germany
- Jiaxing, China

Ringsted

- Gyöngyös, Hungary
- Halden, Norway
- Kutná Hora, Czech Republic
- Ringsted, United States
- Sastamala, Finland
- Skövde, Sweden

Roskilde terminated all its twinnings.

Rudersdal

- Asker, Norway
- Eslöv, Sweden
- Garðabær, Iceland
- Jakobstad, Finland

== S ==
Silkeborg terminated all its twinnings.

Skanderborg

- Eisenach, Germany

Skive

- Arvika, Sweden
- Kongsvinger, Norway
- Qasigiannguit (Qeqertalik), Greenland
- Ylöjärvi, Finland

Slagelse

- Dargun, Germany
- Kragerø, Norway
- Vihti, Finland
- Wenzhou, China

Sorø

- Eidsvoll, Norway
- Fljótsdalshérað, Iceland
- Pruszcz, Poland
- Skara, Sweden

Stevns

- Höör, Sweden
- Laukaa, Finland
- Modum, Norway
- Östra Göinge, Sweden

Struer

- Forssa, Finland
- Sarpsborg, Norway
- Södertälje, Sweden

Svendborg

- Aasiaat (Qeqertalik), Greenland
- Bodø, Norway
- Dolný Kubín, Slovakia
- Jönköping, Sweden
- Kuopio, Finland
- Stralsund, Germany

== T ==
Tårnby

- Alingsås, Sweden
- Lillestrøm, Norway

Thisted

- Baja, Hungary
- Jõhvi, Estonia
- Loimaa, Finland
- Mosfellsbær, Iceland
- Uddevalla, Sweden
- Skien, Norway

== V ==
Vejle

- Borås, Sweden
- Jelgava, Latvia
- Mikkeli, Finland
- Molde, Norway
- Schleswig, Germany

Vesthimmerlands

- Lapinlahti, Finland
- Rana, Norway
- Sigulda, Latvia
- Skellefteå, Sweden

Viborg

- Dalvíkurbyggð, Iceland
- Hamar, Norway
- Lund, Sweden
- Lüneburg, Germany
- Marijampolė, Lithuania
- Porvoo, Finland
