= List of twin towns and sister cities in the Netherlands =

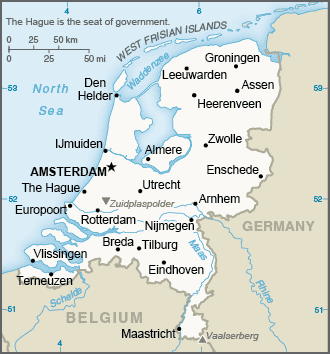
Map of the Netherlands

This is a list of municipalities in the Netherlands which have standing links to local communities in other countries. In most cases, the association, especially when formalised by local government, is known as "town twinning" (usually in Europe) or "sister cities" (usually in the rest of the world).

== A ==
Alkmaar

- Bath, England, United Kingdom
- Bergama, Turkey
- Darmstadt, Germany
- Tata, Hungary
- Troyes, France

Almelo

- Denizli, Turkey
- Iserlohn, Germany
- Preston, England, United Kingdom

Almere

- Aalborg, Denmark
- Rendsburg, Germany
- Shenzhen, China
- Växjö, Sweden

Alphen aan den Rijn

- Oudtshoorn, South Africa

Ameland

- Kleve, Germany

Amersfoort terminated all its twinnings.

Amstelveen

- Tempelhof-Schöneberg (Berlin), Germany
- Villa El Salvador, Peru

Apeldoorn

- Burlington, Canada
- Charlottenburg-Wilmersdorf (Berlin), Germany
- Gagny, France

Appingedam

- Aurich, Germany

Arnhem

- Coventry, England, United Kingdom
- Croydon, England, United Kingdom
- Gera, Germany
- Hradec Králové, Czech Republic
- Kimberley, South Africa
- Villa El Salvador, Peru

Assen

- Poznań, Poland

== B ==
Baarn terminated all its twinnings.

Barendrecht

- Louny, Czech Republic

Beek

- Gundelfingen an der Donau, Germany

Beemster

- Studená, Czech Republic

Bergen op Zoom

- Oudenaarde, Belgium
- Szczecinek, Poland

Beuningen

- Mikołów, Poland

Beverwijk

- Wronki, Poland

Borne

- Rheine, Germany

Breda

- Diest, Belgium
- Dillenburg, Germany
- Orange, France
- Wrocław, Poland
- Yangzhou, China

Brielle

- Havlíčkův Brod, Czech Republic

Brunssum

- Alsdorf, Germany

Buren

- Kinderhook, United States

== C ==
Coevorden

- Brest, Belarus
- Nordhorn, Germany

== D ==
De Bilt

- Coesfeld, Germany
- Mieścisko, Poland

De Fryske Marren

- Drolshagen, Germany
- Mediaș, Romania

Delft

- Estelí, Nicaragua
- Freiberg, Germany
- Kfar Saba, Israel

Delfzijl

- Shūnan, Japan

Den Helder

- Lüdenscheid, Germany

Deventer

- Arnsberg, Germany
- Sibiu, Romania
- Tartu, Estonia

Doetinchem

- La Libertad, Nicaragua
- Pardubice, Czech Republic
- Raesfeld, Germany

Dordrecht

- Bamenda, Cameroon
- Dordrecht, South Africa
- Hastings, England, United Kingdom
- Recklinghausen, Germany
- Varna, Bulgaria

Duiven

- Gemünden am Main, Germany

== E ==
Eijsden-Margraten

- Clervaux, Luxembourg

Eindhoven

- Bayeux, France
- Białystok, Poland
- Chinandega, Nicaragua
- Kadoma, Japan
- Minsk, Belarus
- Nanjing, China

Emmen

- Georgsmarienhütte, Germany
- Shangluo, China

Enschede

- Dalian, China
- Münster, Germany
- Palo Alto, United States

Etten-Leur

- Šiauliai, Lithuania

== G ==
Gennep

- San Pedro de Lóvago, Nicaragua

Goirle

- Krasnogorsk, Russia

Gooise Meren

- Valašské Meziříčí, Czech Republic

Gorinchem

- Gangjin, South Korea
- Sint-Niklaas, Belgium

Gouda

- Kongsberg, Norway
- Solingen, Germany

Groningen

- Graz, Austria
- Kaliningrad, Russia
- Katowice, Poland
- Murmansk, Russia
- Newcastle upon Tyne, England, United Kingdom
- Odense, Denmark
- Oldenburg, Germany
- San Carlos, Nicaragua
- Tallinn, Estonia
- Tianjin, China
- Xi'an, China
- Zlín, Czech Republic

== H ==
Haaksbergen

- Nagykőrös, Hungary

Haaren

- Pobiedziska, Poland

Haaren – Esch is a member of the Charter of European Rural Communities, a town twinning association across the European Union, along with:

- Bienvenida, Spain
- Bièvre, Belgium
- Bucine, Italy
- (Republic of Ireland) Cashel, Ireland
- Cissé, France
- Desborough, England, United Kingdom
- Hepstedt, Germany
- Ibănești, Romania
- Kandava (Tukums), Latvia
- Kannus, Finland
- Kolindros, Greece
- Lassee, Austria
- Medzev, Slovakia
- Næstved, Denmark
- Nagycenk, Hungary
- Nadur, Malta
- Ockelbo, Sweden
- Pano Lefkara, Cyprus
- Põlva, Estonia
- Samuel (Soure), Portugal
- Starý Poddvorov, Czech Republic
- Strzyżów, Poland
- Svoge, Bulgaria
- Tisno, Croatia
- Troisvierges, Luxembourg
- Žagarė (Joniškis), Lithuania

Haarlem

- Angers, France
- Harlem (New York), United States
- Osnabrück, Germany

Haarlemmermeer

- Cebu City, Philippines

Hattem

- Püspökladány, Hungary

Heemstede

- Royal Leamington Spa, England, United Kingdom

Heerhugowaard

- Goyang, South Korea
- Kalisz, Poland

Hellendoorn

- Ibbenbüren, Germany

Helmond

- Mechelen, Belgium
- San Marcos, Nicaragua
- Zielona Góra, Poland

Hengelo

- Emsdetten, Germany

's-Hertogenbosch

- Leuven, Belgium
- Trier, Germany

Hof van Twente

- Keszthely, Hungary

Hoogeveen

- Martin, Slovakia

Hoorn

- Malacca City, Malaysia
- Příbram, Czech Republic

Hulst

- Michelstadt, Germany

== I ==
IJsselstein

- Herentals, Belgium

== K ==
Kampen

- Eilat, Israel
- Meinerzhagen, Germany
- Pápa, Hungary
- Soest, Germany

Kapelle

- Orry-la-Ville, France

Katwijk

- Siegen, Germany

Koggenland

- Oberursel, Germany

Krimpen aan den IJssel

- Kiskőrös, Hungary
- Kościan, Poland

== L ==
Landgraaf

- Andrychów, Poland
- Übach-Palenberg, Germany

Landsmeer

- Bergneustadt, Germany
- Châtenay-Malabry, France

Leiden

- Buffalo City, South Africa
- Juigalpa, Nicaragua
- Krefeld, Germany
- Nagasaki, Japan
- Oxford, England, United Kingdom
- Toruń, Poland

Leidschendam-Voorburg

- Hranice, Czech Republic

Leusden terminated all its twinnings.

Lisse

- Tonami, Japan

Lopik

- Grebenstein, Germany
- Lezoux, France
- Sarsina, Italy

== M ==
Maassluis

- Berehove, Ukraine
- Hatvan, Hungary
- Târgu Secuiesc, Romania

Maastricht

- Chengdu, China
- El Rama, Nicaragua

Meerssen is a member of the Douzelage, a town twinning association of towns across the European Union, alongside with:

- Agros, Cyprus
- Altea, Spain
- Asikkala, Finland
- Bad Kötzting, Germany
- Bellagio, Italy
- (Republic of Ireland) Bundoran, Ireland
- Chojna, Poland
- Granville, France
- Holstebro, Denmark
- Houffalize, Belgium
- Judenburg, Austria
- Kőszeg, Hungary
- Marsaskala, Malta
- Niederanven, Luxembourg
- Oxelösund, Sweden
- Preveza, Greece
- Rokiškis, Lithuania
- Rovinj, Croatia
- Sesimbra, Portugal
- Sherborne, England, United Kingdom
- Sigulda, Latvia
- Siret, Romania
- Škofja Loka, Slovenia
- Sušice, Czech Republic
- Tryavna, Bulgaria
- Türi, Estonia
- Zvolen, Slovakia

Meppel

- Most, Czech Republic

Middelburg

- Vilvoorde, Belgium

Mook en Middelaar

- Přibyslav, Czech Republic

== N ==
Nieuwegein

- Rundu, Namibia

Nijkerk

- Schenectady, United States

Nijmegen

- Albany, United States
- Masaya, Nicaragua
- Pskov, Russia
- Suzhou, China

Nissewaard

- Hürth, Germany
- Thetford, England, United Kingdom

Noordenveld

- Litomyšl, Czech Republic
- Sögel, Germany
- Tarnowo Podgórne, Poland

== O ==
Oirschot

- Damasławek, Poland
- Westerlo, Belgium

Oldenzaal

- Rheda-Wiedenbrück, Germany

Opsterland

- Beit Sahour, Palestine
- Ra'anana, Israel

== R ==
Renkum

- Dębno, Poland

Rijssen-Holten

- Steinfurt, Germany
- Winterberg, Germany

Roermond

- Mönchengladbach, Germany
- Nepomuk, Czech Republic

Rotterdam

- Baltimore, United States
- Burgas, Bulgaria
- Cologne, Germany
- Constanța, Romania
- Esch-sur-Alzette, Luxembourg
- Gdańsk, Poland
- Havana, Cuba
- Lille, France
- Liège, Belgium
- Shanghai, China
- Saint Petersburg, Russia
- Turin, Italy

== S ==
Schiedam

- Esslingen am Neckar, Germany
- Neath Port Talbot, Wales, United Kingdom
- Udine, Italy
- Velenje, Slovenia
- Vienne, France

Sliedrecht

- Orăștie, Romania

Sittard-Geleen

- Böblingen, Germany
- Nauheim, Germany
- Pontoise, France

Smallingerland

- Gobabis, Namibia

Soest

- Soest, Germany

Stadskanaal

- Lilienthal, Germany

== T ==
Tholen

- Iława, Poland

Tilburg

- Changzhou, China
- Lublin, Poland
- Matagalpa, Nicaragua
- Minamiashigara, Japan
- Same, Tanzania

== U ==
Uden

- Lippstadt, Germany

Utrecht terminated all its twinnings.

== V ==
Veenendaal

- Olomouc, Czech Republic

Venlo

- Krefeld, Germany

Vijfheerenlanden

- Pfinztal, Germany

Vlaardingen

- Moravská Třebová, Czech Republic

Vlissingen

- Ambon, Indonesia

== W ==
Waalwijk

- Unna, Germany

Wageningen

- Gödöllő, Hungary
- Mörfelden-Walldorf, Germany
- Ndiza, Rwanda
- Zhangzhou, China

Westerveld

- Polička, Czech Republic

Westerwolde

- Andrésy, France
- Haren, Germany
- Międzyrzecz, Poland
- Nowogród Bobrzański, Poland
- Rhede, Germany

Wijchen

- Stargard, Poland

Woerden

- Steinhagen, Germany

== Z ==
Zaanstad

- Anderlecht, Belgium
- Boulogne-Billancourt, France
- Hammersmith and Fulham, England, United Kingdom
- Neukölln (Berlin), Germany
- Zwickau, Germany

Zeist

- Berkane, Morocco
- Slavkov u Brna, Czech Republic
- Yamada, Japan

Zevenaar

- Mátészalka, Hungary
- Weilburg, Germany

Zundert

- Auvers-sur-Oise, France

Zutphen terminated all its twinnings.

Zwijndrecht

- Norderstedt, Germany

Zwolle

- Lünen, Germany
