= Kolindros =

Kolindros Κολινδρός
- Municipal unit
- Location within the regional unit

- Location within Greece
- Coordinates: 40°29′N 22°29′E
- Country: Greece
- Administrative region: Central Macedonia
- Regional unit: Pieria
- Municipality: Pydna-Kolindros

Area
  - Municipal unit: 124.639 km^{2} (48.123 sq mi)
  - Community: 47.856 km^{2} (18.477 sq mi)
- Elevation: 280 m (920 ft)

Population (2021)
  - Municipal unit: 2,914
  - Municipal unit density: 23.38/km^{2} (60.55/sq mi)
  - Community: 2,255
  - Community density: 47.12/km^{2} (122.0/sq mi)
- Time zone: UTC+2 (EET)
  - Summer (DST): UTC+3 (EEST)
- Vehicle registration: KN

Kolindros (Greek: Κολινδρός) is a town and a former municipality in Pieria regional unit, in Central Macedonia, Greece. Since the 2011 local government reform it has been part of the municipality Pydna-Kolindros, of which it is a municipal unit. The municipal unit has an area of 124.639 km^{2}, the community 47.856 km^{2}. In 2021, the municipal unit had a population of 2,914 residents. The community of Kolindros, consisting of the settlement of Kolindros and that of Paliampela, has a population of 2,255 residents.

== Notable people ==
- George Zorbas

== Twin towns – sister cities ==
Kolindros is a member of the Charter of European Rural Communities, a town twinning association across the European Union, alongside with:

- Bienvenida, Spain
- Bièvre, Belgium
- Bucine, Italy
- (Republic of Ireland) Cashel, Ireland
- Cissé, France
- Desborough, England, United Kingdom
- Esch (Haaren), Netherlands
- Hepstedt, Germany
- Ibănești, Romania
- Kandava (Tukums), Latvia
- Kannus, Finland
- Lassee, Austria
- Medzev, Slovakia
- Næstved, Denmark
- Nagycenk, Hungary
- Nadur, Malta
- Ockelbo, Sweden
- Pano Lefkara, Cyprus
- Põlva, Estonia
- Samuel (Soure), Portugal
- Starý Poddvorov, Czech Republic
- Strzyżów, Poland
- Svoge, Bulgaria
- Tisno, Croatia
- Troisvierges, Luxembourg
- Žagarė (Joniškis), Lithuania

== See also ==
- Costas Kilias
