= Žagarė =

- City
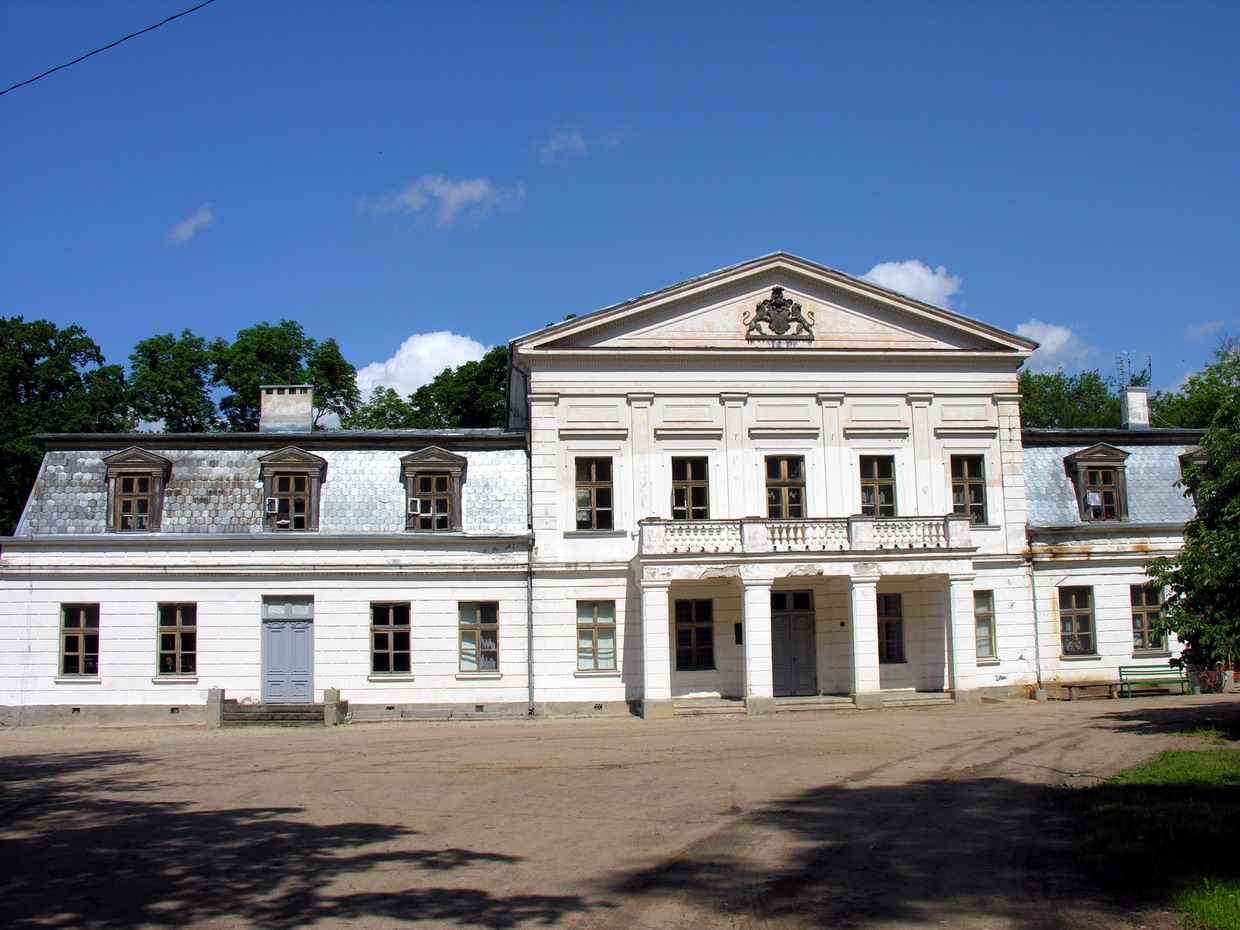
- Žagarė Manor

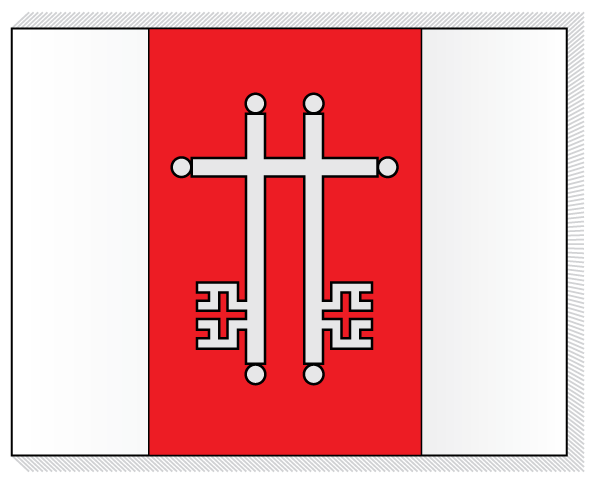
- Flag Coat of arms

- Location of Žagarė
- Coordinates: 56°22′0″N 23°15′0″E
- Country: Lithuania
- Ethnographic region: Semigallia
- County: Šiauliai County
- Municipality: Joniškis district municipality
- Eldership: Žagarė eldership
- Capital of: Žagarė eldership
- First mentioned: 1633
- Granted town rights: 1924

Population (2020)
  - Total: 1,309
- Time zone: UTC+2 (EET)
  - Summer (DST): UTC+3 (EEST)

Žagarė (see also other names) is a city located in the Joniškis district, northern Lithuania, close to the border with Latvia. It has a population of about 2,000, down from 14,000 in 1914, when it was the 7th largest city in Lithuania. Žagarė is famous for Žagarvyšnė - a cherry species originated in Žagarė.

== Etymology ==
Žagarė's name is probably derived from the Lithuanian word žagaras, meaning "twig". Other renderings of the name include: Latvian: Žagare, Polish: Żagory, Russian: Жагаре, romanized: Zhagare, Yiddish: זאַגער, romanized: Zager.

== History ==
The foundation of Žagarė dates back to the 12th century. A settlement of the Baltic tribe Semigallians Sagera was mentioned for the first time in March 1254 in the documents of the partitioning of the Semigallia. In 13th century it was a Semigalian fortress Raktuvė (or Raktė, first mentioned in 1272-1289 documents). It was an important centre of Semigallian warriors, who fought against the Livonian Brothers of the Sword and the Livonian Order. The cult of Barbora Žagarietė, servant of God, originated in the town in mid-1600s.

It long had a Jewish population that contributed to its culture. Yisroel Salanter (1810–1883), the father of the 19th-century Mussar movement in Orthodox Judaism, was born there. Isaak Kikoin (1908–1984), a renowned Soviet physicist, was also born there.

The Jewish quarter in Žagarė was among those damaged in 1881 as part of the violence against Jews that occurred during the pogroms in southern Russia.

During World War II, the town was under Soviet occupation from 1940, and then under German occupation from 1941 to 1944. On 22 August 1941, on the orders of Šiauliai Gebietskommissar Hans Gewecke, all half-Jews and Jews in the district were to be moved to Žagarė ghetto (around 500 people). The Jews were allowed only to take clothing and at most 200 Reichsmark. Many Jews were shot on the spot instead of being sent to the ghetto. In a massacre committed by Einsatzgruppe A on 2 October 1941, the date of Yom Kippur that year, all Jews were killed at the marketplace and buried in Naryshkin Park.

Today Žagarė is the administrative centre of the Žagarė Regional Park, known for its valuable urban and natural heritage. Once one of the largest cities in Lithuania (in the 1900s the number of town inhabitants exceeded 10 thousand), it preserved valuable urban complexes – trade square, side street network with early 20th century brick buildings, two churches, Žagarė manor with park, former early 20 c. cinema building and other valuable urban artefacts.

== Notable residents ==
- Marius Katiliškis, prominent Lithuanian exile novelist
- Juozas Žlabys-Žengė, Lithuanian poet
- Vaclovas Daunoras, prominent Lithuanian opera soloist.
- Louis Bookman, sportsman who played both football and cricket for Ireland
- Sidney Hillman
- Isaak Kikoin
- Phoebus Levene
- Caspar Levias
- Paul Mandelstamm
- Yisroel Salanter
- Kalonimus Wolf Wissotzky. Founder of Wissotzky Tea
- Barbora Žagarietė
- Sarah Millin, South African author

== Twin towns – sister cities ==
Žagarė is a member of the Charter of European Rural Communities, a town twinning association across the European Union, along with:

- Bienvenida, Spain
- Bièvre, Belgium
- Bucine, Italy
- (Republic of Ireland) Cashel, Ireland
- Cissé, France
- Desborough, England, United Kingdom
- Esch (Haaren), Netherlands
- Hepstedt, Germany
- Ibănești, Romania
- Kandava (Tukums), Latvia
- Kannus, Finland
- Kolindros, Greece
- Lassee, Austria
- Medzev, Slovakia
- Næstved, Denmark
- Nagycenk, Hungary
- Nadur, Malta
- Ockelbo, Sweden
- Pano Lefkara, Cyprus
- Põlva, Estonia
- Samuel (Soure), Portugal
- Starý Poddvorov, Czech Republic
- Strzyżów, Poland
- Svoge, Bulgaria
- Tisno, Croatia
- Troisvierges, Luxembourg
