= Starý Poddvorov =

- Municipality
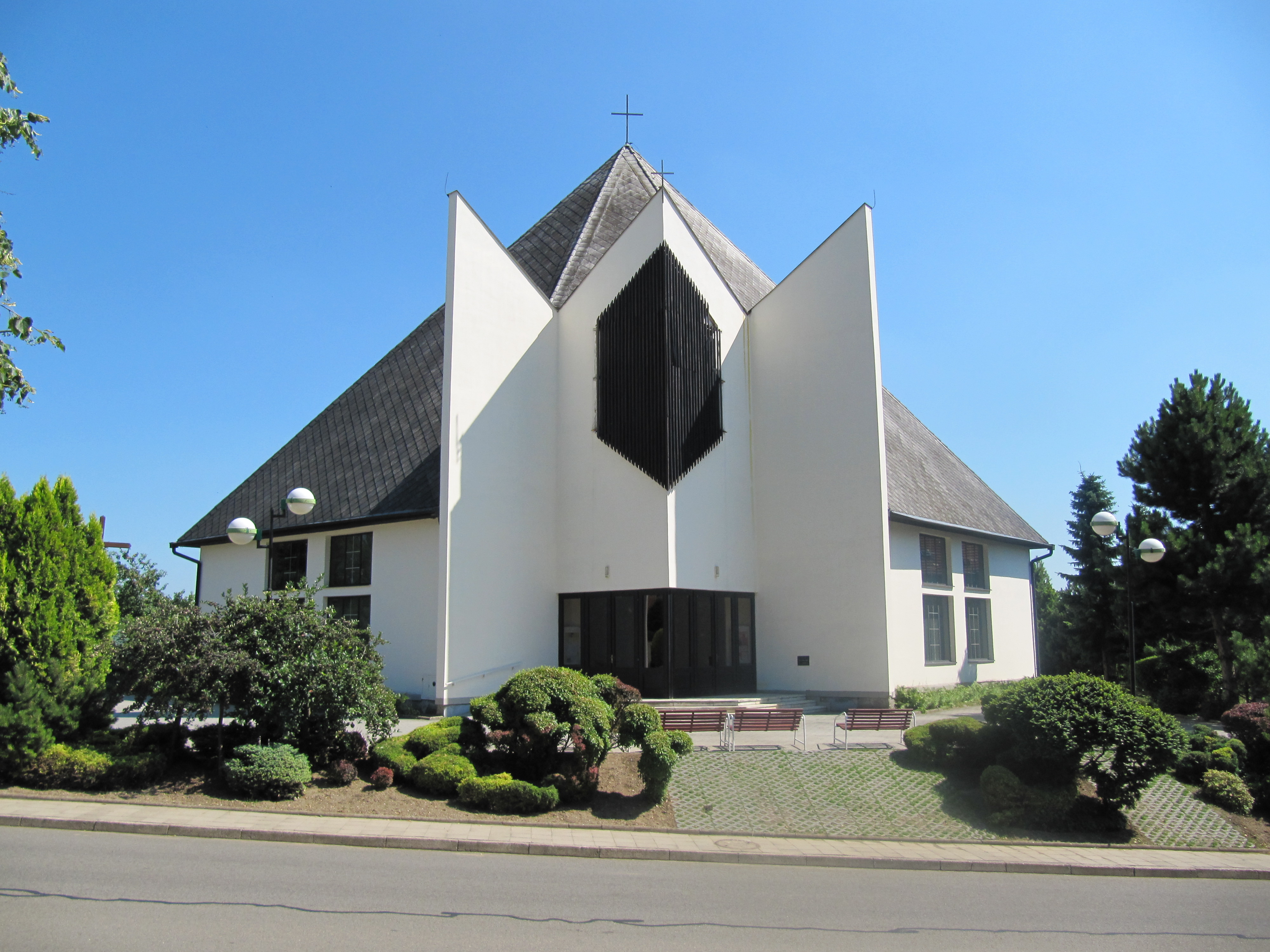
- Church of Saint Martin

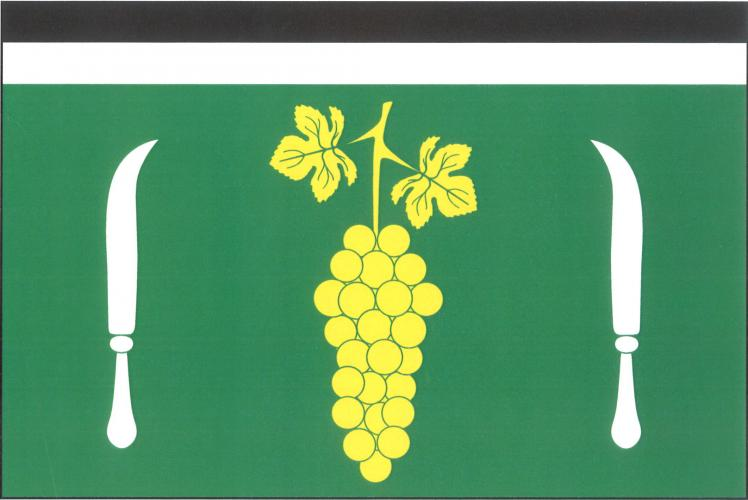
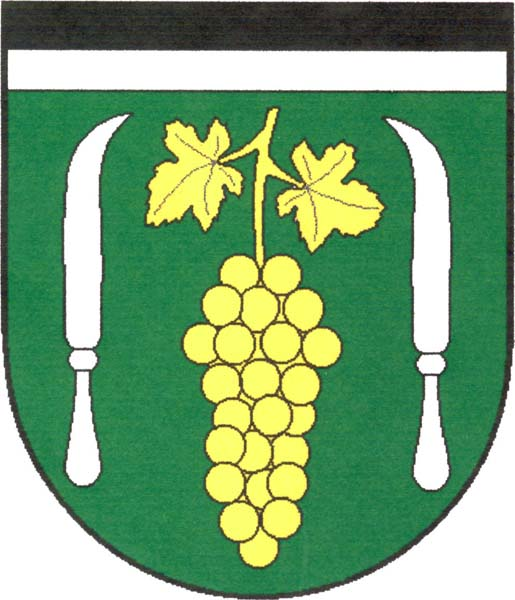
- Flag Coat of arms

- Location in the Czech Republic
- Coordinates: 48°52′29″N 16°59′17″E
- Country: Czech Republic
- Region: South Moravian
- District: Hodonín
- First mentioned: 1704

Area
  - Total: 5.46 km^{2} (2.11 sq mi)
- Elevation: 224 m (735 ft)

Population (2026-01-01)
  - Total: 921
  - Density: 169/km^{2} (437/sq mi)
- Time zone: UTC+1 (CET)
  - Summer (DST): UTC+2 (CEST)
- Postal code: 696 16
- Website: www.poddvorov.cz

Starý Poddvorov is a municipality and village in Hodonín District in the South Moravian Region of the Czech Republic. It has about 900 inhabitants.

== Geography ==
Starý Poddvorov is located about 9 kilometres (6 mi) west of Hodonín and 44 km (27 mi) southeast of Brno. It lies in the Kyjov Hills. The highest point is at 262 m (860 ft) above sea level.

== History ==
The first written mention of Starý Poddvorov is from 1704, when the local winemakers started to build houses here and received land in the area of the extinct village of Potvorov from the Jesuits. After the Jesuit Order was abolished in 1773, the village became a part of the Hodonín estate in 1783. Since 1867, it has been an independent municipality.

== Demographics ==
Historical population

| Year | Pop. | ±% |
|---|---|---|
| 1869 | 689 | — |
| 1880 | 719 | +4.4% |
| 1890 | 757 | +5.3% |
| 1900 | 835 | +10.3% |
| 1910 | 888 | +6.3% |

| Year | Pop. | ±% |
|---|---|---|
| 1921 | 928 | +4.5% |
| 1930 | 918 | −1.1% |
| 1950 | 942 | +2.6% |
| 1961 | 1,059 | +12.4% |
| 1970 | 1,057 | −0.2% |

| Year | Pop. | ±% |
|---|---|---|
| 1980 | 1,017 | −3.8% |
| 1991 | 887 | −12.8% |
| 2001 | 900 | +1.5% |
| 2011 | 943 | +4.8% |
| 2021 | 931 | −1.3% |

Source: Censuses

== Economy ==
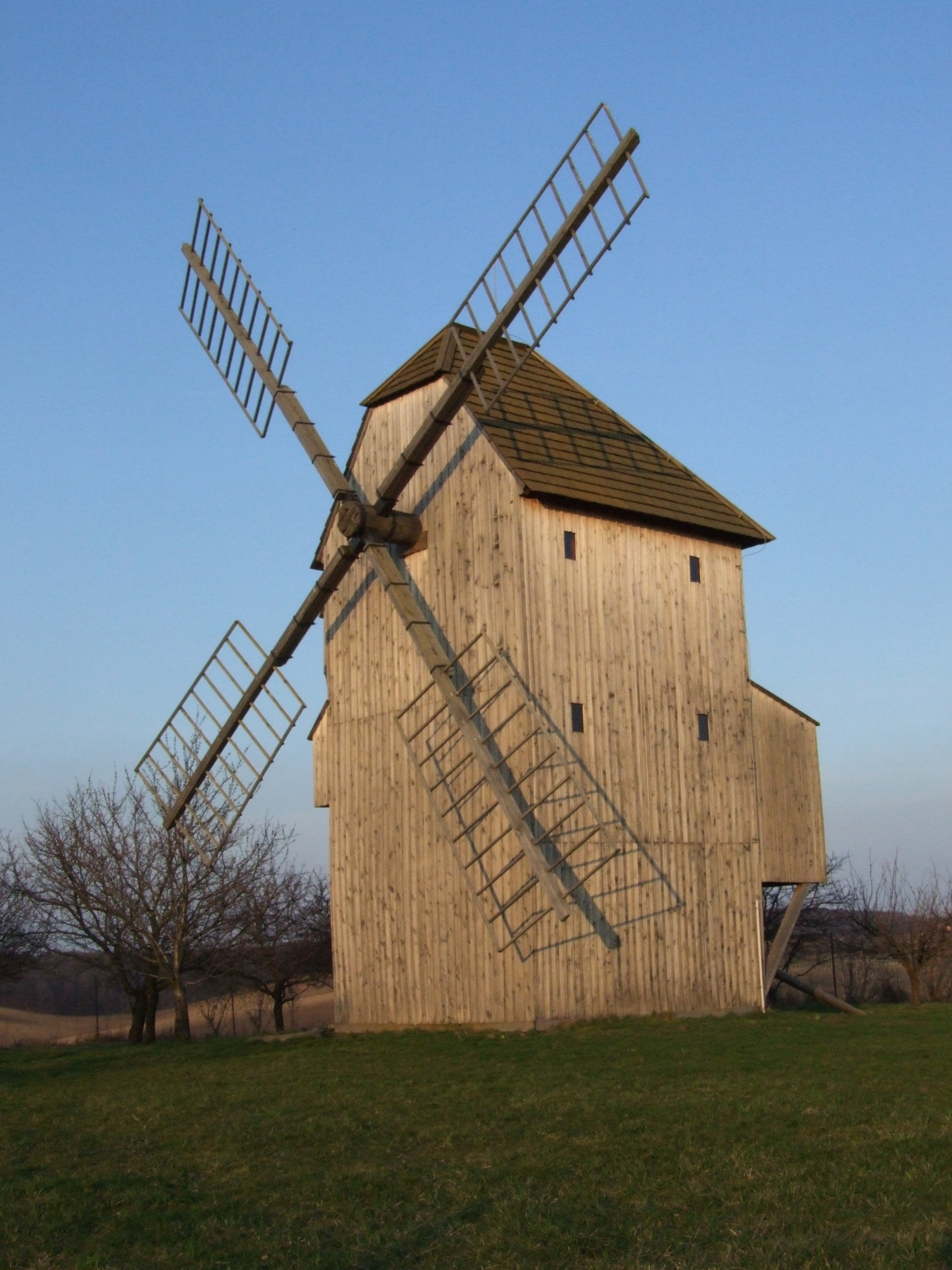
Windmill

Starý Poddvorov is known for viticulture and winemaking. The municipality lies in the Slovácká wine subregion.

== Transport ==
There are no railways or major roads passing through the municipality.

== Sights ==
The most important sight is the local wooden windmill. This technical monument was built in 1870.

The main landmark of Starý Poddvorov is the Church of Saint Martin. It is a modern church, built in 1994.

== Twin towns – sister cities ==
Starý Poddvorov is a member of the Charter of European Rural Communities, a town twinning association across the European Union and the United Kingdom, along with:

- Bienvenida, Spain
- Bièvre, Belgium
- Bucine, Italy
- (Republic of Ireland) Cashel, Ireland
- Cissé, France
- Desborough, England, United Kingdom
- Esch (Haaren), Netherlands
- Hepstedt, Germany
- Ibănești, Romania
- Kandava (Tukums), Latvia
- Kannus, Finland
- Kolindros, Greece
- Lassee, Austria
- Medzev, Slovakia
- Næstved, Denmark
- Nagycenk, Hungary
- Nadur, Malta
- Ockelbo, Sweden
- Pano Lefkara, Cyprus
- Põlva, Estonia
- Samuel (Soure), Portugal
- Strzyżów, Poland
- Svoge, Bulgaria
- Tisno, Croatia
- Troisvierges, Luxembourg
- Žagarė (Joniškis), Lithuania
