= Caspar Levias =

Caspar Levias (February 13, 1860 – February 18, 1934) was a Lithuanian-born Jewish-American Orientalist, lexicographer, and philologist.

== Life ==
Levias was born on February 13, 1860, in Žagarė, Russia, the son of Jacob Levias and Mary Kahn.

Levias immigrated to America in 1882. He became a naturalized American citizen in 1888, by which point he was living in New York City and working as a teacher. He began attending Columbia College in 1889, and in 1893 he graduated from there with a B.A. He later received an M.A. from there. He was fellow in Oriental languages at Columbia from 1893 to 1894, and fellow in Semitic languages at Johns Hopkins University in Baltimore, Maryland from 1894 to 1895. In 1895, he became an instructor at Hebrew Union College in Cincinnati, Ohio. He published "The Justification of Zionism" in 1899 and "A Grammar of the Aramaic Idiom Contained in the Babylonian Talmud" in 1900, along with a large number of philological essays in The American Journal of Semitic Languages and the Hebrew Union College Journal. He taught Semitic languages at Hebrew Union College.

Levias was on the Hebrew Union College faculty until 1905, when he left the College and turned to business. Finding little success in the field, he became associated with the Plaut Memorial School in Newark, New Jersey, from 1910 to 1920. He also lectured at the Jewish Teachers's Seminary in New York City. In 1930, he published Didduk Aramith Bablith in Hebrew. He also wrote about Galilean Aramaic grammar in Hebrew and Lexicon of Medical Terms in Hebrew Literature, neither of which were published before he died. Hundreds of his philological notes were published in the Hebrew quarterly Leshoneau. Two parts of his Dictionary of Hebrew Philological Terms were published from 1914 to 1915. His study "Who Were the Amorites?", which claimed the Amorites were the Amhars, was published in 1929. In 1891, he and other American Hebraists produced the first Hebrew and Yiddish versions of the United States Constitution and the Declaration of Independence. An ardent Zionist and Hebraist, he published much of his work in Hebrew. In 1911, he began editing and publishing the Hebrew literary journal Ha-Deror with Reuben Brainin and Israel Schapiro.

In 1901, Levias married Irene Schwarz in Vienna, Austria-Hungary.

Levias died at home on February 18, 1934. Rabbi Solomon Foster and Dr. Joshua Bloch officiated his funeral service in Newark.
