= Žagarė Manor =

Coordinates: 56°21′44″N 23°15′52″E

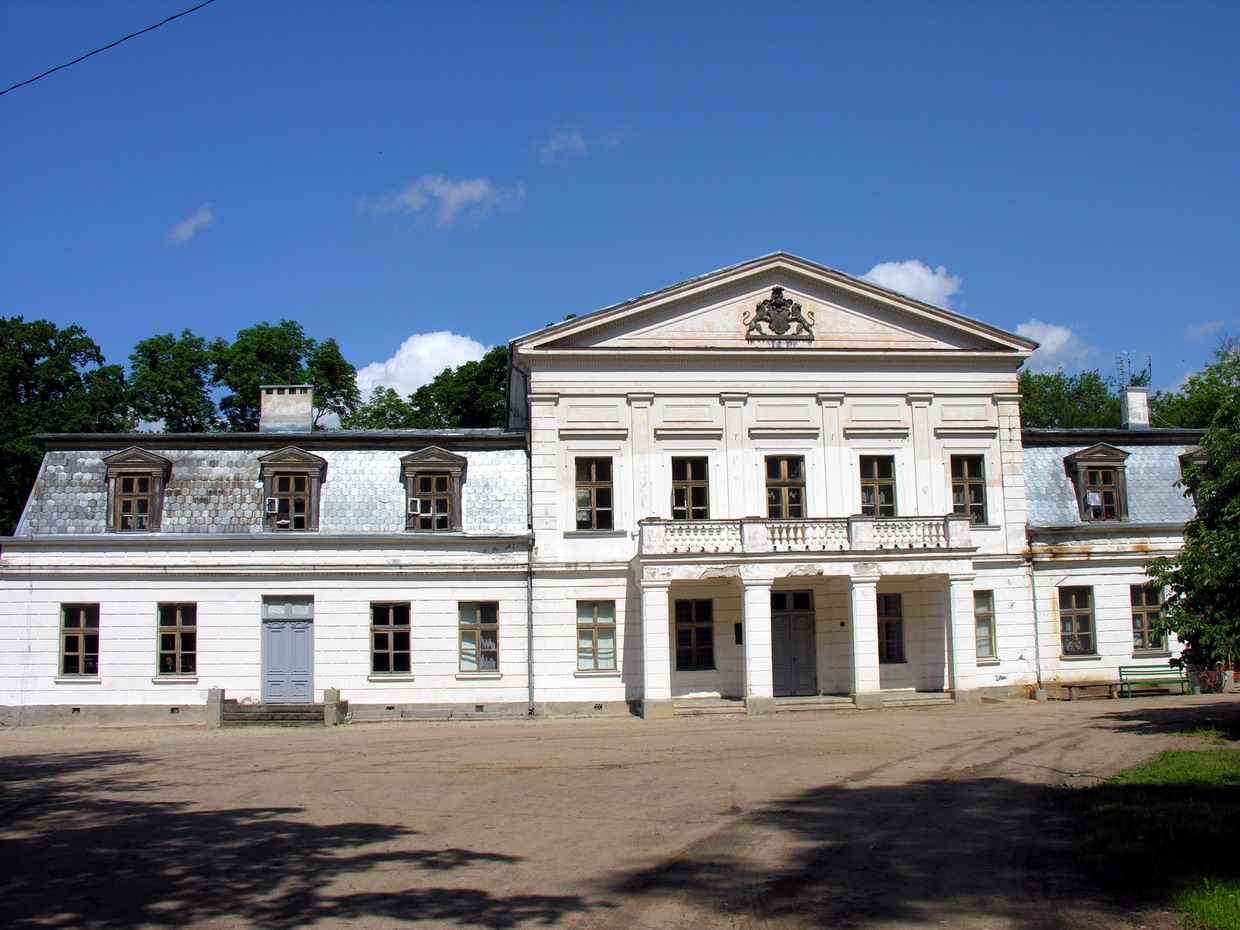
Žagarė Manor (2009)

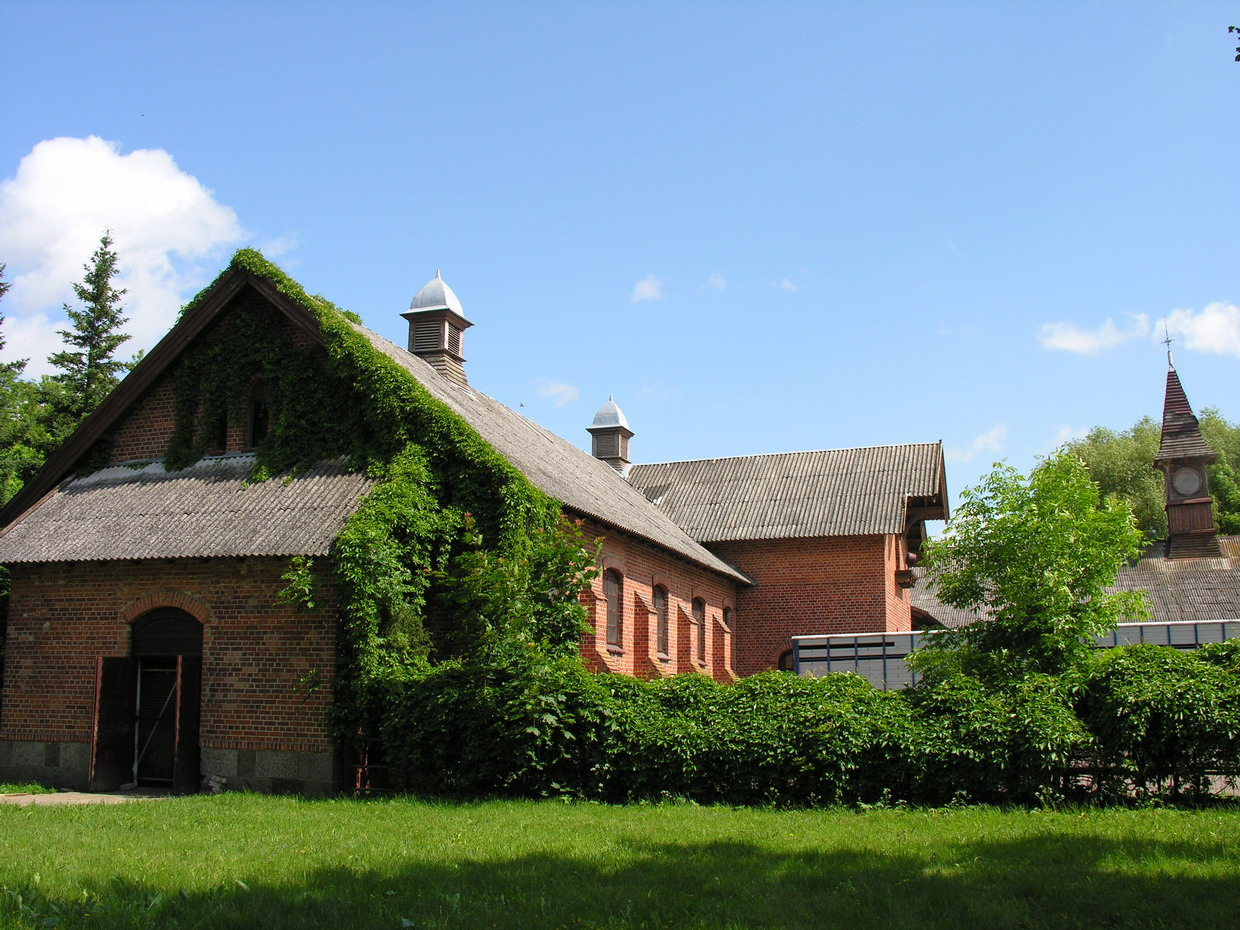
Žagarė Manor stables

Žagarė Manor is a former residence of Prince Platon Zubov in Žagarė, Joniškis district, in Lithuania. Manor reconstruction began in 2013.
