= Matkule parish =

Administrative unit in Latvia

- parish of Latvia
- Coat of arms

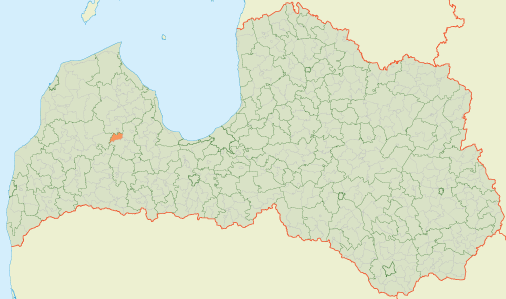
- Coordinates: 56°58′50″N 22°32′57″E
- Country: Latvia

Population (1 January 2026)
  - Total: 478

Matkule parish (Latvian: Matkules pagasts) is an administrative unit of Tukums Municipality in the Courland region of Latvia. From 2009 until 2021, it was part of the former Kandava Municipality.
