= Kandava Municipality =

Municipality of Latvia

Kandava Municipality Kandavas novads
- Municipality
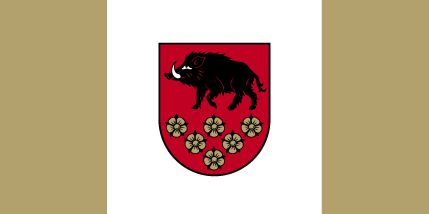
- Flag Coat of arms

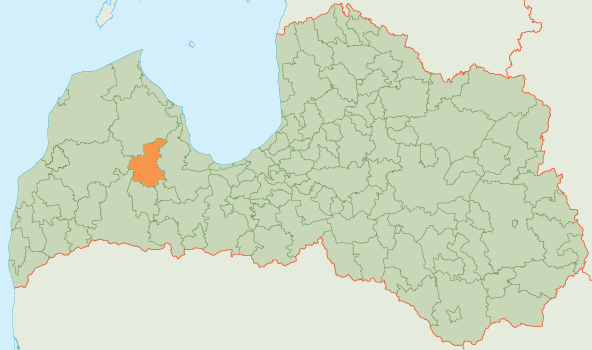
- Coordinates: 57°02′29″N 22°46′23″E
- Country: Latvia
- Formed: 1999
- Centre: Kandava

Government
  - Chairwoman: Inga Priede (LZP)

Area
  - Total: 649.02 km^{2} (250.59 sq mi)
  - Land: 636.45 km^{2} (245.73 sq mi)
  - Water: 12.57 km^{2} (4.85 sq mi)

Population (2021)
  - Total: 7,462
  - Density: 11.72/km^{2} (30.37/sq mi)
- Website: www.kandava.lv

Kandava Municipality (Latvian: Kandavas novads) is a former municipality in Courland, Latvia. The municipality was formed in 1999 by merging Cēre Parish and Kandava town with its countryside territory. Later it absorbed Matkule Parish, Vāne Parish, Zante Parish and Zemīte Parish the administrative centre being Kandava.

On 1 July 2021, Kandava Municipality ceased to exist and its territory was merged into Tukums Municipality.

== See also ==
- Administrative divisions of Latvia
