= Esch, Netherlands =

Esch
- Village
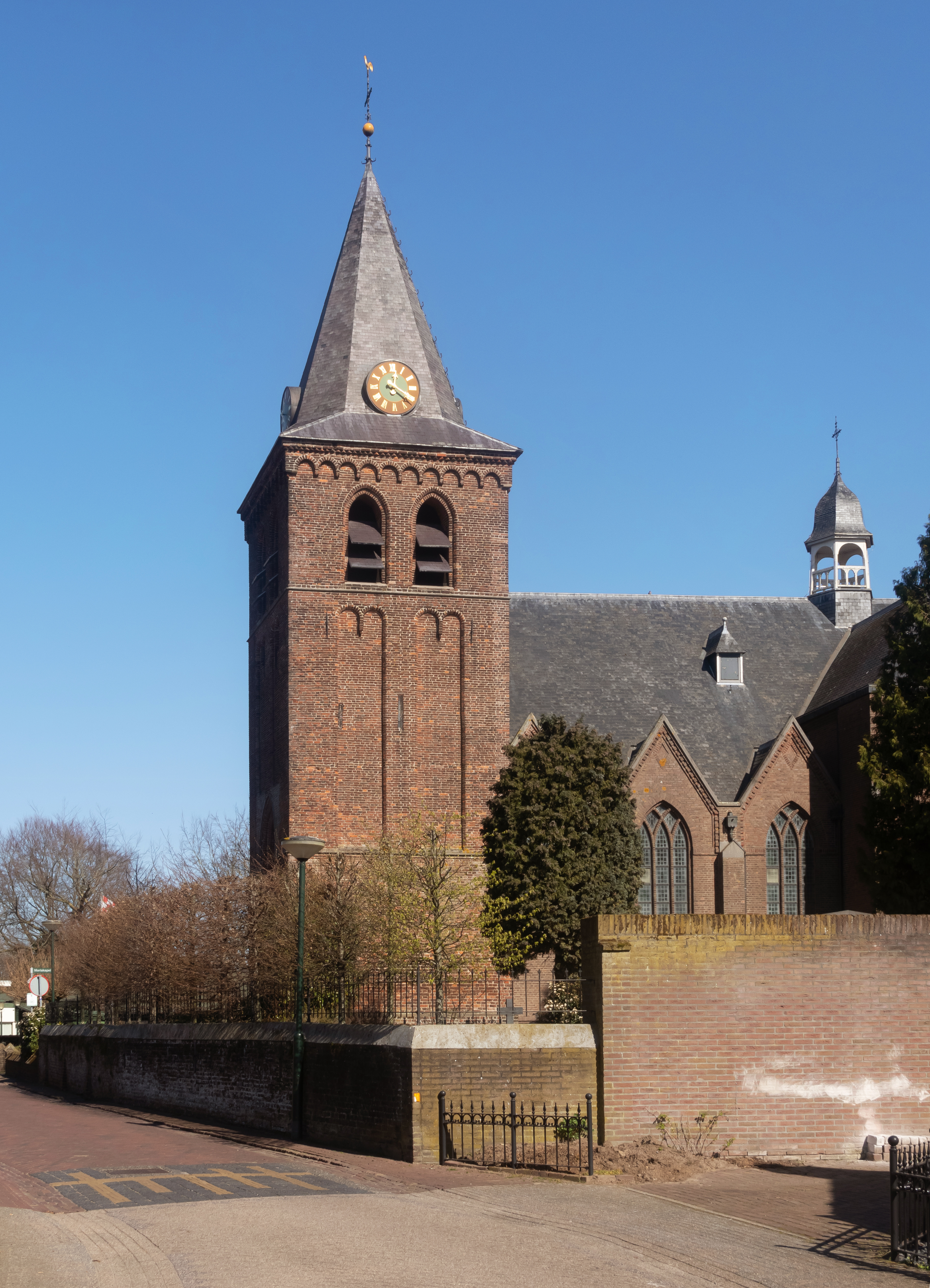
- Sint-Willibrorduskerk church

- Location in the province of North Brabant in the Netherlands Esch (Netherlands)
- Coordinates: 51°36′37″N 5°17′26″E
- Country: Netherlands
- Province: North Brabant
- Municipality: Boxtel

Area
  - Total: 5.47 km^{2} (2.11 sq mi)
- Elevation: 6 m (20 ft)

Population (2021)
  - Total: 2,145
  - Density: 392/km^{2} (1,020/sq mi)
- Time zone: UTC+1 (CET)
  - Summer (DST): UTC+2 (CEST)
- Postal code: 5296
- Dialing code: 0411

Esch (Dutch pronunciation: [ɛs]) is a village in the Dutch province of North Brabant. It is located in the municipality of Boxtel.

== History ==
The village was first mentioned in 773 or 774 as Hesc, and probably means "ash (Fraxinus excelsior) forest". Esch is a church village which developed in the Early Middle Ages along the Esschestroom. The Abbey of Echternach had possessions in Esch back in the 8th century.

The tower of the St Willibrordus Church dates from the late 15th century. The church was built in 1926 and 1927 in Byzantine Revival style. The convent Sancta Monica was built in 1895 by the missionary sisters Onze-Lieve-Vrouwe van Afrika (Our Lady of Africa). In 2012, the convent was converted into an apartment building.

Esch was home to 245 people in 1840. Esch was a separate municipality until 1996, when it was merged with Haaren.

== Gallery ==
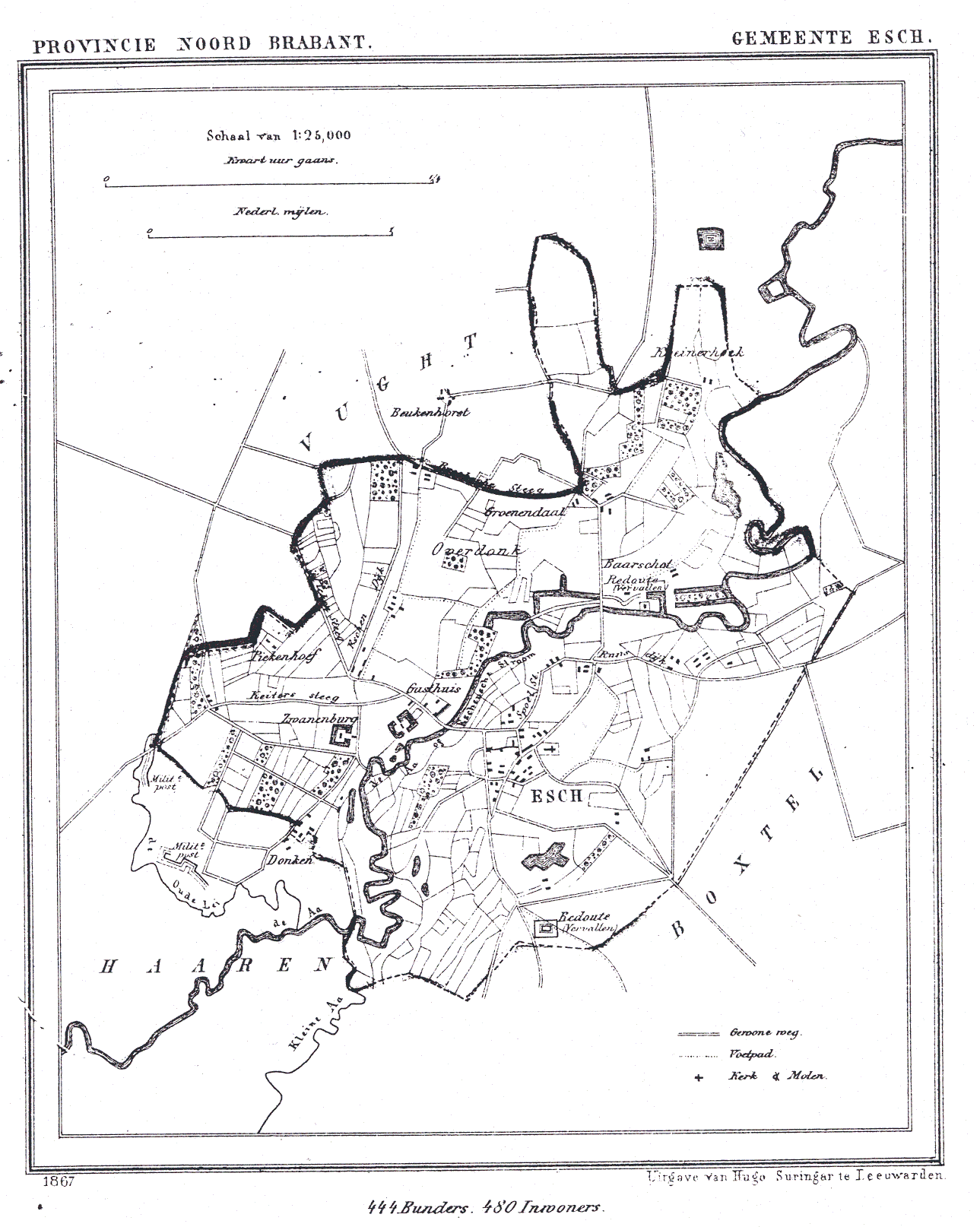
Map of 1867

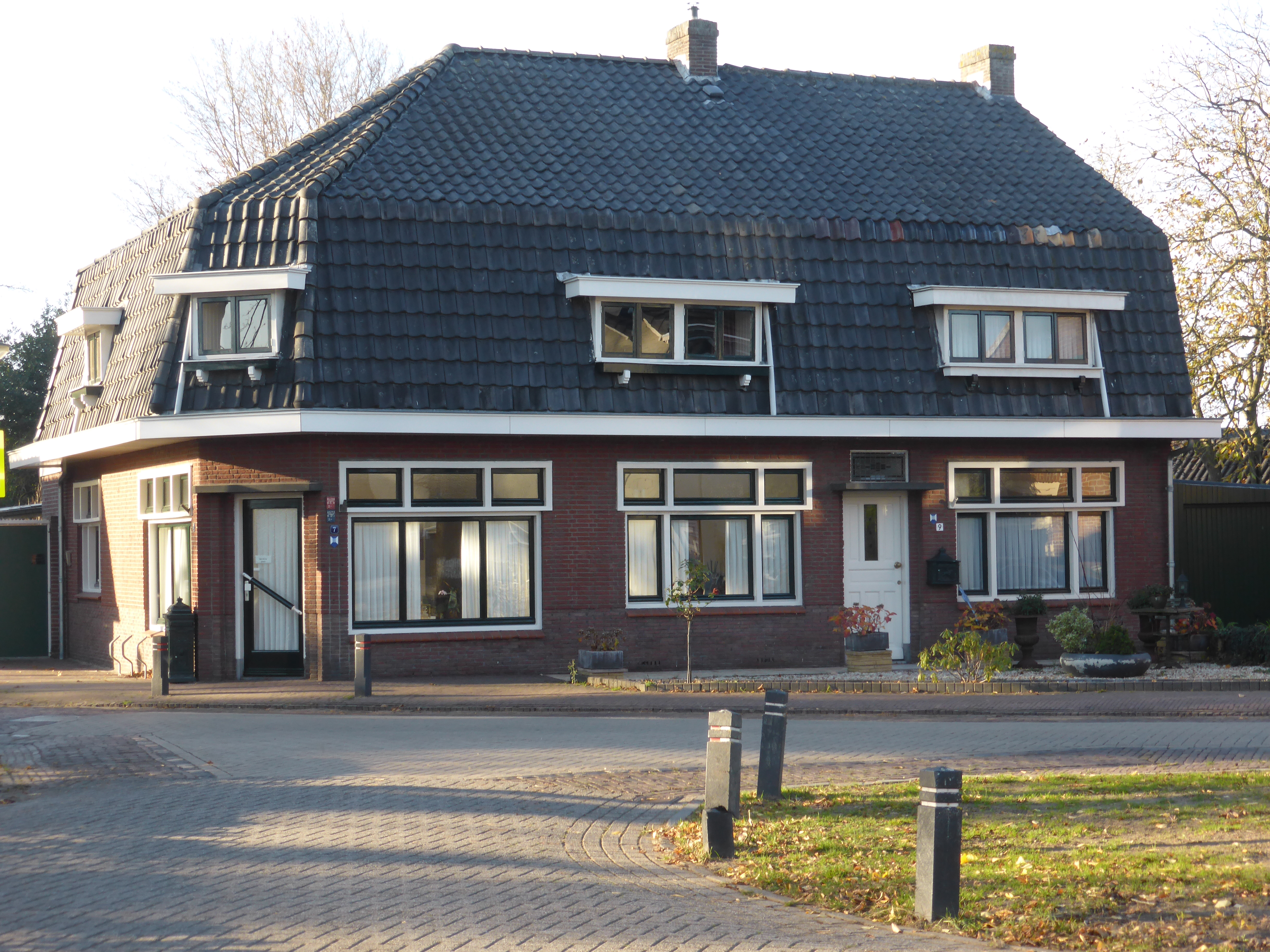
House in Esch

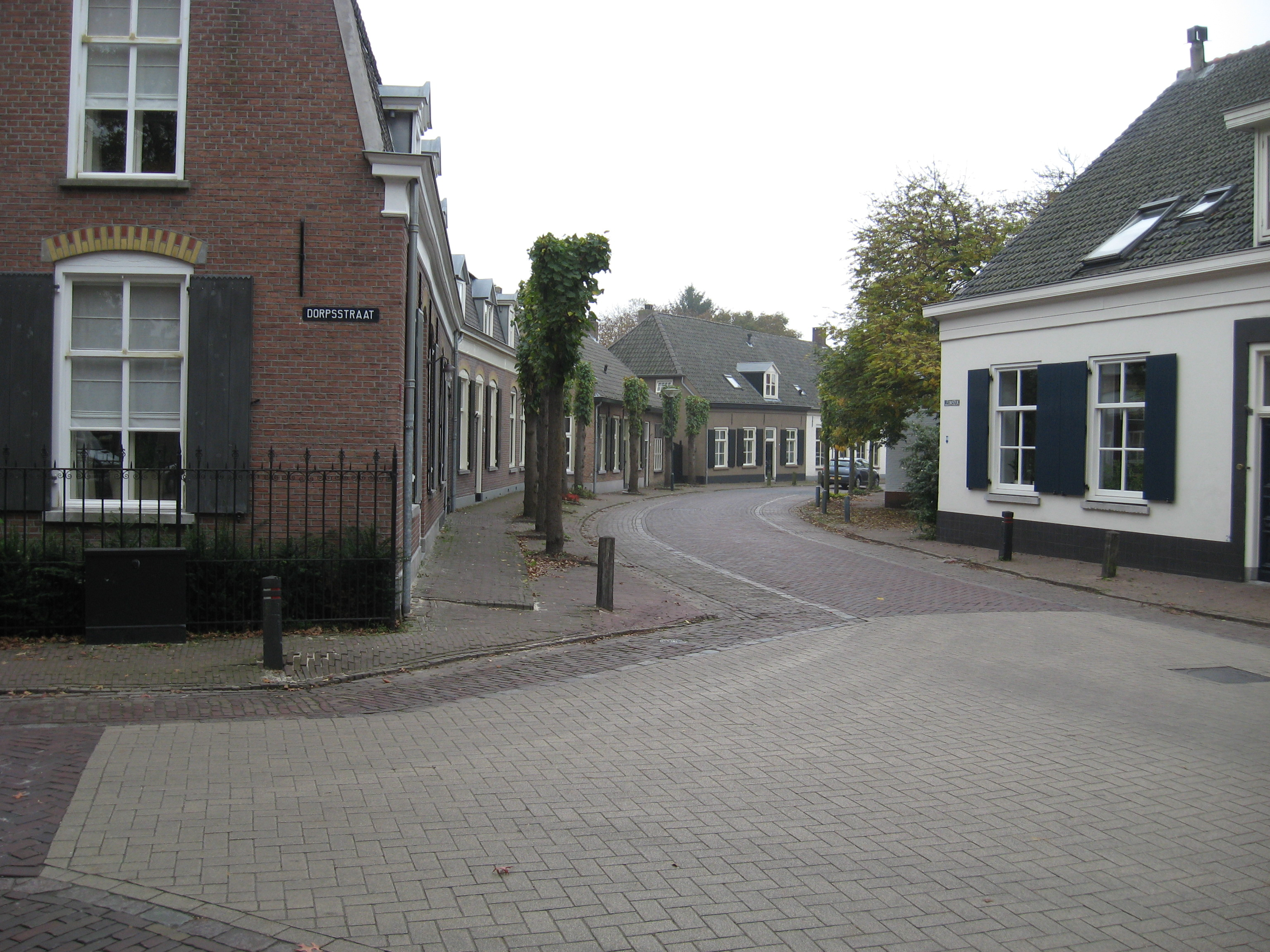
Street of Esch

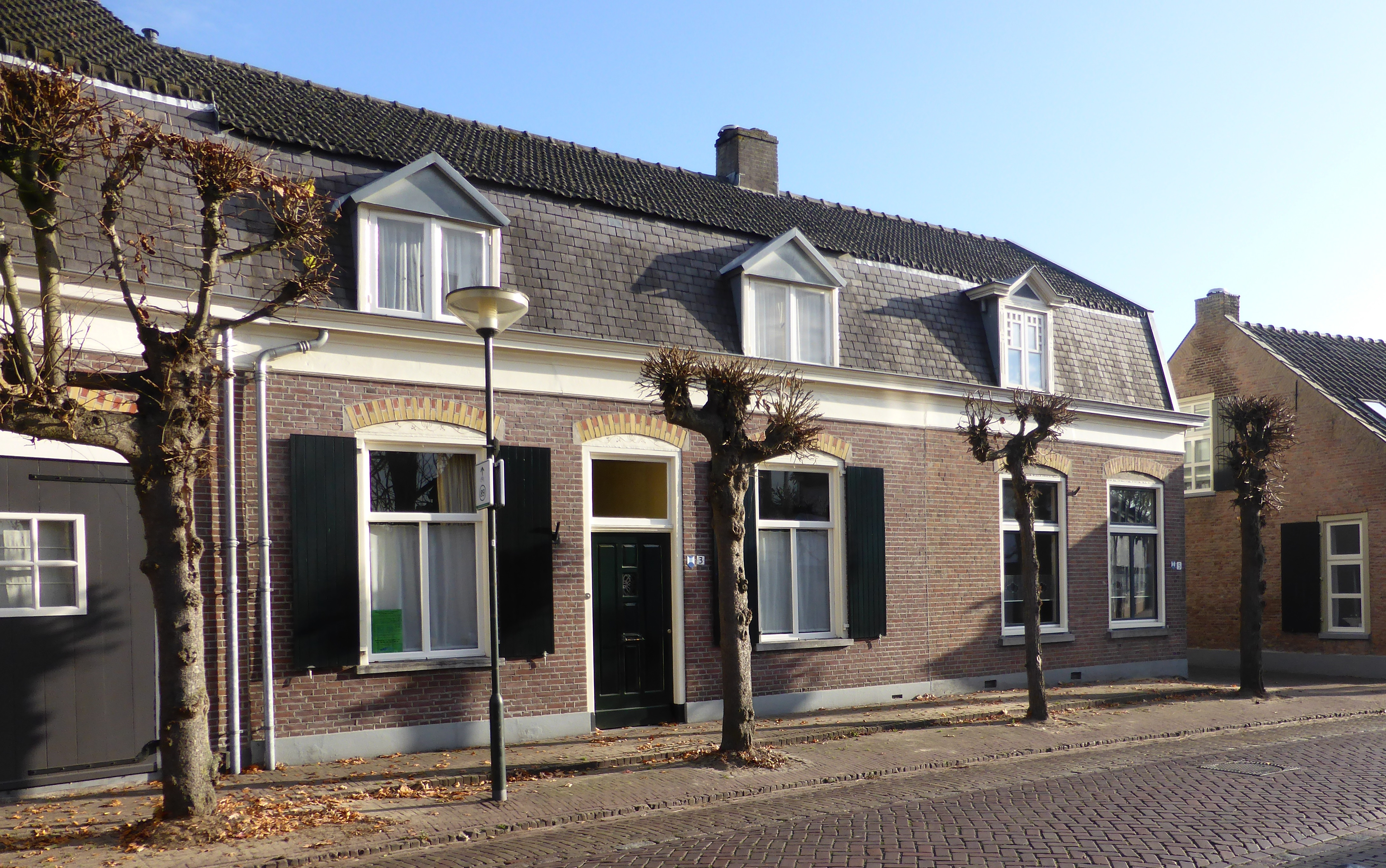
Houses in Esch
