= Lassee =

Place in Austria

- Municipality
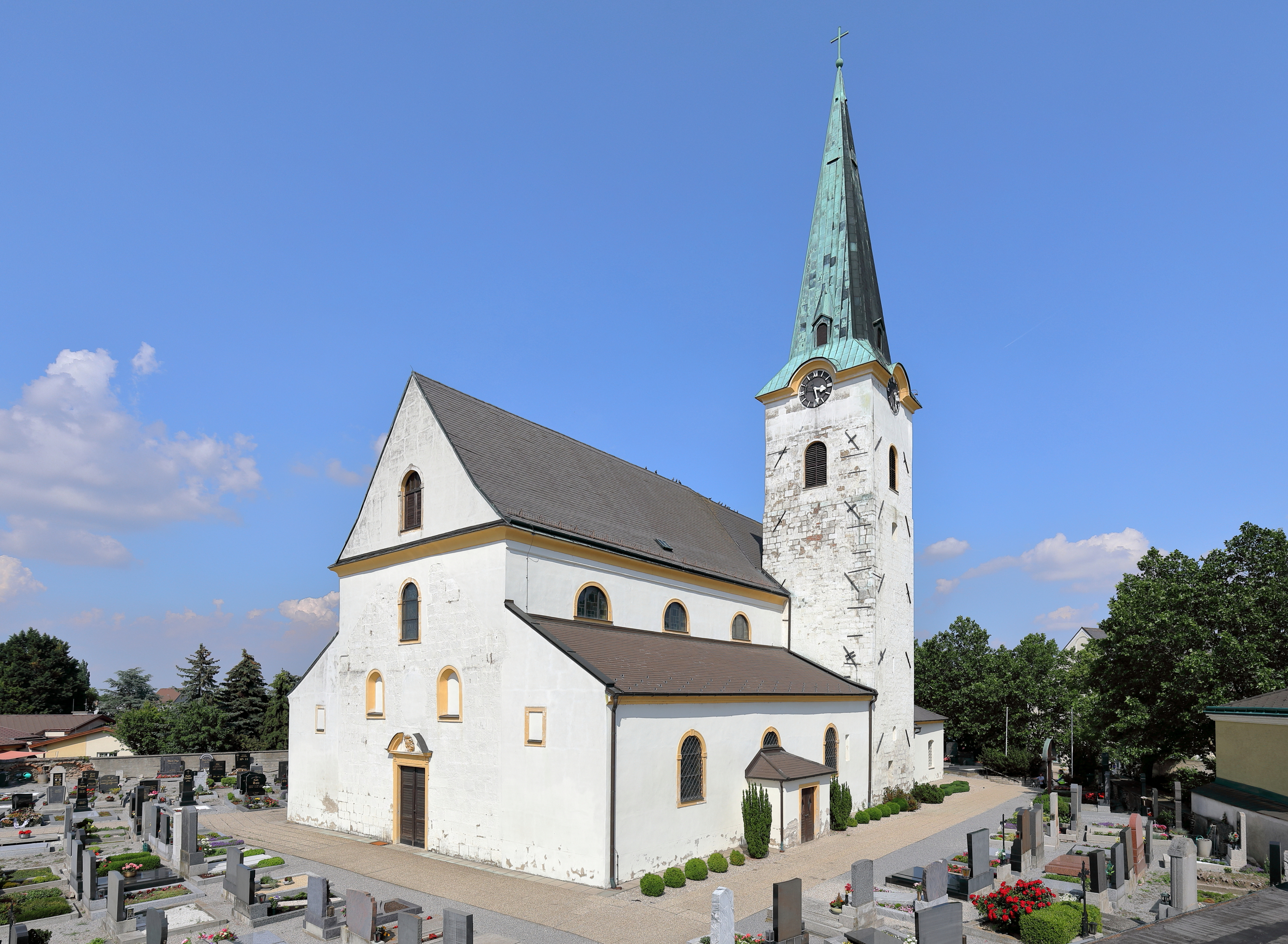
- Parish Church of Saint Martin

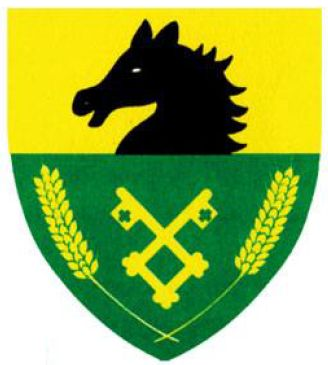
- Coat of arms

- Location within Austria
- Coordinates: 48°13′N 16°49′E
- Country: Austria
- State: Lower Austria
- District: Gänserndorf

Government
  - Mayor: Karl Grammanitsch (ÖVP)

Area
  - Total: 55.63 km^{2} (21.48 sq mi)
- Elevation: 148 m (486 ft)

Population (2018-01-01)
  - Total: 2,765
  - Density: 49.70/km^{2} (128.7/sq mi)
- Time zone: UTC+1 (CET)
  - Summer (DST): UTC+2 (CEST)
- Postal code: 2291
- Area code: 02213
- Website: www.lassee.at

Lassee is a town in the district of Gänserndorf in the Austrian state of Lower Austria.

== Population ==
Historical population
Year	Pop.	±%
1971	1,926	—
1981	1,784	−7.4%
1991	1,980	+11.0%
2001	2,354	+18.9%
2011	2,592	+10.1%
