= Bienvenida, Spain =

Bienvenida
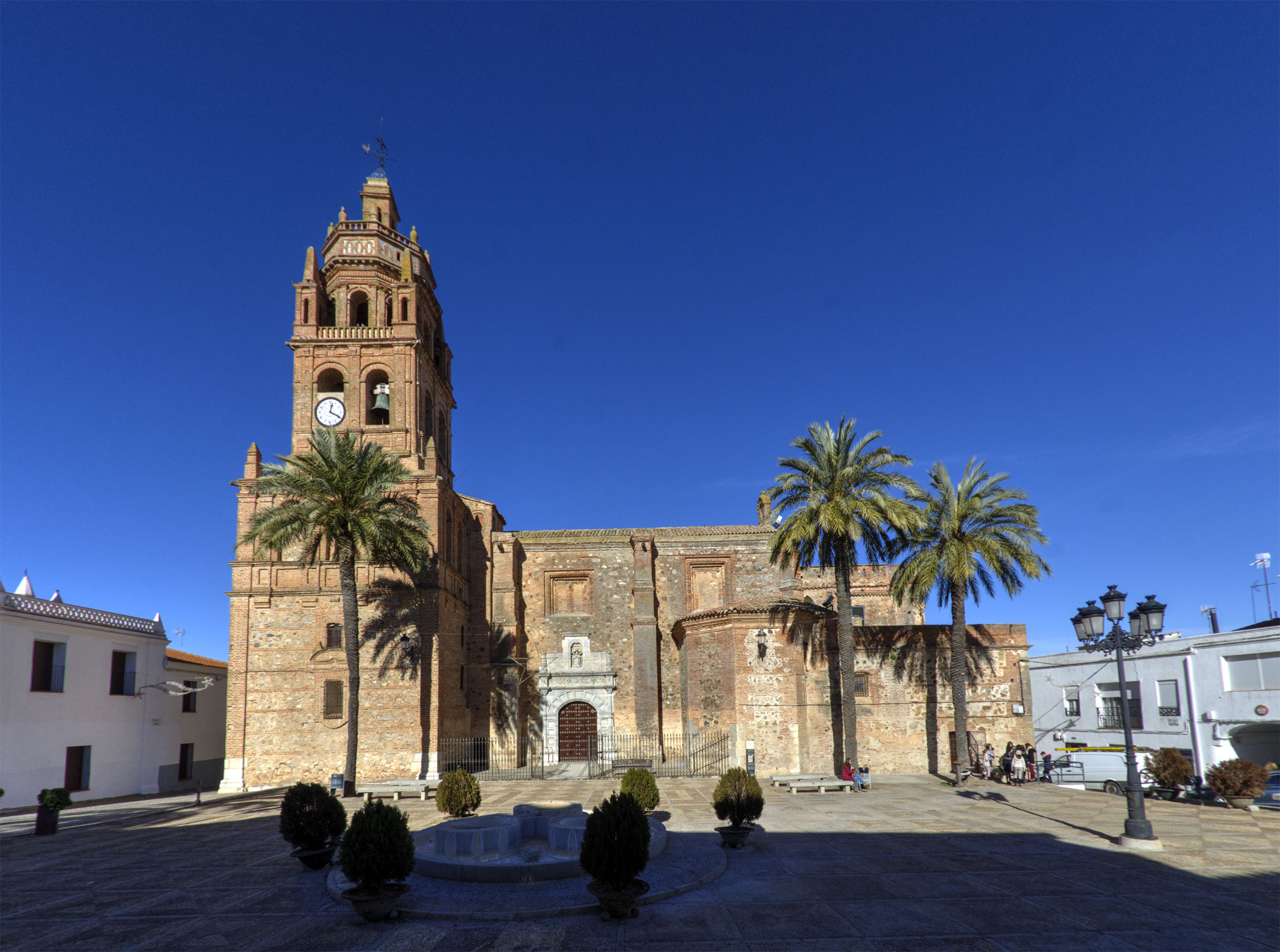
- Our Lady of Angels Church

- Coat of arms

- Location of Bienvenida within Extremadura Location of Bienvenida within Spain
- Coordinates: 38°17′57″N 6°12′33″W
- Country: Spain
- Autonomous community: Extremadura
- Province: Badajoz
- Comarca: Tentudía

Government
  - Alcalde: Antoñito el Fontanero (Ind.)

Area
  - Total: 92.2 km^{2} (35.6 sq mi)

Population (2025-01-01)
  - Total: 1,999
- Time zone: UTC+1 (CET)
  - Summer (DST): UTC+2 (CEST)

Bienvenida is a municipality in the province of Badajoz in Extremadura, Spain. It has a population of about 2,000 and an area of 92.2 km^{2} (35.6 sq mi).

== Notable people ==
- Francisco Núñez Olivera (1904–2018), the oldest man in Spain and the World
- David Astals (born 2001), footballer

== Twins towns – sister cities ==
Bienvenida is a member of the Charter of European Rural Communities, a town twinning association across the European Union and the United Kingdom.
