= Cissé, Vienne =

Cissé
- Commune
- Location of Cissé
- Location within France Location within Nouvelle-Aquitaine
- Coordinates: 46°38′46″N 0°13′43″E
- Country: France
- Region: Nouvelle-Aquitaine
- Department: Vienne
- Arrondissement: Poitiers
- Canton: Migné-Auxances

Government
  - Mayor (2020–2026): Annette Savin
- Area^{1}: 16.92 km^{2} (6.53 sq mi)
- Elevation: 146 m (479 ft)
- Highest elevation: 151 m (495 ft)
- Lowest elevation: 103 m (338 ft)
- Population (2023): 2,869
  - Density: 169.6/km^{2} (439.2/sq mi)
- Time zone: UTC+01:00 (CET)
  - Summer (DST): UTC+02:00 (CEST)
- INSEE/Postal code: 86076 /86170
- ^{1} French Land Register data, which excludes lakes, ponds, glaciers > 1 km^{2} (0.386 sq mi or 247 acres) and river estuaries.

Cissé (French pronunciation: [sise]) is a commune in the Vienne department in the Nouvelle-Aquitaine region in western France.

== Population ==
Historical population
| Year | Pop. | ±% p.a. |
|---|---|---|
| 1968 | 849 | — |
| 1975 | 1,080 | +3.50% |
| 1982 | 1,716 | +6.84% |
| 1990 | 1,858 | +1.00% |
| 1999 | 1,977 | +0.69% |
| 2007 | 2,428 | +2.60% |
| 2012 | 2,624 | +1.56% |
| 2017 | 2,785 | +1.20% |
| 2023 | 2,869 | +0.50% |
Source: INSEE

== See also ==
- Communes of the Vienne department
