= List of newspapers in Latvia =

Below is a list of newspapers published in Latvia.

== National newspapers ==
- Diena
- Dienas bizness (lv)
- Latvijas Avīze
- Latvijas Vēstnesis
- Neatkarīgā Rīta Avīze (only digital)

== Russian-language newspapers ==
- Argumenty i Fakty
- Segodnya

== English-language newspapers ==
- The Baltic Times

== Regional newspapers ==
- Alūksnes Ziņas
- Bauskas Dzīve
- Brīvā Daugava
- Druva
- Dundadznieks
- Dzirkstele
- Ezerzeme
- Iecavas Ziņas
- Jūrmalas Ziņas
- Kursas Laiks
- Kurzemes Reklāma
- Kurzemes Vārds
- Kurzemnieks
- Latgales Laiks
- Malienas Ziņas
- Neatkarīgās Tukuma Ziņas
- Novadnieks
- Novaya Gazeta (in Russian)
- Ogres Vēstis
- Ogres Ziņas
- Olaines Avīze
- Olaines Balss
- Rēzeknes Vēstis
- Rīgas Apriņķa Avīze
- Saldus Zeme
- Siguldas Elpa
- Staburags
- Stars
- Talsu Vēstis
- Tukuma Ziņotājs
- Vaduguns
- Ventas Balss
- Zemgales Ziņas
- Ziemeļlatvija

== Defunct newspapers ==
=== National ===
- 5 min
- Arodnieks (1920)
- Atmoda
- Brīvā Latvija (1943–44)
- Jaunākās Ziņas
- Labrīt
- Latvijas Kareivis
- Padomju Jaunatne
- Rīgas Balss
- Rītdiena
- Sociāldemokrats

=== In minority languages ===
- Biznes & Baltiya
- Chas
- Kamf
- Liboyer folksblat
- Segodnya
- Sovetskaya Latviya
- Ya vse znayu

=== Regional ===
- Ludzas Zeme

== See also ==
- List of magazines in Latvia
