= Tukums =

Town and capital of Tukums Municipality, Latvia

- Town
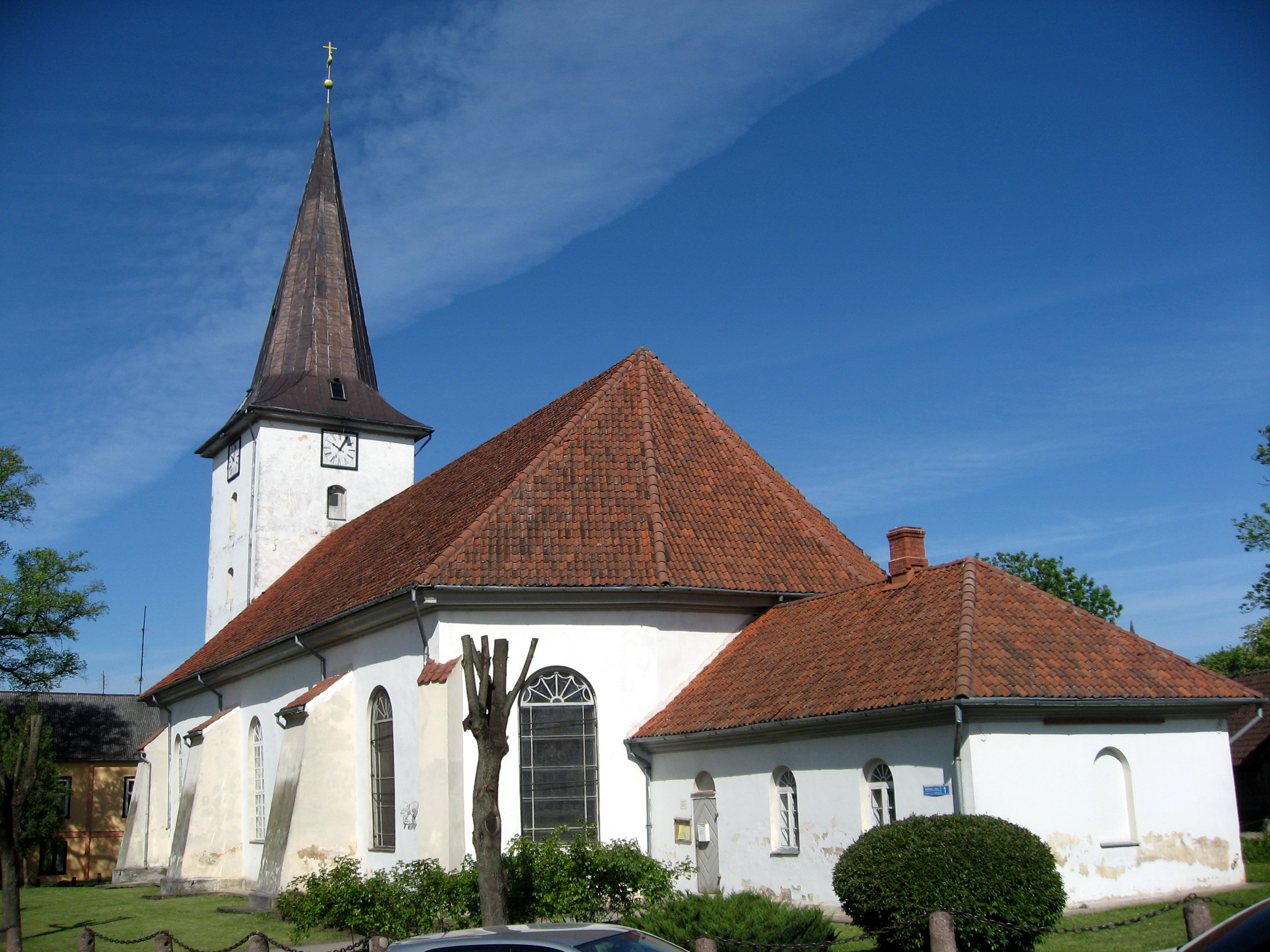
- Lutheran church in Tukums

- Flag Coat of arms

- Location in Latvia
- Coordinates: 56°58′N 23°09′E
- Country: Latvia
- District: Tukums Municipality
- Town rights: 1795

Area
  - Total: 13.64 km^{2} (5.27 sq mi)
  - Land: 13.42 km^{2} (5.18 sq mi)
  - Water: 0.22 km^{2} (0.085 sq mi)

Population (2026)
  - Total: 16,033
  - Density: 1,195/km^{2} (3,094/sq mi)
- Time zone: UTC+2 (EET)
  - Summer (DST): UTC+3 (EEST)
- Postal code: LV310(1–2); LV-3104
- Calling code: +371 631
- Website: http://www.tukums.lv/

Tukums (German: Tuckum; Livonian: Tukāmō) is a town in Latvia which serves as the administrative center of Tukums Municipality. It is located in the eastern part of the historical region of Courland, and with more than 16,000 inhabitants Tukums is the 13th largest settlement in Latvia. It is also an important railroad junction, connecting the town with Riga, Jelgava and Ventspils. It has two railway stations — Tukums I and Tukums II.

== History ==
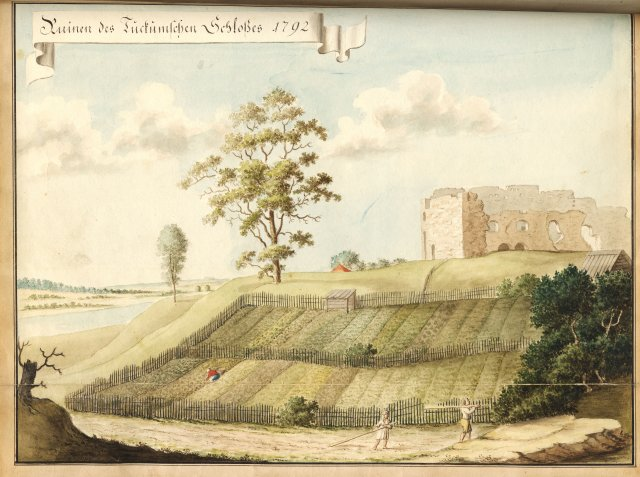
Ruins of the Tukums Castle in 1792

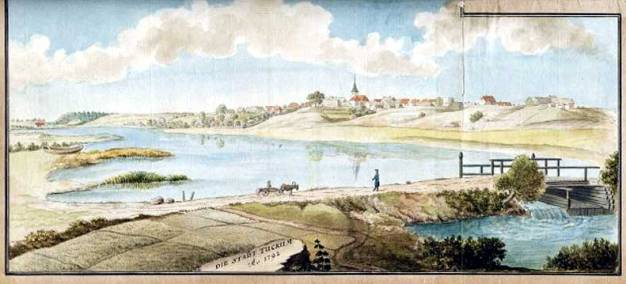
View of Tukums across Lake Dzirnavu in 1792

The historical center of Tukums developed between trade routes leading from the mouth of the Daugava River to Prussia. The oldest part is today's Talsi Street that originated at the river named Zvirgzdupite where there used to be a castle mound with a wooden castle. From 1253 Tukums was ruled by the Livonian Order.

A masonry castle was built on the bank of the Slocene river at the end of the 13th century. The castle was surrounded by settlements of German tradesmen and craftsmen. A marketplace was formed in front of the castle and some new streets appeared later running in various directions from the marketplace.

With the development of trade in the 16th century a new straighter trade route to Prussia was built along a new street that is called Liela (large) Street today which had an important role in the life of the settlement. As a result, public buildings, major businesses, workshops and small shops were built around the street making it the unofficial high street of the area.

After the disintegration of the Livonian Order a new state, the Duchy of Courland and Semigallia was established. Like many other settlements Tukums had suffered greatly the numerous feudal wars. Under the rule of Duke Jacob (1642–1682) Tukums experienced a rapid economic boom.

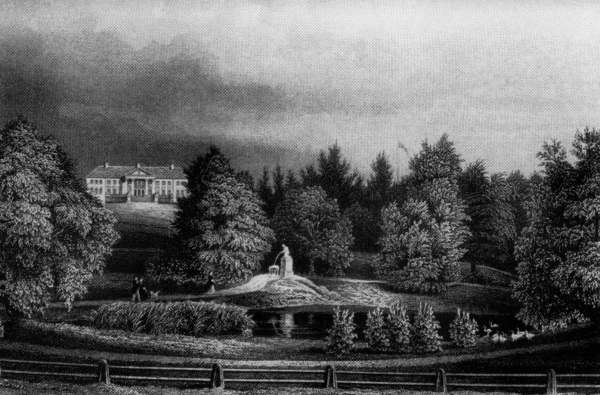
Durbe Manor in the 19th century

At the time, a new trade route was built from Tukums to Jelgava, the capital of Duchy of Courland and Semigallia. It was opened along today's Jelgavas Street and another route towards today's Raudas Street.

Inhabited by only 800 people at that time, the first dam was built and a lake made near the road to Jelgava which was followed by a flour mill and copper-making furnace which was then exported to foreign countries.

The new adornment of Tukums were the lake and the church spire which were added to the skyline in 1687.

After 1795, Courland was incorporated into the Russian Empire. In November of the same year the Russian Tsaritsa Katherine signed a document to divide Courland into regions and to grant regional center rights to several urban settlements, Tukums being one of them. The town borders were marked in 1800 and the first urban map was made two years later.

The town continued growing as it became home to 6 pubs and 131 private houses with around 690 male and 832 female inhabitants.

In 1806, the first school was opened while the street pavement was introduced in 1860. In 1875, street lighting were started with more rapid developments of the town being observed after the opening of the Riga-Tukums railway line in 1877. It is one of the lines connecting Tukums with neighboring town Ventspils.

There were 24 known enterprises functioning in Tukums in 1897 including tanneries, wood-carding mills, glue plants, potteries, food production facilities and the two windmills which are thought to have brought out the uniqueness of the townscape. The town eventually grew along with the rapid growth and development of these industries.

The rich are known to have built their houses in the eastern part around Elizabetes, Pils and Baznicas Streets, but the workers settled more to the West, forming an area of small houses surrounded by gardens. These areas of Tukums were further developed during the year in 1935.

In the beginning of the 1930s, there were 8000 inhabitants and 73 functioning industrial enterprises in Tukums.

In 2019, the town becomes home to the second largest tire recycling plant in Latvia.

== Places near Tukums ==
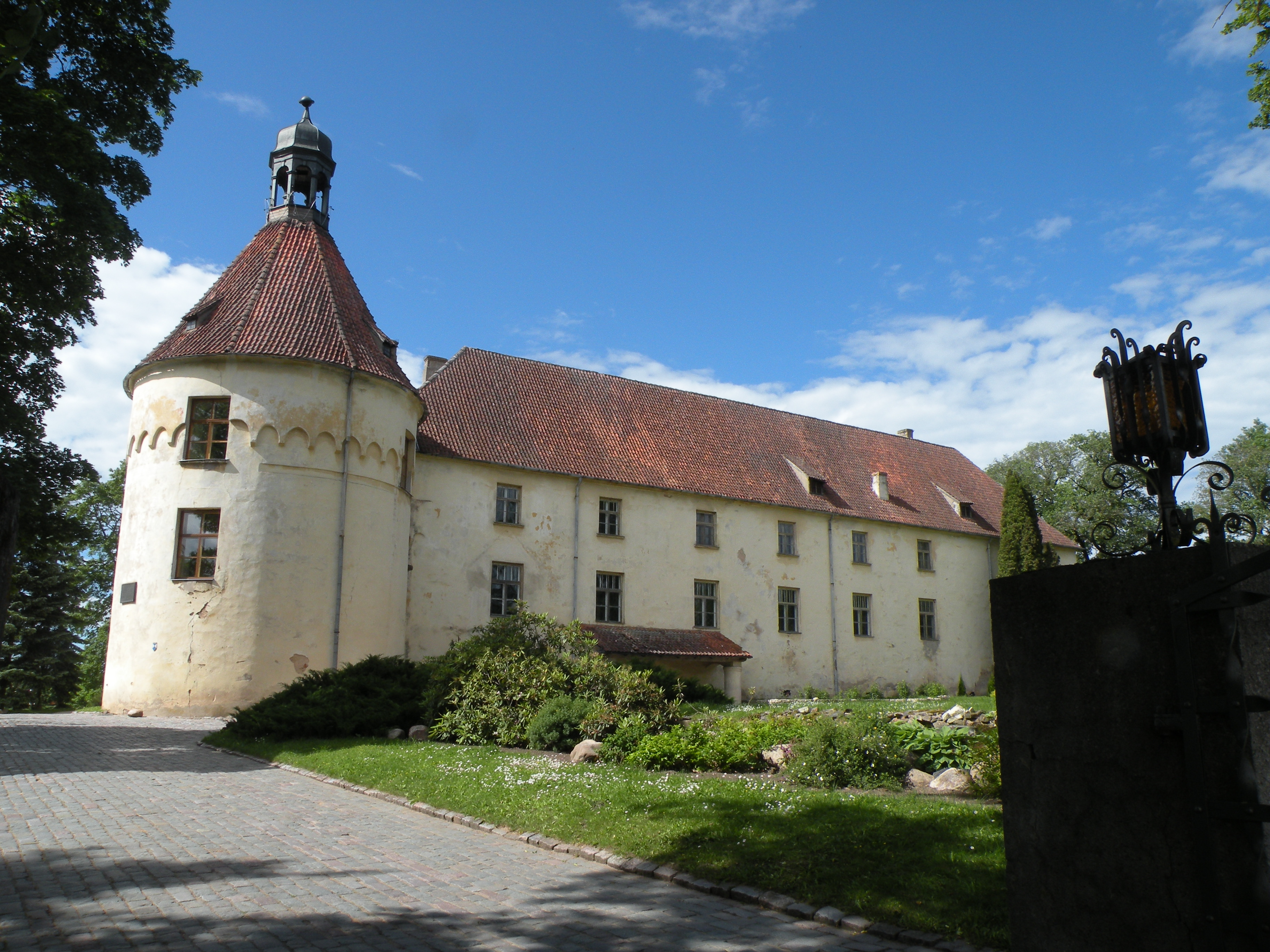
Jaunpils Castle, located 31 kilometers from Tukums

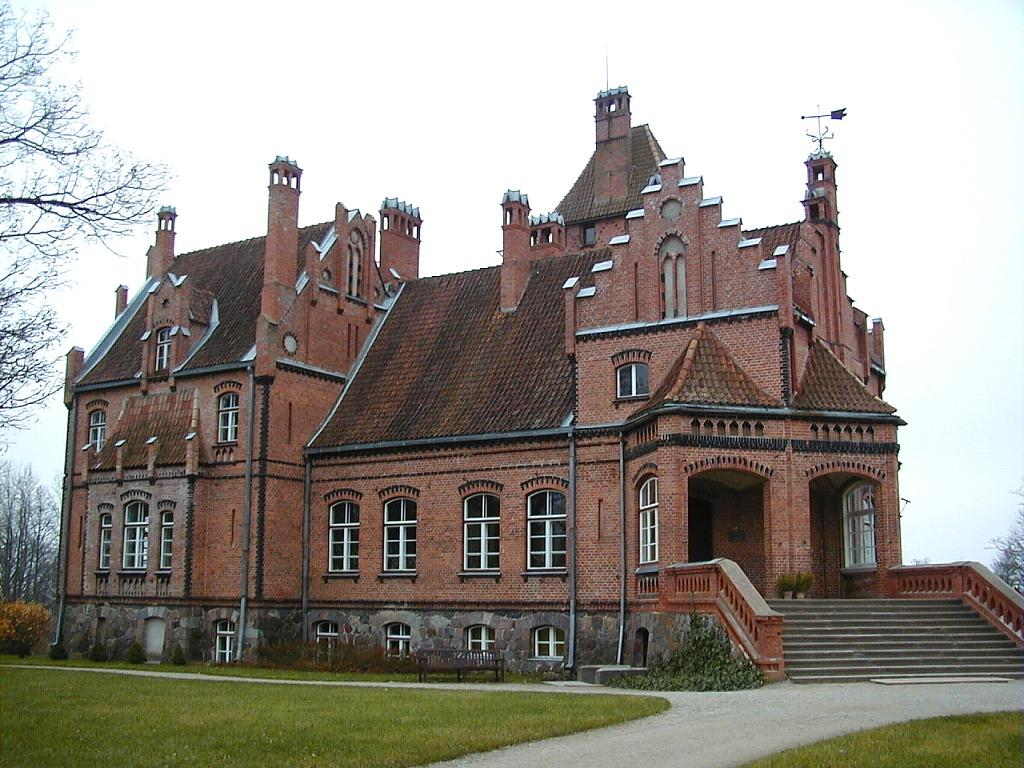
Jaunmokas Manor, located 10 kilometers from Tukums

The Engure parish by the city was host to the Soviet Navy Tukums air base. It was converted into a civilian airport.

Jaunpils Castle is the only fortified castle of the Order of Livonia that remains in Latvia. It was built in 1301. An exhibition hall and museum are located there on the history of the district. Jaunpils Lutheran Church which was built in 1592 is located near the castle.

Jaunmoku Palace (1901), 5 km (3 mi) from Tukums, surrounded by the Courlands hills, hosts an exhibition on forestry. Jaunmoku Palace is a combination of Art Nouveau elements and Neo-Gothic forms and was built as the country residence of George Armitstead, mayor of Riga (1901–12).

Durbe manor house, (Latvian: Durbes pils) rebuilt in 1820, is a classical style palace, surrounded by a landscaped park. A stone bridge across the ravine and a rotunda are located near the manor house.

The Schlokenbeck estate ensemble in Milzkalne, dating from the 15th century, is the only fortified manor house in Latvia. A museum on the history of broad building techniques and an exposition of horse gear is set up there.

In Zante region there is the highest peak of Tukums district – Smiltinkalns (153m); in the center of Zante there is a Red Army tank, commemorating the battles in "Courland Pocket" from 1944 to 1945 inclusive.

The country of Zentene and Seme has the northern landscape of Courland – hills, curved roads, objects of nature and places of culture history.

The seashore of Tukums district has a length of 50 km (31 mi), where old fishermen's huts alternate with modern villas, and sandy beaches interchange with rocky shores and meadows.

Kandava was the capital of the ancient Couronian state of Vanema. In the beginning of the 13th century, German knights built their castle there, though not much has been preserved from that time. In the Middle Ages, Kandava underwent numerous wars, fires and plague epidemics.

The Kandava hills are covered with dense forests and the Abava Rapids of the Abava River. Kandava marks the beginning of the run of the Abava Valley, which is often locally referred to as "Switzerland of Courland" in as early as the 19th century. Since January 2011, the valley has been on Latvia's Tentative World Heritage List, according to World Monuments Fund.

== Places in Tukums ==
=== Museums ===
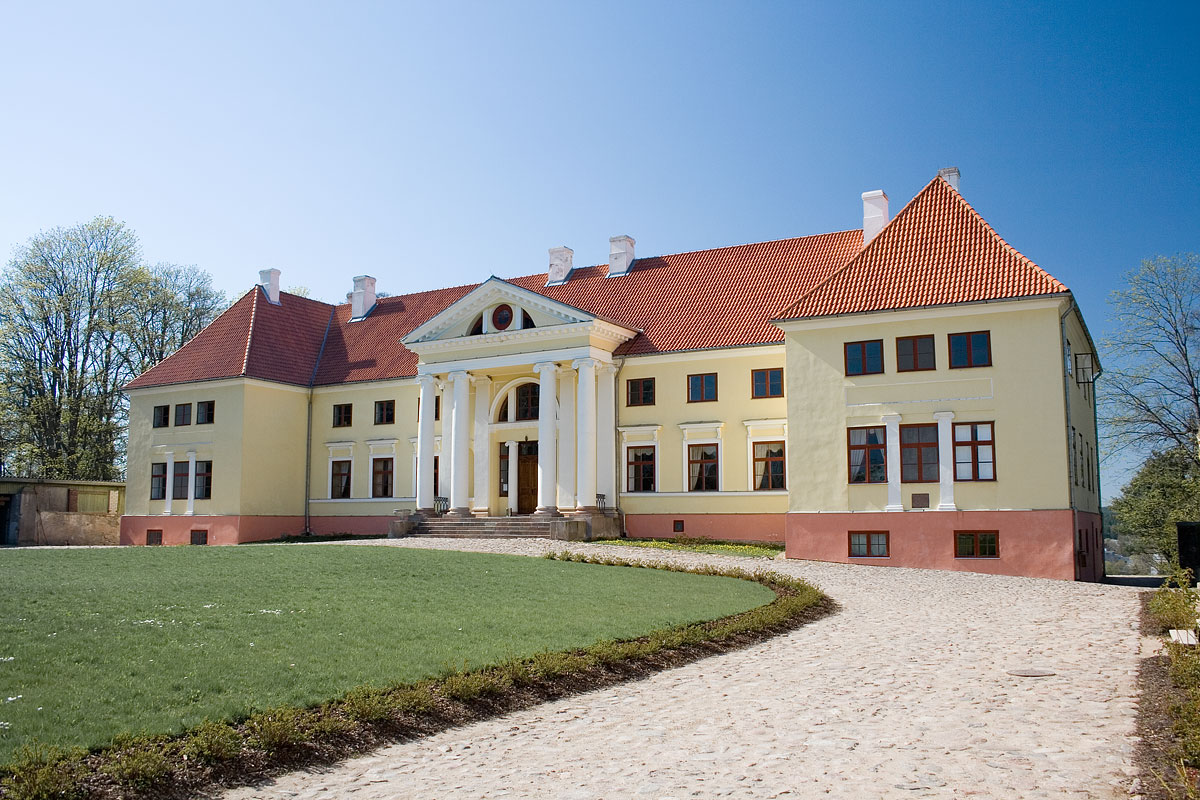
Durbe Manor

- Castle Tower of Tukums – Brivibas Square 19a
- Durbe Manor house – M.Parka Street 7
- Jaunmokas Palace Museum – Jaunmokas
- Jaunpils Museum – Jaunpils
- Pastariņš Museum – Bisnieki, Zentene
- Šlokenbeka Manor – Milzkalne
- Tukums Museum – Harmonijas Street 7

== Notable people ==
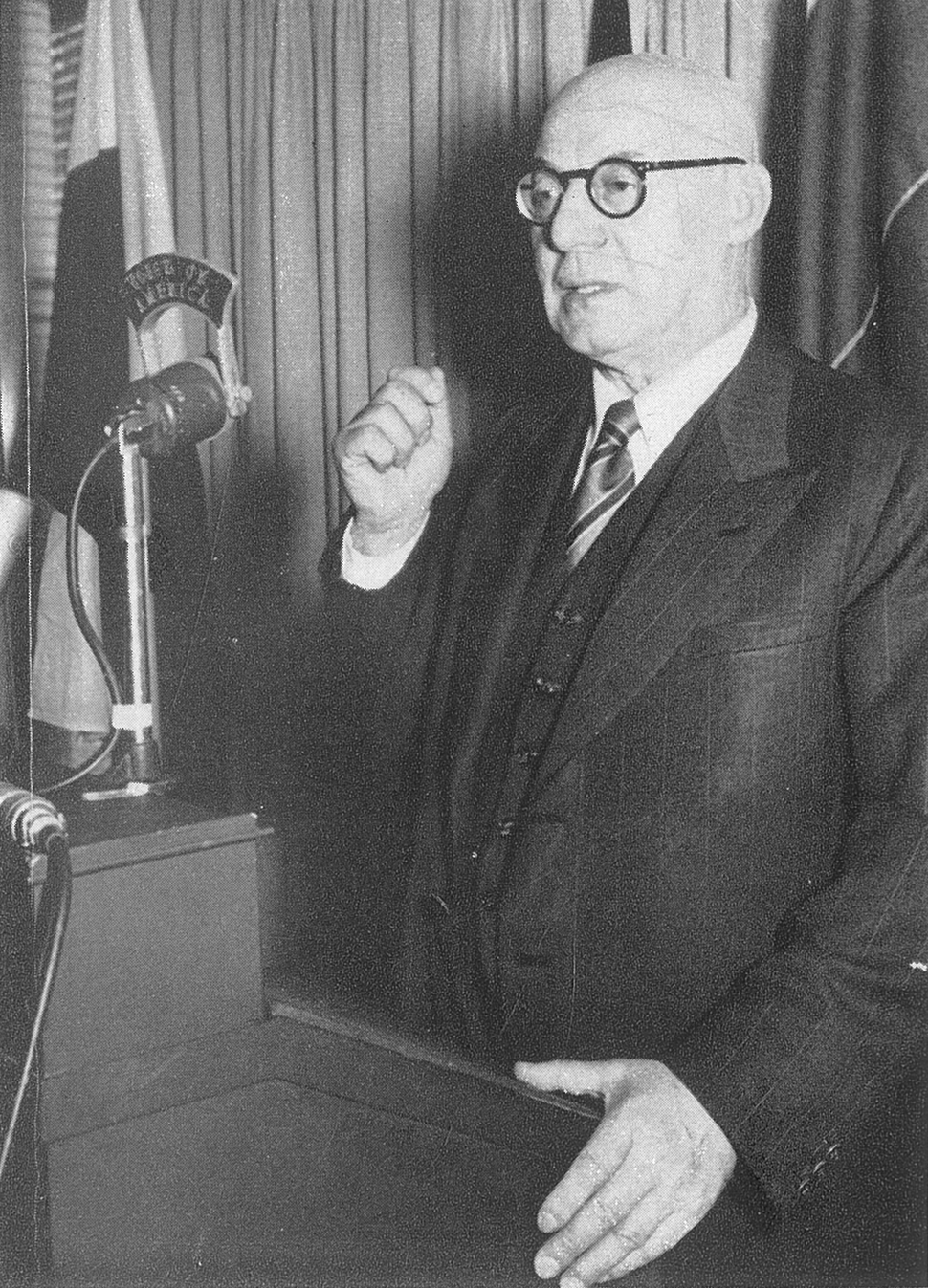
Ādolfs Bļodnieks

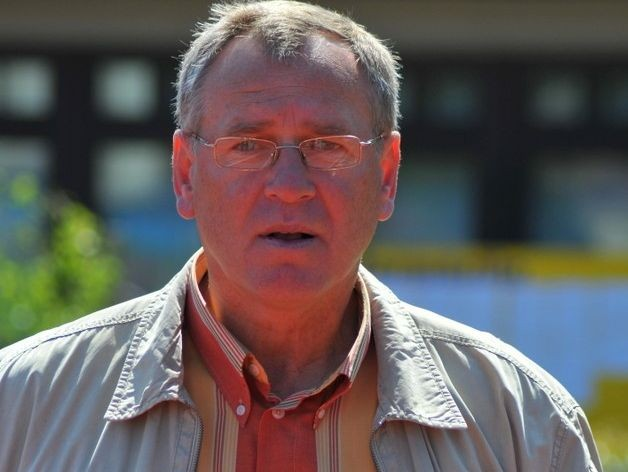
Dainis Kūla, 2011

- Otto August Rosenberger (1800 – 1890), a Baltic German astronomer
- Carlos Berg (1843 – 1902), an Argentine naturalist and entomologist of Latvian and Baltic German origin.
- Adolf Behrman (1876 – 1943), Latvian Post-Impressionism painter
- Mordechai Nurock (1879 – 1962), politician in both Latvia & Israel
- Ādolfs Bļodnieks (1889 – 1962) , Prime Minister of Latvia, 1933 – 1934
- Jānis Roze (born 1926), a herpetologist, biologist and philosopher
- Georgs Andrejevs (1932 – 2022), politician, Minister of Foreign Affairs, 1992–1994 & MEP, 2004–2009
- Bertram Zarins (born 1942), Latvian-born orthopedic surgeon at Massachusetts General Hospital
- Christopher Zarins (born 1943), Latvian-born surgeon, professor, now in USA
- Viktor Tsoi (1962 – 1990), Soviet Rock band Kino leader, died near Tukums
- Artis Kampars (born 1967), politician, Minister of Economics, 2009 – 2011
- Mārtiņš Staķis (born 1979), politician and businessman, Mayor of Riga from 2020 to 2023.
- Samanta Tīna (born 1989), Latvian singer, songwriter and composer of Russian descent

=== Sport ===
- Joe Magidsohn (1888 – 1969), Latvian-born American football player
- Dainis Kūla (born 1959), javelin thrower and gold medallist at the 1980 Summer Olympics
- Kaspars Ozers (born 1968), cyclist, competed in the 1996 Summer Olympics
- Līga Kļaviņa (born 1980), Latvian heptathlete, competed at the 2000 Summer Olympics
- Kristaps Blanks (born 1986), footballer, played over 250 games and 21 for Latvia
- Ronalds Arājs (born 1987), Latvian athlete, competed at the 2008 Summer Olympics
- Ritvars Rugins (born 1989), footballer who played about 300 games plus 30 for Latvia
- Rihards Lomažs (born 1996), basketball player

== Twin towns ==
Tukums is twinned with:

- Andrychów, Poland
- Bnei Ayish, Israel
- Chennevières-sur-Marne, France
- Izium, Ukraine
- Karelichy, Belarus
- Krasnogorsk, Russia
- Plungė, Lithuania
- Scheeßel, Germany
- Tidaholm, Sweden

== Newspapers ==
- Neatkarīgās Tukuma Ziņas
- Tukuma Ziņotājs
