= Wesselhøft =

Wesselhøft or Wesselhöft is a surname. Notable people with the surname include:

- Birthe Wesselhøft (1934–2025), Danish-Swedish artist
- Paulo Wesselhöft (born 1947), American soldier

== See also ==
- Wesseltoft
