= Jonas Åkerlund (politician) =

Swedish politician (born 1949)

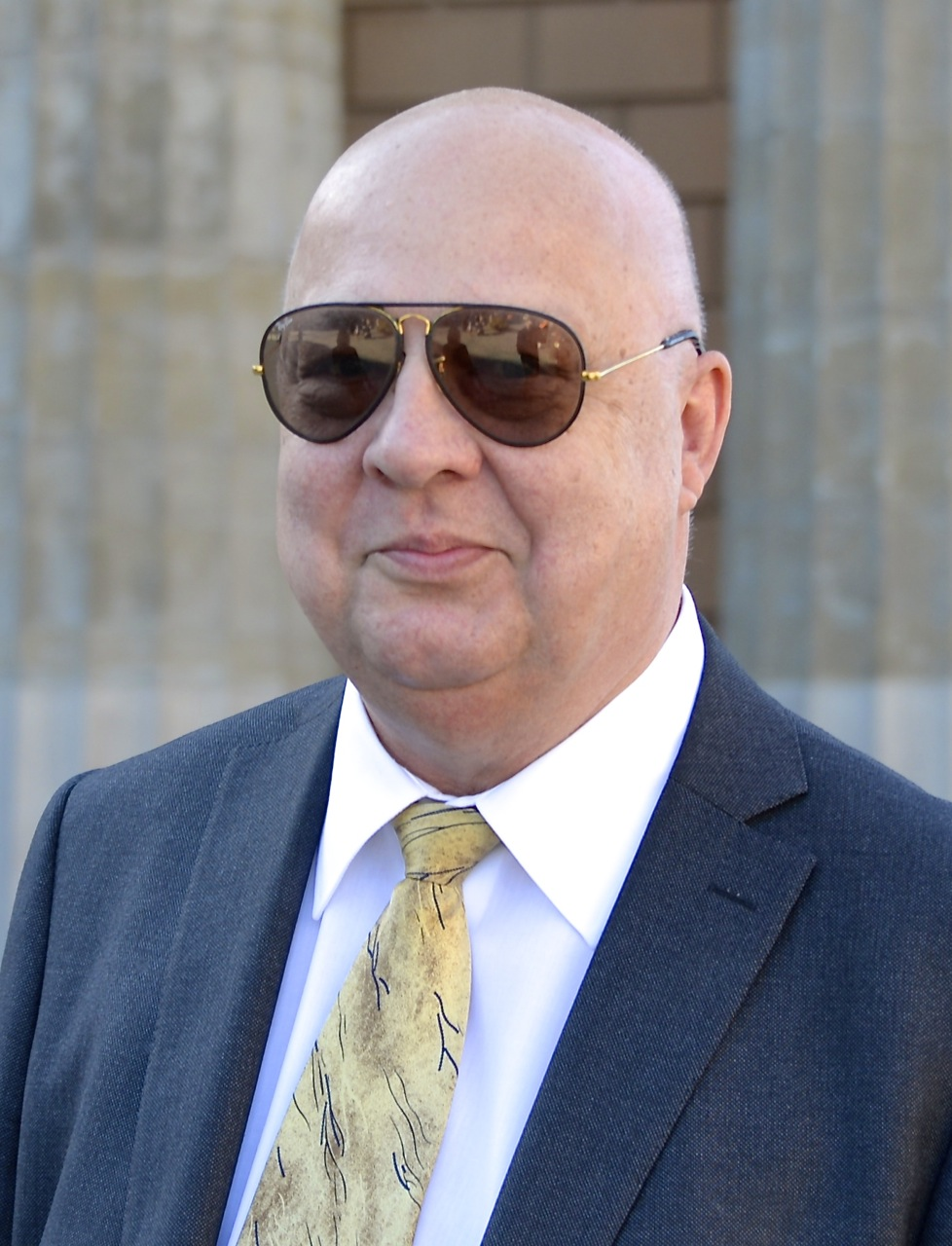
- Åkerlund in 2014

Member of the Swedish Parliament for Blekinge
- In office 2010–2018

Personal details
- Born: Jonas Viktor Göran Åkerlund; 21 January 1949 (age 77)
- Party: Sweden Democrats (1995–)
- Other political affiliations: Moderate Party (1985–1995); Social Democrats Party (before 1985)

Jonas Viktor Göran Åkerlund (born 21 January 1949) is a Swedish politician who was Member of the Riksdag from 2010 to 2018 and first deputy party leader for the Sweden Democrats from 2006 to 2015. He also served as the party's press spokesman.

== Work ==
Åkerlund was born in Lingbo in Ockelbo Municipality. He worked for several years as an undertaker at a family funeral business before his election to parliament.

He started his political career in the Social Democrats party in the 1970s. In 1985, he changed party affiliation to the Moderate Party and from 1988 to 1991 he was the leading member of that party in the Ockelbo Municipality. In 1995 he became a member of the Sweden Democrats. He was the party's press secretary from 2004 to 2005, and in 2005 he also worked as the party's press spokesperson. Åkerlund was elected second vice party president for SD in 2005 and vice party president in 2006. In the 2002 general elections, Åkerlund was candidate for the Riksdag as no. 16 on the SD list and first on the list in the Stockholm regional elections. He was also first on the list for SD in the Stockholm elections.

In the 2006 general elections, Åkerlund was a candidate for SD for the Riksdag as the fourth choice, for Stockholm regional election as no. 9, and for Stockholm city council as no. 12 on the ballot. In the parish council elections in 2009 he was the party's number one candidate in the election to the Swedish Church Convocation, and as no. 7 in the Stockholm congregation election.

Åkerlund was voted into the Riksdag in the general elections in 2010, for the Blekinge electoral district in seat no. 90. As a member of the Riksdag he became member of Committee on the Constitution, and deputy member of the Committee on Business and Industry. He announced he would not seek another term in office ahead of the 2018 Swedish general election.

== Controversy ==
In 2013 Åkerlund gained attention after a recording of him was discovered dating from 2002 in which he called immigrants "parasites" during a broadcast on SD's own radio station. In the same recording he made jokes about sending half a million home and suggested most immigrants lied on their residency applications. After his remarks had become more publicly known in 2013, he stated that he had said them to provoke people but described his words as "immature" and claimed "I said an awful lot of things at the time that I don't stand behind at all today." In 2014 he was criticised by SD party leader Jimmie Åkesson after he was seen acting in a threatening manner towards a female journalist in the Riksdag.
