= Abava Valley =

Valley and protected area in Latvia

Abava Valley Nature Park
- IUCN category II (national park)
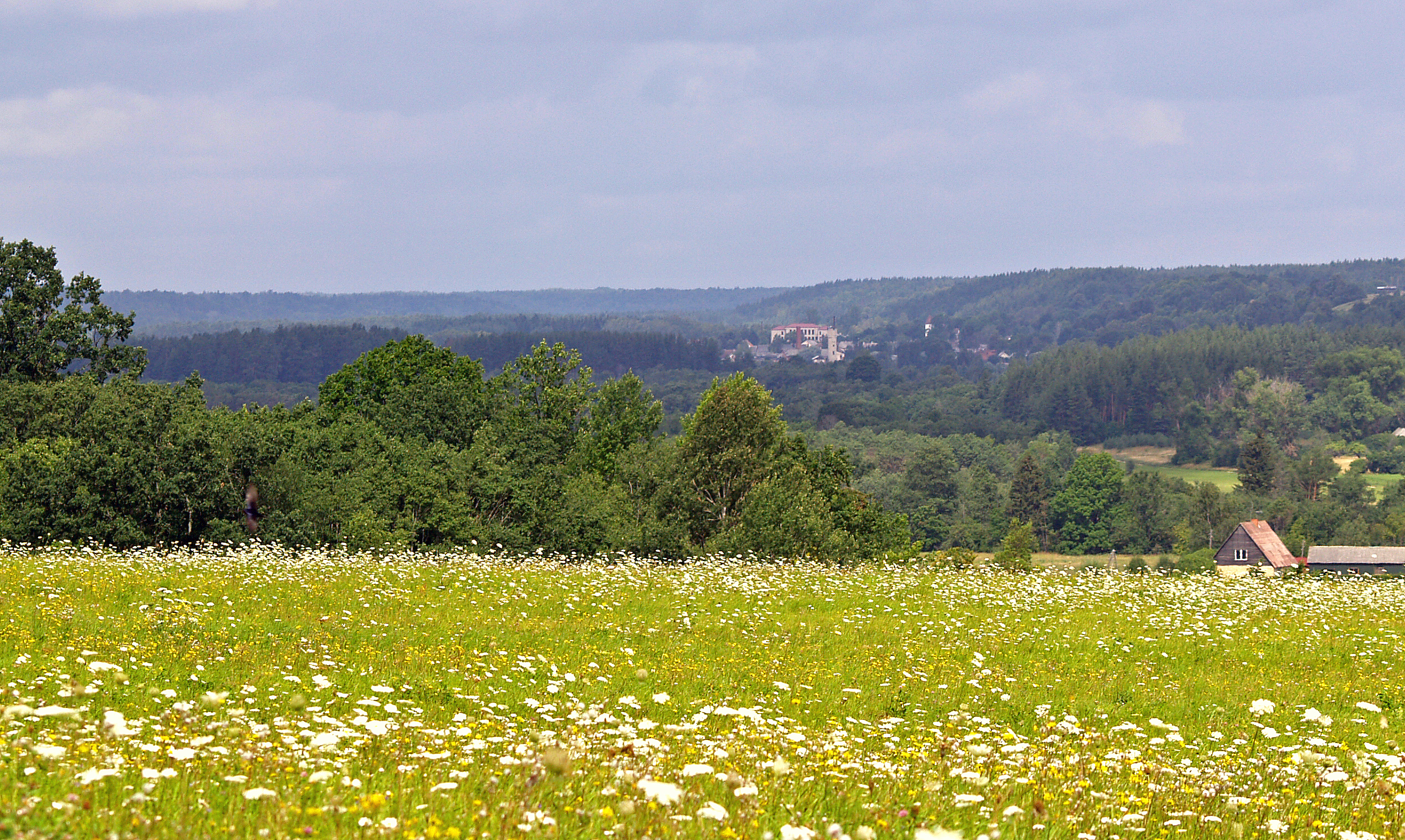

- Location within Latvia
- Location: Latvia
- Coordinates: 56°59′30″N 22°55′50″E
- Area: 14,858 ha (36,710 acres)
- Established: 1957

The Abava Valley is the valley of the Abava River in Talsi, Tukums, and Kuldīga municipalities, Latvia, in the historical Kurzeme region. Following inclusion on the World Monuments Fund's Watch List of endangered heritage sites, on 20 June 1996 the Republic of Latvia designated the Abava Valley as specially protected cultural territory and on 3 January 2005 it was submitted for inclusion in the UNESCO World Heritage List.

The valley is the route of the historical road from Riga to Prussia and Northern Germany, and as such, it is rich in historical and cultural monuments. In its vicinity there are 16 protected nature monuments, such as Devil's Stone, Devil's Cave and Chambers of Mara, five rocks, seven rapids and three historical estate parks.

== Geology and formation ==
The Abava Valley is the most striking segment of the Abava–Slocene spillway, a meltwater channel carved during the last (Weichselian) glaciation. It extends for over 60 km from Tukums westwards towards Renda, varies between 0.7 km and 2.5 km in width and reaches depths of up to 52 m near Sabile and 47 m near Kandava. Beneath a veneer of Quaternary deposits—chiefly glacial till and glaciofluvial sand and gravel—lie Upper Devonian bedrocks composed of interbedded sandstones, clays, dolomites and marls. Erosional terraces are common along the valley sides, which are deeply incised into these older sediments by both the main stem of the Abava River and its tributaries.

== Landslide hazard ==
Slope instability is widespread throughout the steep valley sides, particularly between Kandava and Sabile, where both natural and anthropogenic factors have triggered numerous landslides. Kukemilks's inventory compared legacy 1:25,000 stereoscopic aerial photographs and hillshade models derived from 1:10,000 topographic maps against four days of detailed field mapping. He found that only about one quarter of the landslides spotted in aerial photographs could be confirmed on the ground—and hillshade maps were even less reliable—while many small or heavily vegetated failures went entirely undetected without field surveys. Observed triggers include Late-glacial paraglacial adjustment, heavy rainstorms, rapid snowmelt, river-bank undercutting and, in one case, material removal during road reconstruction. Landslide density here is lower than in the nearby Gauja Valley—reflecting the greater resistance of dolomite and sandstone bedrock—but remains high enough to warrant risk zoning, especially where regional roads and urban areas lie at the foot of the slopes.
