= Åmot (disambiguation) =

Åmot is a municipality in Innlandet county, Norway.

Åmot or Aamot may also refer to:

== Places ==
- Åmot, Buskerud, a village in Modum Municipality in Buskerud county, Norway
- Åmot, Seljord, a village in Seljord Municipality in Telemark county, Norway
- Åmot, Skien, a village in Skien Municipality in Telemark county, Norway
- Åmot, Vinje, a village in Vinje Municipality in Telemark county, Norway
- Åmot, Sweden, a village in Ockelbo Municipality in Gävleborg county, Sweden

== People with the surname ==
- Kristoffer Aamot (1889–1955), Norwegian journalist, magazine editor, politician and cinema administrator
- Rolf Aamot (1934–2024), Norwegian painter, film director, photographer and tonal-image composer

== Other uses ==
- Åmodt bro, a bridge in Oslo, Norway

== See also ==
- Amot, plural for Amah, a unit of measurement found in the Bible (see Biblical and Talmudic units of measurement)
