= Birthe Wesselhøft =

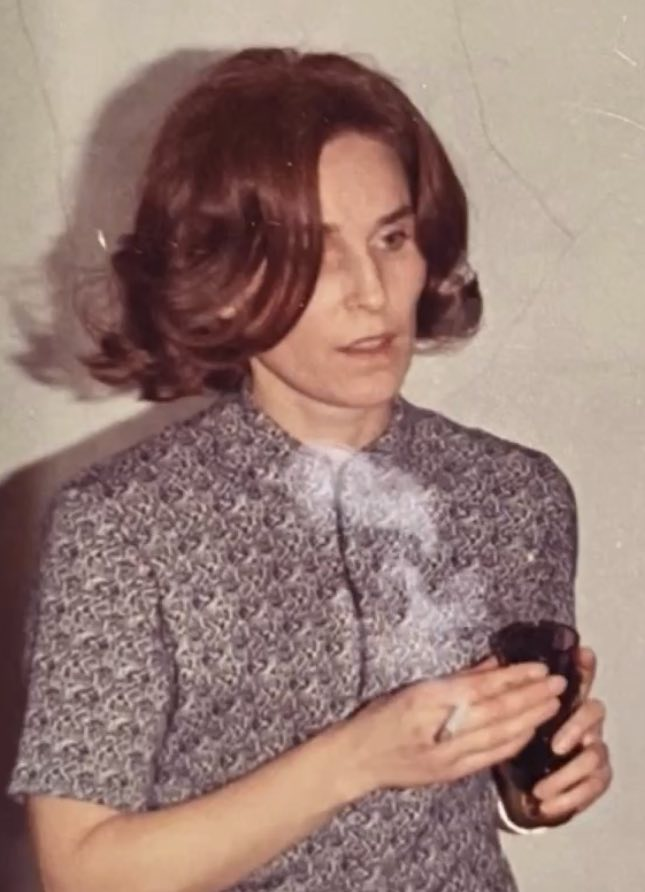
- Birthe Wesselhöft in 1969
- Born: 17 April 1934; Copenhagen, Denmark
- Died: 7 September 2025 (aged 91); Åmot, Sweden
- Occupation: Painter

Birthe Wesselhøft (17 April 1934 – 7 September 2025) was a Danish-Swedish artist who worked with fabrics.

== Biography ==
She grew up in Copenhagen during the German occupation in World War II. As a child, she showed early musical talent and had an absolute pitch, which led to piano lessons. After graduating from high school, she worked for a short time in an office but soon chose the artistic path. She studied art with the sculptor Knud Brøndsted and the portrait painter Regitze Brøndsted.

In 1953 she moved to Sweden after marriage and first settled in Forssjö outside Katrineholm. The family later moved to Härnösand, where she worked as a pianist at a ballet school. Her debut exhibition took place in 1972 at the KFUM in Härnösand.

After 20 years in Härnösand, Birthe moved to Sundsvall for further art studies, especially in art history. She established herself as a full-time artist and participated in group and solo exhibitions around Sweden and Denmark. In the summer of 1995, she settled in Åmot, where she continued her artistic career.

Birthe worked in several different mediums such as oil, gouache, textile and clay sculpture. She was inspired by Cubism (including Picasso and Braque), Impressionism (Monet), the naturalistic Skagen Painters and artists such as Anders Zorn and Pierre Bonnard.

She received a scholarship from Västernorrland County and is represented in several municipalities, county councils and companies.
