= Ufboj =

Yiddish Language Journal

Cover of the October 1940 issue of Ufboj

Ufboj (Yiddish: אופבוי, 'Construction') was a Yiddish language journal published in Riga, Latvia. It was launched as a monthly political and literary journal, by the daily newspaper Kamf in October 1940. Initially it was printed in 3,000 copies. The first issue had 79 pages. Ufboj used Yiddishist spelling. Veteran journalist Max Schatz-Anin was prominent contributor to the publication. A significant number of Yiddish writers from different Soviet republics (including new Soviet republics in Lithuania and Moldova) were first published in Ufboj.

In February 1941, as Kamf had ceased publishing, Ufboj was converted into a twice-monthly organ of the Communist Party of Latvia. H. Margolis served as the editor of Ufboj, B. Schneid became its deputy editor. The format was changed from 25x17 cm to 36x25 cm. By February 1941 circulation increased to 5,000. By April the circulation had increased to 6,000. The twelfth and last issue of Ufboj of 1941 was published in June 1941.
