= Neatkarīgās Tukuma Ziņas =

Latvian newspaper

- Type: Alternate-daily (three times a week)
- Format: Broadsheet
- Owner(s): AS Diena
- Publisher: SIA Novadu ziņas
- Editor-in-chief: Ivonna Plaude
- Founded: 1996
- Language: Latvian
- Headquarters: Tukums, Latvia
- Circulation: 4,834
- Price: 0.30 LVL (0.21 EUR)
- Website: ntz.lv

Neatkarīgās Tukuma Ziņas (English: Independent News of Tukums) is a Latvian language local newspaper, targeted at the residents of the towns of Tukums and Kandava, as well as the rest of Tukums municipality in the western region of Latvia. Published three times a week in colour it supposedly the main source of local information for inhabitants of rural villages.

The newspaper supports and organizes various cultural and charity events (such as Joy for Everyone; the competitions Checkmate; the Big Catch; Gardens in the Sky and others), and publishes an annual calendar book. It has become a natural part of the local social environment.

In December 2009, Neatkarīgās Tukuma Ziņas average circulation was 4,834 copies, down from 5,689 in October 2006.
