= Sabile =

Town in Talsi Municipality, Latvia

- Town
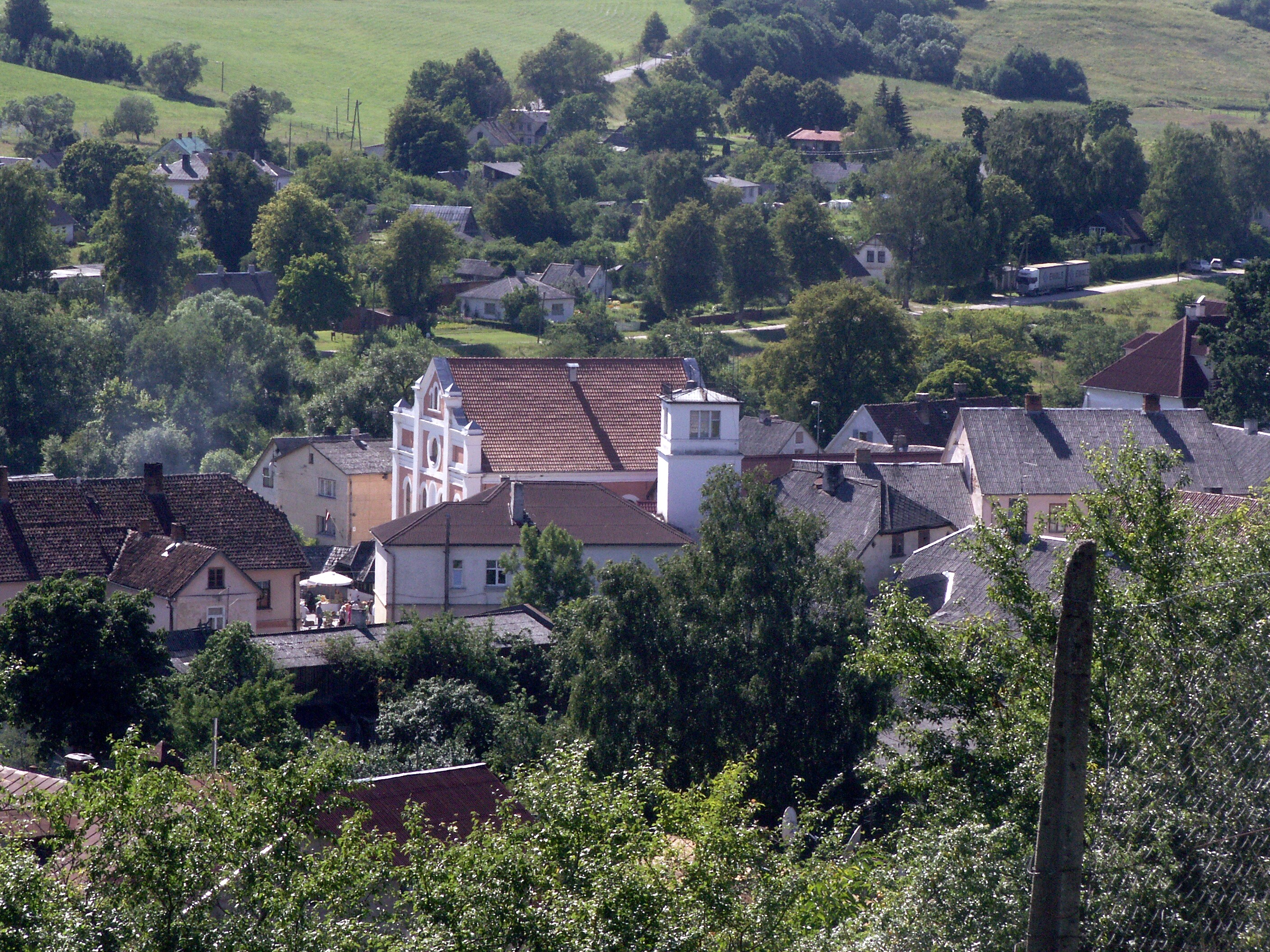

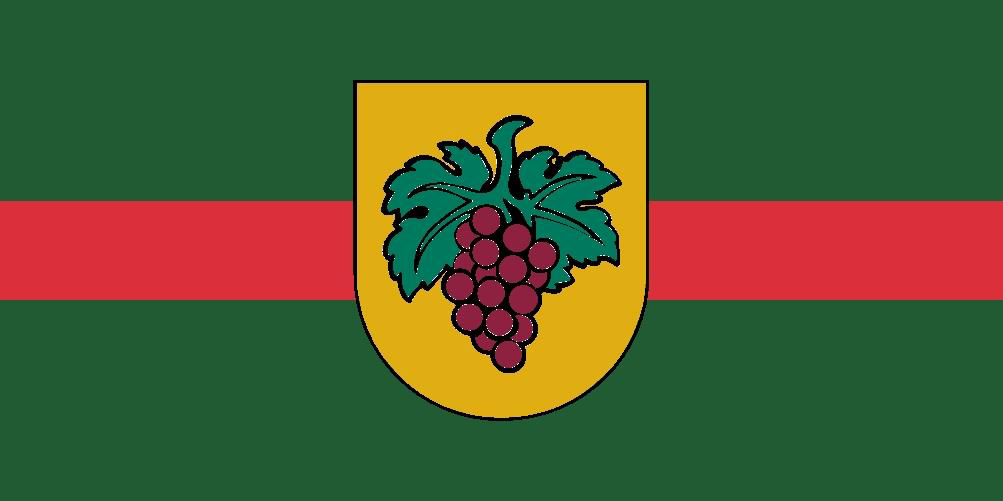
- Flag Coat of arms

- Location in Latvia
- Coordinates: 57°03′N 22°35′E
- Country: Latvia
- Municipality: Talsi Municipality
- Town rights: 1917

Government
  - Mayor: Zigmunds Brunavs

Area
  - Total: 5.22 km^{2} (2.02 sq mi)
  - Land: 5.08 km^{2} (1.96 sq mi)
  - Water: 0.14 km^{2} (0.054 sq mi)

Population (2026)
  - Total: 1,295
  - Density: 255/km^{2} (660/sq mi)
- Time zone: UTC+2 (EET)
  - Summer (DST): UTC+3 (EEST)
- Postal code: LV-3294
- Calling code: +371 632
- Number of city council members: 9

Sabile (German: Zabeln) is a town in Talsi Municipality, in the Courland region of Latvia.

Sabile was first mentioned in chronicles in 1253. From the 14th century to the 16th century, it was a site of a castle of the Livonian Order and a village near the castle. Sabile became a town in 1917. The Sabile Wine hill used to be the most northern open-air vineyard in the world, registered in the Guinness Book of Records. The winemaking tradition in Sabile dates back to the 16th century. For the first time, wine production was created here in 14th century during Livonia, and the hill was completely restored in 1936 by the mayor Osvalds Rezebergs. The Sabile Castle Mound, which was the center of the district from the 10th century to the 13th century, overlooks Sabile and the valley of the Abava River. Prior to The Holocaust a large proportion of the population was Jewish. The Jews called the town Shavilan.

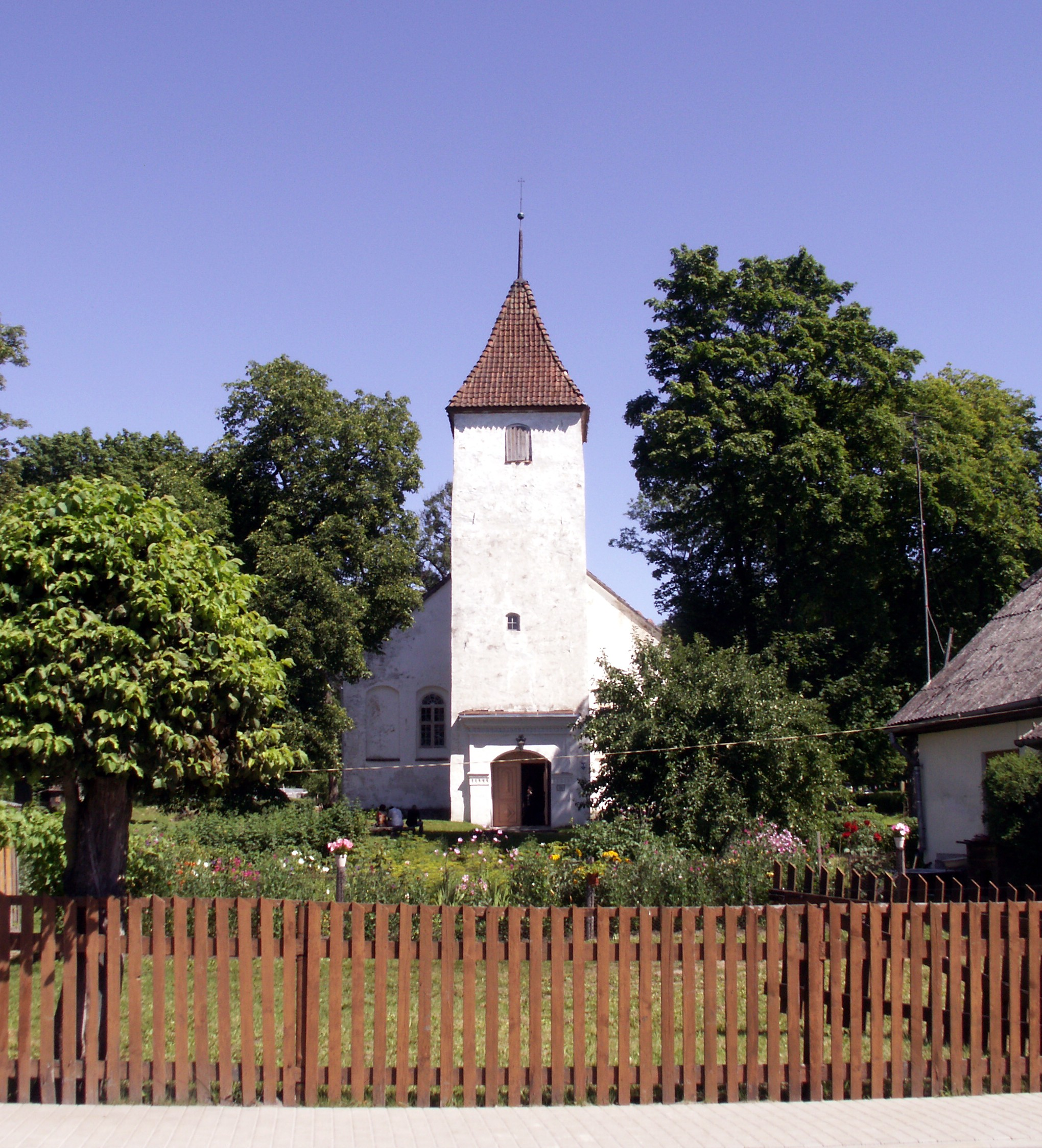
Sabile Lutheran church

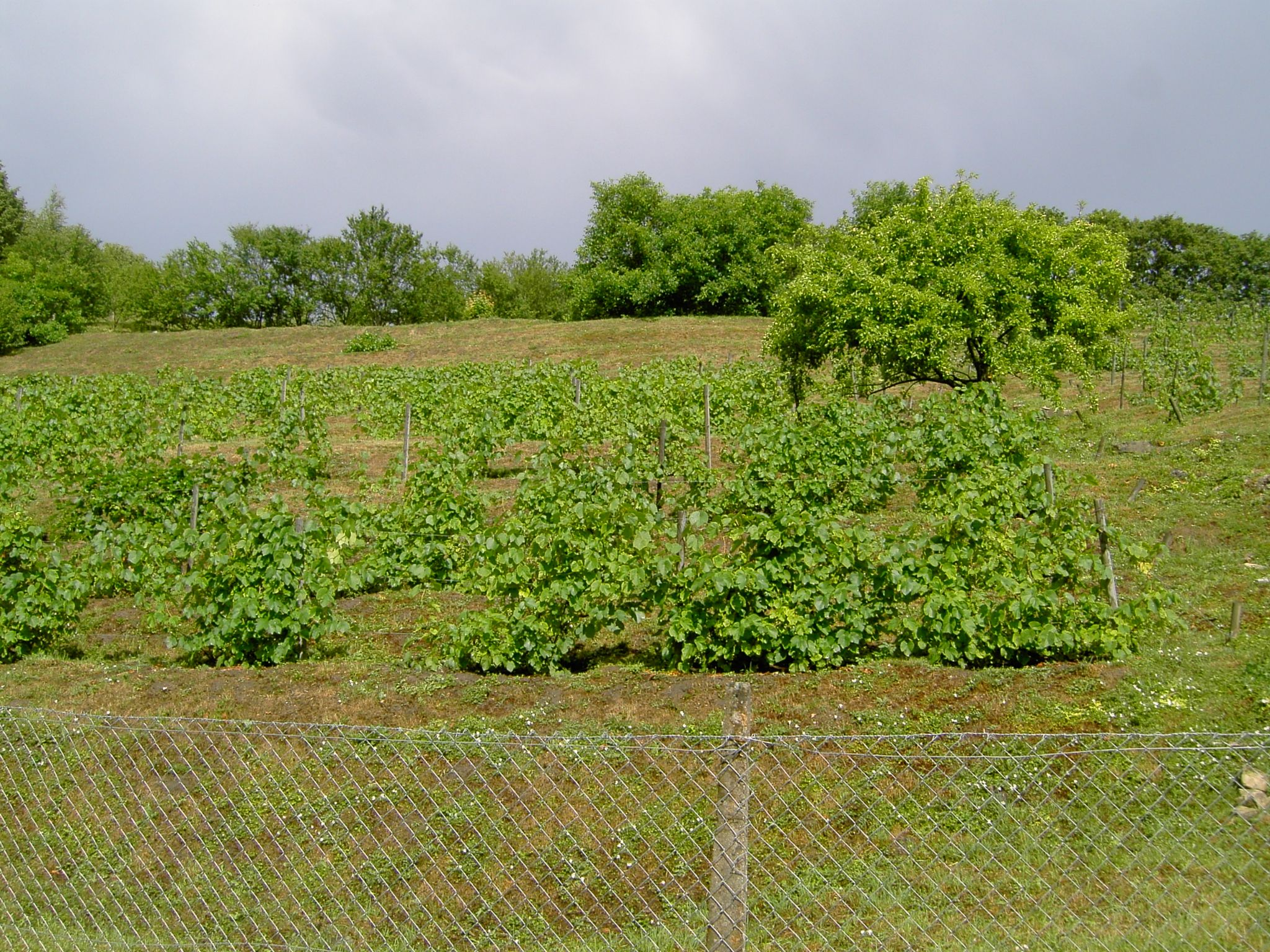
Sabile wineyard

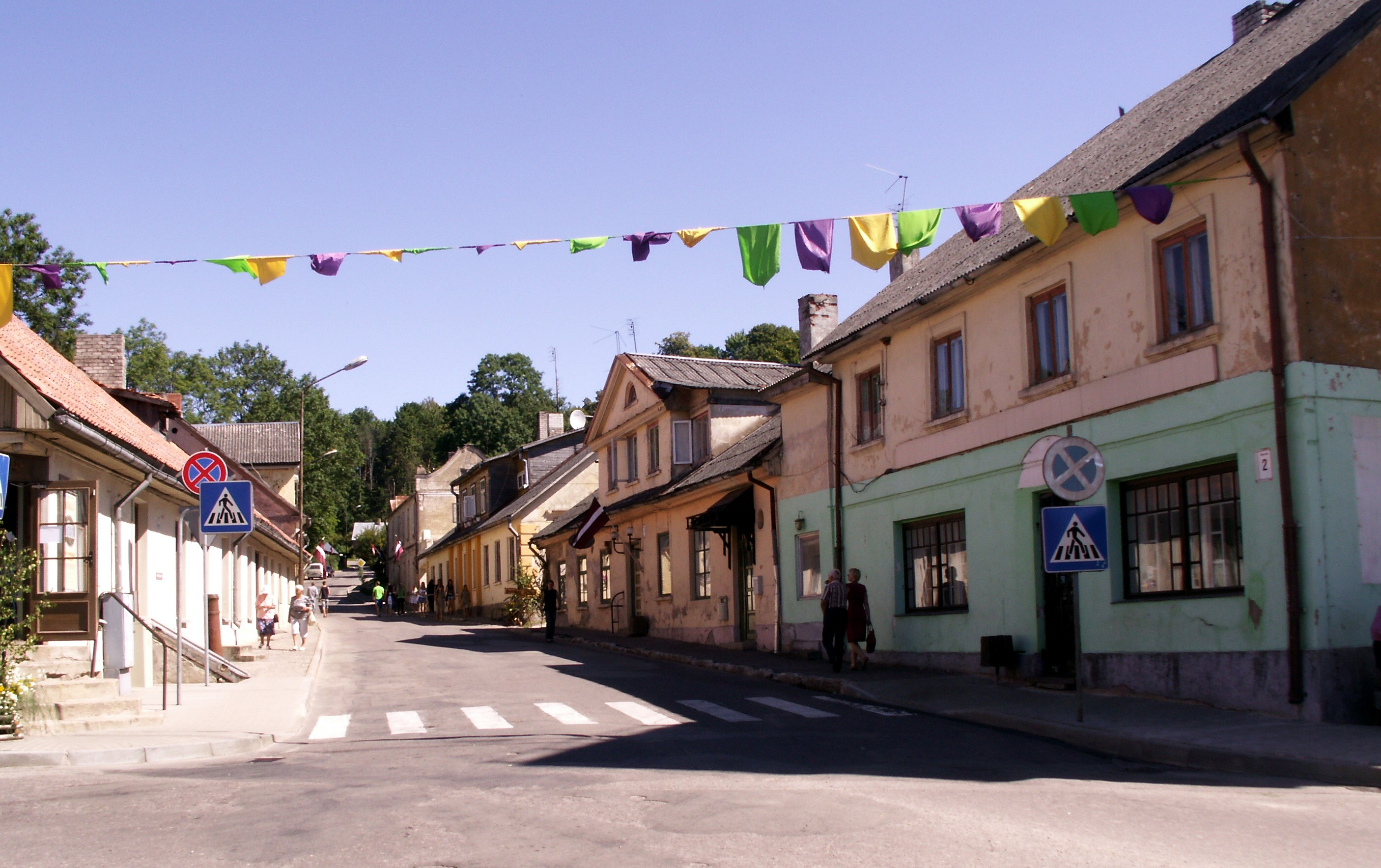
Talsu street in Sabile

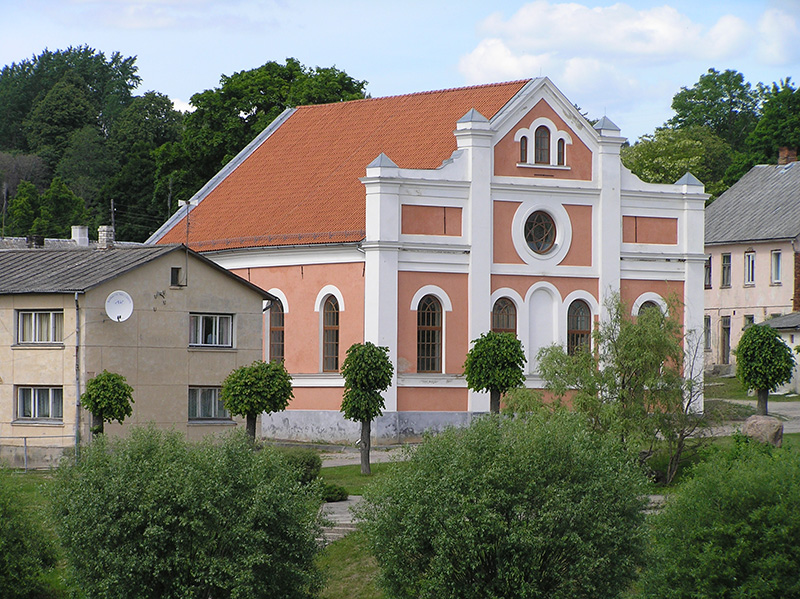
Former synagogue in Sabile. Today Centre of contemporary art

== Notable people ==
- Alberts Šeibelis (1906–1972), footballer
- Ainars Zvirgzdiņš (born 1959), basketball coach
- Markus Riva (born 1986), singer
- Dzintars Čīča (born 1993), singer

== See also ==
- List of cities in Latvia
