= Adolf Behrman =

Polish painter (1876–1943)

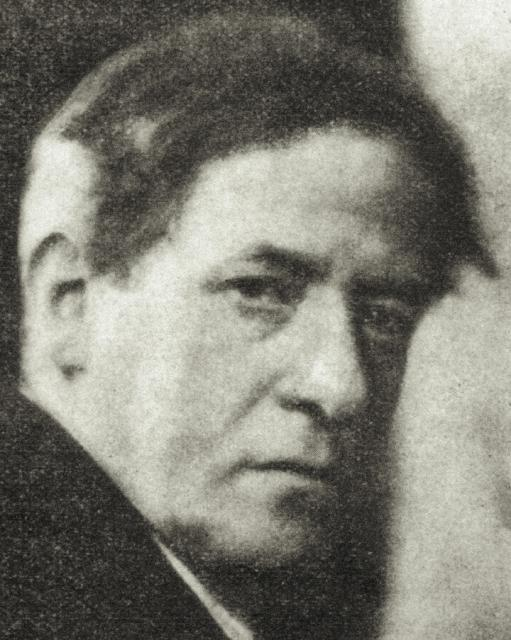
- Born: Abraham Adolf Behrman; 1876; Tukkum, Russian Empire
- Died: August 1943 (aged 66–67); Białystok Ghetto, occupied Poland
- Education: Jakub Kacenbogen's Drawing School; Academy of Fine Arts Munich; Academy of Fine Arts, Paris
- Known for: Painting
- Movement: Post-impressionist

Abraham Adolf Behrman (/ˈbɛərmən/; also spelled Bermann; July 13, 1876 – August 1943) was a painter of interwar Poland best known for his outdoor paintings of Jewish shtetl life as well as landscapes and group portraits. He spent most of his life in Łódź and was murdered during the liquidation of the Białystok Ghetto in the Holocaust.

== Biography ==
Behrman's place of birth is uncertain. He was born either in the town of Tukkum near Mitawa, or in Riga (sources vary), the son of Róża and Markus Behrman, who arrived in Łódź sometime before the end of the century. Adolf studied art under Jakub Kacenbogen at his private Drawing School in Łódź before the 1900s. He continued his studies in Munich in 1900–1904, first privately, then at the Academy of Fine Arts, Munich under Gabriel von Hackl. His paintings inspired the art critic Zygmunt Bomberg-Batowski to write: "Their diverse themes, the depiction – those are always picturesque. This modest artist always thoroughly and lovingly considers any issues brought by a particular theme, in order to best solve the problem of their presentation."

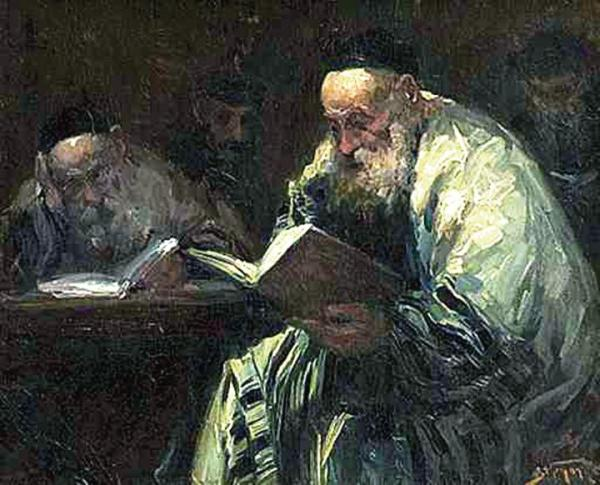
Adolf Behrman, Talmud readers

A graduate of the Academy of Fine Arts in Munich, Behrman's first commercial success was the selling of a series of paintings and drawings to an arts' collector in Łódź in 1905 which enabled him to travel to Paris. He lived there, studied at the academy and worked for the next five years. From 1924 to 1927, Behrman traveled to Palestine, Egypt and later Morocco. His landscapes originating from that period have become the most known part of his work. Behrman's palette became brighter in that period with the introduction of impressionist tones. In the 1930s, he returned to Poland and went to Kazimierz Dolny for the first time. There, he created one of his most important works, Interior of the Synagogue in Kazimierz Dolny.

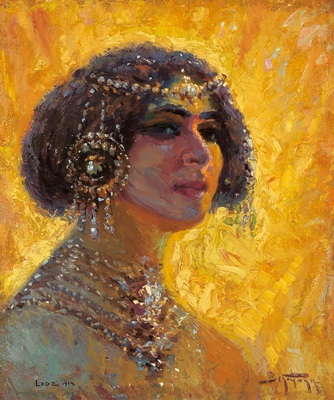
Adolf Behrman, The Jewish Bride (1914)

Behrman was a painter of scenes from daily life of the Polish Jews and views of Jewish quarters. His 1914 painting The Jewish Bride was used for the cover of the book The Stories Our Parents Found Too Painful to Tell, originally a memoir written in Yiddish titled The Annihilation of Bialystok Jewry, by Rafael Rajzner and Henry R. Lew.

His last major exhibit took place in 1935 in Łódź. After the Nazi German and Soviet invasion of Poland, Behrman escaped to Białystok in the Russian zone of occupation. He was murdered in 1943 by the Nazis in the Białystok Ghetto around the time of the perilous Białystok Ghetto Uprising. Many of Behrman's paintings were destroyed in World War II. Some of his paintings can be found at the Historical Museum of Kraków and at the Łódź Museum.
