= Durbe Manor =

Manor house in Latvia

Coordinates: 56.5759°N 23.1134°E

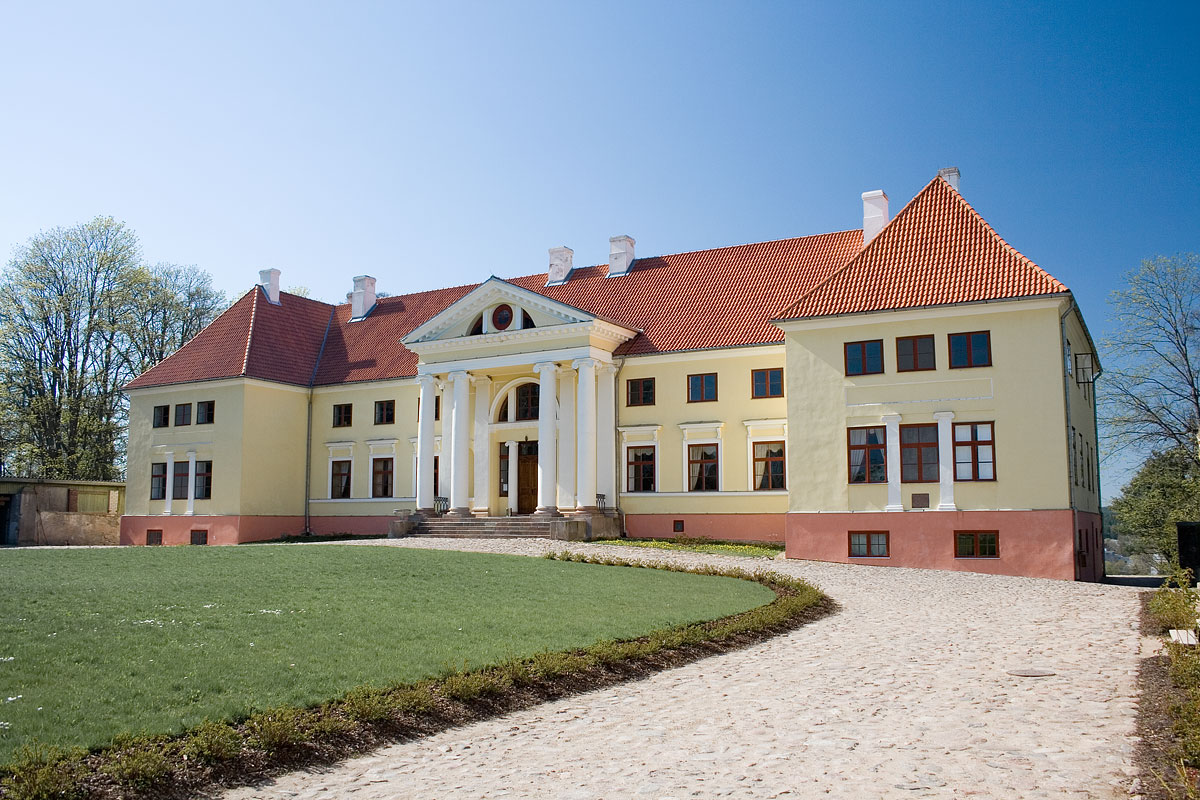
- Interactive map of the Durbe Manor area

General information
- Architectural style: Classicism
- Location: Tukums, Latvia
- Construction started: 18th century
- Completed: Completely remodelled in the 1820s

Durbe Manor (Latvian: Durbes pils, German: Herrenhaus Durben) is a Neoclassical manor house located in Tukums, in Tukums Municipality, in the Courland region of Latvia. One of the most interesting classical manor houses in Latvia. Today it houses part of the Tukums Museum collection.

== History ==
Durbe as was first mentioned in written sources as Šlokenbeka manor in 1475. The core of the current building dates from 1671. In 1820, Count Christoph Johann von Medem commissioned Johann Gottfried Adam Berlitz to remodel the façade completely.

From 1789 to 1808, Ernst Karl Philip von Grothus used the property as a summerhouse. From 1818 to 1838 the estate belonged to Count Medem, while it later belonged to the Count of Jaunpils von der Recke. The family of Baron von der Recke owned the manor from the 1848 to 1920, when the agrarian reform began.

In 1923, Durbe manor was presented to famous Latvian writer and playwright Rainis, who owned it until his death in 1929. However, Rainis used to live there for only short periods and mostly used the manor as a vacation house for teachers and their families. Later the manor was used as sanatorium for tubercular patients and as a hospital. Since 1991, Durbe manor is a part of the Tukums city museum exhibition.

== See also ==
- List of palaces and manor houses in Latvia
