= Kandava Parish =

Parish in Tukums Municipality, Latvia

- parish of Latvia
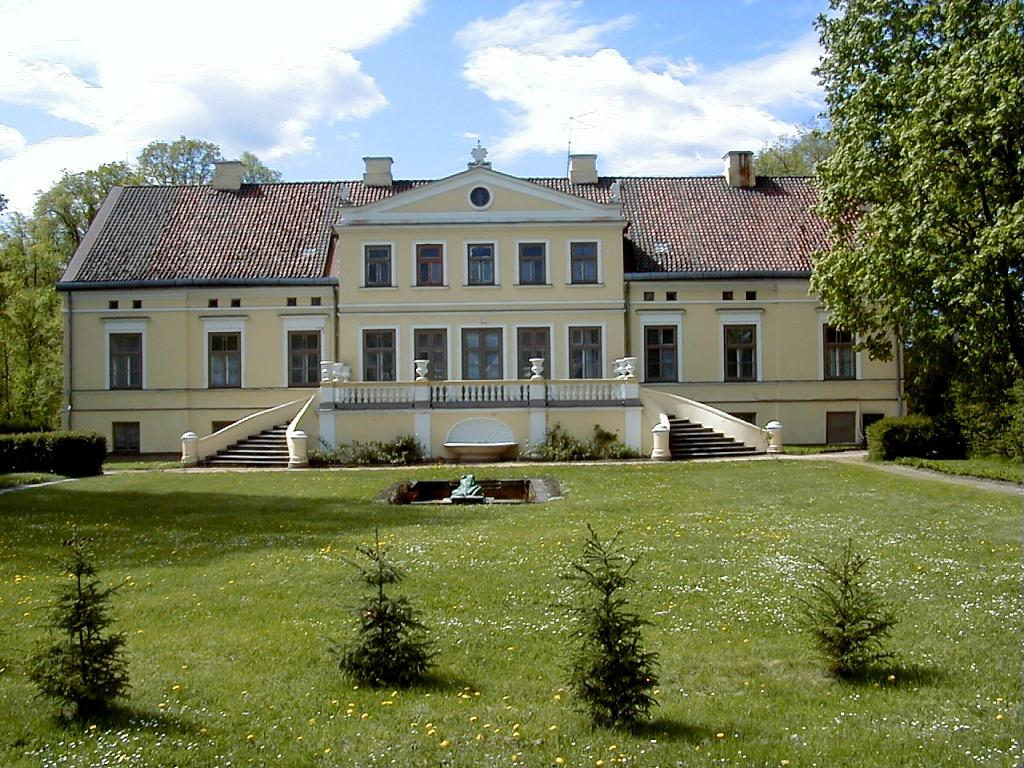
- Casa Senyorial de Valdeki

- Coat of arms

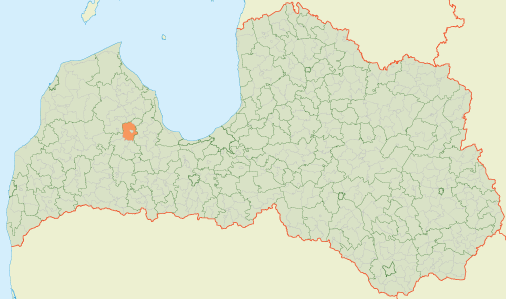
- Coordinates: 57°02′11″N 22°46′34″E
- Country: Latvia

Population (1 January 2026)
  - Total: 1,181

Kandava Parish is an administrative unit of Tukums Municipality in the Courland region of Latvia. The administrative center of the parish is the town of Kandava, which is located outside the parish.

The parish originated in the late 19th century. During the Soviet occupation of Latvia, the parish was abolished in 1949 and split into various selsoviets (village councils), of which the Kandava and Līga villages were added to the town of Kandava as its rural territory in 1957. After the restoration of Latvian independence, parishes were restored in 1990, with Kandava Parish following in 1991. However, in 1996 this was reversed and Kandava Rural Territory was reestablished. In 1999, Kandava and its rural territory was reorganized into Kandava Municipality. After the 2009 administrative reform, Kandava Municipality was expanded and elevated to first-level status, and thus Kandava Parish was reestablished as a second-level municipality. After the 2021 reform, Kandava Parish became a part of Tukums Municipality.
