= Realexamen =

School examination in Sweden

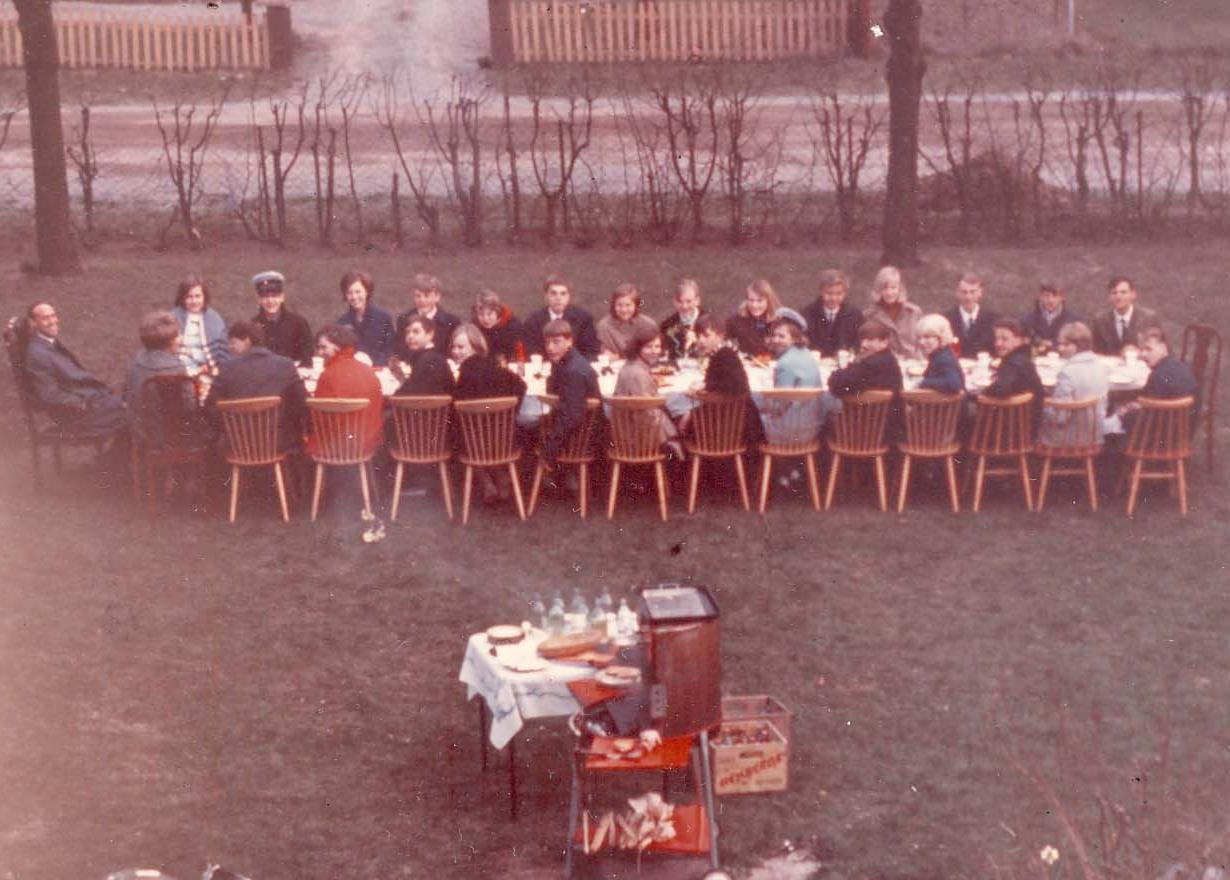
Celebration of a completed realexamen in a Stockholm suburb, 1965.

Realexamen, colloquially referred to as realskolexamen until 1928, was an examination in Sweden that could be taken at gymnasiums or municipal secondary schools. A common informal term for it was realen. Those who had passed the realexamen were entitled to wear a (light) gray cap, similar in design to the student cap.

== History ==
=== Background ===
The realexamen was a final examination at a secondary school or an equivalent institution under municipal or state administration. It could also be described as a general school certificate. It could also be issued by private schools with examination rights. The term realexamen was introduced in 1905, replacing the previous term realskolexamen in 1928.

The introduction of realexamen followed the division of Swedish secondary schools in 1905 into two parts: a six-year lower section (realskola) and a four-year upper section (gymnasium). The secondary school system was entirely separate from the Swedish folk school, and students aged 9–12 with knowledge equivalent to the third year of primary school could enter secondary school. The six-year lower section concluded with the realexamen, while the four-year upper section ended with the studentexamen.

Subjects taught in realskola included Christianity, Swedish, German, English, history, geography, mathematics, natural sciences, penmanship, drawing, music, and physical education; French was an optional subject in the final year. In schools that admitted female students, sewing and other domestic skills were also taught.

=== Development ===
In 1909, the municipal intermediate school (kommunal mellanskola) also provided an opportunity to take the mellanskolexamen, which was equivalent to the realexamen. At the same time, a few secondary schools opened for girls, designated as co-educational schools (samskolor), but most female students who wished to pursue further education were directed to private or municipal girls' schools. It was not until 1927 that state-run secondary schools were opened to girls.

The parallel systems of primary schools, secondary schools, and girls' schools were seen as problematic by those advocating for a unified basic education system.

After passing the realexamen, students could begin working or apply to vocational schools such as business schools, nursing schools, and teacher training colleges. It was possible to enter gymnasium without taking the realexamen by leaving secondary school after year 4⁵ or 3⁴ and applying directly to the four-year gymnasium. Those who had taken the realexamen only needed to complete three years of gymnasium.

The realexamen consisted of both written and oral tests, typically covering four different subjects.

=== Correspondence schools and evening schools ===
In 1936, the Swedish parliament decided to extend the folk school to seven years. However, higher education remained inaccessible to many for economic reasons, leading to the establishment of special correspondence secondary schools and evening schools. The largest correspondence institutes were Hermods and NKI. The State Evening School was founded in 1938.

=== Abolition ===
Between 1950 and 1972, the realexamen was gradually abolished alongside the extension of compulsory schooling in Sweden to nine years. This change followed the educational reform proposal of the 1946 Swedish school commission, which was appointed after the 1945 change in government. The commission's 1948 report proposed the introduction of a nine-year compulsory school system, eliminating both the folk and secondary schools. The new system was divided into three stages: lower, middle, and upper levels. However, the structure of higher education remained a topic of political debate.

By 1972, the term realexamen had been completely abolished, as secondary schools were replaced by the gymnasium system and the nine-year comprehensive school had been fully implemented throughout Sweden. This reform established a uniform basic education system, replacing the previous parallel systems of folk, secondary, and gymnasium education.

The last realexamen was taken in the spring of 1973.

== Etymology ==
The term realskola first appeared in Swedish texts in 1771. Initially, it referred to institutions without university affiliation that provided education in modern languages but not Greek or Latin (unlike Latin schools). The term later acquired its modern meaning of a school leading to gymnasium, first recorded in 1904. The word is derived from the German Realschule.
