= Abava =

River in Latvia

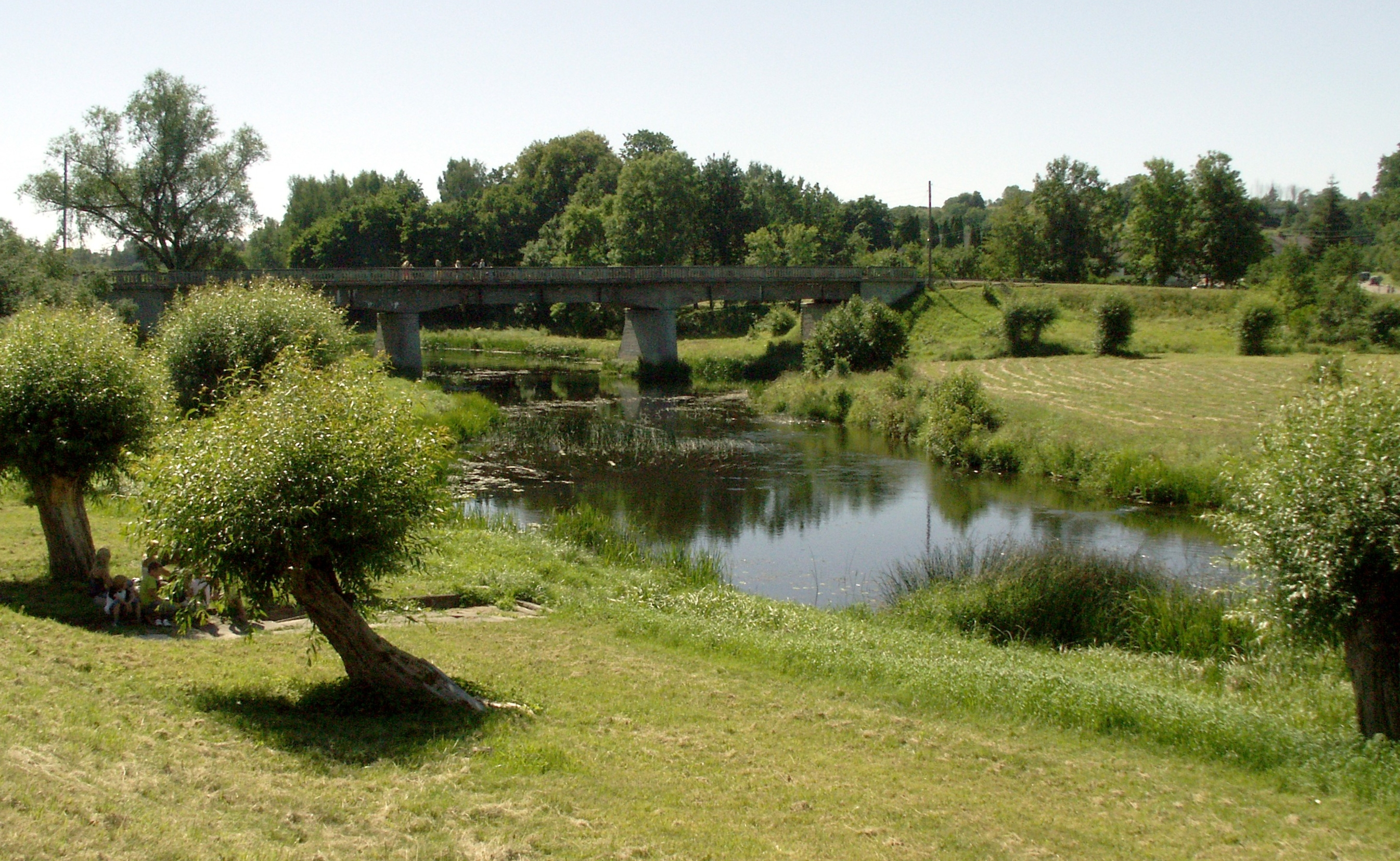
- The Abava by Sabile

Location
- Country: Latvia

Physical characteristics
- Source
  - location: Lestene swamp, Latvia
  - elevation: 47 m (154 ft)
- Mouth
  - location: Venta
- Length: 134 km (83 mi)
- Basin size: 2,042 km^{2} (788 sq mi)

The Abava is a river in Latvia and the largest tributary of the Venta. It flows through Tukums, Talsi and Kuldiga districts. Fifty percent of the Abava basin is covered by forests.

Its valley was submitted for inclusion in the UNESCO World Heritage List.

== Characteristics of the river ==
The river begins at the Lestenes-Ēnavas marsh, on the eastern side of the Eastern Courland Highlands at an elevation of fifty-four metres (177 ft) above sea level. The upper Abava is straightened, and flows in a northerly direction. At Kandava, it turns westward and follows a winding course. It descends through a height of 51 metres (167 ft). The river has a number of dolomite rapids with a velocity of 2 metres per second (6.6 ft/s). The second largest waterfall in Latvia, the Abava Waterfall (Latvian: Abavas rumba), is on this river.

The Abava is crossed by an unusual "Bridge to Nowhere" (Tilts uz nekurieni) in Irlava parish, near Sāti. Built in 1940 as part of a planned railway between Tukums and Kuldiga, it was completed but the railway linkage construction was halted by World War II. During their occupation of Latvia, the Germans made initial plans to complete the railroad, but were unsuccessful in carrying the plans to completion. The concrete span is 55 meters in length.
