= Ogres Vēstis =

Latvian newspaper

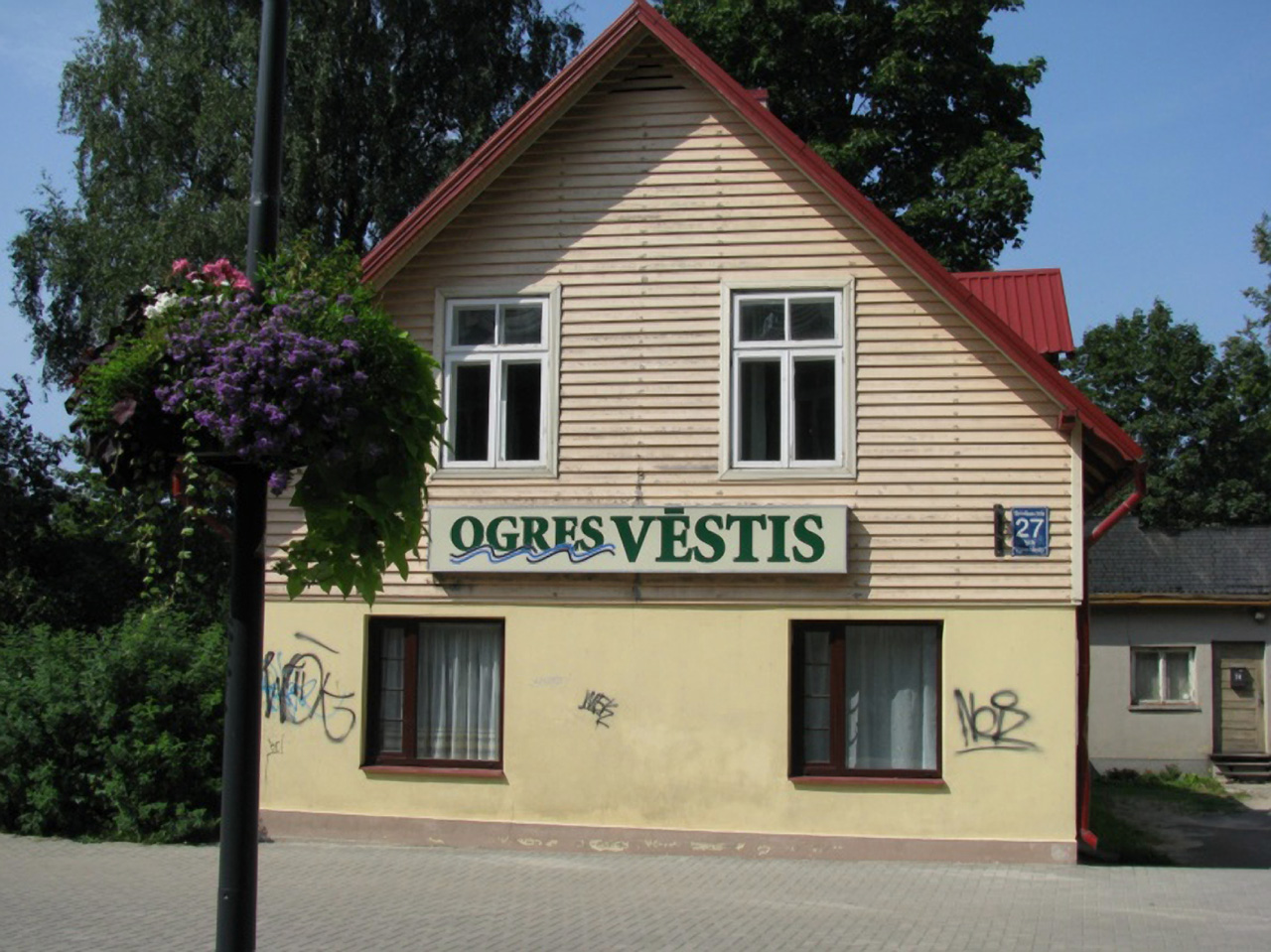
- Language: Latvian
- Headquarters: Ogre, Latvia

Ogres Vēstis (News of the Ogre) is a regional newspaper published in Ogre, Latvia.
