= Olaines Balss =

Latvian newspaper

- Language: Latvian

Olaines Balss is a regional newspaper published in Latvia.
