= Rītdiena =

Free newspaper published in Latvia

- Language: Latvian

Rītdiena (Tomorrow) was a free newspaper published in Latvia. It was published once a week, from 2005 to December 2007 in a printed form. The newspaper claimed to have 173 thousands subscribers. At the end of 2007, Latvian Post stopped delivering Rītdiena, because the newspaper owed Ls 647,300 to Latvian Post. The newspaper then stopped publishing a printed version but continued publishing electronically on its website until June 2008.
