= Lingbo =

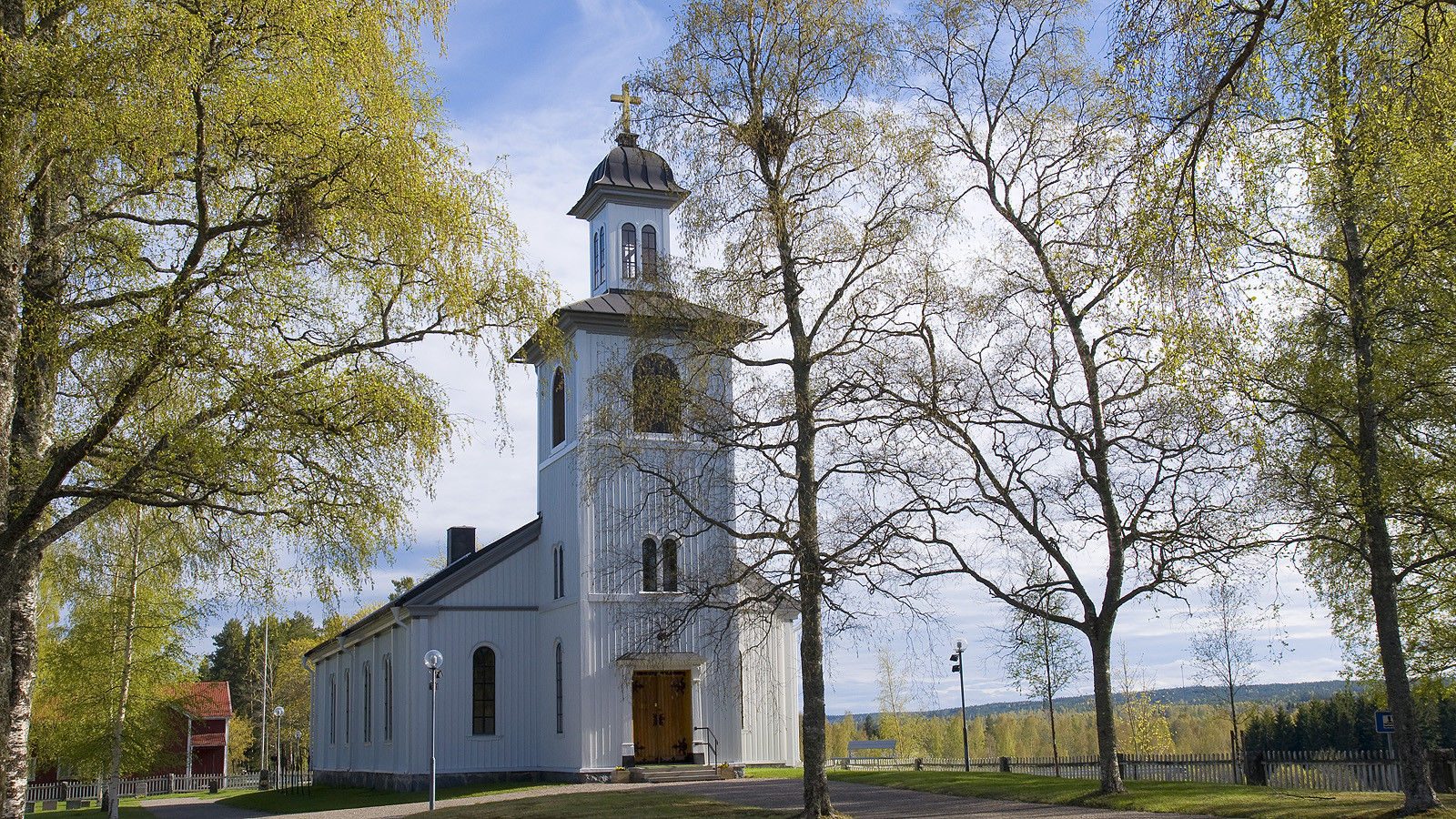

- Location within Sweden Gävleborg Location within Sweden
- Coordinates: 61°03′N 16°41′E
- Country: Sweden
- Province: Hälsingland
- County: Gävleborg County
- Municipality: Ockelbo Municipality

Area
  - Total: 2.51 km^{2} (0.97 sq mi)

Population (31 December 2010)
  - Total: 429
  - Density: 171/km^{2} (440/sq mi)
- Time zone: UTC+1 (CET)
  - Summer (DST): UTC+2 (CEST)

Lingbo is a locality situated in Ockelbo Municipality, Gävleborg County, Sweden with 288 inhabitants in 2020.
