= Brīvā Daugava =

Latvian newspaper

- Language: Latvian

Brīvā Daugava is a regional newspaper published in Latvia.
