= Stars (newspaper) =

Latvian newspaper

- Language: Latvian

Stars (newspaper) is a regional newspaper published in Latvia.
