= Dundadznieks =

Latvian newspaper

Dundadznieks is a regional newspaper published in Latvia. It is the paper of the Dundaga Municipality, replacing Dundagas Pagastas Ziņu.
