= Olaines Avīze =

Latvian newspaper

- Language: Latvian

Olaines Avīze is a regional newspaper published in Latvia.
