= Arodnieks (1920) =

Latvian newspaper

- Type: Weekly, Fortnightly
- Publisher: Central Bureau of Latvian Trade Unions
- Editor-in-chief: Ernests Morics
- Founded: 1920
- Ceased publication: 1934
- Language: Latvian language
- Headquarters: Riga
- Circulation: 2,000-5,000
- Sister newspapers: Trudovaya Zhizn

Arodnieks was a Latvian language newspaper published from Riga, Latvia between 1920 and 1934. The frequency of publication varied from fortnightly to weekly.

The circulation of the newspaper was between 2,000 and 5,000 copies per issue. Initially it was an organ of the Riga trade unions, later it became the organ of the Central Bureau of Latvian Trade Unions (the interwar era predecessor of the Free Trade Union Confederation of Latvia, which was founded in 1990). Ernests Morics served as the editor-in-chief of the newspaper.

Arodnieks had a fortnightly Russian language sister newspaper, Trudovaya Zhizn ('Working Life').
