= Iecavas Ziņas =

Latvian newspaper

- Format: Iecava Municipality Council
- Founded: 24 February 1995
- Ceased publication: 30 June 2021
- Language: Latvian

Iecavas Ziņas was a Latvian local newspaper published by the Iecava Municipality Council for Iecava, and surrounding area, between 24 February 1995 and 30 June 2021. Changes to Latvia's Law on "press and other mass information media" in 2020, banning municipality funded publications presenting themselves as newspapers, caused the end of the paper's publication.
