= Saldus Zeme =

Latvian newspaper

- Language: Latvian

Saldus Zeme is a regional newspaper published in Latvia.
