= Malienas Ziņas =

Latvian newspaper

- Language: Latvian
- Headquarters: Alūksne
- Website: www.malienaszinas.lv

Malienas Ziņas is a regional newspaper published in Latvia.
