= Rēzeknes Vēstis =

- Language: Latvian
- Headquarters: Rēzekne
- Website: rv.lv

Rēzeknes Vēstis is a regional newspaper published in Latvia.
