= Ventas Balss =

Latvian newspaper

- Language: Latvian

Ventas Balss is a regional newspaper published in Latvia.

It published weekly from 1926 to 1940, and was associated with the National Democratic party.

On 16 September 1989, it changed its name to Ventas Voice. It is published in Latvian and Russian.

In 2008, they temporarily suspended internet coverage over a VAT cost issue.
