= Siguldas Elpa =

Latvian newspaper

- Language: Latvian

Siguldas Elpa is a regional newspaper published in Latvia.
