= Ogres Ziņas =

Latvian newspaper

- Language: Latvian

Ogres Ziņas is a regional newspaper published in Latvia. It also is web-hosted in English.
