= Liboyer folksblat =

Jewish newspaper published in Liepaja, Latvia

- Type: Weekly
- Founded: September 8, 1931
- Ceased publication: 1934
- Language: Yiddish language
- Headquarters: Liepāja
- OCLC number: 33955206

Liboyer folksblat (Yiddish: ליבויער פאלקסבלאט, 'Liepāja People's Paper') was a Yiddish language weekly newspaper published from Liepāja, Latvia 1931–1934. The first issue was published on September 8, 1931.
