= Kursas Laiks =

Latvian newspaper

- Language: Latvian

Kursas Laiks is a regional newspaper published in Latvia.
