= 5 min =

Latvian newspaper

- Owner: Dienas mediji
- Founded: 22 August 2005
- Ceased publication: 22 June 2010
- Language: Latvian, Russian
- Circulation: up to 100 000

5 min was a free newspaper published in Latvia.
