= Kurzemnieks =

Regional newspaper published in Kuldiga, Latvia

- Language: Latvian
- Headquarters: Kuldiga
- Website: kurzemnieks.lv

Kurzemnieks is a regional newspaper published in Kuldiga, Latvia.
