= Wesseltoft =

Wesseltoft is a surname. Notable people with the surname include:

- Bugge Wesseltoft (born 1964), Norwegian jazz musician, pianist, composer, and producer
- Erik Wesseltoft (born 1944), Norwegian jazz guitarist and composer, father of Bugge
