= Ya vse znayu =

Russian-language newspaper published in Riga, Latvia

Ya vse znayu (Russian: Я все знаю, 'I know everything') was a non-partisan Russian language newspaper published in Riga in 1932. P. Merkurov was the editor of the newspaper. Only four issues were published.
