= Novadnieks =

Latvian newspaper

- Language: Latvian
- Headquarters: Preiļi
- Website: novadnieks.lv

Novadnieks is a regional newspaper published in Latvia.
