= Ludzas Zeme =

Latvian newspaper

- Language: Latvian
- Headquarters: Ludza
- Website: www.ludzaszeme.lv

Ludzas Zeme was a regional newspaper that was published in Ludza and Ludza Municipality in Latvia. The newspaper was closed in July 2024 due to a lack of financial support from the government. Previously the newspaper, which had been founded in the 1940s, was named Ludzas Taisneiba and Par Komunisma Uzvaru.

The paper also printed a Russian-language version.
