= Bauskas Dzīve =

Latvian newspaper

- Language: Latvian

Bauskas Dzīve is a regional newspaper published in Latvia.
