= Kamf =

Jewish newspaper published in Riga, Latvia

- Kamf masthead
- Publisher: Riga Committee of the Communist Party (Bolsheviks) of Latvia
- Founded: 1 July 1940
- Ceased publication: 12 January 1941
- Political alignment: Communist
- Language: Yiddish language
- City: Riga
- Country: Latvia
- Sister newspapers: Ufboj

Kamf (Yiddish: קאמף, 'Struggle') was a Yiddish language daily newspaper published from Riga, Latvia 1940-1941. It was an organ of the Riga Committee of the Communist Party (Bolsheviks) of Latvia. The first issue of Kamf was published on 1 July 1940.

H. Margolis was the editor of the newspaper. Veteran journalist Max Schatz-Anin was key organizer of the publication. Kamf was intended to have a readership in Jewish communities in all of Latvia. It had an evening edition twice a week. Initially standard Yiddish spelling with Hebrew vocabulary in original shape was used. On 13 July 1940 Kamf began including a weekly youth supplement, which used Yiddishist spellings consistent with Soviet practice.

In October 1940 the circle around Kamf launched the political-literary journal Ufboj. The last issue of Kamf was published on 12 January 1941, the day of the by-election of Latvian delegates to the Supreme Soviet of the Soviet Union. A total of 168 issues of Kamf were published. Ufboj came to replace Kamf as the Communist Party Yiddish-language newspaper.
