= Novaya Gazeta (Latvia) =

Latvian newspaper

- Founded: 6 January 1993
- Language: Russian
- Circulation: 16000
- Website: novaja.lv

Novaya Gazeta (Russian: «Новая газета», lit. 'New Gazette', pronounced [ˈnovəjə ɡɐˈzʲetə]) is a Latvian regional newspaper based in Jelgava. It was founded in 1993 as the only Russian language publication in the Semigallia region, though it also maintains a Latvian version.
