= Rīgas Apriņķa Avīze =

- Language: Latvian
- Headquarters: Riga
- Website: aprinkis.lv

Rīgas Apriņķa Avīze is a regional newspaper published in Latvia.
