= 1946 Swedish school commission =

The 1946 School Commission (Swedish: 1946 års skolkommission) was appointed in 1945 by the government of Per Albin Hansson in Sweden, and included members such as Alva Myrdal, Elsa Skäringer-Larsson, and Ester Hermansson. It replaced the 1940 School Inquiry. The commission focused on democratic development, proposing a school system divided into lower, middle, and upper secondary stages. Education was to be unified for the first six school years, with certain optional subjects introduced in the seventh and eighth years, and tracking introduced in the ninth year. This was in line with Fridtjuv Berg's idea of a bottenskola (bottom school). In 1948, the commission presented its report, SOU 1948:27.

The School Commission was based on and promoted the influence of pragmatism, John Dewey, and progressive pedagogy in Sweden.

== Background ==
The 1940 School Inquiry (Swedish: 1940 års skolutredning) was appointed in Sweden in 1940 by the then Minister of Ecclesiastical Affairs Gösta Bagge. The purpose was to increase the number of students in higher education in rural areas of Sweden, as well as among low-income groups, such as children from working-class families and farm families. At this time, it was mainly children from high-income families who attended secondary schools. The investigation was succeeded by the 1946 commission.
