= Kandava =

Town in Tukums Municipality, Latvia

- Town
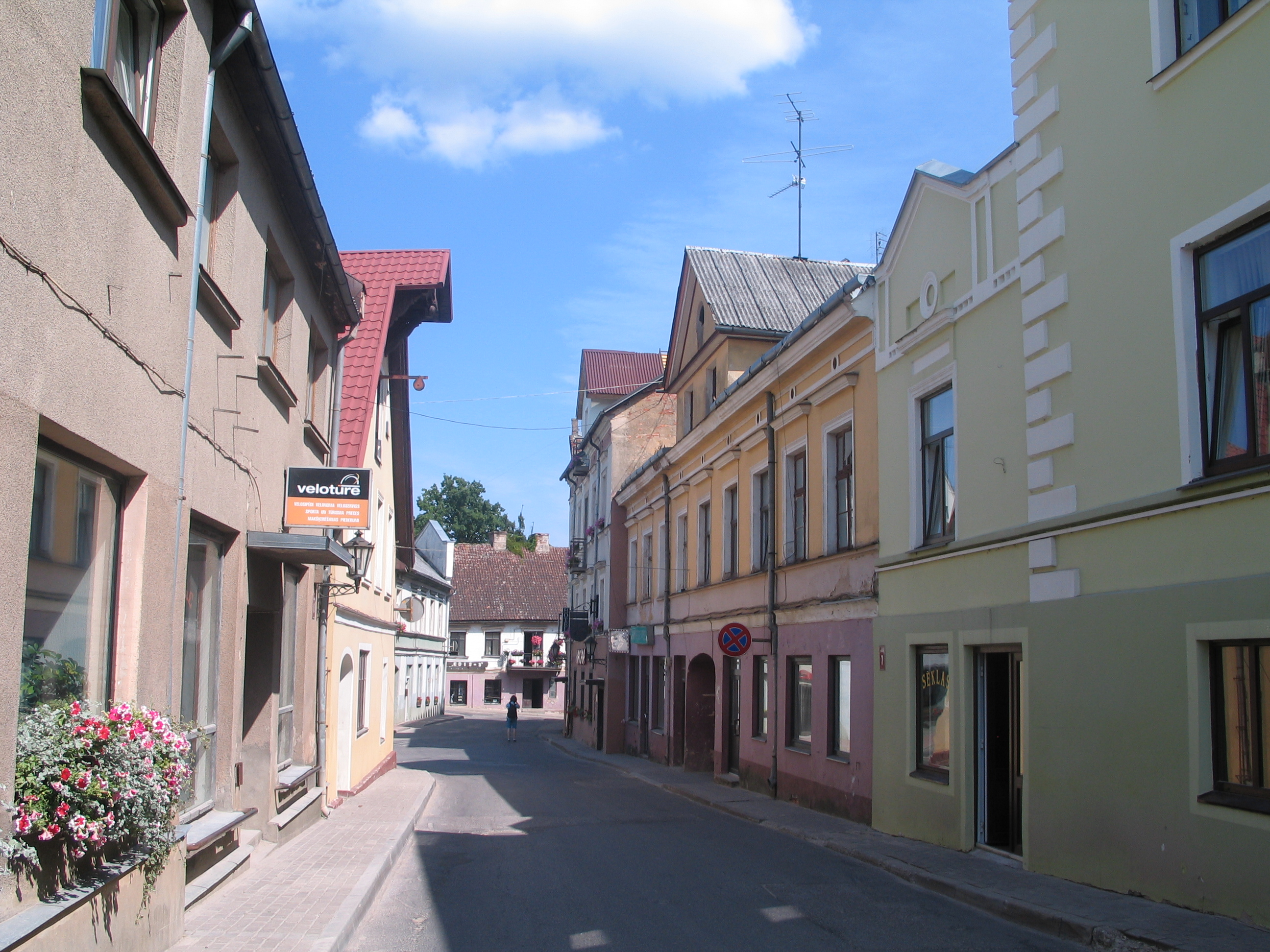
- Street in Kandava

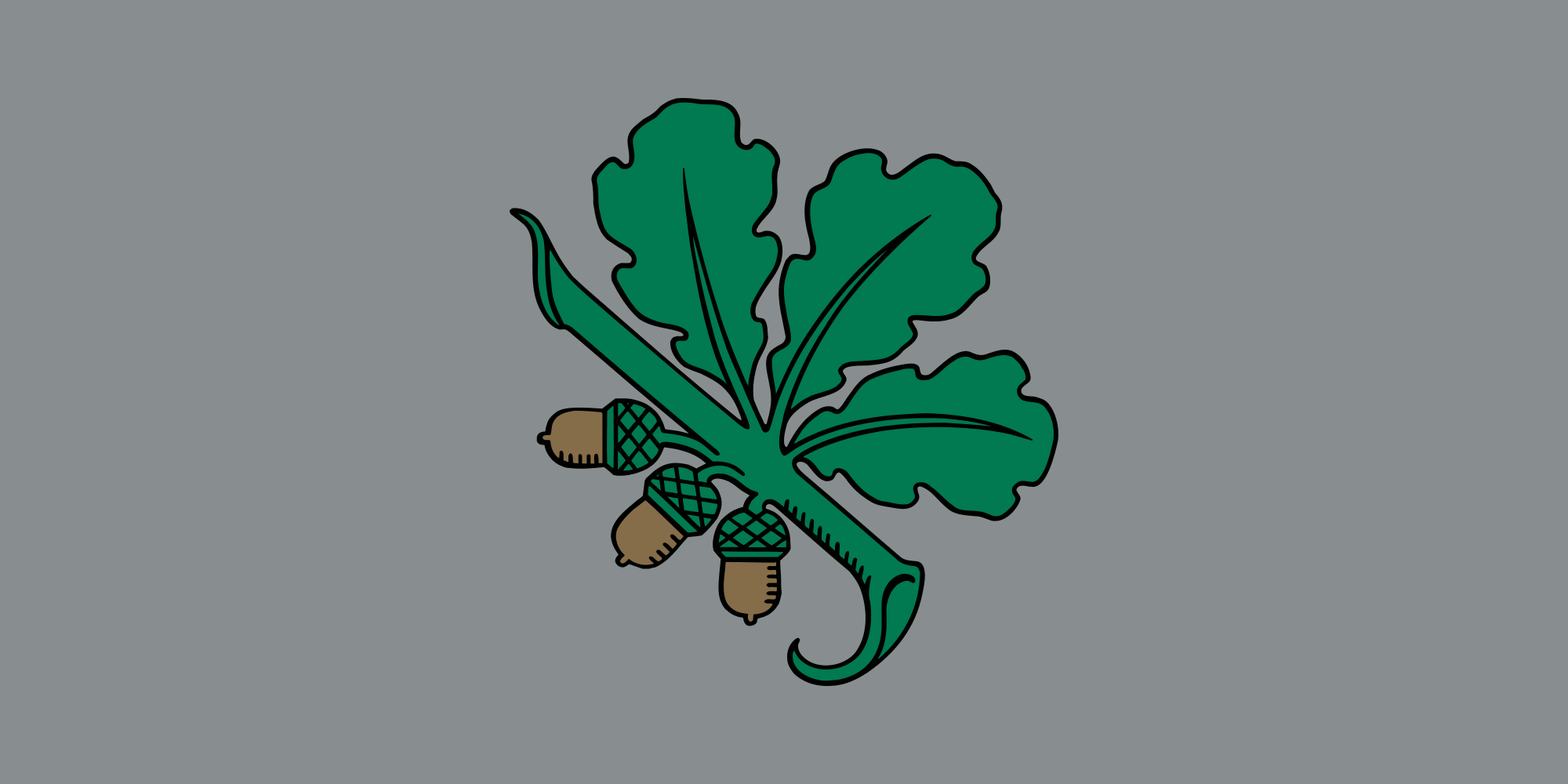
- Flag Coat of arms

- Location in Latvia
- Coordinates: 57°2′N 22°45′E
- Country: Latvia
- District: Tukums Municipality
- Town rights: 1917

Area
  - Total: 9.50 km^{2} (3.67 sq mi)
  - Land: 9.35 km^{2} (3.61 sq mi)
  - Water: 0.15 km^{2} (0.058 sq mi)

Population (2026)
  - Total: 3,180
  - Density: 340/km^{2} (881/sq mi)
- Time zone: UTC+2 (EET)
  - Summer (DST): UTC+3 (EEST)
- Postal code: LV-3120
- Calling code: +371 631
- Number of city council members: 11
- Website: http://www.kandava.lv/

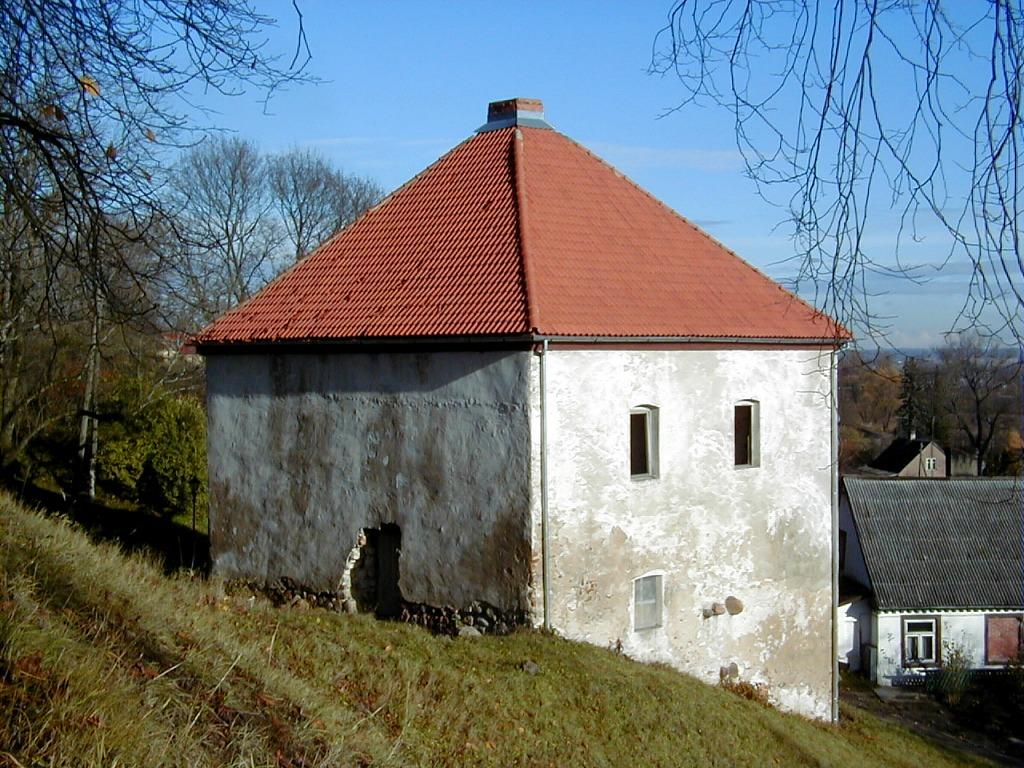
Former guard tower (1334)

Kandava (German: Kandau; Livonian: Kāndav) is a town in Tukums Municipality, in the Courland region of Latvia. It had a population of 3,656 people as of January 2020. The town is also the extra-territorial center of the adjacent Kandava Parish.

== History ==
=== Livonian Crusade ===
The territory of modern Kandava was inhabited by Finnic tribes until the 10th century when Curonian expansion to the north started. The settlement grew around Kandava hillfort which was an important centre in the Curonian land of Vanema. As a settlement (villa Candowe), it is first mentioned in 1230 in a peace treaty between the Livonian Brothers of the Sword, citizens of Riga, and the Curonian residents of the Abava valley. Local residents kept their lands but were forced to accept Christianity, pay annual tribute and participate in crusading campaigns against pagans. However, after several uprisings, a new treaty was signed between Livonian Order and Bishopric of Courland in 1253, and the lands of the Vanema were partitioned. Its southern portion including Kandava became the property of the Livonian Order.

=== Livonian Confederation ===
A military castle was built around 1257, but it was gradually dismantled over the years and now only its foundations can be seen in a town park. The oldest remaining structure is a guard tower built in 1334 and later used for gunpowder storage. In 1312 Kandava castle became the residence of the vogt and administrative centre of the former land of Vanema. In the 16th century, there are churches, schools, and taverns recorded in Kandava.

=== Duchy of Courland and Semigallia ===
In the Duchy of Courland and Semigallia Kandava became the centre of Hauptmannshaft Candau. Kandava received village rights in 1625. During the reign of duke Jacob Kettler, several manufacturers were established around Kandava. In the village there was a flax weaving mill and a gunpowder mill where gunpowder was manufactured from local brimstone and saltpeter. During this period, the population in Kandava reached 1000 people. Further development was stopped by the Second Northern War when Swedes sacked and destroyed Kandava Castle. During the Great Northern War, Swedes again destroyed the castle in 1703. In 1710, a plague epidemic started and of 600 residents, only several craftsmen survived. During the 18th century, Kandava castle lost its military significance. In 1730, two schools were opened in the village, and in 1736, a new church was built.

=== Courland Governorate ===
When the Duchy of Courland and Semigallia were annexed by the Russian Empire in 1795, there were only 439 residents in Kandava. In 1799, Jews were allowed to settle in the village. In 1812, Kandava was occupied for a short period by the army of Napoleon. During the 19th century, Kandava saw rapid development, and in 1892, there were already 2100 residents in the village. As a result, Kandava received limited town rights and its first town council was elected in 1893. In 1904, the Riga - Ventspils railway line was constructed near the town. During the revolution of 1905, Kandava was taken over by a local workers' committee for a month. In 1914, there were 2300 residents in the town and 4000 in the rural territory around it. There were a town school, water mill, power station, a lime kiln, and several sawmills in Kandava. After the start of the First World War, 75% of the town population fled from the advancing German army to Vidzeme or further east into Russia. However, during the German occupation, Kandava was granted full town rights in 1917.

=== Later history ===
During the Latvian War of Independence, Kandava was occupied by the Red Army and later by the Baltic German Landeswehr. In 1920, there were 1045 residents in Kandava. During the 1920s and 1930s there was a post office, a telephone exchange, a court, and two primary schools in Kandava. After the Second World War, Kandava became part of the Latvian SSR. A technical school of agriculture was established in the town in 1945. In 1963, a branch of the Riga Radio factory was established in the town. Today, Kandava counts several woodworking enterprises.

Botanist Theophil Joachim Heinrich Bienert was born in Kandava.

== Twin towns – sister cities ==
Kandava is a member of the Charter of European Rural Communities, a town twinning association across the European Union, along with:

Charter of European Rural Communities

- Bienvenida, Spain
- Bièvre, Belgium
- Bucine, Italy
- (Republic of Ireland) Cashel, Ireland
- Cissé, France
- Desborough, England, United Kingdom
- Esch (Haaren), Netherlands
- Hepstedt, Germany
- Ibănești, Romania
- Kannus, Finland
- Kolindros, Greece
- Lassee, Austria
- Medzev, Slovakia
- Næstved, Denmark
- Nagycenk, Hungary
- Nadur, Malta
- Ockelbo, Sweden
- Pano Lefkara, Cyprus
- Põlva, Estonia
- Samuel (Soure), Portugal
- Starý Poddvorov, Czech Republic
- Strzyżów, Poland
- Svoge, Bulgaria
- Tisno, Croatia
- Troisvierges, Luxembourg
- Žagarė (Joniškis), Lithuania

== Gallery ==
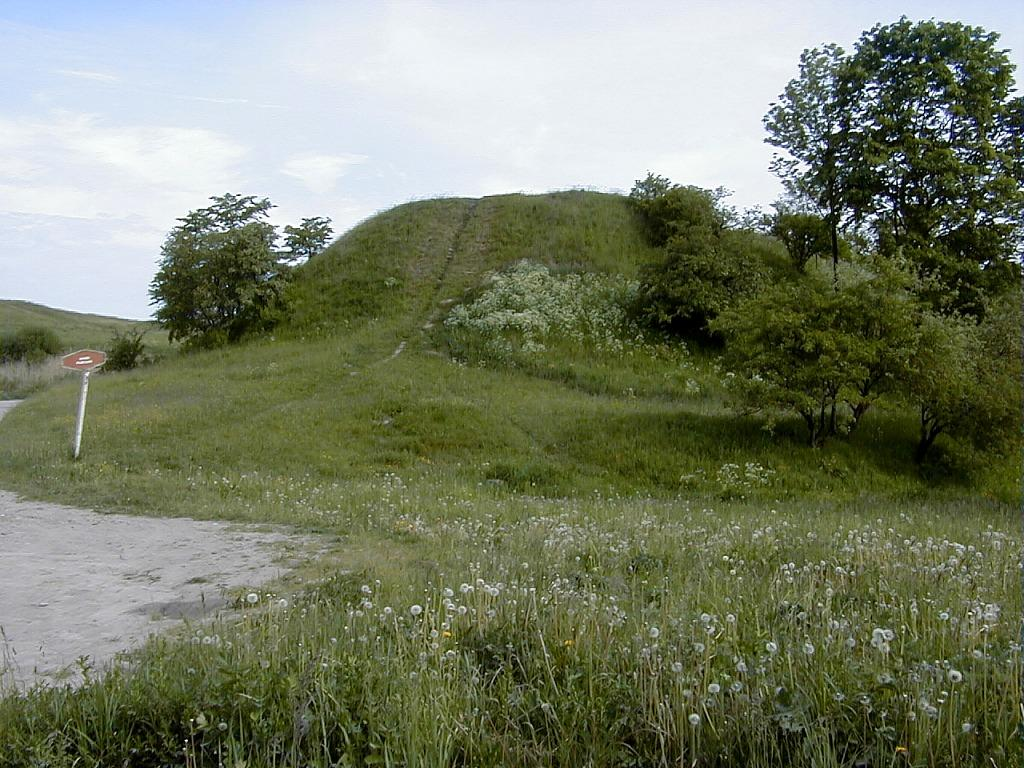
Curonian hillfort in the town

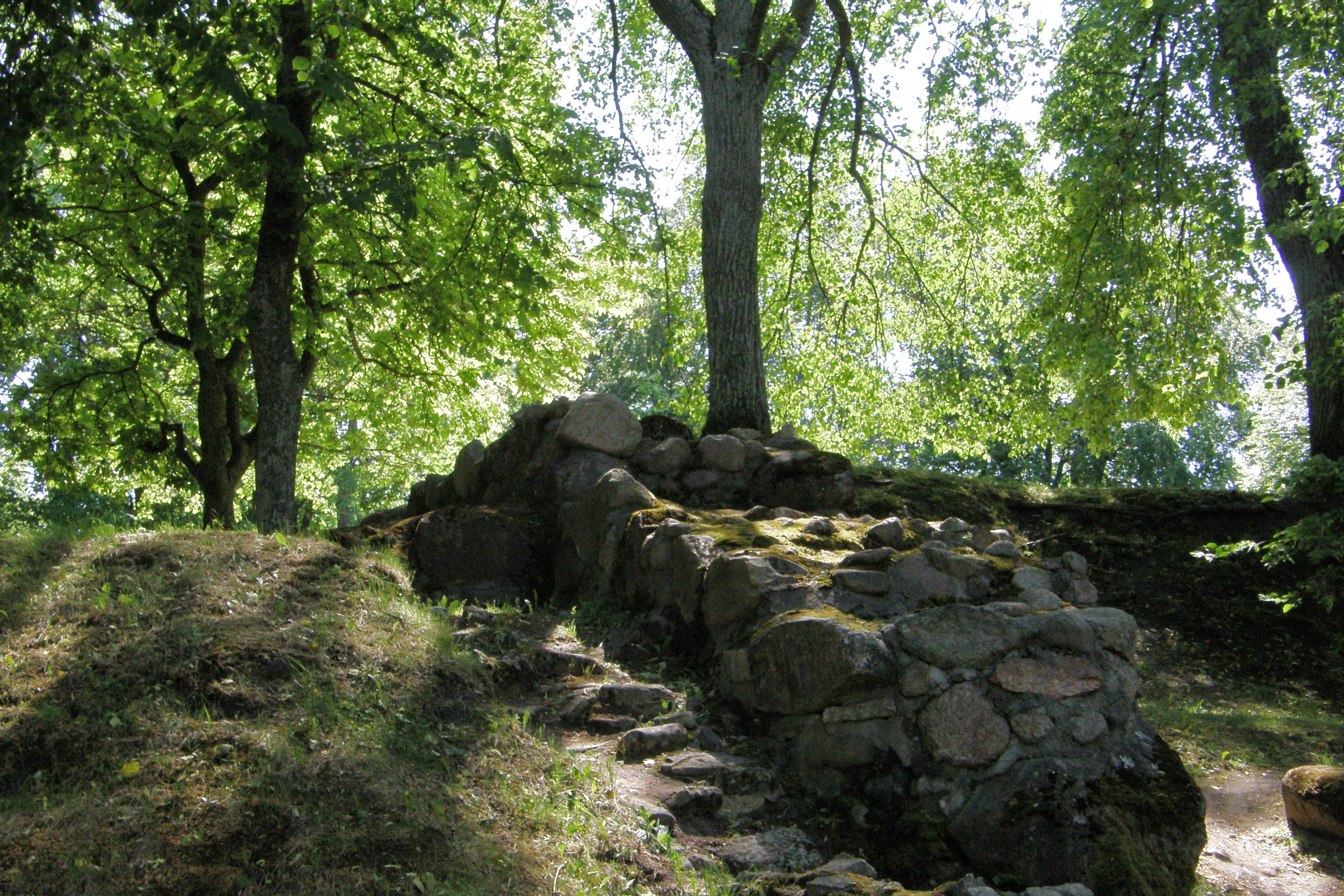
Ruins of the Ordensburg Kandau

== See also ==
- List of cities in Latvia
