= Ockelbo Municipality =

Ockelbo Municipality Ockelbo kommun
- Municipality
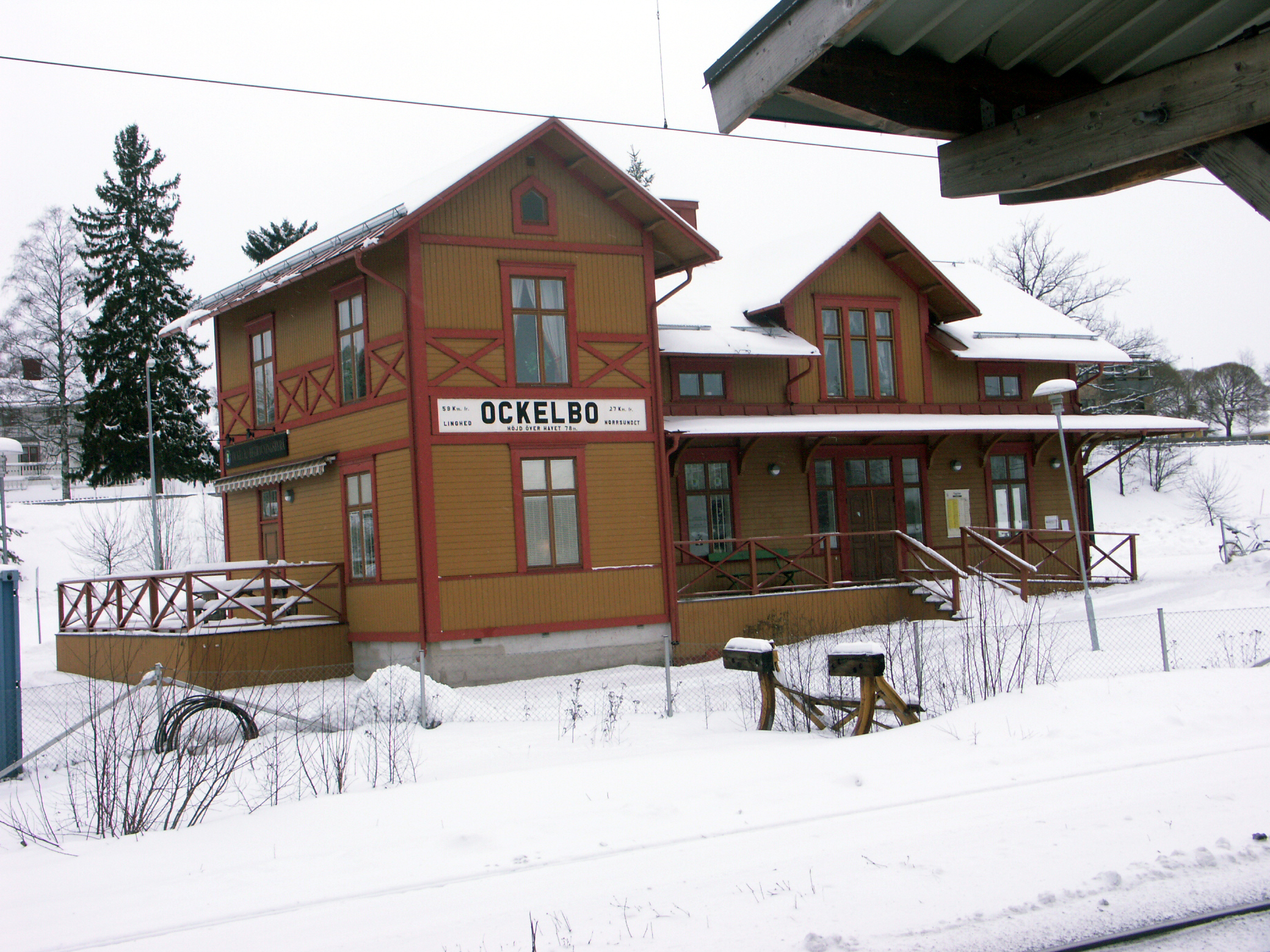
- Ockelbo Railway Station

- Coat of arms

- Coordinates: 60°53′N 16°43′E
- Country: Sweden
- County: Gävleborg County
- Seat: Ockelbo

Area
  - Total: 1,129.04 km^{2} (435.92 sq mi)
  - Land: 1,064.97 km^{2} (411.19 sq mi)
  - Water: 64.07 km^{2} (24.74 sq mi)
- Area as of 1 January 2014.

Population (30 June 2025)
  - Total: 5,709
  - Density: 5.361/km^{2} (13.88/sq mi)
- Time zone: UTC+1 (CET)
  - Summer (DST): UTC+2 (CEST)
- ISO 3166 code: SE
- Province: Gästrikland
- Municipal code: 2101
- Website: www.ockelbo.se

Ockelbo Municipality (Swedish: Ockelbo kommun) is a municipality in Gävleborg County, in east central Sweden. Its seat is located in Ockelbo.

The present municipality was formed in 1971 through the amalgamation of "old" Ockelbo with Skog.

== Localities ==
- Lingbo
- Ockelbo (seat)
- Jädraås
- Åmot

== Demographics ==
This is a demographic table based on Ockelbo Municipality's electoral districts in the 2022 Swedish general election sourced from SVT's election platform, in turn taken from SCB official statistics.

In total there were 5,860 residents, including 4,549 Swedish citizens of voting age. 49.1% voted for the left coalition and 49.9% for the right coalition. Indicators are in percentage points except population totals and income.

Location	Residents	Citizen adults	Left vote	Right vote	Employed	Swedish parents	Foreign heritage	Income SEK	Degree
Location			%	%					
Ockelbo Byar	1,916	1,595	47.7	51.5	79	89	11	22,909	26
Ockelbo N	1,727	1,214	47.1	52.2	79	77	23	23,294	27
Ockelbo S	2,217	1,740	52.4	46.2	78	85	15	21,743	27
Source: SVT
