= Tukuma Ziņotājs =

Latvian newspaper

- Language: Latvian

Tukuma Ziņotājs is a regional newspaper published in Latvia.
