= Åmot, Sweden =

Åmot
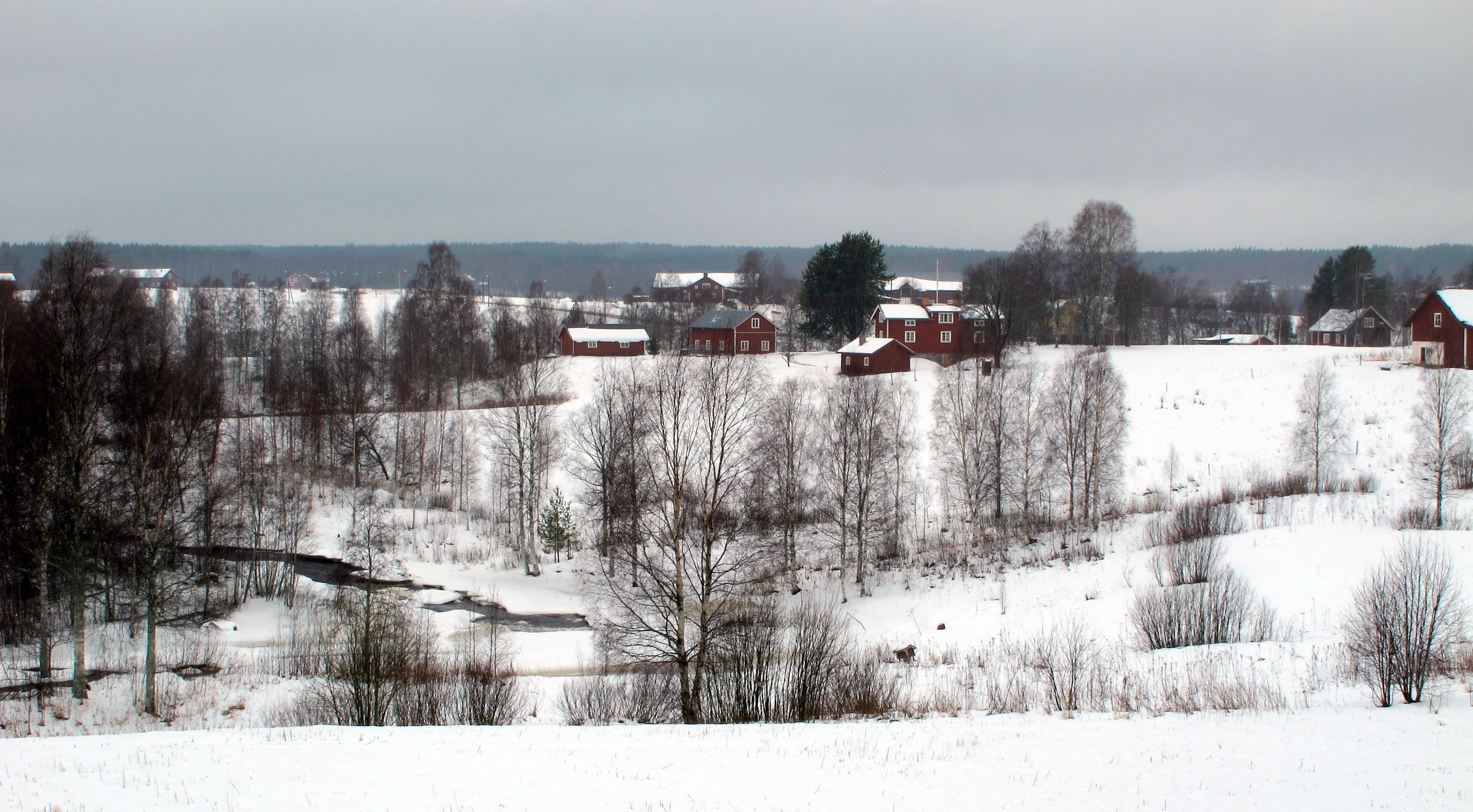

- Location within Sweden Gävleborg Location within Sweden
- Coordinates: 60°58′N 16°27′E
- Country: Sweden
- Province: Gästrikland
- County: Gävleborg County
- Municipality: Ockelbo Municipality

Area
  - Total: 1.44 km^{2} (0.56 sq mi)

Population (31 December 2010)
  - Total: 277
  - Density: 192/km^{2} (500/sq mi)
- Time zone: UTC+1 (CET)
  - Summer (DST): UTC+2 (CEST)

Åmot is a locality situated in Ockelbo Municipality, Gävleborg County, Sweden with 277 inhabitants in 2010.

== Climate ==
Åmot has a climate in the boundary zone between continental and subarctic.

Climate data for Åmot 2002–2021 (extremes since 1951)
Month	Jan	Feb	Mar	Apr	May	Jun	Jul	Aug	Sep	Oct	Nov	Dec	Year
Record high °C (°F)	9.4 (48.9)	12.3 (54.1)	17.7 (63.9)	25.6 (78.1)	29.4 (84.9)	31.0 (87.8)	32.3 (90.1)	32.6 (90.7)	27.0 (80.6)	21.0 (69.8)	15.5 (59.9)	11.8 (53.2)	32.6 (90.7)
Mean maximum °C (°F)	5.3 (41.5)	6.8 (44.2)	12.4 (54.3)	17.8 (64.0)	23.3 (73.9)	26.7 (80.1)	28.1 (82.6)	26.6 (79.9)	21.3 (70.3)	14.9 (58.8)	10.3 (50.5)	6.4 (43.5)	29.4 (84.9)
Mean daily maximum °C (°F)	−1.6 (29.1)	−0.2 (31.6)	3.9 (39.0)	9.9 (49.8)	15.2 (59.4)	19.5 (67.1)	21.9 (71.4)	20.1 (68.2)	15.4 (59.7)	8.6 (47.5)	3.3 (37.9)	0.0 (32.0)	9.7 (49.4)
Daily mean °C (°F)	−5.4 (22.3)	−4.4 (24.1)	−1.2 (29.8)	3.8 (38.8)	8.8 (47.8)	12.2 (54.0)	15.7 (60.3)	14.3 (57.7)	10.1 (50.2)	4.4 (39.9)	0.1 (32.2)	−3.5 (25.7)	4.6 (40.2)
Mean daily minimum °C (°F)	−9.2 (15.4)	−8.6 (16.5)	−6.3 (20.7)	−2.3 (27.9)	2.4 (36.3)	6.9 (44.4)	9.4 (48.9)	8.4 (47.1)	4.7 (40.5)	0.2 (32.4)	−3.1 (26.4)	−7.0 (19.4)	−0.4 (31.3)
Mean minimum °C (°F)	−22.2 (−8.0)	−22.0 (−7.6)	−17.9 (−0.2)	−9.2 (15.4)	−4.7 (23.5)	−0.1 (31.8)	3.1 (37.6)	0.6 (33.1)	−3.0 (26.6)	−8.8 (16.2)	−13.5 (7.7)	−18.5 (−1.3)	−25.5 (−13.9)
Record low °C (°F)	−32.5 (−26.5)	−35.5 (−31.9)	−31.3 (−24.3)	−23.6 (−10.5)	−12.7 (9.1)	−3.4 (25.9)	0.1 (32.2)	−2.5 (27.5)	−7.8 (18.0)	−17.6 (0.3)	−25.6 (−14.1)	−31.8 (−25.2)	−35.5 (−31.9)
Average precipitation mm (inches)	42.1 (1.66)	27.6 (1.09)	24.4 (0.96)	24.3 (0.96)	45.1 (1.78)	63.0 (2.48)	74.0 (2.91)	89.4 (3.52)	42.1 (1.66)	62.3 (2.45)	45.8 (1.80)	42.8 (1.69)	582.9 (22.96)
Source 1: SMHI Open Data for Åmot A, temperature
Source 2: SMHI Open Data for Åmot A, precipitation
