= Governorate of Livonia =

1796–1918 unit of Russia

Livonia Governorate: Лифля́ндская губе́рния (Russian); Vidzemes guberņa (Latvian); Liivimaa kubermang (Estonian); Livländisches Gouvernement (German)
- Governorate
- Coat of arms

- Location in the Russian Empire
- Country: Russian Empire
- Established: 1796
- Treaty of Brest-Litovsk: 1918
- Capital: Riga

Area
  - Total: 47,030.87 km^{2} (18,158.72 sq mi)
- Highest elevation (Suur Munamägi): 318 m (1,043 ft)

Population (1897)
  - Total: 1,299,365
  - Density: 27.62792/km^{2} (71.55598/sq mi)
  - Urban: 29.31%
  - Rural: 70.69%

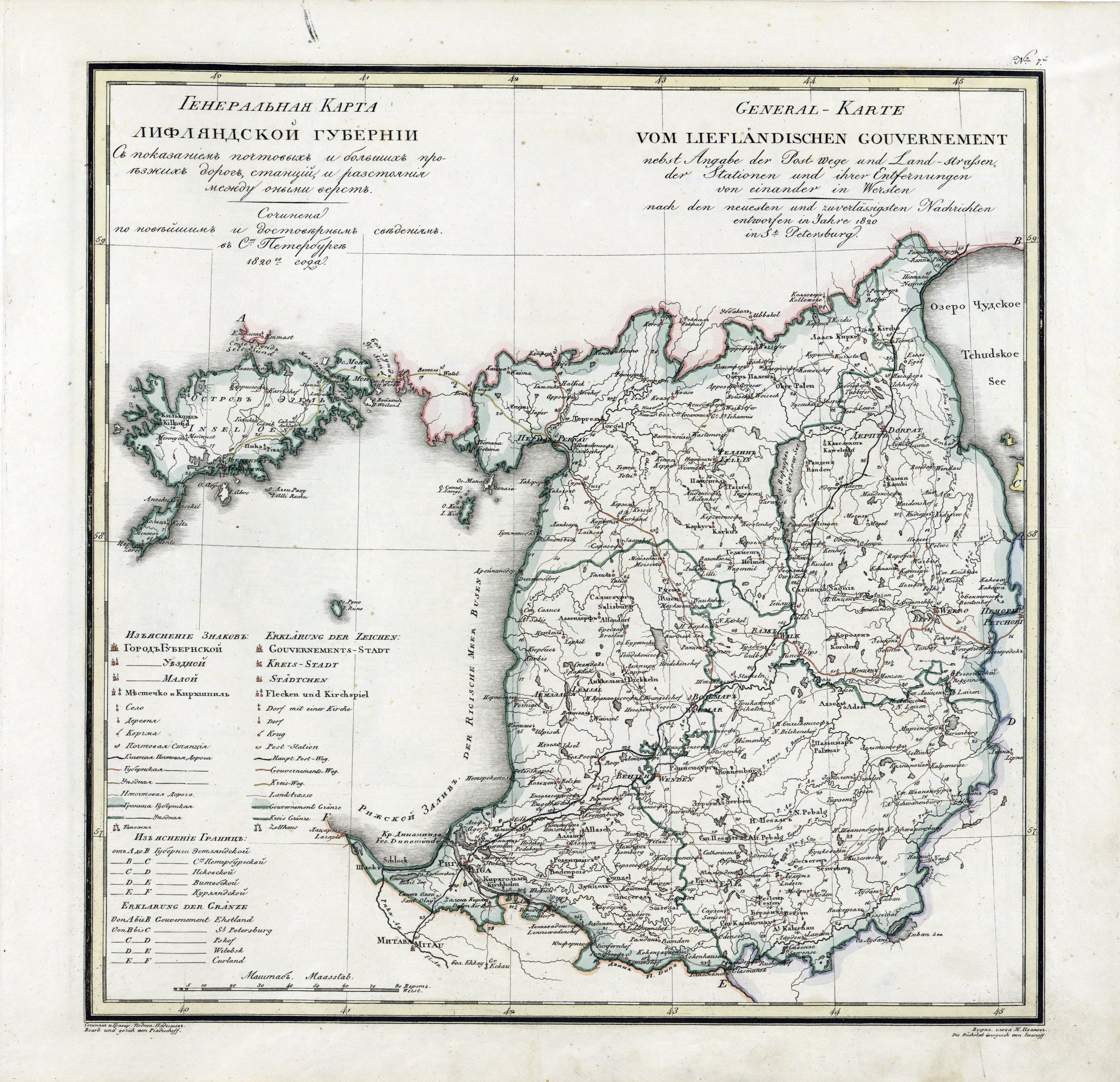
Map of the Governorate of Livonia (1820)

The Livonia Governorate (Note: Russian: Лифля́ндская губе́рния, romanized: Liflyandskaya guberniya; German: Livländisches Gouvernement, lit. 'Livland Government'; Latvian: Vidzemes guberņa or Līvzemes guberņa; Estonian: Liivimaa kubermang) was a province (guberniya) and one of the Baltic governorates of the Russian Empire, part of the Baltic Governorate-General until 1876. The Livonia Governorate bordered the Estonia Governorate to the north, Saint Petersburg and Pskov Governorates to the east, Vitebsk Governorate and Courland Governorate to the south, and the Gulf of Riga to the west. In 1897, the population of the governorate was 1,299,365, and it had an area of 47,030.87 square kilometres (18,158.72 mi^{2}). The administrative centre of the governorate was the Baltic Sea port of Riga. It roughly corresponded to the modern Vidzeme region of Latvia and southern Estonia.

Originally established in 1713 as the Riga Governorate following the Russian conquest of Swedish Livonia in the Great Northern War, the territory was reorganized as the Riga Viceroyalty in 1783 and reconstituted as the Governorate of Livonia in 1796. Until the late 19th century, the province retained substantial local autonomy administered by the Baltic German nobility through the Livonian Landtag. Serfdom was abolished in 1819. Following the February Revolution in 1917, the northern Estonian-majority counties were merged into the Autonomous Governorate of Estonia. Following German occupation in late 1917 and the Treaty of Brest-Litovsk in 1918, Russian rule ended, with the territory later partitioned between independent Latvia and Estonia.

== History ==
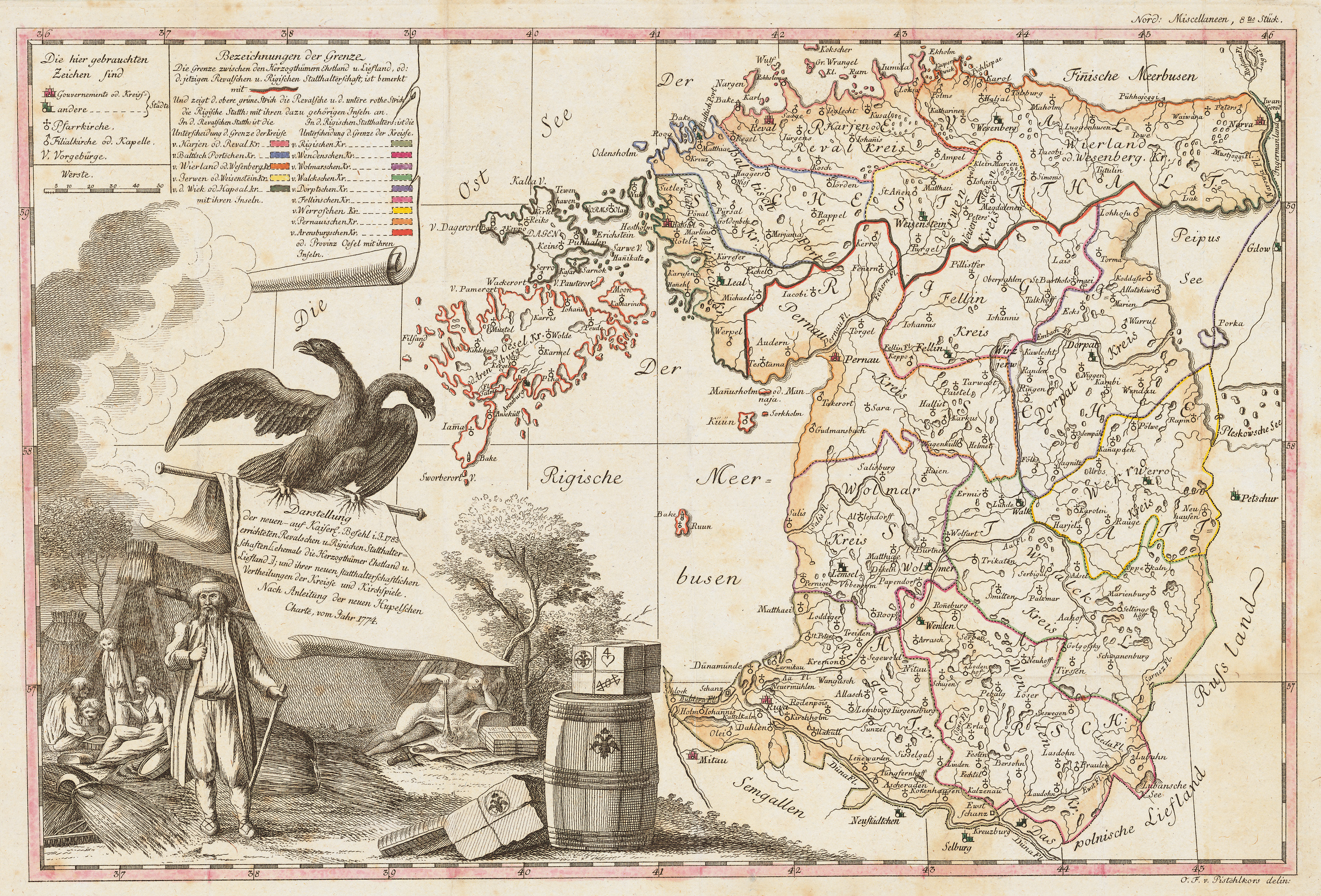
Map of Riga and Reval Lieutenancies, 1783

Following the capitulation of Estonia and Livonia in 1710, Peter the Great, on 28 July 1713, created the Riga Governorate (Russian: Рижская губерния) which also included Smolensk uezd, Dorogobuzh uezd, Roslavl uezd and Vyazma uezd of Smolensk Governorate. Smolensk Governorate was created from territory in Smolensk Governorate at that time. It was incorporated into Smolensk Governorate when it was reformed in 1726.

Sweden formally ceded Swedish Livonia to Russia in 1721 with the Treaty of Nystad. In 1722 Dorpat County (Estonian: Tartumaa) was added to Riga Governorate. In 1726 Smolensk Governorate was separated from the governorate, which now had five provinces: Riga, Wenden, Dorpat, Pernau and Ösel. In 1783 the Schlock County was added. On 3 July 1783 Catherine the Great reorganized the governorate into the Riga Viceroyalty. In 1796, under Paul I's reforms, the territory was reconstituted as the Governorate of Livonia.

Until the late 19th century the governorate was not ruled by Russian laws but was administered autonomously by the local German Baltic nobility through a feudal Landtag (Livonian Diet). German nobles insisted on preserving their privileges and use of the German language. In 1819 the serfs of Livonia were liberated by Tsar Alexander I, in a precursor to his plans for the rest of Russia.

After the Russian February Revolution in 1917, the northern part of the Governorate of Livonia was combined with the Governorate of Estonia to form a new Autonomous Governorate of Estonia. In September 1917, Riga was occupied by German troops during World War I. On December 14, 1917, the Bolshevik government of Soviet Russia ruled that Daugavpils, Ludza and Rēzekne counties should be separated from the Vitebsk Governorate and united with Vidzeme, which by then was under control of the Bolshevik Iskolat.

After the Treaty of Brest-Litovsk on 12 April 1918, a Provincial Assembly (Vereinigter Landesrat), composed of 35 Baltic Germans, 13 Estonians, and 11 Latvians, passed a resolution calling upon the German Emperor to recognise the Baltic provinces as a monarchy and to make them a German protectorate. In agreements concluded in Berlin on 27 August 1918, Soviet Russia accepted the loss of the Autonomous Governorate of Estonia and the Governorate of Livonia.

The United Baltic Duchy was nominally recognised as a sovereign state by Wilhelm II on 22 September 1918. On 5 November 1918, a temporary Regency Council (Regentschaftsrat) for the new state, led by Baron Adolf Pilar von Pilchau, was formed on a joint basis from both local Land Councils.

== Geography ==
The province was fairly rectangular in shape, with a maximum length of 246 versts (262 km) and a width of 198 versts (211 km). Its borders were the Governorate of Estonia to the north, Lake Peipus and the strait connecting it with Lake Pskov to the east, the Governorate of Pskov and Vitebsk to the southeast, the Governorate of Courland to the south, and the Gulf of Riga to the west. The length of the western border (the seacoast) was 280 versts (299 km). The area of the Livonian province (according to Strelbitsky) was 41,325.4 square versts (47,030.87 km^{2}).

=== Geological structure ===
Geologically the Livonian province and the islands belong to the Silurian, Devonian and modern diluvial systems. The Silurian is spread in the northernmost part of the gubernia and on the islands and consists of dolomites, marls, limestones and sandstones. In the rest of Livonia the Devonian system of limestones, dolomites, clays with gypsum, marls, sandstones and sands is spread under diluvial deposits, while the sandstone layer is remarkable for its caves. The middle layer of the Devonian system, made up of dolomites, limestone and clay with gypsum and marl, is spread in the southern part of the province. Between the rivers Zedde (Seda) through the Abza and Ogre to the Daugava, sandstones, sands, clay and marl form the upper tier of the Devonian system with a predominance of fish fossils. The coastal formations and the erratic boulders covering its surface belong to the latest diluvial system: under the former there are calcareous tuffs, peaty marls and marshy iron ores; among the erratic boulders, crystalline rocks (gneiss, granites, syenites, diorites and porphyries) prevail.

=== Uplands ===
The continuation of the Estonian uplands forms in the Livland province a wide plateau up to 121 m in height, the middle of which transitions into the Võrtsjärv lowland, while its edges divide into two branches: the Fellin branch, which forms the western watershed of the province, and the eastern branch, which forms the watershed between Lake Võrtsjärv and Lake Peipus. The first, reaching a height of 133 m, stretches east to the river Gauja and south to Limbaži. Here it is called the Lemsal Plateau; on it is the "Blue Mountain" (Latvian: Zilaiskalns, German: Blauberg), once considered sacred and continuing to enjoy special respect among Latvians. The second branch is cut by the river Emajõgi, to the south of which it is called the Otepää Upland. Near Arula, a plateau terrace rises amidst the lowlands to Mount Kuutsemägi (up to 217 m). The highest plateau of the province (Haanja Upland in Estonia and Alūksne Upland in Latvia) stretches south from the town of Werro (Võru), descending to Lake Alūksne; its southwestern spurs connect with the Vidzeme Upland, between the rivers Gauja, Aiviekste and Daugava. In the Haanja Upland lies the highest point of the region, Suur Munamägi (318 m); nearby is Vella-Mägi (228 m). To the southeast, the plateau continues toward the Pskov and Vitebsk provinces.

The Vidzeme Upland is dotted with hundreds of lakes and forms a very picturesque area. The highest point here is Mount Gaiziņkalns (312 m). The slopes to the Gauja River near Sigulda, Turaida, Krimulda and the banks of the Daugava near Sēlpils and Koknese were noted for their picturesque castle ruins. On the Piebalga heights are the sources of the Gauja River and many tributaries of the Daugava. Wooded and richly irrigated lowlands of the province are located along the shores of Lake Peipus, around Lake Võrtsjärv, along the shores of the Gulf of Riga, and along the basins of the Pärnu, Salaca, Gauja and Daugava rivers. Dunes stretch along the coast of the Gulf of Riga, of which the largest, near Gutmansbach, reaches 129 m in height. The main island belonging to the province, Saaremaa (Ösel), features flat limestone ridges and northern coastal cliffs (clints), surrounded by islets such as Abruka and Vilsandi, as well as Ruhnu in the Gulf of Riga.

=== Water ===
The province of Livonia was rich in water: in the west it was washed by the Gulf of Riga and drained by more than 300 rivers and streams, with up to 1,000 lakes, more than half of which were located in Cēsis County. Lake Peipus in the east washed the province for over 110 versts (117 km); in the centre of the province lay the inland basin of Lake Võrtsjärv, alongside lakes Burtnieks, Lubāns, and Lake Alūksne. The Gulf of Riga provided two major harbours accessible to large ships: Riga at the mouth of the Daugava River and Pärnu at the mouth of the Pärnu River. On the islands, Kuressaare (Arensburg) offered a convenient roadstead. The main islands of the province (Saaremaa, Muhu, Ruhnu) were separated from the mainland and neighbouring islands by the Suur väin (Moon Sound) and Väike väin. The river systems belonged to the Baltic Sea basin, including the navigable Pärnu with its tributaries Navesti, Halliste and Reiu; the Salaca River, flowing from Lake Burtnieks; the Gauja; and the Daugava River, which bordered the province on its right bank for 138 versts (147 km). In the north, the Great Emajõgi connected Lake Võrtsjärv with Lake Peipus as a key navigable waterway.

=== Soil ===
The soil was generally composed of sand, clay, marl, and loam, with peat bogs and marshy soils in the lowlands. Erratic boulders reached up to 20 feet (6.1 m) in diameter, predominantly rounded by glacial action.

=== Forests ===
Pernau County was largely covered by forests, extending into adjoining parts of Fellin County and southward along the Pärnu river basin to the Gulf of Riga. Extensive woodlands also covered parts of Riga and Wenden counties along the Aiviekste river basin. The island of Ösel was the least forested part of the province.

The principal tree species were Norway spruce and Scots pine (used for ship timber), alongside birch, alder, ash, oak, and willow. Modern forestry management and artificial reforestation expanded in the late 19th century, particularly within state forests covering over 210,000 dessiatinas (2,294 km^{2}).

=== Swamps ===
Lowland bogs and peatlands covered significant areas of the province along Lake Peipus, the Gulf of Riga, and the major river valleys. Moss bogs and peat bogs (Hochmoor) were most prevalent in Pernau and Fellin counties, and least common in Wenden and Ösel counties. Drainage projects throughout the 19th century steadily reduced the area occupied by wetlands. In total, bogs covered approximately 360,000 dessiatinas (3,933 km^{2}), or roughly one-tenth of the governorate's total surface.

== Law ==
The courts consisted of the Livländisches Hofgericht (Livonian Court of Appeal, the highest provincial court), the Landgericht (Courts of Appeal), the Ordnungsgericht (Courts of First Instance) for the nobility, the county court (Kreisgericht) for the peasantry, the volost court (Gemeindegericht) and the parish court (Kirchspielgericht) for the peasantry as the lowest level of the judicial system.

== Administrative division ==
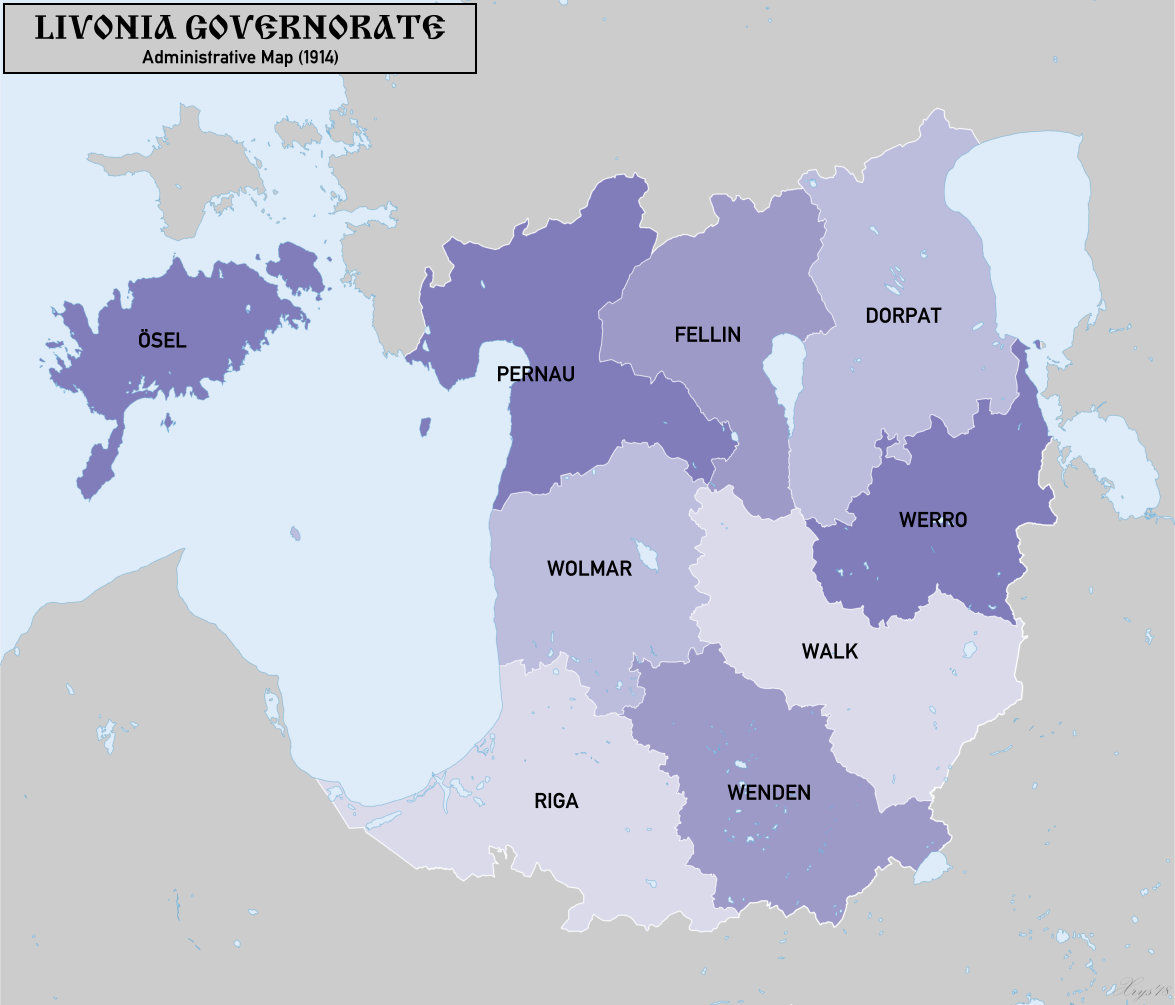
Administrative divisions of the Governorate of Livonia (as of 1914)

The Governorate of Livonia was divided into 9 uezds ("counties").

County		Administrative centre		Arms of county town	Area	Population (1897 census)
Name in German	Name in Russian	Town	Town pop. (1897)	Arms of county town	Area	Population (1897 census)
Walk	Валкский	Walk (Valka)	10,922		6,030.2 km^{2} (2,328.3 sq mi)	120,585
Wenden	Венденский	Wenden (Cēsis)	6,356		5,637.6 km^{2} (2,176.7 sq mi)	124,208
Werro	Верроский	Werro (Võru)	4,152		4,261.1 km^{2} (1,645.2 sq mi)	97,185
Wolmar	Вольмарский	Wolmar (Valmiera)	5,050		4,959.7 km^{2} (1,915.0 sq mi)	112,836
Pernau	Перновский	Pernau (Pärnu)	12,898		5,343 km^{2} (2,063 sq mi)	98,123
Riga	Рижский	Riga	282,230		6,223.3 km^{2} (2,402.8 sq mi)	396,101
Fellin	Феллинский	Fellin (Viljandi)	7,736		4,569.5 km^{2} (1,764.3 sq mi)	99,747
Ösel	Эзельский	Arensburg (Kuressaare)	4,603		2,862.7 km^{2} (1,105.3 sq mi)	60,263
Dorpat	Юрьевский	Dorpat / Yuryev (Tartu)	42,308		7,143.2 km^{2} (2,758.0 sq mi)	190,317

The uezds were divided into uchastoks ("subcounties"), which were supervised by assistant chiefs of the district. Each uchastok had two upper peasant court districts, with the exception of the Ezelsky uezd, which had only one uchastok.

There were 17 uchastok commissioners in the counties, subordinate to the Livonian Peasant Affairs Commission.

The Livonian province was divided into five judicial districts: the districts of Riga-Volmar, Venden-Valk, Jurjev-Verro, Pernov-Fellini, and Ezel. There were 42 electoral districts.

The representative bodies of the volosts were the volost assemblies (Gemeindeversammlung), which consisted of all the taxpayers in the volost, or elected assemblies, elected by the taxpayers in the volost; the executive of the volost was the volost foreman.

After the February Revolution the Russian Provisional Government issued a decree on 30 March 1917 "On the autonomy of Estland", according to which the Government of Livonia was divided: five northern counties (Kreis) with an Estonian majority (Dorpat, Pernau, Fellin, Werro and Ösel) as well as Estonian-inhabited townships of Walk county were transferred to the neighboring Estonia Governorate.

== Demographics ==
The bulk of the population were former landlord peasants, who were mainly engaged in arable farming and cattle breeding. In 1819 they were freed from serfdom, and the right to purchase peasant land was granted in 1849.

=== Russian Empire census (1897) ===
According to the Russian Empire Census of 1897, the Livonia Governorate had a population of 1,299,365, including 629,992 men and 669,373 women. The largest segment of the population indicated Latvian to be their mother tongue, with significant Estonian, German, and Russian speaking minorities.

Linguistic composition of the Livonia Governorate in 1897
Language	Male	Female	Native speakers	%
Latvian	271,215	292,714	563,929	43.40
Estonian	247,348	271,246	518,594	39.91
German	44,770	53,803	98,573	7.59
Russian	38,844	29,280	68,124	5.24
Jewish	12,189	11,539	23,728	1.83
Polish	8,321	6,811	15,132	1.16
Lithuanian	4,131	2,463	6,594	0.51
Belarusian	699	153	852	0.07
Ukrainian	555	83	638	0.05
Romani	271	224	495	0.04
Tatar	428	21	449	0.03
Swedish	223	201	424	0.03
French	98	241	339	0.03
English	158	153	311	0.02
Danish	129	94	223	0.02
Others	654	406	1,060	0.08
Total	629,992	669,373	1,299,365	100.00

Religious composition of the Livonia Governorate in 1897
Faith	Male	Female	Both	
Faith	Male	Female	Number	%
Lutheran	489,237	541,779	1,031,016	79.35
Eastern Orthodox	98,676	89,064	187,740	14.45
Roman Catholic	17,390	13,149	30,539	2.35
Judaism	15,186	14,497	29,683	2.28
Old Believer	7,553	9,224	16,777	1.29
Reformed	698	859	1,557	0.12
Baptist	481	605	1,086	0.08
Muslim	506	30	536	0.04
Anglican	126	85	211	0.02
Karaite	32	56	58	0.00
Armenian Apostolic	39	8	47	0.00
Mennonite	6	9	15	0.00
Armenian Catholic	3	3	6	0.00
Other Christian denomination	36	35	71	0.01
Other non-Christian denomination	23	0	23	0.00
Total	629,992	669,373	1,299,365	100.00

== Climate ==
The climate of the Livonian Province had a more continental character than typical for its coastal Baltic position, influenced by extensive inland marshes and forests. Spring temperatures were subject to sharp fluctuations, and southwesterly winds prevailed. Snow cover was generally deep, with frequent dense fogs along the coastal strip and lowlands.

Average temperatures (°C)
City/Month	January	April	July	October	Annual average
Riga	−5.1	4.7	17.9	6.6	6.0
Yuriyev	−6.7	3.2	17.1	4.7	4.4

Annual precipitation exceeded 500 mm, with higher levels recorded in the southern and western districts than in the north and east; July and the subsequent autumn months were the wettest.

== Economy ==
The regional economy was based on agriculture, trade, shipbuilding, shipping, and fishing. Seal hunting was practiced around Ruhnu and the Sõrve Peninsula.

=== Natural wealth ===
Mineral resources included clay, gypsum, peat, and bog iron found near the Riga mineral springs. The flora was especially diverse around Fellin, Wenden, and on the island of Ösel.

=== Wild animals ===
With expanded land cultivation and forest clearance, larger game decreased over the 19th century. The most common mammals were bears, wolves, elk, foxes, martens and hares. Birds included eagles, falcons, hawks, owls, grouse, and storks on Ösel island.

=== Fisheries ===
The main commercial marine fish were Baltic herring, perch, sturgeon, flounder, and sprat. In lakes and rivers, fishermen caught salmon, lamprey, trout, vendace, whitefish, and crayfish. Lake Peipus supported extensive commercial fisheries, particularly for smelt (snets), which were salted and exported in large quantities.

=== Agriculture ===
Cereal production focused on rye, barley, and some buckwheat. Root crops were widely cultivated, primarily potatoes. Flax and hemp represented major industrial crops. Sown fodder grasses such as clover and timothy grass were widely planted to support livestock farming.

Agriculture reached a high level of development through crop rotation, intensive fertilization, and land drainage. Dairy farming and cheese production expanded significantly toward the late 19th century. In 1888, the province recorded 216,870 horses, 401,498 cattle, 1,020,800 sheep, and 478,649 pigs. The traditional local horse breed, the Estonian klepper, had largely declined, surviving mainly around Fellin, Oberpahlen, and Ösel.

== Governors ==
The Livonian province was governed by a governor appointed by the emperor. The representative body of local nobility self-government was the Landtag, chaired by the Landmarshal, with the executive Landrat College consisting of 12 landrats.

- 1797 Baron Balthasar von Campenhausen
- 1797 Count Ernst Burchard von Mengden
- 1797 – 1808 Christoph Adam von Richter
- 1808 – 1811 Ivan Nikolayevich Repyev
- 1811 – 1827 Joseph Du Hamel
- 1827 – 1829 Baron Paul Theodor von Hahn
- 1829 Johann Ludwig Ferdinand von Cube (acting governor)
- 1829 – 1847 Baron Georg Friedrich von Fölkesahm
- 1847 Johann Ludwig Ferdinand von Cube (acting governor)
- 1847 – 1862 Heinrich Magnus Wilhelm von Essen
- 1862 – 1868 August Georg Friedrich von Oettingen
- 1868 – 1871 Friedrich Woldemar von Lysander
- 1871 – 1872 Julius Gustav von Cube (acting governor)
- 1872 – 1874 Baron Mikhail Egorovich Vrangel
- 1874 – 1882 Baron Alexander Karl Abraham von Uexküll-Güldenband
- 1882 – 1885 Ivan Egorovich Shevich
- 1885 Hermann Friedrich Johannes von Tobiesen (acting governor)
- 1885 – 1895 Mihail Alekseyevich Zinoviev
- 1895 – 1896 Aleksandr Nikolayevich Bulygin (acting governor)
- 1896 – 1900 Vladimir Dmitrievich Surovtsev
- 1900 – 1901 Aleksandr Nikolayevich Bulygin (acting governor)
- 1901 – 1905 Mikhail Alekseyevich Pashkov
- 1905 Pyotr Petrovich Neklyudov (acting governor)
- 1905 Yakov Dmitrievich Bologovsky (acting governor)
- 1905 – 1914 Nikolai Aleksandrovich Zvegintsov
- 1914 – 1916 Arkady Ippolitovich Kelepovsky
- 1916 Sergei Sergeyevich Podolinsky (acting governor)
- 1916 – 1917 Nikolai Nikolayevich Lavrinovsky
- 1917 Sergei Alekseyevich Shidlovsky

== Coat of arms ==
Coat of arms of Governorate of Livonia
- Adopted: 1856
- Relinquished: 1918
- Crest: Russian Imperial crown
- Shield: Gules, a segreant griffin argent, in his dexter armed with a sword or, on his breast the cypher ПВ ИВ gules, imperially crowned
- Supporter: Branches of oak or, tied with the blue ribbon of the Order of Saint Andrew

The coat of arms of the Livonia Governorate was adopted on 8 December 1856. The blazon was, according to the description in Coat of arms of governorates and oblasts of the Russian Empire:

«В червленом поле серебряный гриф с золотым мечом, на груди, под Императорской короною, червленый вензель: ПВ ИВ (Петр Второй, Император Всероссийский). Щит увенчан Императорскою короною и окружен золотыми дубовыми листьями, соединенными Андреевскою лентою» (Note: In pre-reform orthography: «Въ червленомъ полѣ серебряный грифъ съ золотымъ мечомъ, на груди, подъ Императорской короною, червленый вензель: ПВ ИВ (Петръ Вторый, Императоръ Всероссійскій). Щитъ увѣнчанъ Императорскою короною и окруженъ золотыми дубовыми листьями, соединенными Андреевскою лентою»)

Which was translated as:

"In a scarlet field, there is a silver griffin with a golden sword, on the chest, under the Imperial crown, a scarlet monogram of ПВ ИВ (Peter the Second, Emperor of All Russia). The shield was topped with the Imperial crown and surrounded by golden oak leaves tied by the ribbon of the Order of Saint Andrew." (Note: Literal translation: Gules, a griffin Argent, armed with a sword or, on his breast the cypher ПB ИB (Pyotr Vtoroy, Imperator Vserossiyskiy) gules, imperially crowned; for a Crest, the Russian Imperial crown; for Supporters, Branches of oak or, tied with the blue ribbon of the Order of Saint Andrew.)

== Education ==
In 1890, 86.61% of children of school age received formal education. Educational institutions in 1890 numbered 1,959 with 137,285 students (74,514 male and 62,771 female). An additional 48,443 children studied under the supervision of the clergy. Cathedral and monastic schools had developed since the 13th century, followed by the opening of the Tartu Gymnasium in 1630 and the University of Tartu in 1632.

On 5 November 1804, Emperor Alexander I approved educational regulations establishing a multi-tier school system comprising parish elementary schools, county schools, governorate grammar schools, and universities. Major institutions included:

- University of Yuriyev (Dorpat) with 2,095 students,
- Riga Polytechnic Institute with 1,025 students,
- Tartu Veterinary Institute with 290 students,
- Riga Theological Seminary with 145 students,
- 16 male gymnasia and 11 female gymnasia,
- 2 teachers' seminaries (Vidzeme Teachers' Seminary in Valka and Tartu Teachers' Seminary),
- 2 craft schools in Riga,
- 3 maritime schools,
- 48 county schools and over 1,300 parish and church schools.

== Infrastructure ==
=== Press ===
In the late 19th century, 24 newspapers and periodicals were published (12 in Riga, 10 in Yuriev, 2 in Pernau), including titles in German, Latvian, Estonian, and Russian.

=== Healthcare ===
In 1890, there were 262 practicing physicians and 104 pharmacies in the governorate. Public and private hospitals operated in all county towns, with major facilities located in Riga and attached to the medical faculty of Yuriev University.

=== Ports ===
Major maritime traffic passed through the port of Riga on the Daugava River and the port of Pärnu on the Pärnu River, with local harbours at Kuressaare, Sõrve, and Mustjala on Saaremaa.

=== Railways ===
Rail connections included the broad-gauge lines linking Riga, Pskov, Valga, and Tartu (connecting to Tallinn and Saint Petersburg), as well as narrow-gauge lines including the Valga–Rūjiena–Pärnu and Mõisaküla–Viljandi routes.

=== Postal infrastructure ===
Postal communications were organized originally by the Livonian knighthood and later overseen by the imperial postal authorities, operating along four main postal routes serviced by a network of post stations.

== See also ==
- Administrative divisions of Russia in 1713-1714
- Baltic governorates
- Courland Governorate
- Estonia Governorate
- Livonian Confederation
