= List of wars between Poland and Sweden =

This is a list of wars between the Polish–Lithuanian Commonwealth and Sweden. Broadly construed, the term refers to a series of wars between 1562 and 1814. More narrowly, it refers to particular wars between 1600 and 1629.

== List ==
These are the wars included under the broader use of the term:

War	Notes	Treaty	Result
Swedish expedition to Livonia	Caused by Duke John loaning money to Poland–Lithuania in exchange for fortresses in Livonia.	Formal peace never signed.	Swedish victory
Polish–Swedish War (1563–1568)	Caused by the entrance of Poland–Lithuania in the Northern Seven Years War	Formal peace never signed, however the war ends when John III becomes king.	Swedish victory
War against Sigismund	Started by Charles IX in an attempt to depose Sigismund III.	Continued by the Polish–Swedish War (1600–1611).	Swedish victory
De la Gardie Campaign	Swedish intervention in the Polish–Russian War (1609–1618)	Truce signed after the Battle of Klushino	Polish–Lithuanian victory
Polish–Swedish War (1600–1611)	Continuation of the War against Sigismund.	Truce signed in 1611.	Disputed
Polish–Swedish War (1617–1618)	Phase of the longer Polish–Swedish War (1600–1629).	Truce of Tolsburg	Swedish victory
Polish–Swedish War (1621–1625)	Phase of the longer Polish–Swedish War (1600–1629).	Truce of Mitawa	Swedish victory
Polish–Swedish War (1626–1629)	Last phase of the Polish–Swedish War (1600–1629).	Treaty of Altmark	Swedish victory
Northern War of 1655–1660	Instigated by Charles X Gustav in an attempt to force John II Casimir to renounce his claim to the Swedish throne.	Treaty of Oliva	Disputed
Swedish invasion of Poland	First stage of the Great Northern War	Treaties of Warsaw and Altranstädt	Swedish victory
Northern War (1709–1721)	Attempt to remove Sweden's baltic dominance	Treaty of Nystad	Coalition victory
War of the Fourth Coalition	Part of the Napoleonic Wars.	Treaty of Poznań; Treaties of Tilsit	French alliance victory
War of the Sixth Coalition	Part of the Napoleonic Wars.	Congress of Vienna	Coalition victory

== See also ==
- List of wars involving Poland
- List of wars involving Sweden
- Polish–Ottoman Wars
- Polish–Russian Wars
- Polish–Teutonic War – Military conflicts
- History of Sweden (1611–1648) – Rise of Sweden as a great power

== Works cited ==
- Björlin, G. (1890). Gustaf II Adolf: läsning för ung och gammal (in Swedish).
