= Alūksne (disambiguation) =

Alūksne may refer to the following places in Latvia:

- Alūksne, a town
- Alūksne municipality
- Alūksne district (defunct)
- Lake Alūksne
- Alūksne River
- Alūksne Upland
- Alūksne Castle
