= Burtnieki Parish =

Parish in Valmiera Municipality, Latvia

- parish of Latvia
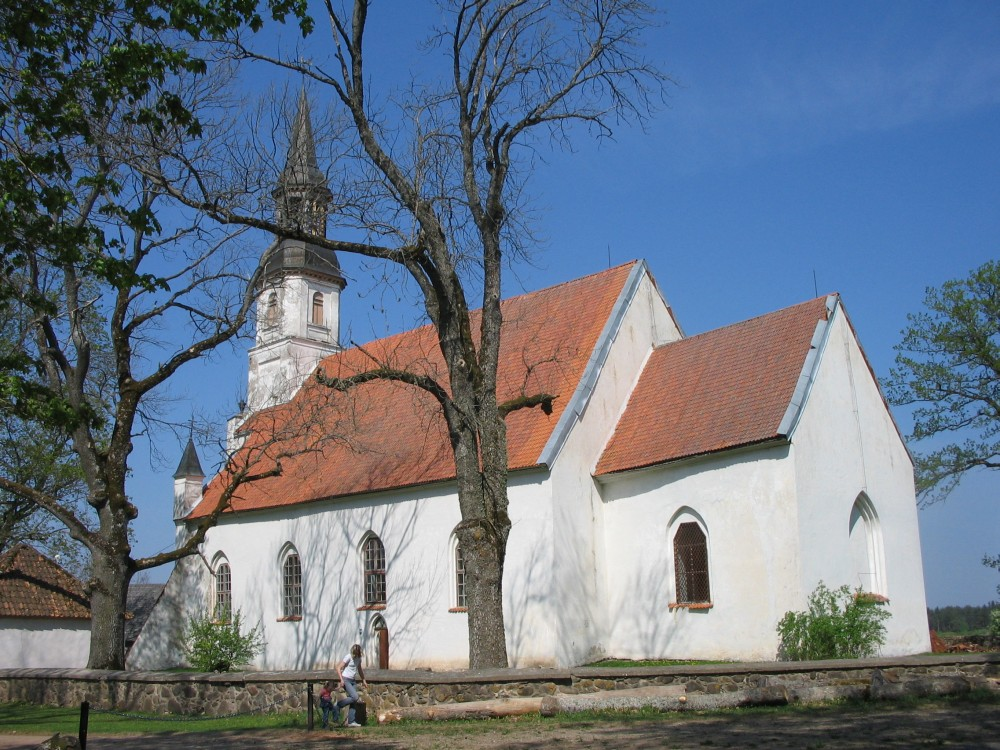

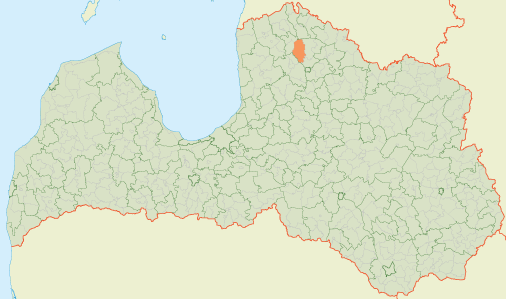
- Coordinates: 57°41′28″N 25°18′00″E
- Country: Latvia

Population (1 January 2026)
  - Total: 1,117

Burtnieki Parish (Latvian: Burtnieku pagasts) is an administrative territorial entity (parish) of Valmiera Municipality in the Vidzeme region of Latvia. The administrative center is Burtnieki and the population in 2025 was 1,148.

Previously, the parish was a part of Valmiera county, Valmiera district, and Burtnieki Municipality.

== Villages and settlements ==
- Burtnieki
- Penči
- Dūre
- Pidriķis
- Taubes
- Briedupe
- Briedes
- Kapteines

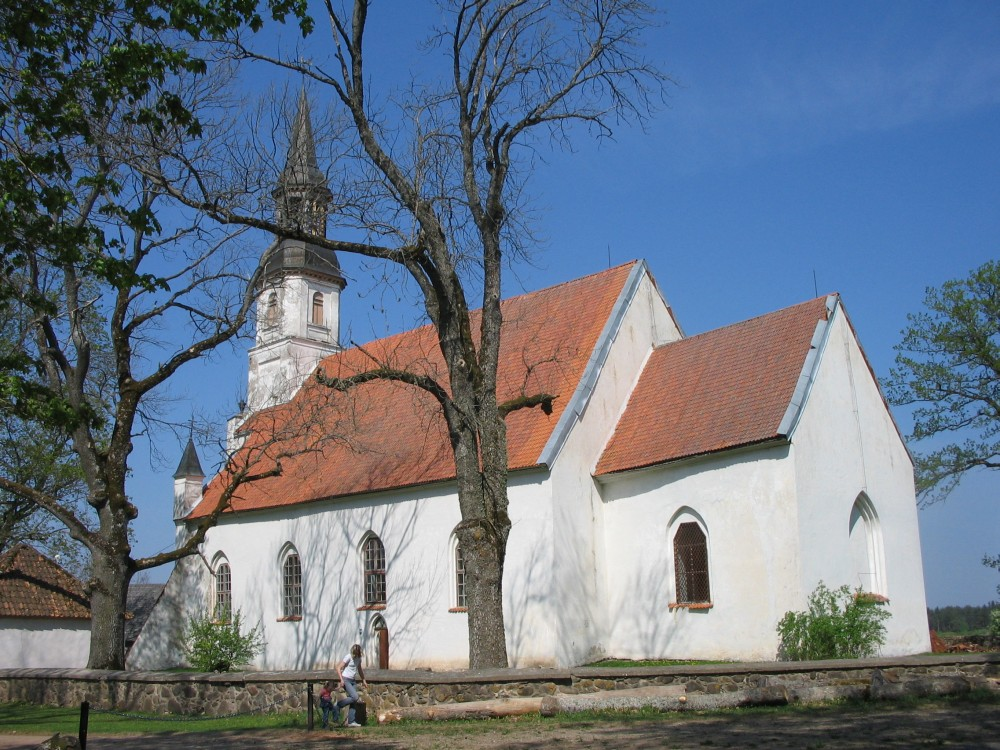
Lutheran church in Burtnieki village
