= Swedish expedition to Livonia =

Swedish invasion of Livonia in 1562

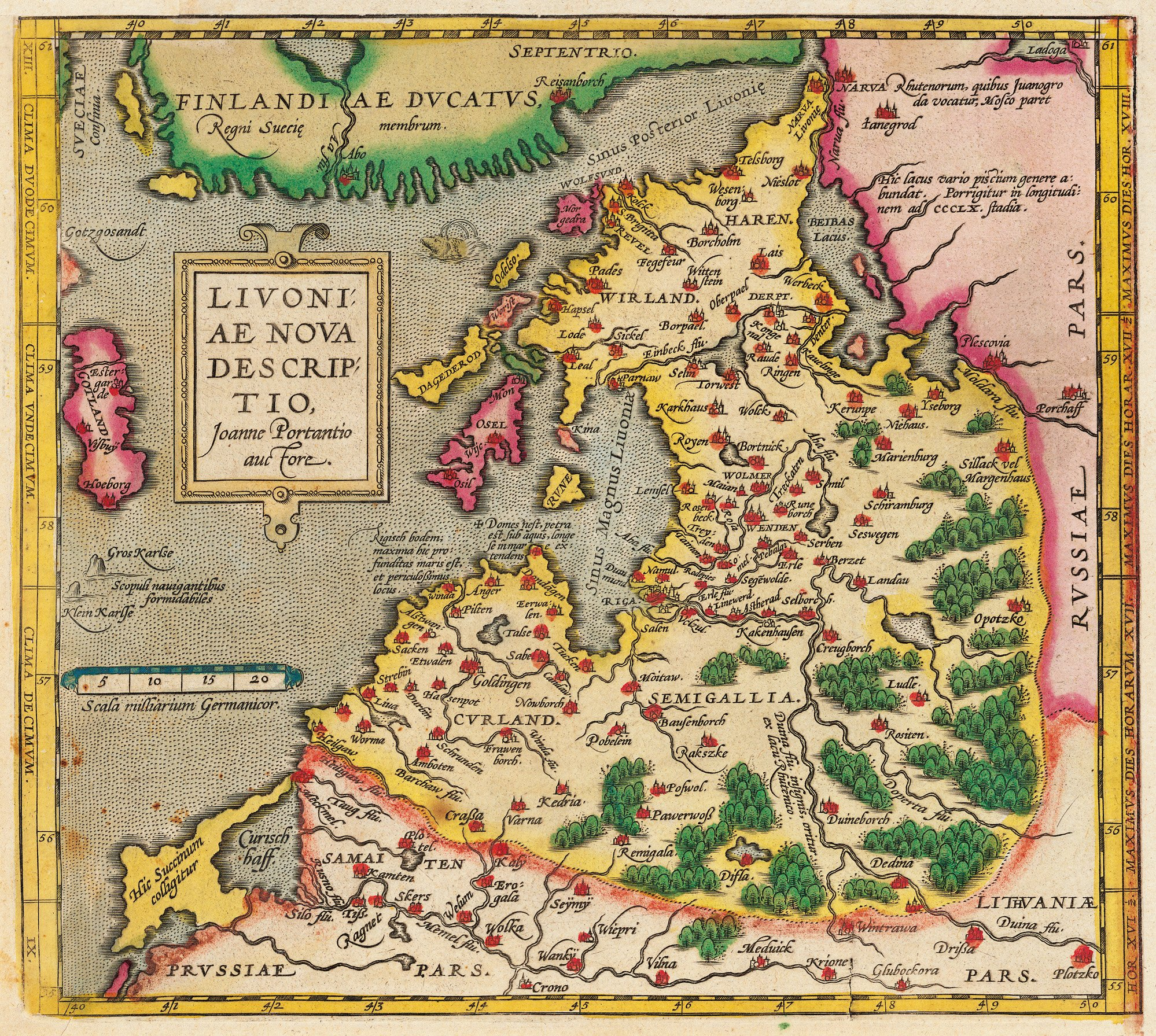
- Map of Old Livonia by Abraham Ortelius
Date	June–Late 1562
Location	Livonia
Result	Swedish victory
Territorial changes	Large parts of northern Livonia are occupied by Sweden; John's fortresses in the Baltic are conquered by the Swedes

Belligerents
Sweden	John's supporters Polish–Lithuanian union (Note: De-facto)

Commanders and leaders
Eric XIV; Åke Bengtsson Färla; Klas Horn	John III

Strength
5,000–6,000 men	Unknown

Casualties and losses
Unknown	Unknown

The Swedish expedition to Livonia was a Swedish military offensive and war directed towards the land controlled by John III in the Baltic in 1562. Despite it being mainly against John III, the Swedes also captured fortresses under the Polish–Lithuanian union. The Swedes also managed to occupy a majority of northern Livonia.

== Background ==
Eric XIV and John III

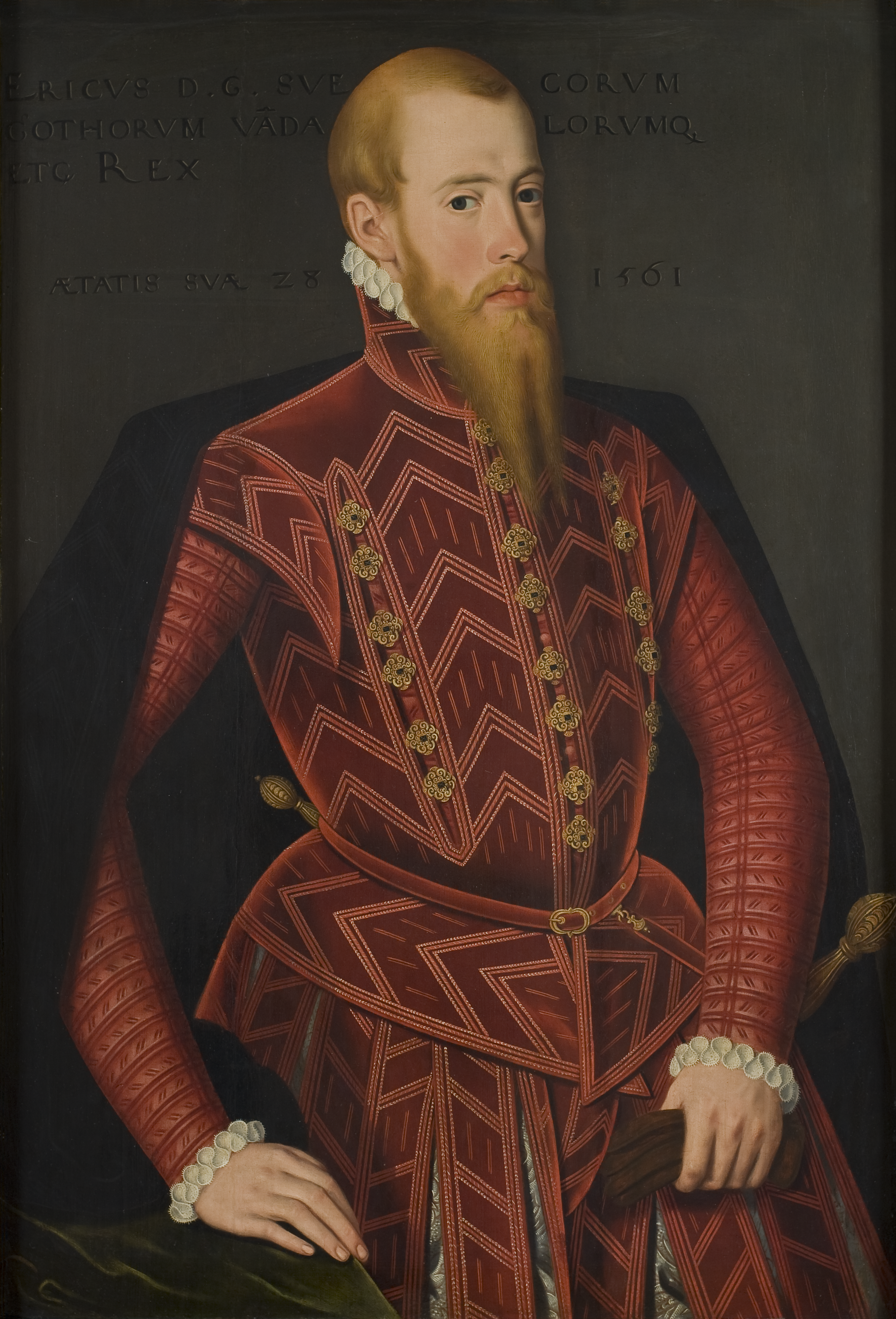
Eric XIV (1533-77)

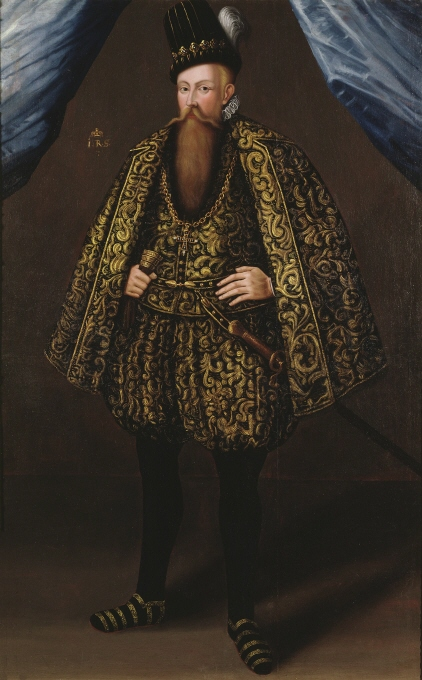
Johan III, (1537-92)

=== Tensions between Eric and John ===
In 1562, Eric XIV's anger towards his brother, John III, rose higher than it had before. He was upset about his marriage proposal to Catherine Jagiellon, more so when John, on his own accord, loaned out money to the Poles and in return received many Polish fortresses in the Baltic as collateral, which legally he had no right to do.

These fortresses also extended John's power which Eric perceived as a threat. John's loan was seen as a declaration of war between the two, and John had practically rebelled against Eric, which John did not notice. He instead wrote a friendly letter to Eric inviting him to the wedding between him and Catherine Jagiellon.

Eric was concerned that, in case of deteriorating relations with Russia, John's Polish allies would abandon him. However, his biggest fear was that John would use his power to create his own kingdom with support from the Poles.

=== Prelude and the Dano-Polish Alliance ===
Frederick II of Denmark and Sigismund II Augustus

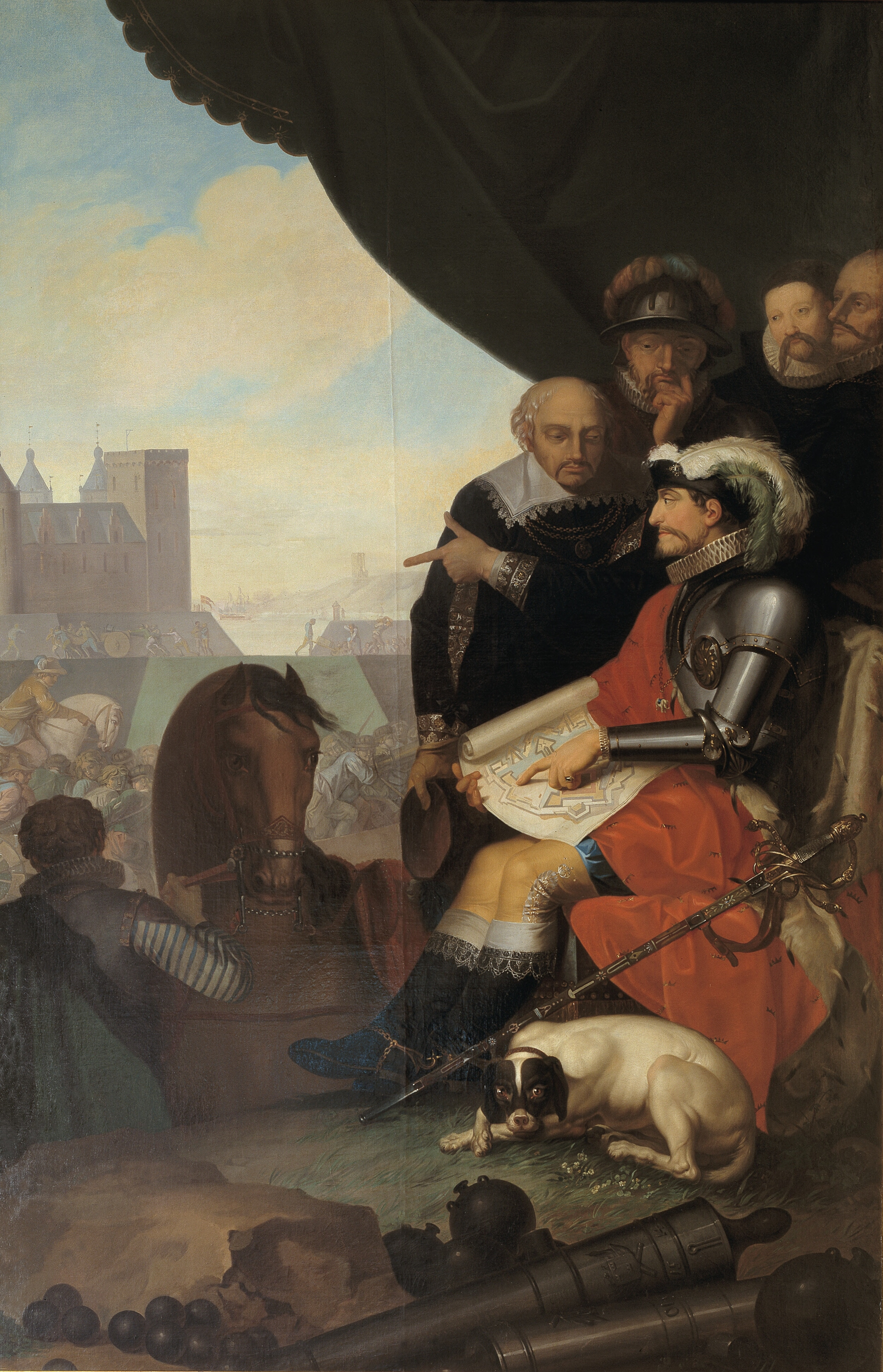
Painting of Frederick II (1534–1588) building Kronborg

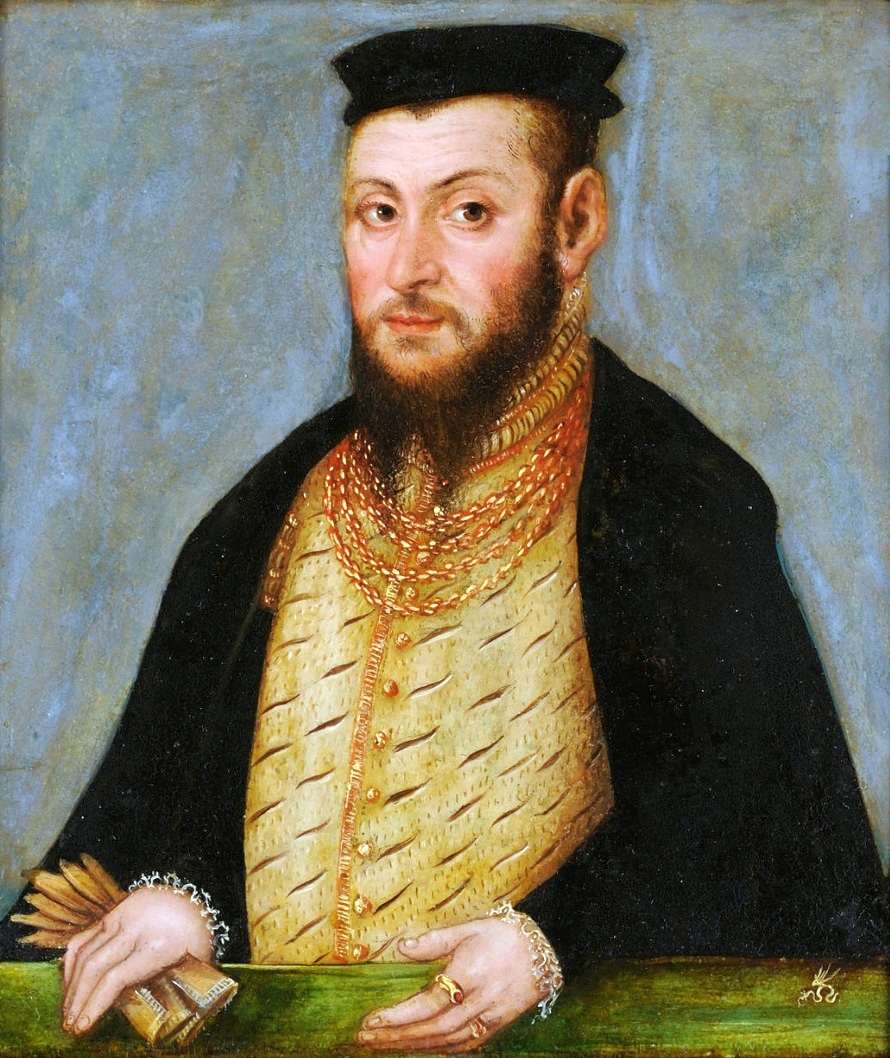
Portrait of Sigismund II from c. 1553

Seeing the situation, Eric moved to end the truce between Sweden and Poland that had been in place since 1561 in the summer of 1562. His decision led to the Poles seeking an alliance with Denmark–Norway, since Sigismund needed an ally in the ongoing struggle for the Baltic. On August 26, a delegation from Poland requested an audience with the Danish king, Frederick II to discuss an alliance. At the time, Frederick had realized that a war with Sweden was imminent and quickly saw Poland as a friend.

== Expedition ==
Pärnu

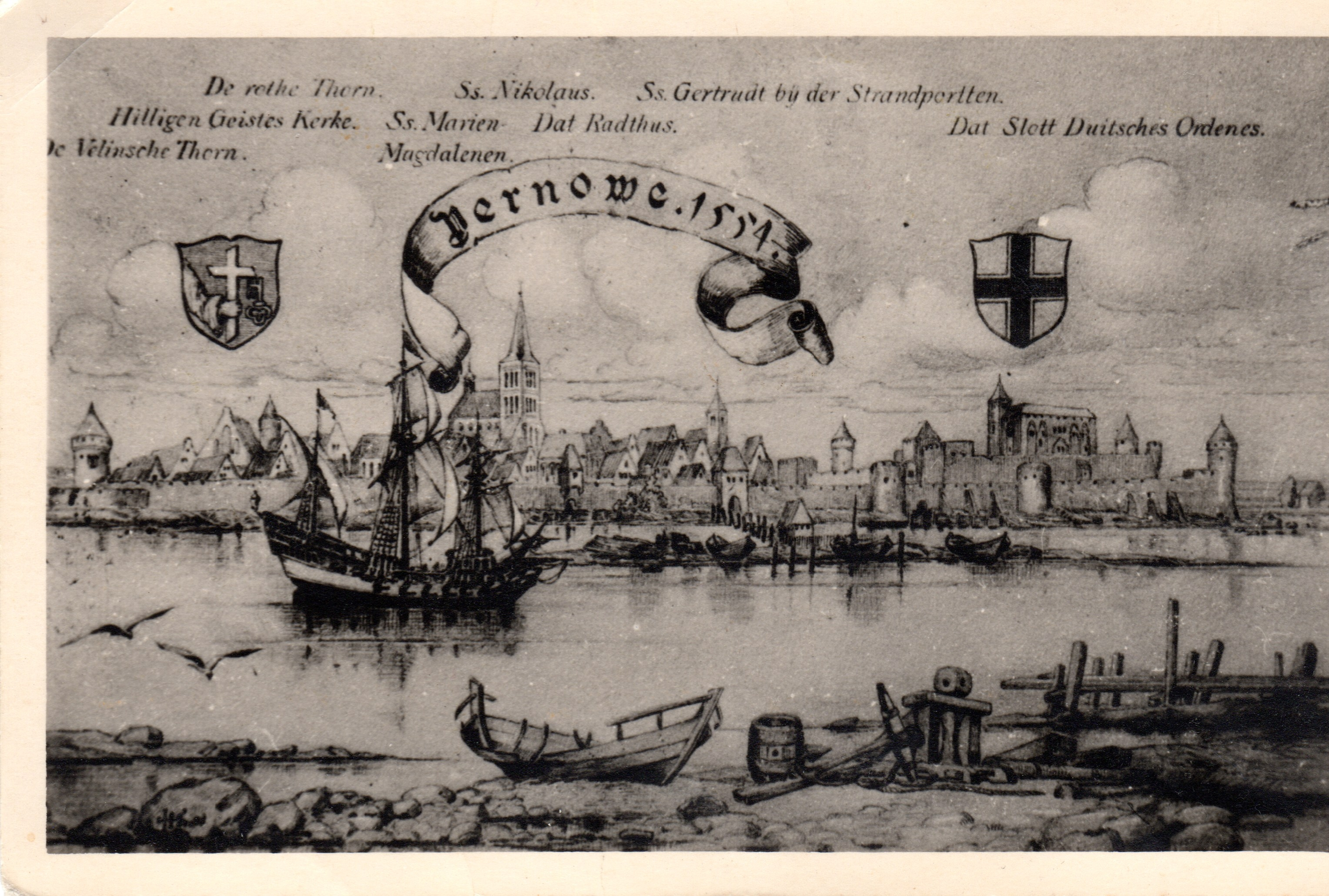
Drawing of the town of Pärnu (then Pernau) in 1554

By the time the Polish-Danish alliance was finalized, the Swedes had already begun their conquests with significant success. The primary targets of the Swedes were the cities of Hapsal and Pärnu. The Swede's first major victory during the expedition was the conquest of Pärnu, which fell to Klas Horn on June 4. After the conquest, Åke Bengtsson Färla was made commandant of the fortress. The conquest of Pärnu was also extremely important, as it cut off a road into southern Estonia that could no longer be exploited by the Poles.

The next target of the Swedes was Weissenstein, which was technically under Swedish rule, however, the nobility there showed strong sympathy to the Poles. The Swedish troops quickly besieged Weissenstein. Eric also intended to take Riga under his protection, as it was the richest city in the Baltic, although this would not happen.

As the Swedes advanced into Livonia, John III's relationship with Sigismund became stronger. On October 16, John married Catherine, he also sent Sigismund another large sum of money, and in return received even more castles, those being Weissenstein, Helmet, Karkus, Ermes, Ruijen, Burtnik, and Trikaten. On top of this, John still refused to lend any money to Eric, citing that he had none. Formally, these were pledged for eight years, although John believed he had received them for life. For John, the castles were a starting point for an independent policy, which was what Eric had feared, and for Sigismund, the new autonomous zone under John would provide an excellent way to block Swedish invasions. Eric would have to fight his brother if he wanted to expand southwards, which would be problematic for him.

The only problem plaguing this was Eric himself, his troops had already been besieging Weissenstein, and later captured it in October or 18 November. From Eric's point of view, the transaction between John and Sigismund was nothing but open treason against him, and he had no plans of letting the transaction go through successfully. With Weissenstein in their hands, the Swedes moved towards Karkus. Once again, the Swedes were met with success, in late 1562, Karkus' defenders agreed to capitulate and let the Swedish garrison into the city.

The main reason for the Swedish successes was that Eric XIV was able to pledge all available resources to Livonia since Sweden was not involved in any other war at the time. The Swedish occupation was maintained with 5,000-6,000 German mercenary soldiers. After the Swedes had conquered Karkus, the amount of troops in Livonia was reduced, although Sweden remained militarily stronger than its neighbors in the area.

== Aftermath ==
The expedition had resulted in the Swedish standing in Livonia being stabilized, although it was a highly expensive adventure, and the Northern Seven Years' War would later break out in 1563, with the Polish–Lithuanian union joining the war against Sweden because of the expedition.

== See also ==
- Polish–Swedish War (1563–1568) – War between Poland and Sweden
