= Truce of Mitawa =

Truce ending the Polish–Swedish War (1620–1622)

The Truce of Mitawa or Truce of Mitau, signed in November 1622 in Jelgava (Mitawa, Mitau), ended the Polish–Swedish War (1620–1622).

The Polish–Lithuanian Commonwealth was forced to cede the Duchy of Livonia north of the Daugava River to the Kingdom of Sweden. It retained only a nominal control over the south-eastern territories near Riga, as well as the Duchy of Courland. The truce lasted till March 1625, when a new war wave of hostilities erupted in Lithuania. It was soon followed by the Polish–Swedish War (1625–1629).

== See also ==
- Polish–Swedish wars
