= Polish–Swedish War (1563–1568) =

War between Poland and Sweden

- Part of the Northern Seven Years' War
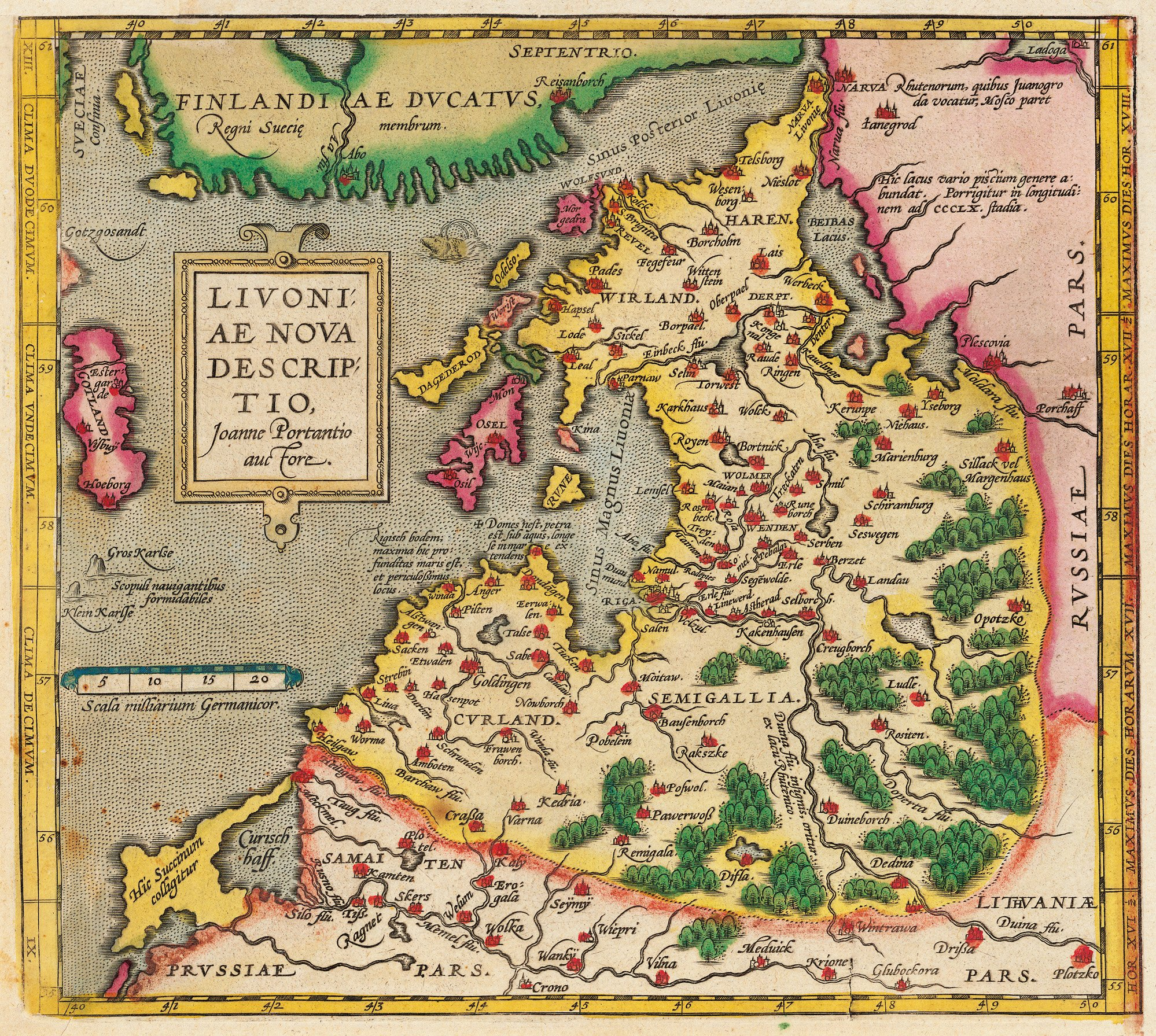
- Map of Old Livonia by Abraham Ortelius, where the fighting during the war took place
Date	1563–1568 (Note: No official peace treaty was signed, however, the fighting ended when John III was crowned King of Sweden.)
Location	Estonia
Result	Swedish victory
Territorial changes	Status quo ante bellum

Belligerents
Sweden	Polish–Lithuanian union; Livonian nobility; Duchy of Courland; Estonian rebels; Denmark–Norway; Lübeck

Commanders and leaders
Eric XIV; Svante Sture; Åke Bengtsson Färla; Henrik Klasson Horn; Håkan Olsson (surrendered); Torsten Henriksson; Clas Kursell; Johann Maydell Goswinsson (POW); Hans Boije af Gennäs (POW)	Sigismund II Augustus; Konrad von Oldenbokum †; Henrik Dücker; Alexander Polobentski; Mikołaj Talwosz (Courland) Gotthard Kettler (Denmark–Norway) Christoffer Valkendorff (Denmark–Norway) Reinhold Zöge (surrendered)

Units involved
Pernau garrison Reval garrison Karkus garrison	Pernau garrison (Denmark–Norway) Leal garrison (Denmark–Norway) Lode garrison (Denmark–Norway) Hapsal garrison

The Polish–Swedish War (1563–1568), also called the First Polish War (Swedish: Första Polska Kriget) (Polish: Wojna polsko-szwedzka (1563–1568)) was waged primarily in the Baltic during the larger Northern Seven Years' War between Sweden and the Polish–Lithuanian union, the Duchy of Courland, parts of the Livonian nobility, and Estonian rebels from 1563 to 1568. The war ultimately ended when John III became the King of Sweden, resulting in a Swedish victory.

== Background ==
Livonian Order

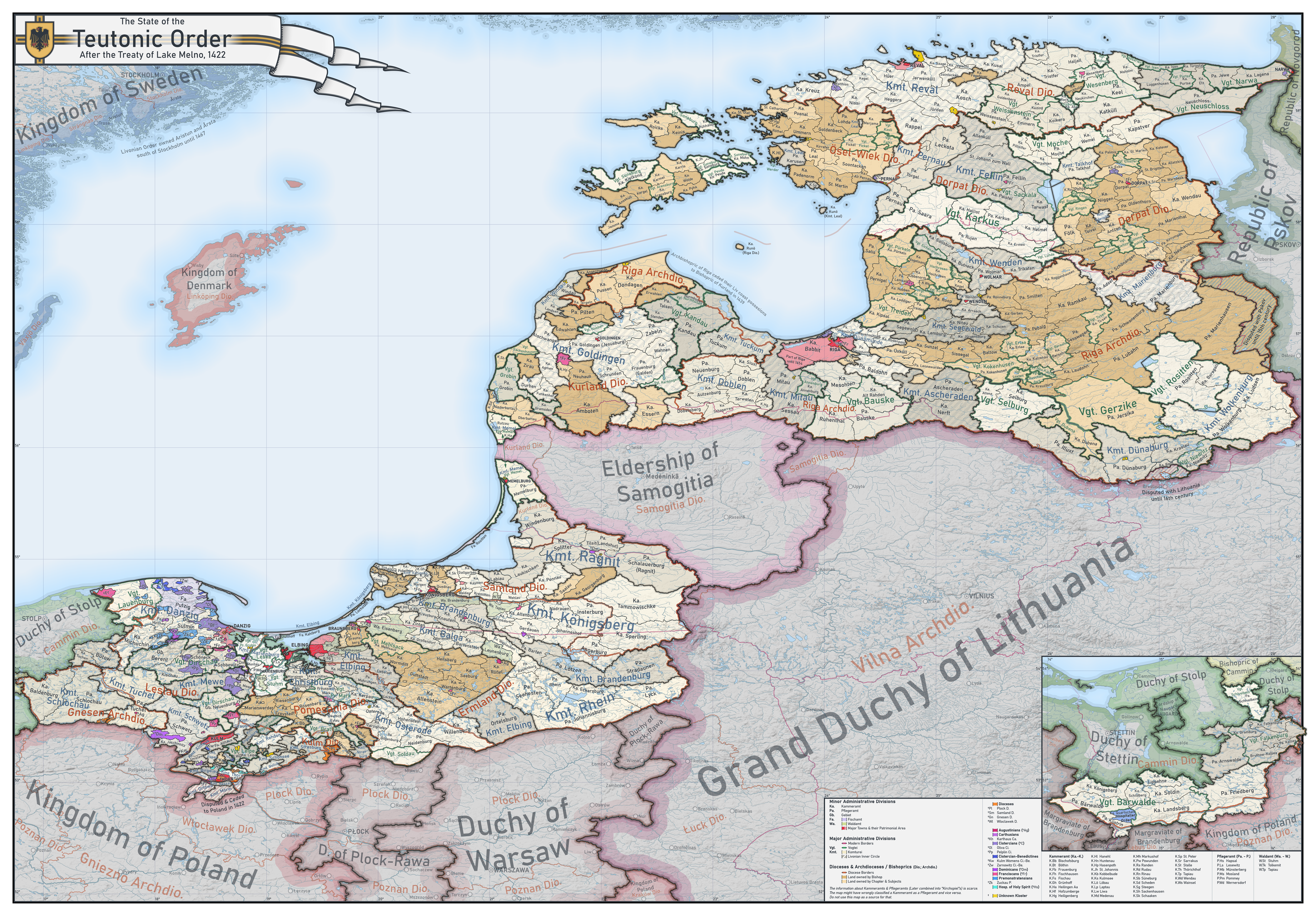
Map showing the territory held by the Teutonic & Livonian Order in 1422

=== Division of the Livonian Order ===
Around 1560, after the collapse of the Livonian Order from their defeat at the Battle of Ērģeme, its old territories were divided between Sweden, Denmark, Russia, and Poland. With these powers also fighting over the farmlands and commerce surrounding the Baltic sea. The Russians managed to conquer large areas of Estonia in 1558, including Narva, which allegedly began the power vacuum that lasted for more than thirty years.

Ösel and Wiek would fall into Danish rule, and Reval, Harrien, Wierland, and Järven fell under Swedish rule in 1561. Dorpat, Wesenberg, and Fellin would also quickly fall into Russian rule with the rest of the Livonian Order's territory becoming Polish.

=== Prelude to the Northern Seven Years' War ===
Disputed icons

Tre Kronor symbol

Danish Coat of Arms

==== Dano-Swedish coat of arms dispute ====
Denmark and Sweden have had a long and shared history of fighting and disagreements, but they also shared similar experiences. During the Kalmar Union's existence, the three Nordic nations of Denmark, Sweden, and Norway had been ruled, at least in theory, by one monarch. The Union had been dissolved and reinstated numerous times from 1389 to 1523, when Gustav Vasa's rebellion ended it definitively.

Denmark had a tough time stopping the Swedish defection, and the end of the Kalmar Union led to strong feelings of mistrust and hate between Swedes and Danes.

The adoption of the Three Crowns into the Danish coat of arms and the Danish lions into the Swedish coat of arms was seen as the primary reason for the war by both rulers, Eric and Frederick, with everything else not counting.

Battle of Bornholm (1563)

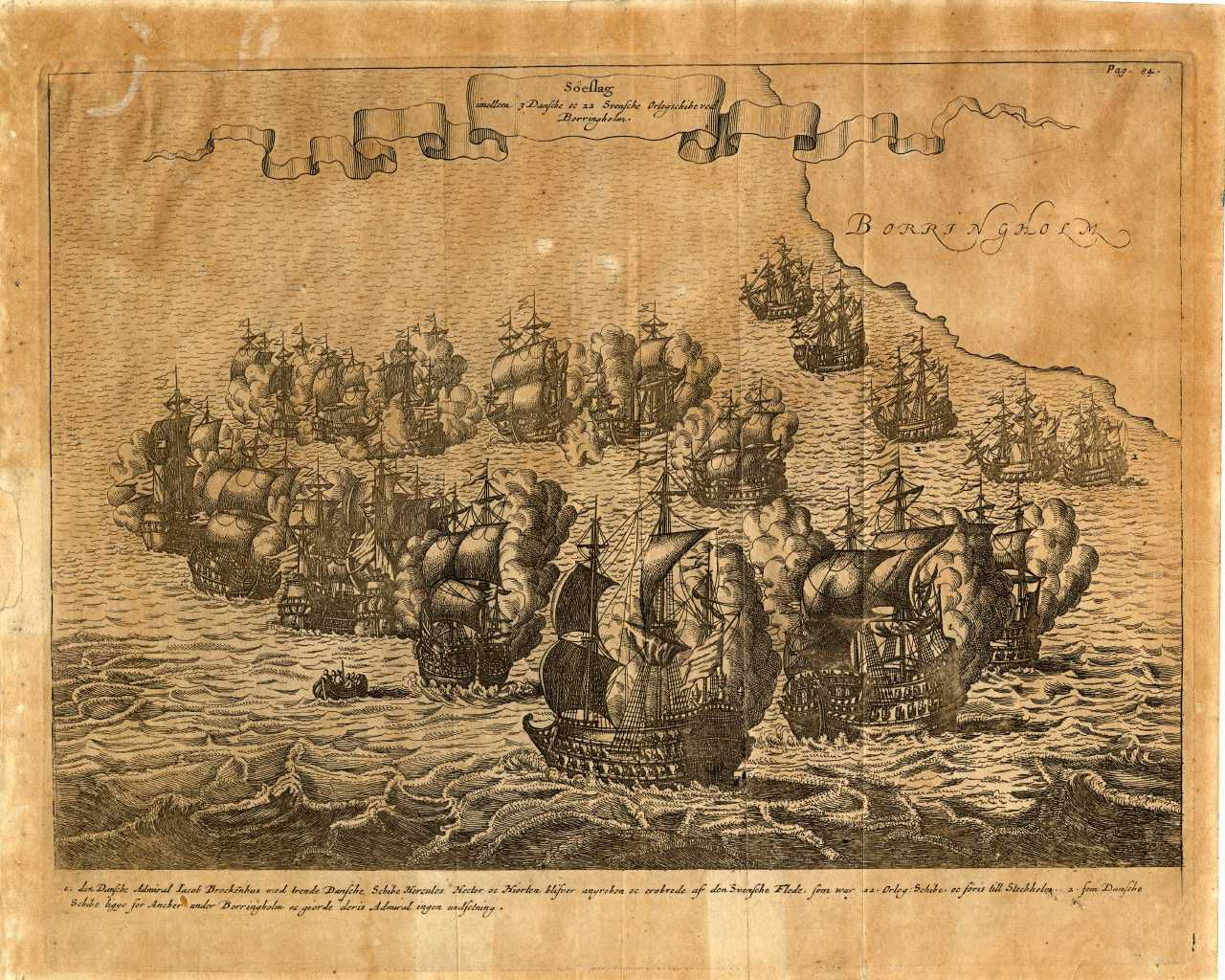
The Battle of Bornholm in 1563

==== Bornholm incident ====
Jakob Bagge

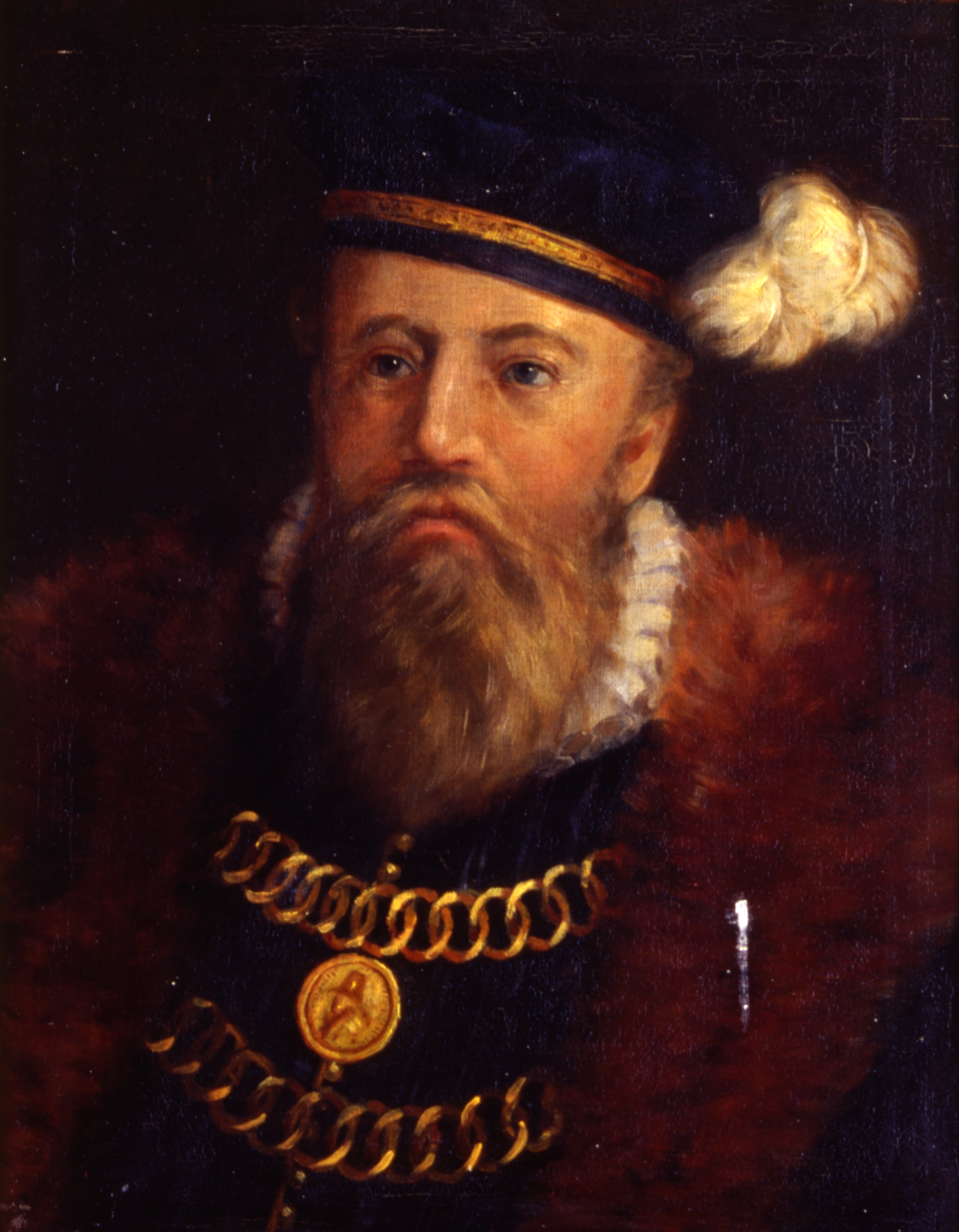
Admiral Jakob Bagge (1502-77)

===== Prelude =====
In early 1563, Jakob Bagge was ordered by Eric XIV to provoke the Danes near Gotland or Bornholm, so that if the Danes engaged him Eric could declare war on the pretext of self-defense. Bagge ordered the crew on the Swedish ships not to strike the top sail on their ships which was normally done to show respect.

Bagge hoped this would be insulting enough for the Danes to attack. If Eric's plans unfolded as planned, all of Europe would hear how Danish ships attacked the "poor Swedish ships who were just on the way to transport a wife for their king"

On 30 May, the Swedes set sail for Bornholm, they could have avoided the island entirely, as they were going to Rostock, but instead, they went as close as possible to Hammershus fortress and the harbor in Rönne. When they came in hearing distance, they fired two shots, which signalled that the ships were Swedish. In Hammershus, the Lübeckian chief Schweder Kettingk and his men were stationed there, however, in Rönne's harbour, there were several Danish warships. The harbor had been created as a temporary base for the Danish navy. King Frederick had previously given out an order saying that the Danish navy was to patrol the Baltic Sea and visit all Swedish ships that were encountered. If they found cargo ships with food or war material the cargo was to be confiscated.

The Danes held deep mistrust for the Swedes, and when the Danes first heard the two shots from the Swedish ships, three Danish warships were dispatched to meet the Swedes, one of these being the flagship Herkules with the admiral Jacob Brockenhuus onboard.

There was also a Hessian delegation on the Swedish flagship, of which none knew of the true Swedish intentions. The atmosphere onboard was lively, with music playing. The crew's attention was not directed towards the three Danish warships that were quickly approaching. After the Danish ships had come closer, three shots were fired, signalling that the ships were Danish, after this signal, the events that followed are disputed.

====== Danish version ======
According to Danish sources, the Danes fired three blanks to warn the Swedes of their presence and to allow the crew onboard to show their good will. After which they fired a live round which penetrated the sail of the Elefanten.

Blood flag

====== Swedish version ======
According to Swedish sources, the Danes only fired 2 blank rounds, with the third one being a live round which gave Bagge a reason to fire back at the Danes.

====== Battle ======
On the stern of the Elefanten, the "blood flag" was raised, which signalled the other ships that the sea battle was to begin. The Swedes did not spare any of their gunpowder, the hole in the Elefanten's sail was compensated for in the ensuing battle, which lasted several hours. Almost immediately, a Swedish cannonball hit the mainmast of the Herkules, which fell down and landed in the middle of the firing line for the men onboard, while the Danes were removing the mast, the Swedes continued shooting at the ship, causing heavy casualties. The Danes, who were aware of the possibility that fighting would break out, were taken by surprise by the Swedes.

The small group of three Danish ships that had sailed from Rönne were only intended to control the waters and make sure the Swedes respected their neighbours, and not for a large sea battle. It is likely that the Danes wanted to go onboard the Swedish ships to make sure everything was as it was supposed to be. The remaining Danish ships in Rönne did not come to help Admiral Jacob Brockenhuus, instead, they stayed at a safe distance and did not participate in the battle. As a result of their inferior numbers, the Danes suffered a crushing defeat, and when Brockenhuus, realizing that the remaining Danish ships would be destroyed, surrendered to the Swedes.

====== Aftermath ======
After the battle, having lured the Danes into his trap, Jacob Bagges mission was completed. As a consequence, Frederick and the Danish fleet were seen as the aggressors, and when the war broke out, Eric hoped that the entire world would "pour sympathy" for him.

== 1563 ==
On 9 August, Denmark and Lübeck declared war on Sweden, and on 5 October Denmark and Poland signed an alliance pact, although the Poles never sent an official declaration of war to the Swedes. When the war began, Svante Sture was the governor of Swedish Estonia and Charles de Mornay held command of the Swedish troops there. However, Mornay was needed in Sweden and instead command was handed over to Åke Bengtsson Färla. Åke had previously received strict orders from Eric to conquer the Danish holdings in Estonia if war broke out.

Map of Wiek county, where the campaign took place.

=== Estonian campaign ===
As expected, the Swedes enjoyed success in the start of their campaign, mainly due to them being more numerous than the Danes. Åke managed to successfully besiege and capture both Leal and Hapsal with around 450 men in Western Estonia in August. The capture of the two cities granted the Swedes control over almost all of Wiek. However, the success of the Swedes was quickly reduced, as both the Polish–Lithuanian Union and the Duchy of Courland intervened. In September, while the Swedes were besieging Lode, Gotthard Kettler along with four banners of cavalry, two companies of foot soldiers, and 800 Poles and Tatars attacked the Swedish besieging force, which consisted of around 2 banners and 3 companies of foot soldiers. After a while, the intervention force managed to chase the Swedes away on 30 September. Åke probably did not dare to meet Gotthard in open battle as the German cavalry in his forces refused to obey the king's orders.

Before the Swedes managed to organize a resistance, Poles and Germans under Danish service managed to recapture Leal from the Swedes. The defense of Leal was handed over to a number of nobles from Wiek by Gotthard; they had previously fled to Ösel during the initial Swedish offensive but had been recalled by Gotthard. Due to the Swedish force being so numerous, it could quickly repair the damage it sustained and recapture Leal. As a consequence of the Swedes capturing Hapsal and Leal, the Danish Empire was reduced to the sea.

=== End of the year ===
Eric XIV saw the conflict with the Poles at the time with indifference and attempted to organize a truce, which failed. In October, Henrik Klasson Horn was assigned as the new commander in Estonia. He received 500,000 marks in funds and was ordered to keep a force of 6,000 soldiers and 1,000 cavalry in Estonia, which he never managed to get. Luckily for the Swedes, neither the Danes or the Poles prioritized the Baltic theatre. The Polish king dismissed all of his German cavalry in late 1563 and the Poles limited themselves to a careful offensive against the isolated Swedish fortress of Karkus. Eric had large ambitions for Horn, ordering him to capture numerous castles belonging to the Diocese of Riga, the remaining fortresses under Duke John, and Ösel along with the surrounding islands.

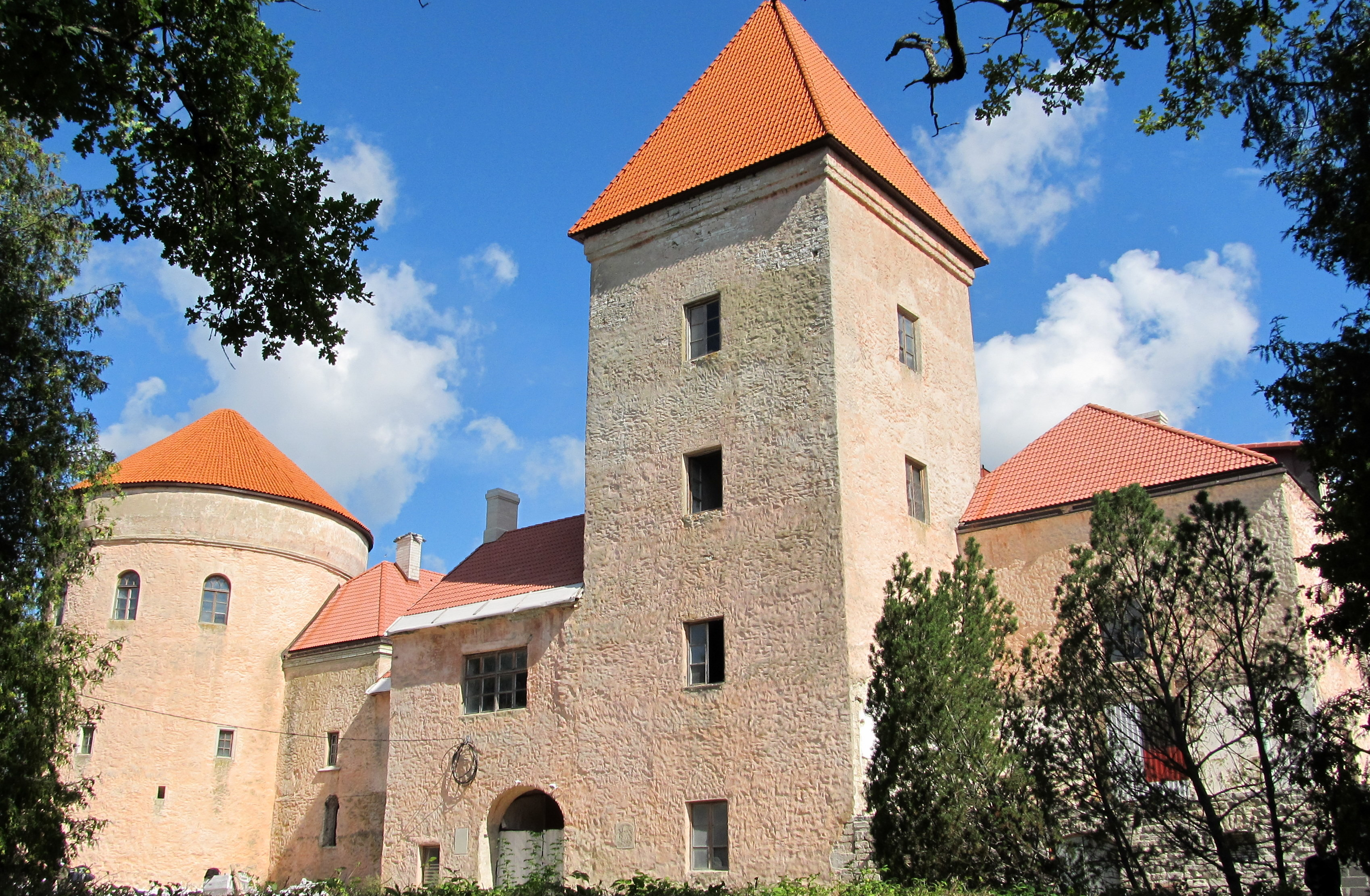
Lode (modern day Koluvere) fortress

== 1564 ==
In the start of 1564, it was clear to the Swedes that the war against Denmark–Norway required all of the available recources in the country, and Horn's missions were therefore reduced. He was now assigned to march against Ösel or alternatively against the castles around Riga and then concentrate the Swedish forces on a defence of the Swedish holdings. The troops that were not deemed necessary in Estonia were sent back to Sweden to fight against the Danes. Henrik Klasson Horn began the Swedish campaigning by moving against Lode in the beginning of the year and, despite lacking artillery and because no Poles or Tatars intervened, he succeeded in taking it. During the siege, the lieutenant of Klaus Kursell, Henrik Dücker, defected to the Poles and joined Kaspar Oldenbokum, under whose command he brought around 200 horsemen. As a result of his conquest of Lode, Horn had effectively ousted the Danes from the Estonian mainland. He then turned to Ösel. However, the weakness of the ice hindered him from crossing over to the island. Simultaneously, a message from Ösel claimed that Sweden and Denmark had begun peace negotiations, which Horn believed and on 19 February a truce for 2 months between the Swedes and Danes was established. The truce was later extended to 1 October 1564, and again to May 1565.

In the ending months of the year, Henrik Klasson Horn commanded around 2,400 men and 900 cavalry.

== 1565 ==
At the beginning of the year, Swedish forces in Estonia consisted of around 2,467 soldiers and 907 cavalry according to a muster carried out in January. Other than the Poles, the Swedes were now faced with another dangerous enemy; Kaspar von Oldenbokum had assembled an army of mercenaries, who wanted to dislodge the Swedes from Estonia and create a new Order, under Poland.

=== Conquest of Pernau and the Attack on Karkus ===
In the end of April, Kaspar von Oldenbokum and his mercenaries performed a coup in the Swedish fortress of Pernau. Oldenbokum and his men organized a party at one of Pernau's council members, Klas Zinte, who they knew had a key to the city gates hanging in his bedroom at night. When Zinte, who had become very drunk, had gone to sleep, a mercenary snuck into his room and stole the key. Under the cover of night, the city gate was opened and Oldenbokum with the rest of his men rushed into the city. The Swedish part of the garrison, around 100 men, were all slaughtered. Only a single mercenary was killed, the knight Kuntz von Ende, who had previously been in Swedish service. Pernau's fortress, under the command of Håkan Olsson, capitulated on 9 June, despite the stores being full and its walls intact. Henrik Klasson Horn tried on many occasions to assist Pernau, but decided that his forces were too weak to engage in open battle with Oldenbokum. With the fall of Pernau, the land behind it would be open for Polish raids.

Almost simultaneously as Pernau was attacked, a force under Alexander Polobentski went to attack Karkus. The city was assaulted on the 8 and 13 May, but the defenders under the leadership of Torsten Henriksson repelled all of the attacks.

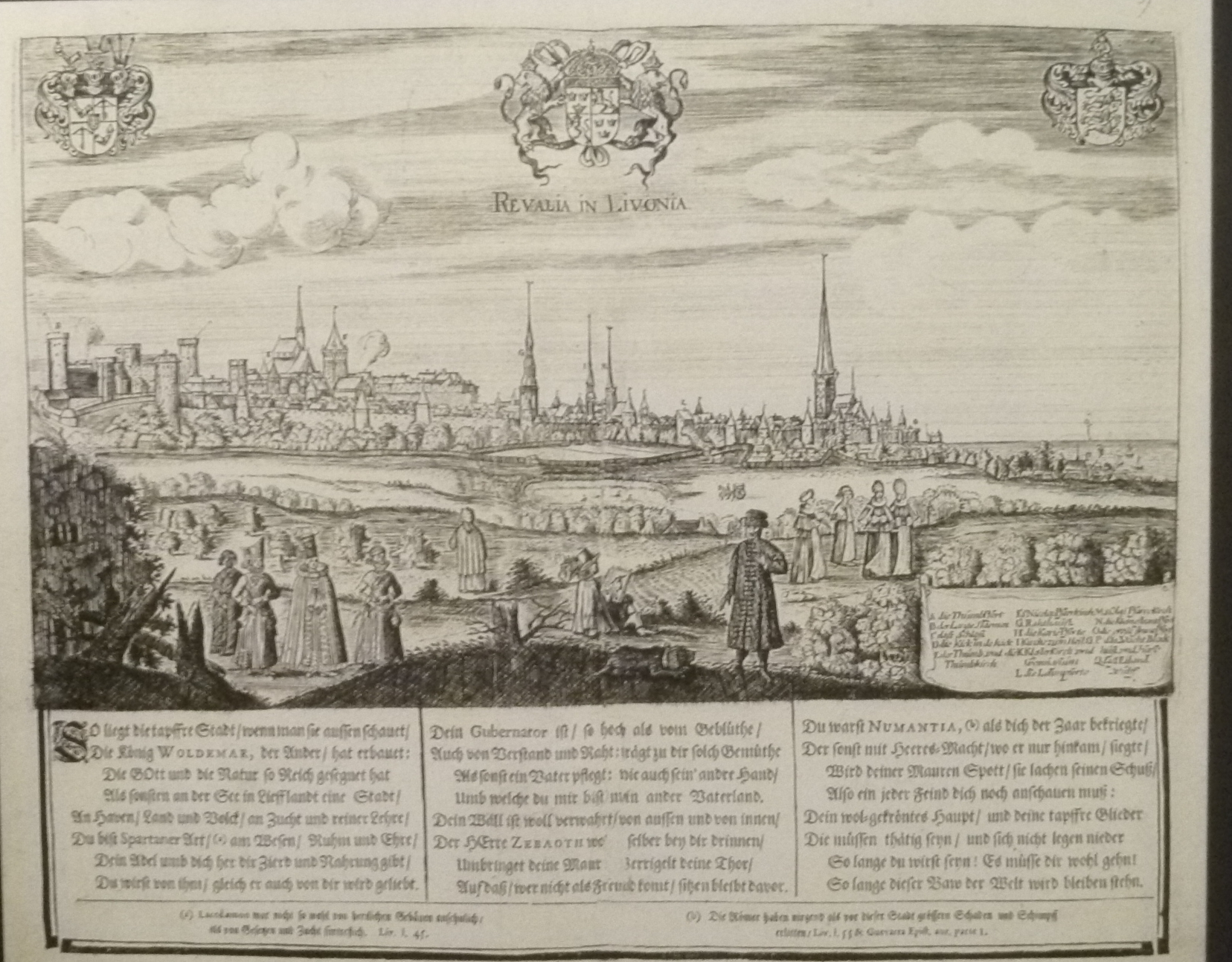
View of St Nicholas' Church and Reval (modern day Tallinn) by Adam Olearius

=== Battle of Obermühlenberg ===
With Pernau being taken by Oldenbokum, a smaller force from the city marched towards Reval, and after a while established camp near Töwesbrücken, around four miles from Reval. At this time, Horn received reinforcements consisting of around one Fähnlein of knights and a banner of Finnish cavalry. To avoid fighting the Swedes in open battle, the mercenaries pulled back. Meanwhile, Oldenbokum received large reinforcements and marched off towards Reval with around 1,017 men, 27 knights, and 6 banners of cavalry. Oldenbokum arrived in front of Reval on 11 August and established camp outside the city in a forest in Obermühlenberg to begin a siege of the city. Two days later, when Oldenbokum was having a party in his camp, Horn decided to commit to a sortie with three Fähnleins and 800 knights; the engagement would be known as the Battle of Obermühlenberg. Oldenbokum was forced to pull back from the fighting, but was killed in the Swedish pursuit.

With Oldenbokum's death, his forces collapsed, apart from the garrison in Pernau which would later hand the city over to the Polish troops.

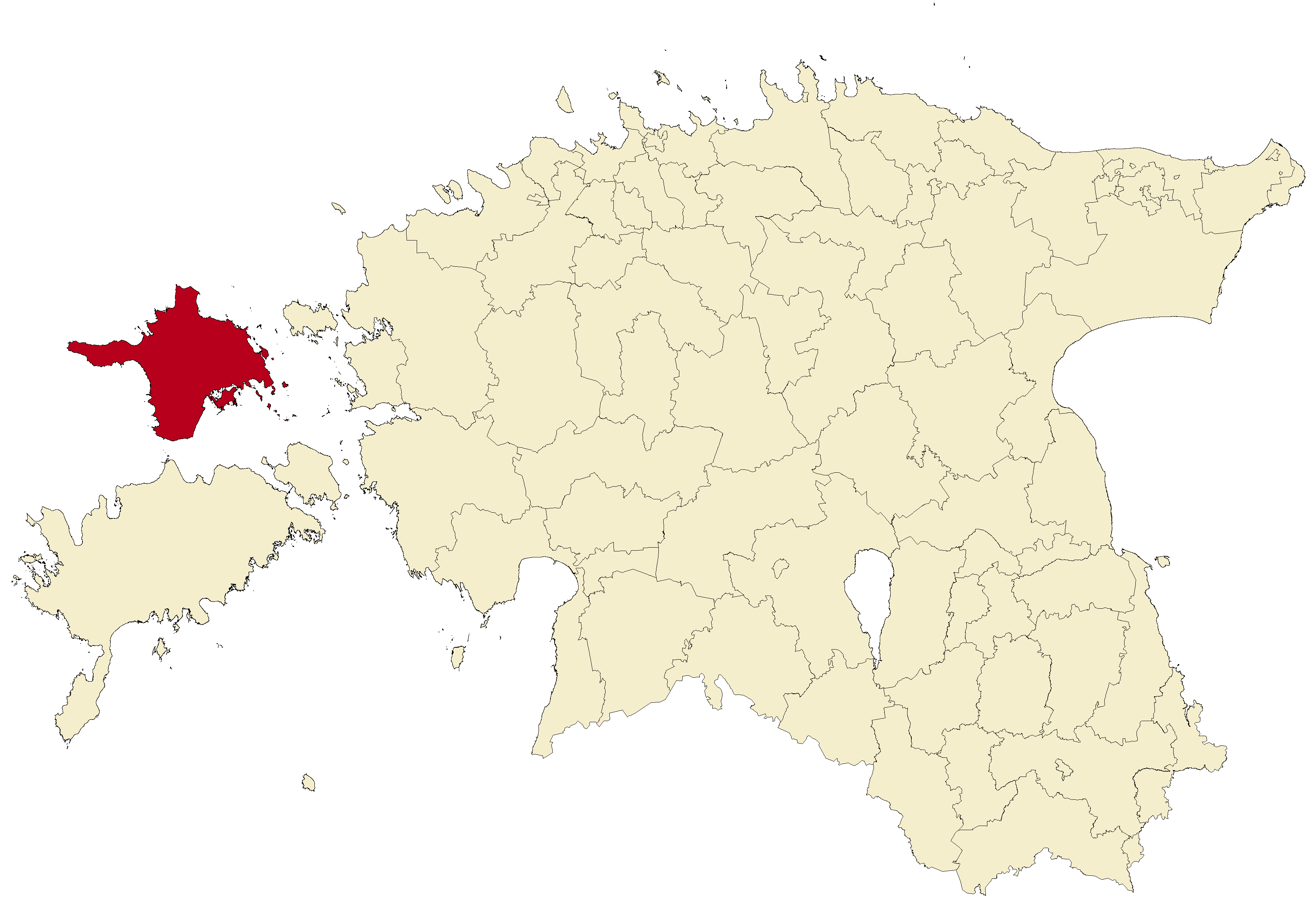
Map of Dagö (Hiiumaa) in red

To exploit his victory, Horn decided to strike against the weakest point of Danish Estonia, the island of Dagö (modern day Hiiumaa). While the neighbouring island of Ösel was well defended by troops and burghers, Ösel was badly defended in comparison. Without much fighting, the Swedes were able to occupy the island; parts of Horn's forces were to stay on the island and defend it on Eric's behalf. Moreover, the loss of Dagö would not be the only Danish loss in the year.

According to the alliance treaty between Denmark and Poland, Pernau was to be given to Denmark if the Poles were able to recapture it from the Swedes; but its garrison of pro-Polish mercenaries refused to hand over neither the city or its castle to the Danes. This refusal increased the mistrust between Denmark and its eastern allies. Three weeks before Christmas, Horn marched out of Reval and cleared the countryside from raiders, before attacking Pernau; due to the lack of artillery, he initiated a blockade to starve the city.

== 1566 ==
In March, the Polish king, Sigismund II Augustus, forced Henrik Klasson Horn to lift his blockade of Pernau. A Polish army was sent to relieve the city and Horn decided not to meet it in battle and pulled back and instead marched to Ösel. Duke Magnus, who was the lord on the island, had supported Oldenbokums attack against Reval, and Horn wanted revenge.

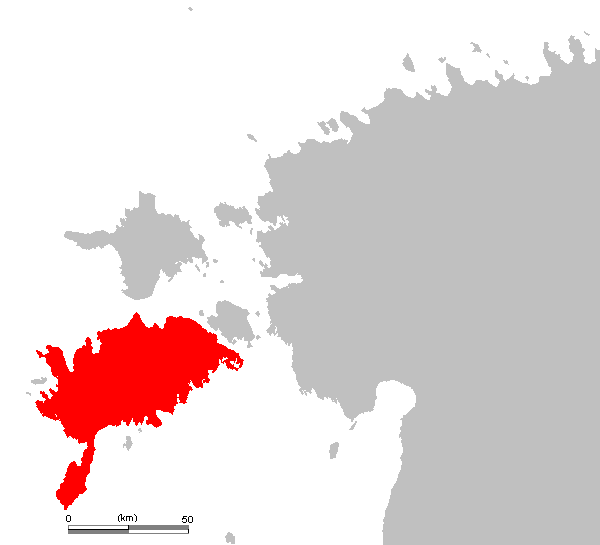
Map of Ösel (Saaremaa) in red

When Horn landed, the Swedes raided and devastated the entire island and the city of Arensburg (Kuressaare) was ransomed. Frederick II sent support to relieve the island which was prevented by the numerically superior Swedish navy. The Swedes would leave the island with a large amount of loot. When the Swedes were back in mainland Estonia, they were attacked by the Polish force that was originally going to relieve Pernau. A part of the loot from Ösel was taken and the Poles make raids in the nearby areas. In June, the Danes attempted a revenge attack against Dagö but the expedition ended in failure with heavy casualties for the Danes.

In the Summer, the Poles made further fruitless attempts to capture the Swedish fortress of Karkus. A surprise attack in June failed and on 25 July the Poles returned to Karkus with around 4,000 men. When Horn marched towards Karkus to relieve it from the Polish siege, they made a retreat to avoid battle with the Swedes on 10 October.

After the relief of Karkus, Horn went to Sweden in November and met with the king to prepare for future fighting. After deliberating with the king for several days, he was sent back to Estonia on 4 December with the task of retaking Pernau or to ravage the Diocese of Riga, the latter being intended to prevent a Polish attack into Swedish territory. Subsequently, he began to fulfill his instructions; he sent Clas Kursell to pillage the Diocese of Riga, where he won a small victory at Lemsal (Limbaži) after he surprised a Polish force. More Swedish attempts were also made to retake Pernau. The Swedes planned to retake the city by bribing its inhabitants to hand it over. The Swedes expected that 10,000 riksdaler given to the city's commanders would solve their problem. The Danes destroyed the fortresses of Sonnenburg and Arensburg (Kuressaare), likely believing they lacked enough forces to defend them both.

== 1567 ==
In the beginning of the year, in retaliation for the Swedish raids into the Diocese of Riga, the Polish Colonel Talwos attacked Swedish territory with a force of Lithuanians in January. In response to this, both Henrik Klasson Horn and Clas Kursell marched out to meet the Polish–Lithuanian advance.

=== Battle of Runafer ===
On 3 February, the Swedes, along with parts of the Estonian nobility, suffered a crushing defeat at Runafer. The input from the nobility in the battle was described as "mediocre" and as a result their casualties are reported as very high. The Swedish losses are likely to have reached 2,000. During the battle, the knight Johann Maydell Goswinsson was captured. Talwos was not able to exploit his victory due to a lack of resources. Horn was blamed for the defeat at Runafer, and was replaced as commander of the Swedish forces in Estonia by Clas Kursell. With this, the campaigning for the year was over.

== 1568 ==
At the start of the year, Eric immediately drew up new plans for the war. Hans Boije of Gennäs was sent to Kursell, bringing with him 8,000 Riksdaler and instructions to attack Pernau or Arensburg on Ösel. To support the attacks, Eric sent a fleet of 18 ships to Estonia, under the command of Peder Larsson Sjöblad. Sjöblad repelled a Danish fleet that was threatening Reval while bringing away merchant ships, before landing Kursell and his men on Ösel on 25 July. The Danish commander of Sonnenburg, Reinhold Zöge, quickly surrendered to the Swedes. The Swedes continued the reconstruction of Sonnenburg which the Danes had previously been working on. Kursell also entered into a truce with the other commanders on Ösel.

Following Kursell's truce, people from Pernau began raiding Swedish territory. The Poles caught the Swedish force, which had been reinforced with nobility from Harrien, by surprise; Hans Boije was captured and the nobility suffered heavy casualties.

On August 27, 1568, Polish ships, stopping in the Pomeranian Darłowo for food and water, they unexpectedly came across three Swedish ships standing in the port. After a brief battle, the enemy vessels were captured. A significant amount of ammunition, gunpowder, weapons, and 8 cannons were seized.

=== Deposition of Eric XIV ===
During the autumn, Eric was deposed by both Duke Charles and Duke John, with the immediate consequence being that fighting between Sweden and Poland ceased. The new king, John III, saw a problem in Estonia; some of the more important people there had previously announced themselves as enemies of John in the conflict between him and Eric. John feared that they would defect to other countries with their castles, but this did not occur.

== Aftermath ==
Despite no formal peace treaty being signed, the warfare between Poland and Sweden would end when John III was crowned as King of Sweden, and the Northern Seven Years' War would continue for two more years until the Treaty of Stettin was signed on 13 December 1570.

== See also ==
- Swedish expedition to Livonia – Swedish invasion of Livonia in 1562
