= North Vidzeme Biosphere Reserve =

Protected area in Latvia

UNESCO World Heritage Site
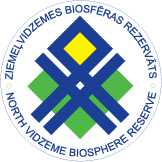
- The North Vidzeme Biosphere Reserve

- Location within Latvia
- Official name: Ziemeļvidzemes Biosfēras Rezervāts
- Location: Vidzeme, Latvia
- Criteria: Natural: (ix), (x)
- Reference: 145808
- Inscription: 1997 (21st Session)
- Area: 4,755.14 km^{2} (1,835.97 sq mi)
- Coordinates: 57°33′33″N 24°33′33″E

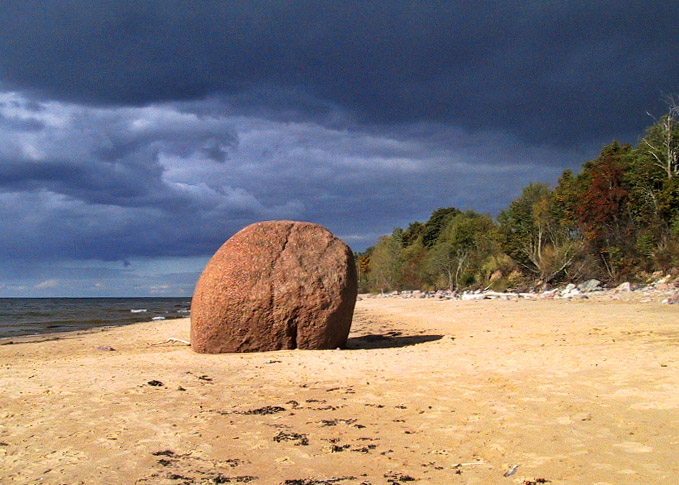
Lauci stone on Vidzeme beach, North Vidzeme Biosphere Reserve

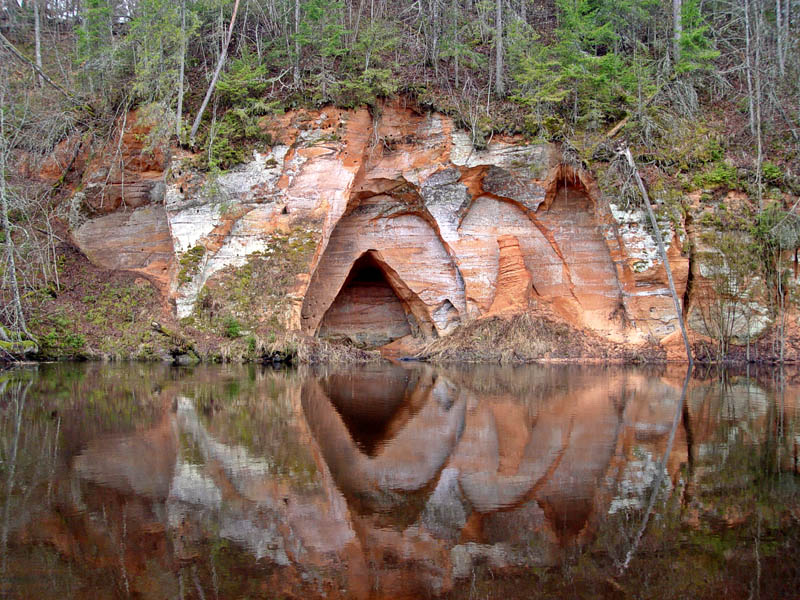
Angel's cave (Eņģeļu ala) on the Salaca River, North Vidzeme Biosphere Reserve

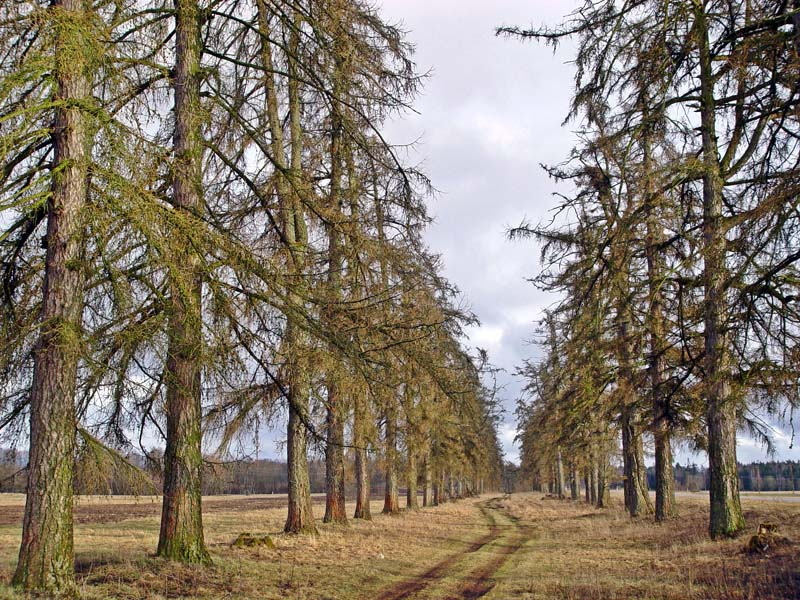
Historical larch causeway near Matisi village, North Vidzeme Biosphere Reserve

The North Vidzeme Biosphere Reserve (NVBR) (Latvian: Ziemeļvidzemes biosfēras rezervāts) is the only biosphere reserve in Latvia, located in the northern Vidzeme region in north-western Latvia along the border with Estonia. The reserve includes varied natural and semi-natural habitats in primal and traditional landscapes. NVBR includes 25 nature reserves, one nature park and two marine protected territories.

NVBR generates nature tourism via the river Salaca, which starts its 95 km long journey from Lake Burtnieks and ends in the Baltic Sea.

== History ==
In 1990, the North Vidzeme regional nature conservation complex was created by the Latvian government, on the border of the present biosphere reserve. An administration was created in Salacgrīva which started active planning for the creation of the first biosphere reserve in the country. The new protected area encompassed approximately 6% of the total area of Latvia, including multiple towns, industrial and infrastructural objects.

The North Vidzeme Biosphere Reserve was officially created on 11 December 1997. Since its creation, it has been internationally recognized in the UNESCO Man and the Biosphere Programme. It also became part of the World Network of Biosphere Reserves.

In the beginning, the central administration was located in the seaside town of Salacgrīva in a renovated historical building with a staff of 11 members. Staff members were posted in various parts of the reserve. Twelve years later, in 2009, the administration of the Biosphere Reserve was integrated into the Nature Conservation Agency of Latvia. In 2011, the administration of the Nature Conservation Agency of Latvia (NCAL) was reorganized. In 2013, a co-ordinator for the Biosphere Reserve was appointed.

The Vidzeme Regional Administration (VRA) includes large areas like the Gauja National Park, the North Vidzeme biosphere reserve and other protected landscape areas and strict reserves.

Consultancy council now consists of 24 members, who represent various local municipalities, governmental institutions and NGOs.

== Main statistics ==
- Population: 49591 in 2017
- Coordinates: 57°20' to 58°10' N; 24°20' to 26°00' E
- Total area: 4 576 square kilometers (roughly 6% of Latvia), of which:
  - Sanctuaries: 184,4 square kilometers
  - Landscape protection zones: 1 600 square kilometers
  - Neutral zones: 1 625,6 square kilometers
  - Sea littoral until the depth of 10 m: 1 160 square kilometers
- Height above sea level: 0 – 127 m
- Main ecosystems: temperate coniferous and mixed forests. High bogs, coastal dunes, coastal meadows, pristine beaches, natural lakes and streams, sandstone cliffs.

== Tourism ==
Popular tourist spots in the North Vidzeme Biosphere Reserve include:

- The Salaca River - a river that flows through the reserve and is surrounded by sandstone cliffs and cave.s
- Vidzeme Beach - a beach with sandstone cliffs, waterfalls and boulders.
- Burtnieks Lake - the 4th largest lake in Latvia.
- Seda swamp and area - this area contains viewing towers for bird watching that have been set up on the edge of the swamp.
- Nature trails
