= Seda (river) =

River in Latvia

Seda River
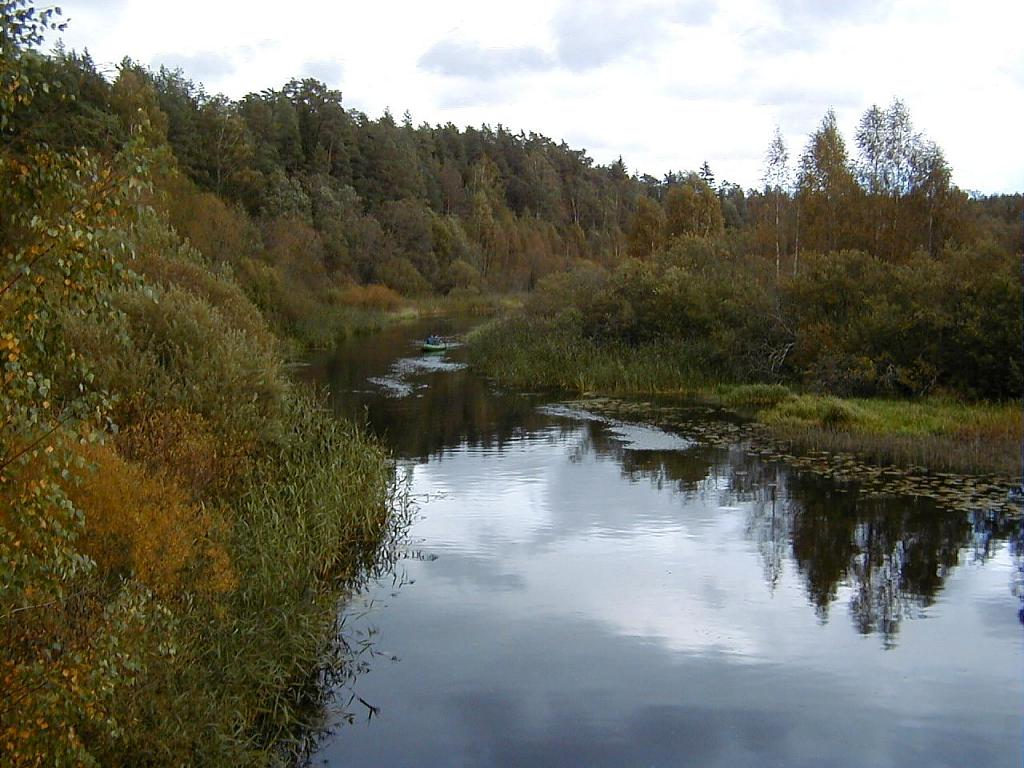

Location
- Country: Latvia

Physical characteristics
- Mouth: Lake Burtnieks
  - coordinates: 57°46′05″N 25°14′47″E
- Length: 62 km

The Seda River (Estonian: Säde River) is a river in Latvia. The river is 62 km long. The river flows into Lake Burtnieks.

Historians suggest that in the Middle Ages the Säde River was the border between Estonia and Latvia.
