= Salaca =

River in Latvia and Estonia

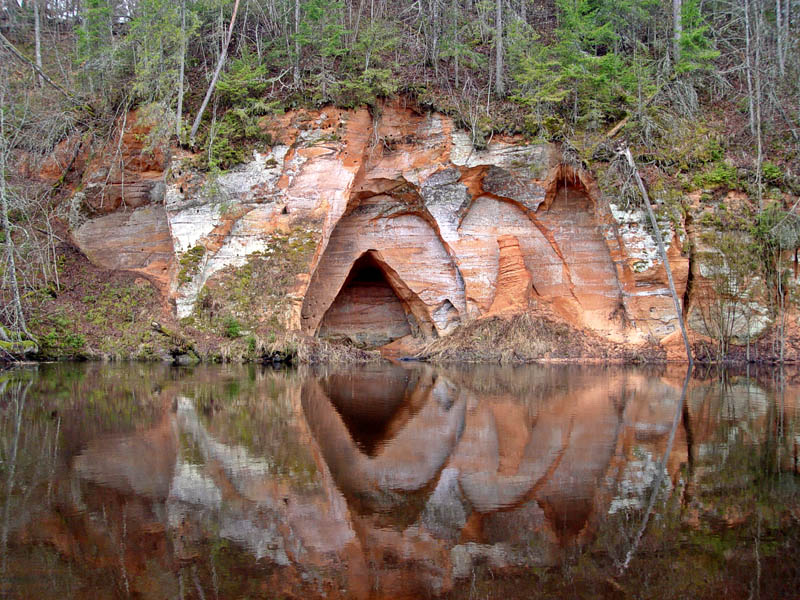
- Angels' Cave, Salaca

Location
- Countries: Latvia; Estonia

Physical characteristics
- Source
  - location: Lake Burtnieks
  - elevation: 42 m (138 ft)
- Mouth
  - location: Gulf of Riga, Baltic Sea
- Length: 95 km (59 mi)
- Basin size: 3,421 km^{2} (1,321 sq mi)(Latvia 3,239 km^{2} or 1,251 sq mi)
- Discharge
  - average: 1.06 km^{3}/a (34 m^{3}/s; 1,190 cu ft/s)

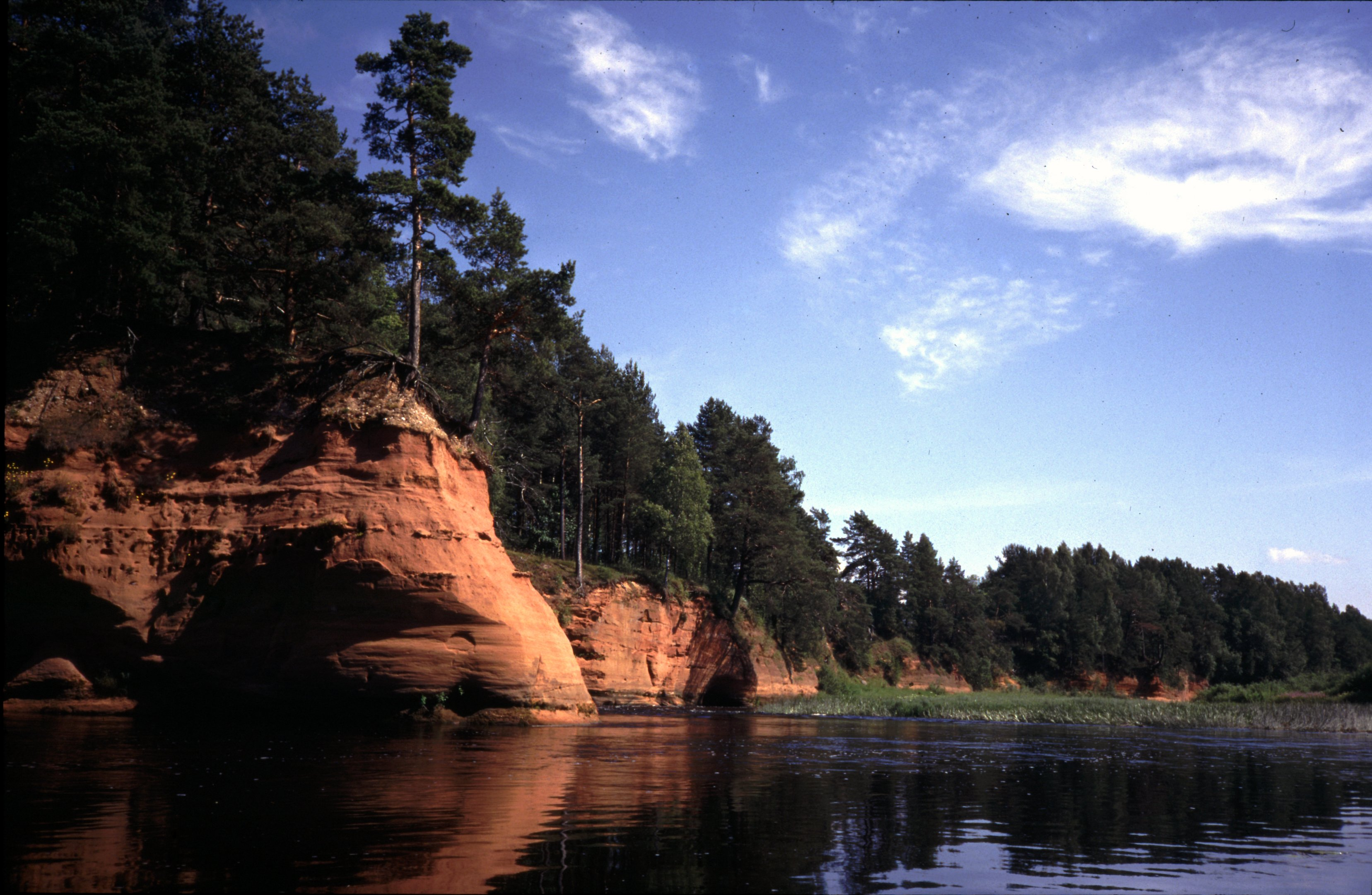
Devonian red sandstone cliffs at the river's bank

The Salaca (Estonian: Salatsi jõgi) is a river in northern Latvia. It flows from Lake Burtnieks in Vidzeme, 90 km, to the Gulf of Riga. The river flows through three towns, Mazsalaca, Staicele and Salacgrīva. The riverbanks feature Devonian red sandstone cliffs, and many caves and rapids as well. The river gives its name to a dialect of Livonian (Salaca Livonian) spoken on its upper banks into the 19th century, which is today extinct.

== Catchment and hydrology ==
The Salaca River basin is the fifth largest in Latvia, covering 3,421 km^{2} in the north-east of the country, of which 62 per cent lies within Lake Burtnieks (surface area 40.06 km^{2}; water renewal six to seven times per year). From the lake's only outlet, the Salaca flows 95 km north-west to the Gulf of Riga, with a long-term mean discharge of 33 m^{3}/s and a gentle slope of approximately 0.4 m/km. The basin experiences a cool temperate climate, with mean annual temperatures of 4.0–5.5 °C, mean January and July temperatures of –5.0 °C and 17 °C respectively, and annual precipitation of 600–800 mm. Underlain by weakly cemented Middle Devonian sandstone and overlain by up to 40 m of Quaternary glacial and alluvial deposits, the catchment supports a mosaic of sod-podzolic, gleysol and alluvial soils. Land cover comprises roughly 40 per cent agriculture, 30 per cent forest and 12 per cent bog. Since 1997 the basin has formed part of the North Vidzeme Biosphere Reserve, with Lake Burtnieks included in UNESCO's Man and the Biosphere Programme.

From 1961 to 1990, the METQ2007BDOPT model (a conceptual rainfall–runoff model) was used to recreate daily flow rates in the Salaca basin. It drew on daily readings of air temperature, rainfall and how dry the air was (vapour-pressure deficit) from six weather stations, and matched these against actual river levels measured at four gauging sites. Across the main sub-basins, the model's performance was good: efficiency scores (Nash–Sutcliffe R^{2}) ranged from 0.51 to 0.76, and correlation values (r) from 0.75 to 0.88. Such results show the model can reliably support studies of river behaviour, water management and flood forecasting in the Salaca catchment.

== Climate change and salmonid populations ==
Over more than fifty years of daily monitoring (1964–2017), the Salaca River has shown clear warming outside of midsummer: average water temperatures rose significantly in autumn, winter and spring, even as early summer values dipped slightly. At the same time, winter and summer discharges increased in step with higher precipitation and earlier snowmelt, shortening the cold season and altering flow regimes.

These shifts in river conditions have been mirrored by changes in salmonid life cycles. Salmon parr (freshwater juveniles) now grow more slowly during warmer summers, reaching smaller sizes by late August, yet by the time they smoltify—preparing to migrate to sea—they are larger on average than in past decades. The smolt run itself has moved earlier in the year, become shorter and more intense, and is now dominated by one-year-old fish. Overall smolt production, particularly of sea trout, has risen compared to the 1960s.
