= Hans Boije af Gennäs =

Swedish military leader (died 1573)

- Born: Finland
- Died: 1 January 1573
- Military career
- Allegiance: Sweden
- Commands: Weissenstein

Hans Boije af Gennäs (died 1 January 1573) was a Finnish-born Swedish commander for the fortification at Weissenstein in present-day Paide in Estonia, during the time of the Nordic twentyfive year war start.

Boije af Gennäs and Herman Fleming on 21 August 1570 stopped an attack by Danish forces initiated by Russia about Weissenstein, on 27 December 1572 Weissenstein was attacked again by Russian forces, on 1 January 1573 the fortification was taken and Boije af Gennäs and his closest men were arrested.

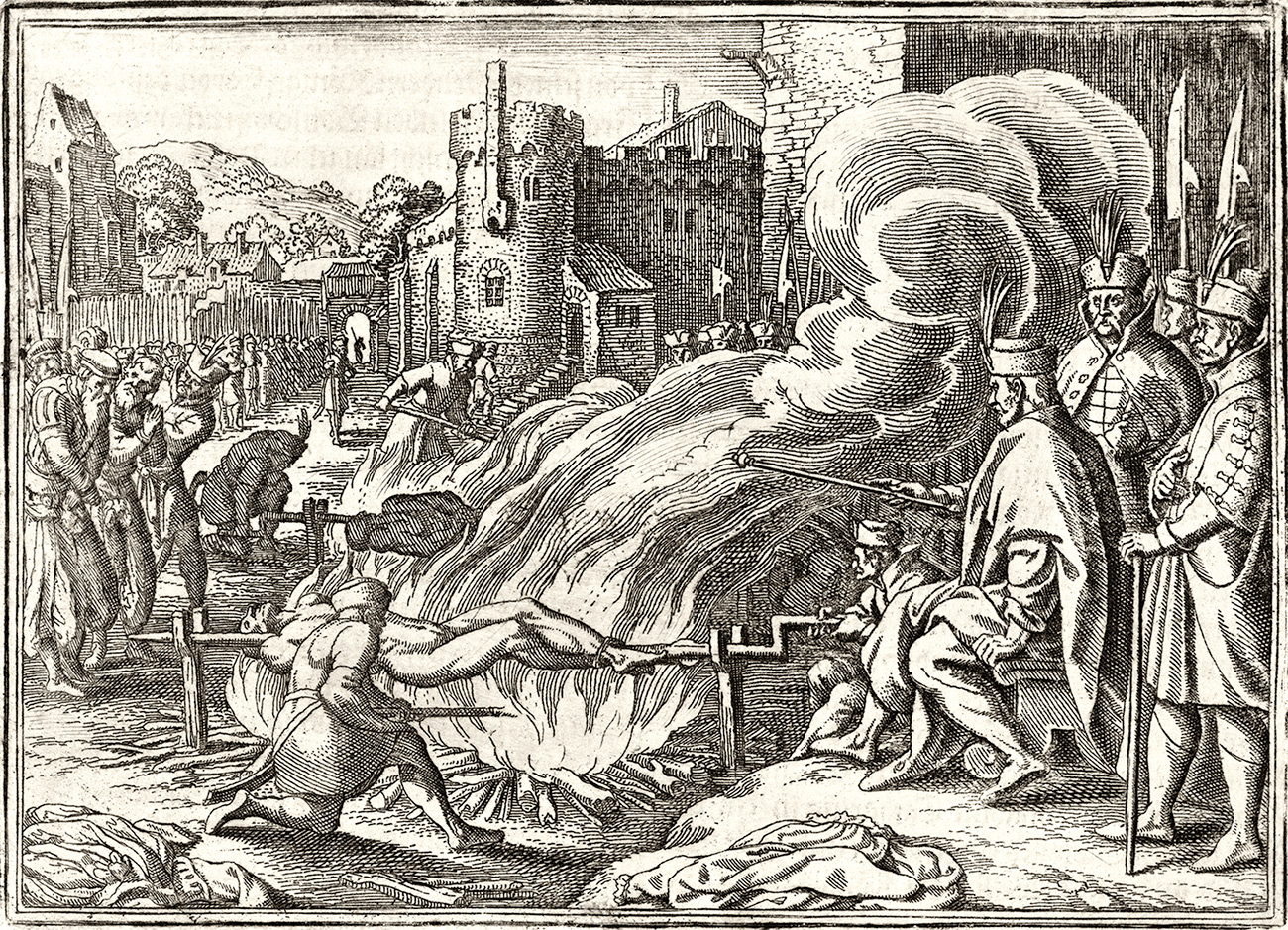

They were all executed by being placed on spears and slowly fried to death over an open fire.
