= Burtnieki =

Village in Latvia

Coordinates: 57°41′41″N 25°16′30″E

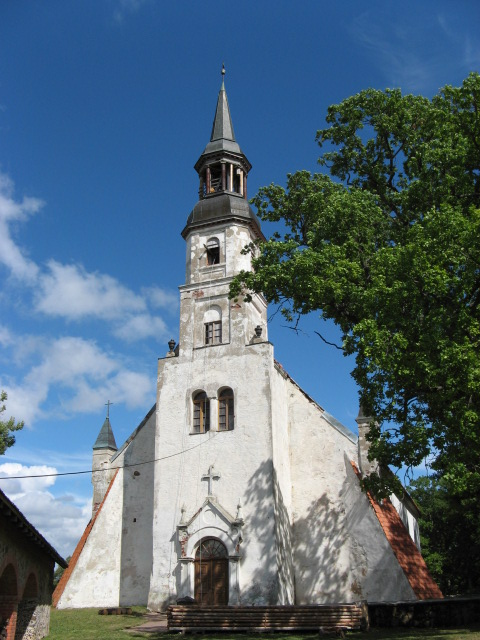

Burtnieki (German: Burtneck) is a village (population 488) in Burtnieki Parish, Valmiera Municipality, in the Vidzeme region of Latvia, near Lake Burtnieks. Administrative centre of Burtnieki Parish. Burtnieki was first mentioned in the Livonian Chronicle of Henry in 1208 and has several historic sites: Burtnieki castle-ruins, Burtnieki manor and Burtnieki church.

== Burtnieki castle and manor ==
Burtnieki was a site of a Livonian Order castle, built in 1284. The house was burned down in the 16th century, during the Livonian War. A part of stone wall on the Southern side remains.

In the 14th century, a manor estate was built near the castle ruins, on the bank of Lake Burtnieks. In 1860s, baron J.F. von Schroder created a park near the estate (now known as the Burtnieki park) with about 70 species of trees and bushes.

== Lutheran church of Burtnieki ==
The Lutheran church of Burtnieki is located on the Eastern bank of the lake. The first church was built there in 1234. It was a Catholic church, built from wood. It burned down and was replaced by a stone wall church between 1283-1287. It was destroyed in 1654, during the Polish-Russian War.

The current church was built in 1688. Near the church is located a minister estate building complex, renovated in 1992. The estate building has been defined as a protected architectural monument.

== Horse farm of Burtnieki ==
Burtnieki has a horse-farm, first established in 1941. Several notable horses have been bred here. Burtnieki-bred horse Rusty, with the rider Ulla Salzgeber of Germany, won bronze medal in individual dressage and gold medal in team dressage in 2000 Summer Olympics. After Olympics, Rusty and Ulla Salzgeber have won two European Championships (in 2001 and 2003) and World Cup.

The former "Briedes" pub (built in 1840) hosts a horse breeding and agriculture museum. It was one of the sites of 2000 European Heritage Days.

== Burtnieki school ==
Burtnieki school was established in 1685 and was one of the first 15 rural schools in Latvia. It is currently known as Burtnieki Auseklis Secondary School.
