= Lake Burtnieks =

Lake in Latvia

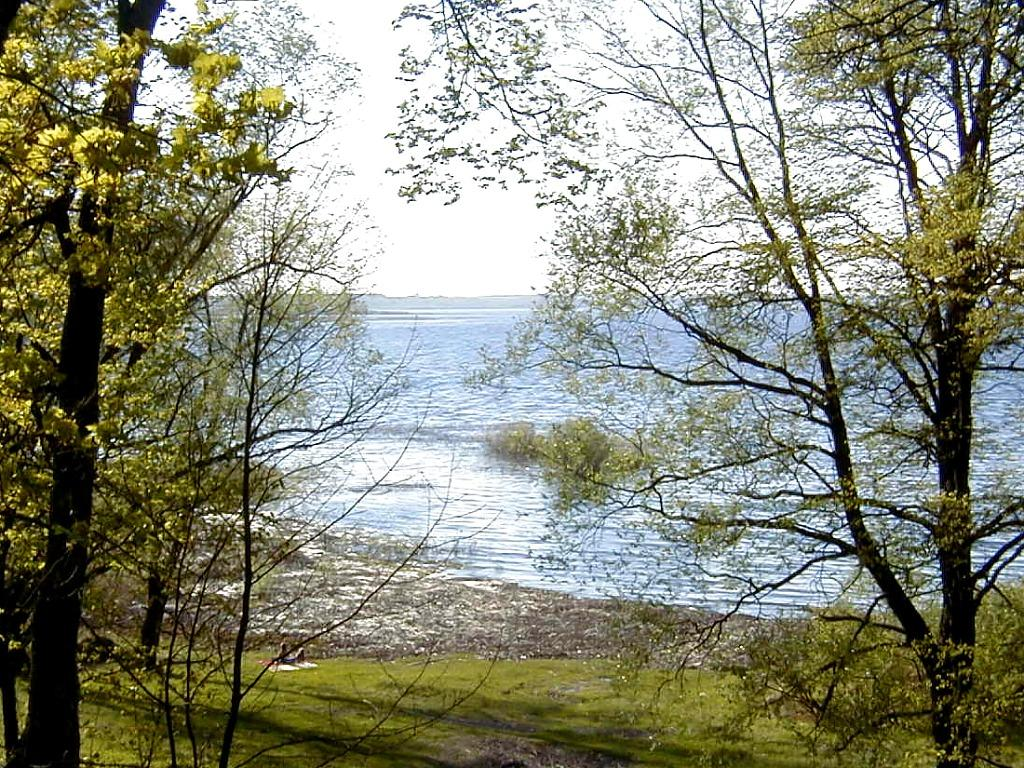

- Location within Latvia
- Coordinates: 57°44′N 25°14′E
- Primary outflows: Salaca
- Catchment area: 2,215 km^{2} (855 sq mi)
- Basin countries: Latvia, Estonia
- Max. length: 13.3 km (8.3 mi)
- Max. width: 5.5 km (3.4 mi)
- Average depth: 2.4 m (7 ft 10 in)
- Max. depth: 3.3 m (11 ft)
- Water volume: 91.1×10^{6} m^{3} (3.22×10^{9} cu ft)
- Islands: 3

Lake Burtnieks (Latvian: Burtnieka ezers, Estonian: Asti järv) is the fourth largest lake in Latvia. It is shallow with an average depth of 2.9 m. The lake bed is mainly sandy, in places a little muddy. In the southeast part of the lake there is Devonian sandstone rock. The lake has 17 species of fish, such as minnows, salmon, chubs, eels, and pike, and there are areas for duck hunting. The banks are shallow and sandy, but along the southern coast, waves have carved sandstone cliffs. After the regulation of the Salaca river in 1929, the lake level dropped by a metre, and many of the exposed shallows grew covered with reeds and algae. The lake contains three islands with a total area of 14,000 m^{2}. The lake lies entirely within the Northern Vidzeme Biosphere Reserve. Small streams from Latvia and Estonia; the Aunupīte, Bauņupīte, Briedes upe, Dūres upe, Ēķinupe, Rūjas upe, and Sedas upe flow into the lake. Lake Burtnieks is the source of 95 km long Salaca river, which flows out of the northwest corner into the Gulf of Riga. In ancient times, the lake was known as Astijärv or Aster, when northern Vidzeme was inhabited by the Livonian people. The lake is a major setting of the Latvian national epic Lāčplēsis, and appears in many Latvian folklore stories. A few small villages cling to the coast today, the largest of which is Burtnieki. The Zvejnieki burial ground is a major archaeological site by the northern shore.
