= Lake Alūksne =

Lake in Latvia

- Alūksnes ezers (Latvian)
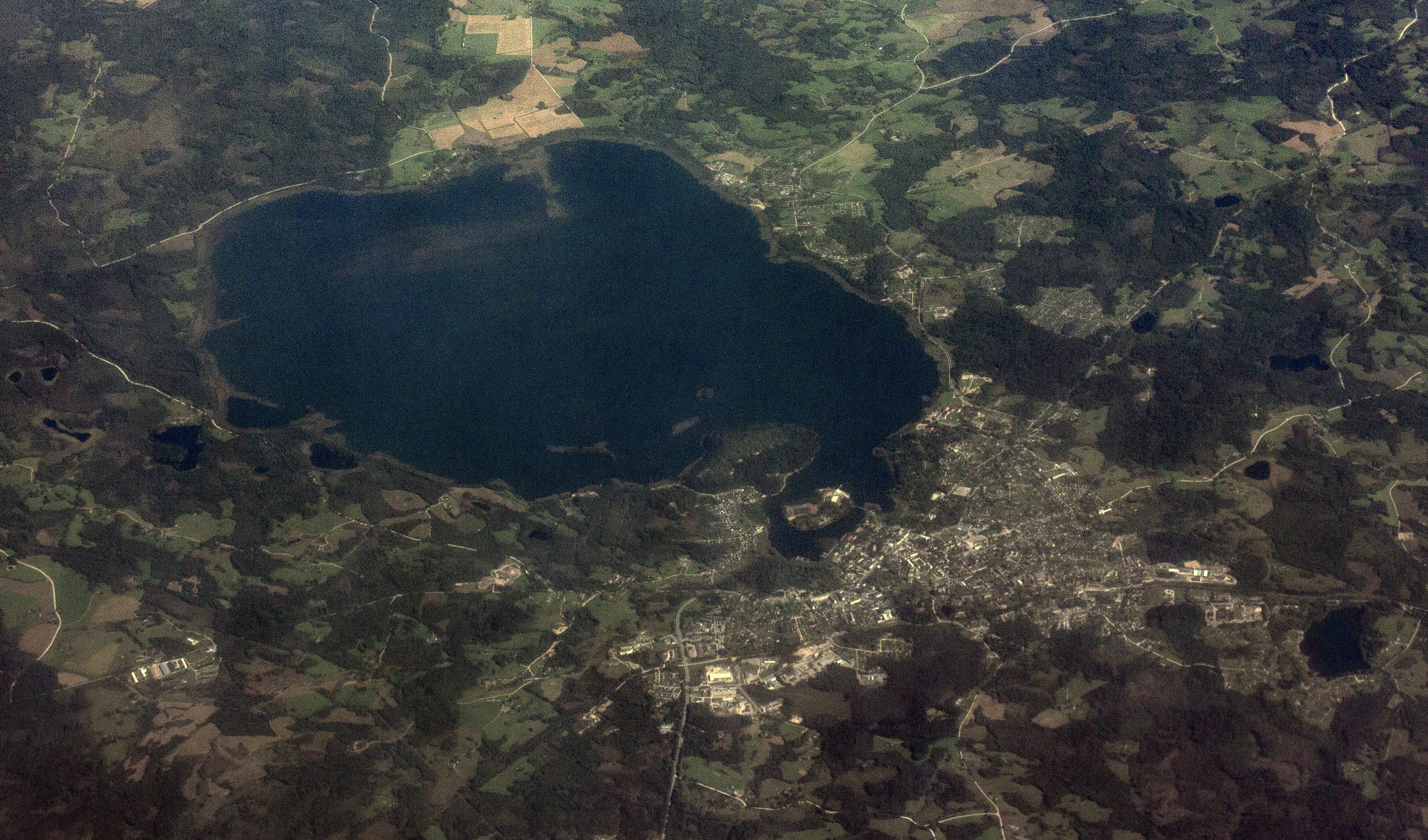
- Aerial view to the lake

- Location within Latvia
- Coordinates: 57°27′N 27°05′E
- River sources: Alūksne River
- Catchment area: 28 square kilometres (11 sq mi)
- Basin countries: Latvia
- Max. length: 6.6 kilometres (4.1 mi)
- Surface area: 15.437 km^{2} (5.960 sq mi)
- Average depth: 7.1 m (23 ft)
- Max. depth: 15.2 m (50 ft)
- Surface elevation: 183.7 metres (603 ft)
- Islands: 4
- Settlements: Alūksne

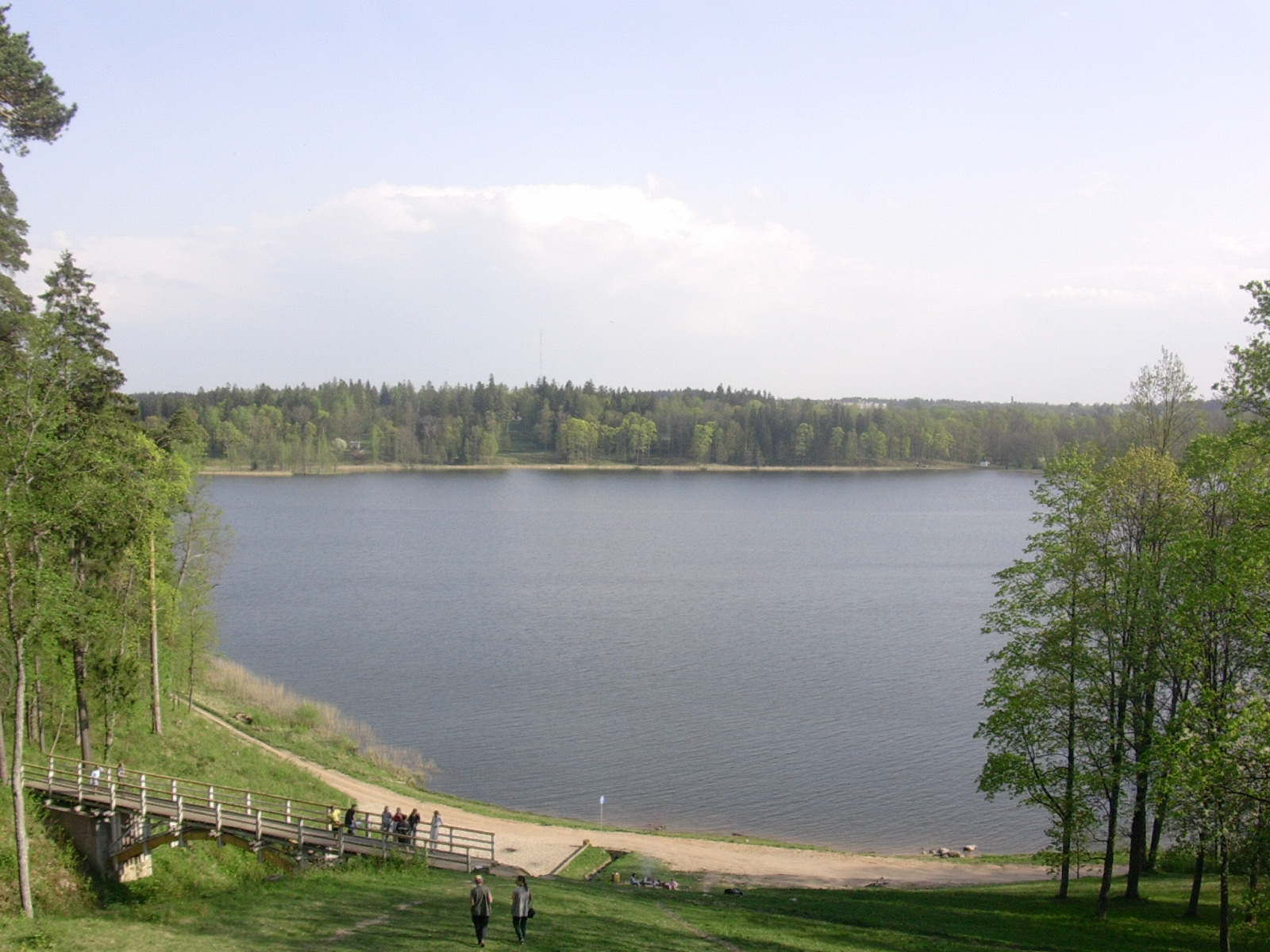
Lake Alūksne

Lake Alūksne (Latvian: Alūksnes ezers) is located in Alūksne Municipality, Latvia.

The city of Alūksne is located by the lake.

Lake Aluksne is the 11th biggest lake in Latvia (15.437 km^{2}). At its deepest the lake is 15.2 m deep, but the average depth is 7.1 m.

The lake contains twelve different species of fish.

There are four islands within Lake Aluksne. The ruins of historic Alūksne Castle are on the largest island (known as Castle Island or St. Mary's Island, because the castle was originally called Marienburg, "St. Mary's Castle").

Alūksne River (a tributary of Pededze) flows out of the lake.
