= Narrow-gauge railways in Latvia =

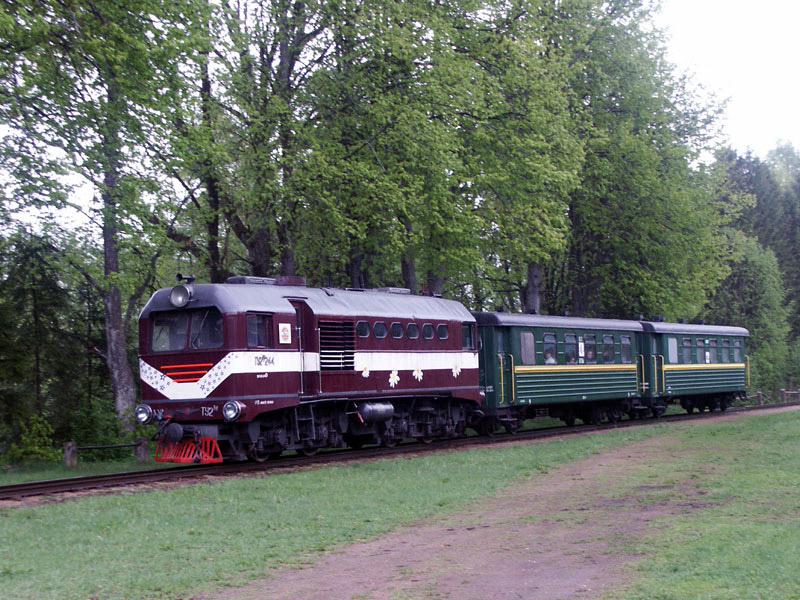
Narrow-gauge train at Alūksne

Around 1935, Latvian narrow-gauge railways consisted of 536 km (335 miles) of 600 mm (1 ft 11 5/8 in) gauge, 432 km (270 miles) of 750 mm (2 ft 5 1/2 in) gauge, and 48 km (30 miles) of meter gauge.

One public, one museum, and some industrial peat railways survive.

== Common carrier ==
Track gauges were 750 mm (2 ft 5 1/2 in) gauge unless otherwise specified.

- First Russian Supply Railway Company
- Valka–Rūjiena–Mõisaküla–Pärnu, branch of the Gulbene Line
- Liepāja–Alsunga line, 67 km (42 mi), opened in 1932, extended to Kuldīga (67 km; 42 mi)
- Liepāja–Rucava line, 52 km (32 mi), 600 mm (1 ft 11 5/8 in) narrow-gauge military line, converted to 750 mm (2 ft 5 1/2 in) narrow gauge
- Liepāja–Aizpute railway, 48 km (30 mi)
- Livonian Supply Railway Company
  - Gulbene line, Pļaviņas–Gulbene–Alūksne–Ape–Mõniste–Valga, 212 km (132 mi), opened in 1903, partially closed in stages, leaving only the 33 km (21 mi) Gulbene–Alūksne Railway still open.
- Pāle–Staicele, 16 km (9.9 mi), opened 1927
- Puikule–Aloja, 12 km (7.5 mi).
- Riisselja–Ainaži, 76 km (47 mi), closed 1975.
- Valmiera supply railway company, 600 mm (1 ft 11 5/8 in) gauge, 1912:
  - Valmiera–Smiltene, 32 km (20 mi), closed 1969.
  - Valmiera–Ainaži Harbour, 83 km (52 mi), closed in 1979.

== Peat railway ==
The peat companies mainly use 750 mm (2 ft 5 1/2 in) gauge, but 700 mm (2 ft 3 9/16 in) and 600 mm (1 ft 11 5/8 in) gauge were also used.

- Peat railway based at Ozoli
- Peat railway based at Seda
- Peat railway based at Misa
- Peat railway based at Puikule
- Peat railway based at Zilaiskalns
- Peat railway based at Strūžāni
- Peat railway based at Līvāni
- Peat railway based at Baloži, 28 km (17 mi), closed in 2011 and now operates passenger trains on some Saturdays.

== Other ==
- There is an historic train in Ventspils. The track gauge is 600 mm (1 ft 11 5/8 in) and the length is a 1.3 km (0.81 mi) circle and a branch. The locomotives are former Brigadelok steam locomotives built for the German army. From 1918 until the early 1960s they ran a regular service from Ventspils along the coast to Mazirbe and further down to Talsi and Stende.
- The Riga Pioneer Railway, 2 km (1.2 mi) long, was in existence from 1956 to 1997.
