= Vietinghoff =

Vietinghoff is a surname. Notable people with the surname include:

- Egon von Vietinghoff (1903–1994), German-Swiss painter, author and philosopher, son of Jeanne
- Heinrich von Vietinghoff (1887–1952), German general of the Wehrmacht during World War II
- Jeanne de Vietinghoff (1875–1926), Belgian writer, mother of Egon

== See also ==
- Baron Boris Vietinghoff-Scheel (c. 1829-1901), Russian composer
