= Alūksne New Castle =

Castle in Latvia

- Vidzeme, Latvia
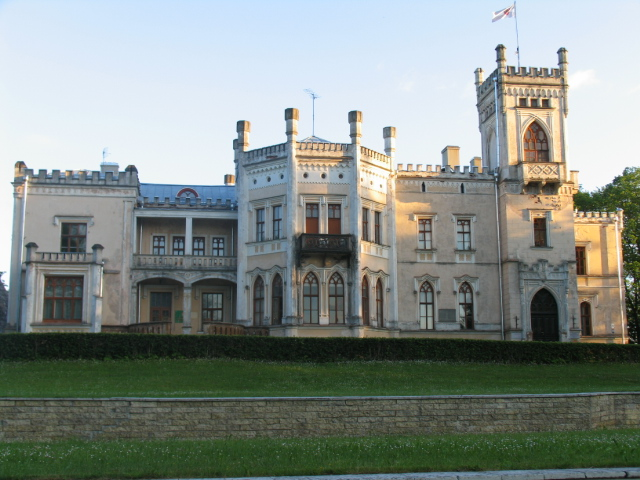
- Alūksne New Castle

Site information
- Type: Castle
- Open to the public: yes

Location
- Coordinates: 57.42280°N 27.05417°E

Site history
- Materials: brick

The Alūksne New Castle, also referred to as the Alūksne new Palace, is a palace in Alūksne, in the Vidzeme region of Latvia. It was built between 1859 and 1864 by baron and Privy Councillor Alexander von Vietinghoff in the Tudor Revival style.

The Vietinghoff family has been connected with Alūksne since the fourteenth century, when an Arnold von Vietinghoff became the Commander of the local Teutonic castle. Since the mid-18th century the town was a barony in the Russian Empire and became one of the main summer residences of the Vietinghoffs in the Baltics after their manor in Zolitūde was sold in 1795. The name "New Palace" might arise because of a comparison with the old 18th-century manor complex which was located nearby, both buildings being on the Western end of a small landscape park.

After the Vietinghoffs left Alūksne around 1918, the building became an army base during the Latvian War of Independence and later served as the headquarters of the Seventh Sigulda Infantry Regiment. In subsequent decades, it was used for various Soviet cultural institutions, and, since 1959, has been the home of the local museum.
