= Gulbene–Alūksne Railway =

Narrow-gauge railway line in Latvia

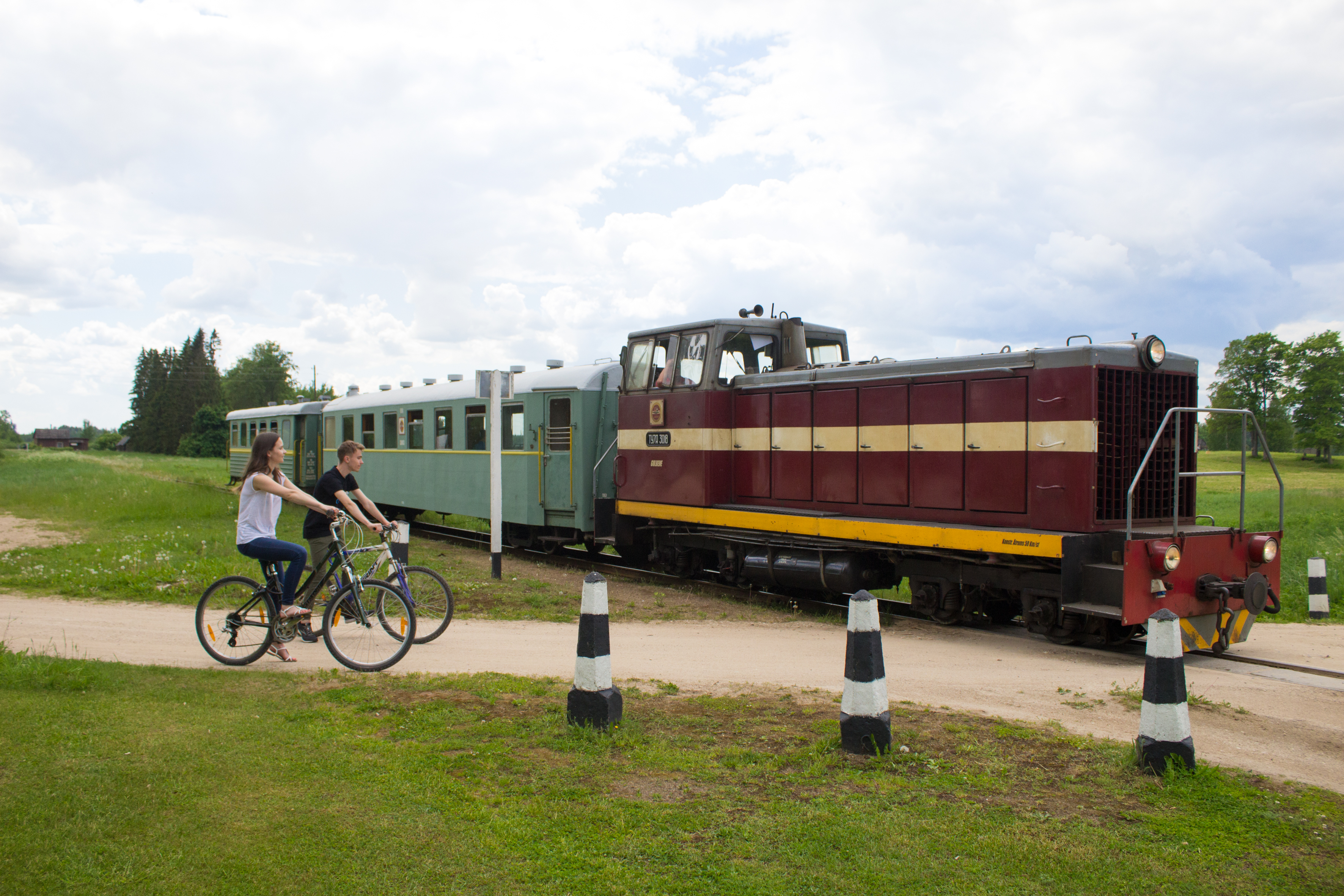
Train hauled by a TU7 diesel locomotive on the Gulbene–Alūksne railway

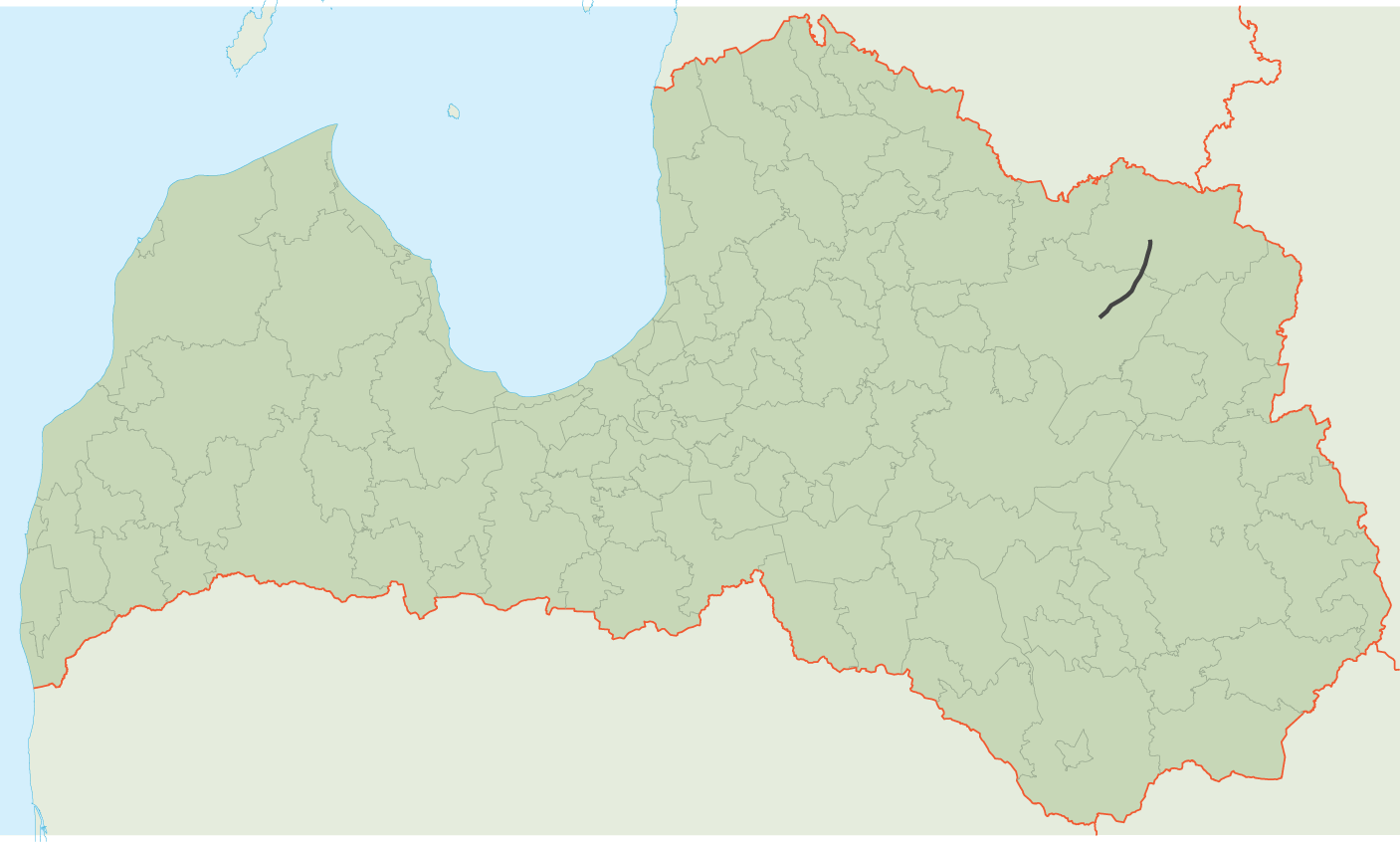
Map of the railway's route

The Gulbene–Alūksne railway line is a 750 mm-gauge railways that connects the cities of Gulbene and Alūksne in Latvia. It is 33 km (21 miles) long and is the only narrow-gauge railway line in the Baltic states with regular passenger services.

== History ==
The origins of the line can be traced back to 1903, when construction of the Pļaviņas–Valka railway line began. During the Russian Revolution of 1905, in December 1905, this railway line was temporarily taken under control by revolutionary fighters.

The section from Pļaviņas to Gulbene was converted into a broad-gauge railway line during World War I. The Gulbene–Valka line remained narrow gauge but was closed due to suffered damage during the war. Traffic was restored in March 1920 on the Gulbene–Alūksne section, and in 1921 on the section to Valka. World War II also brought losses and damage to the railway. After the war, traffic was restored from Gulbene to Ape in 1945, and in 1958 also to Valga. In 1970, the section from Ape to Valga was closed, and in 1973, the line was further truncated from Ape to Alūksne. In 1984, the remaining railway section was granted the status of a technical monument.

After Latvia became independent again in 1991 the ownership of the line passed to Latvijas dzelzceļš. Freight traffic ended in 1992 and in 2002 the line was taken over by the locally-owned SIA Gulbenes–Alūksnes bānītis. Until 2010, the line ran 3 pairs of trains per day, but from February 2010, the morning trip was cancelled.

== Current operations ==
As of 2025 there were two daily return services on the line, mostly comprising a TU7A locomotive and a single carriage. On certain dates the train is hauled by a steam locomotive named Ferdinands. Since 2000, a Bānītis festival has been organized in September to promote the train.

== Bānīša Land ==
Since 2019, the area crossed by the Gulbene–Alūksne railway has been marketed for tourism as Bānīša Land. Six waymarked cycling routes have been created which begin or end at one of the line's stations and allow a cycling trip to be combined with a trip on a narrow-gauge train, or Bānītis. The history and significance of the line for local residents can be learned in a multimedia exhibition at the Alūksne station. Special viewing points have been set up for watching the train in Stāmeriena and on Pullānas Hill near Alūksne.

== Gallery ==
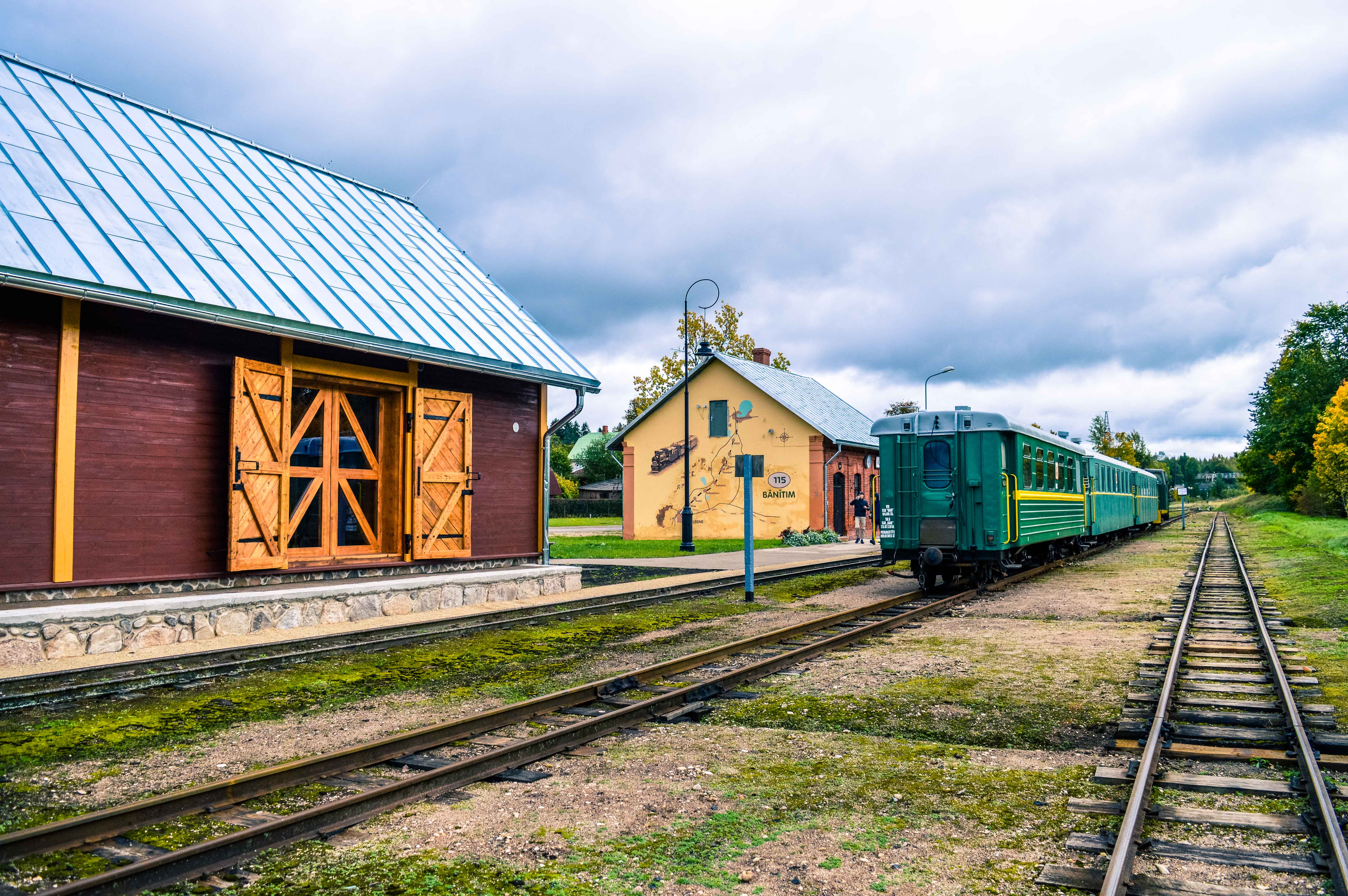
Train at Alūksne station

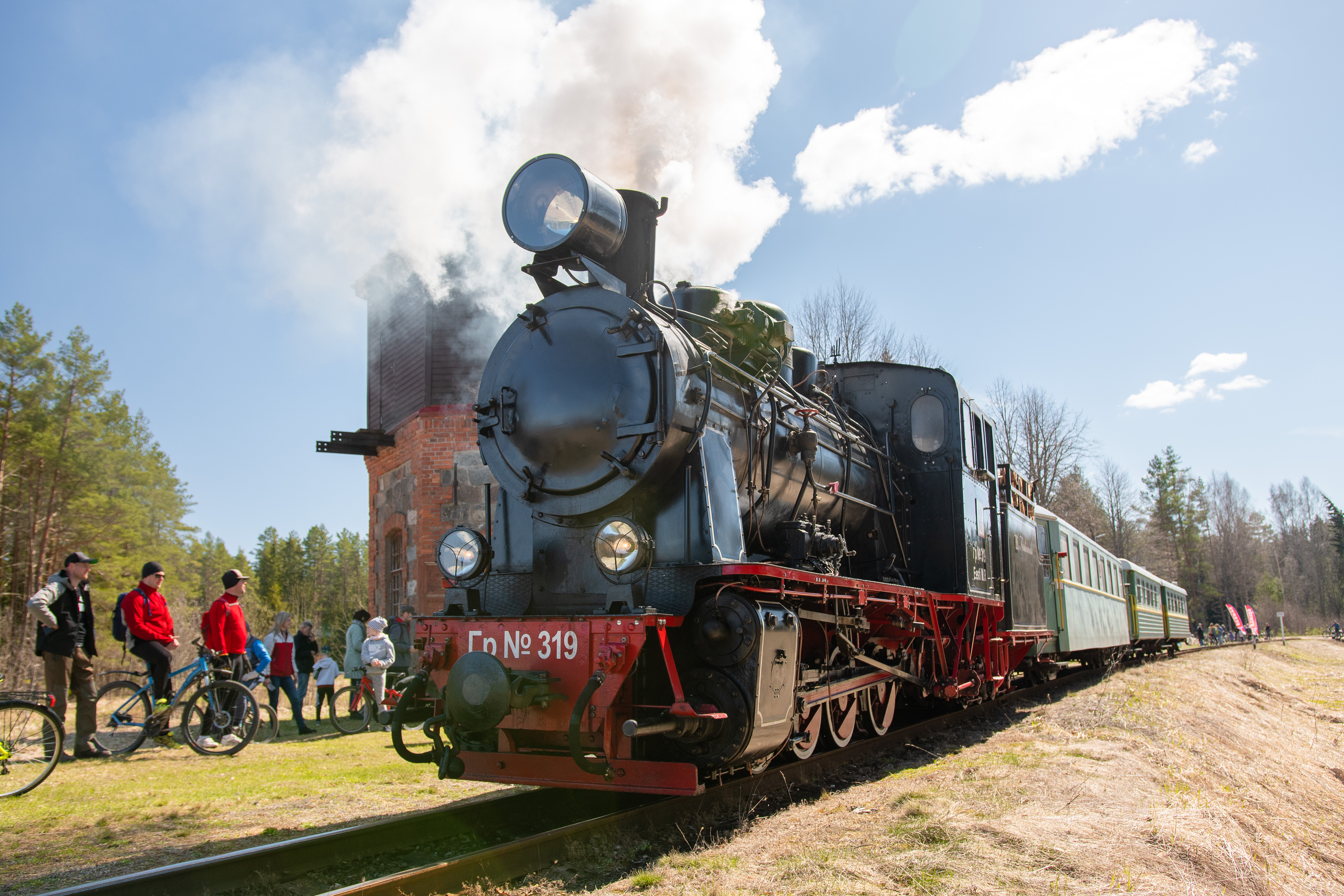
Steam locomotive Ferdinands at the water tower at Papardes station

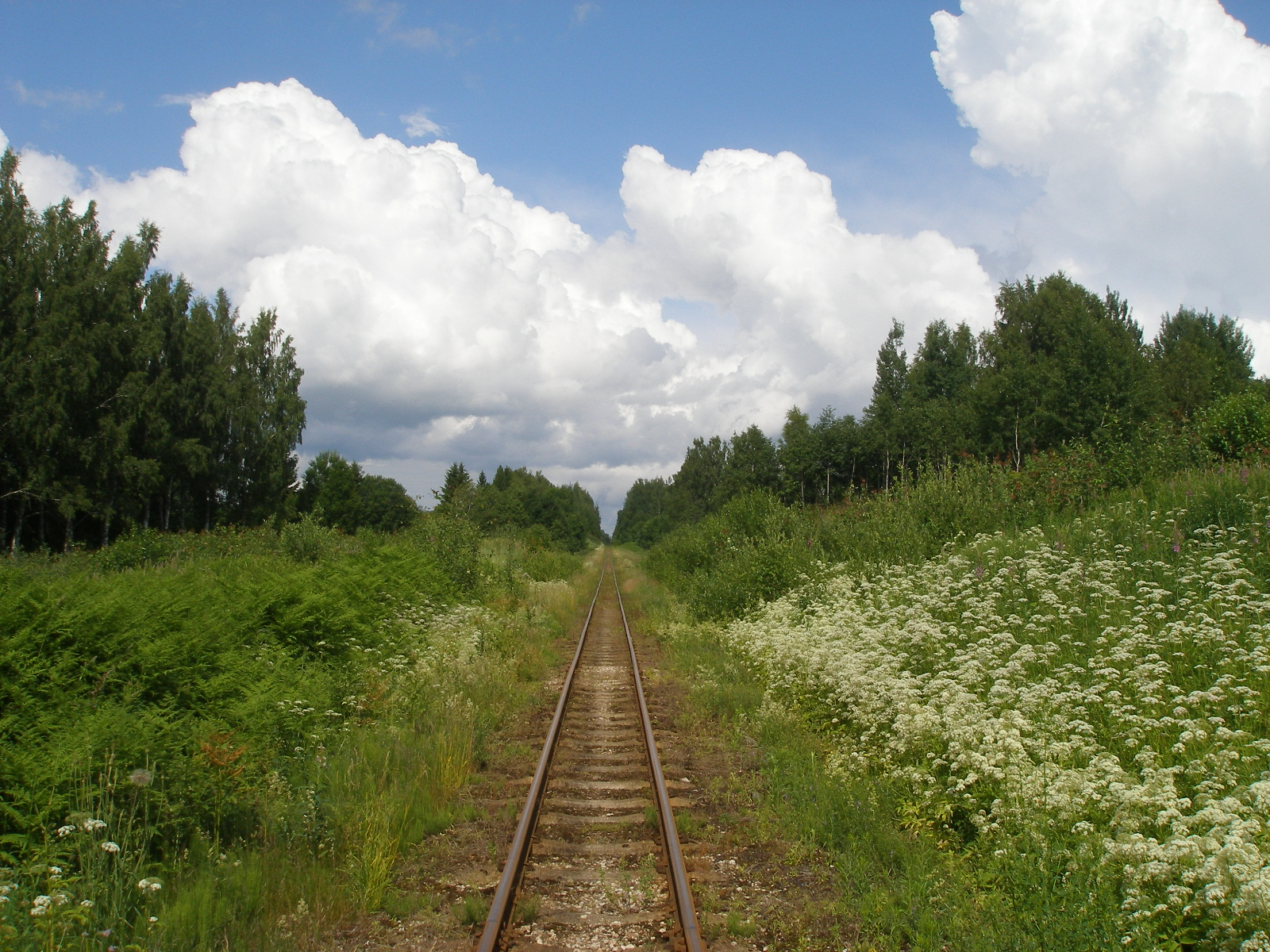
Kalniena—Dunduri section of the line

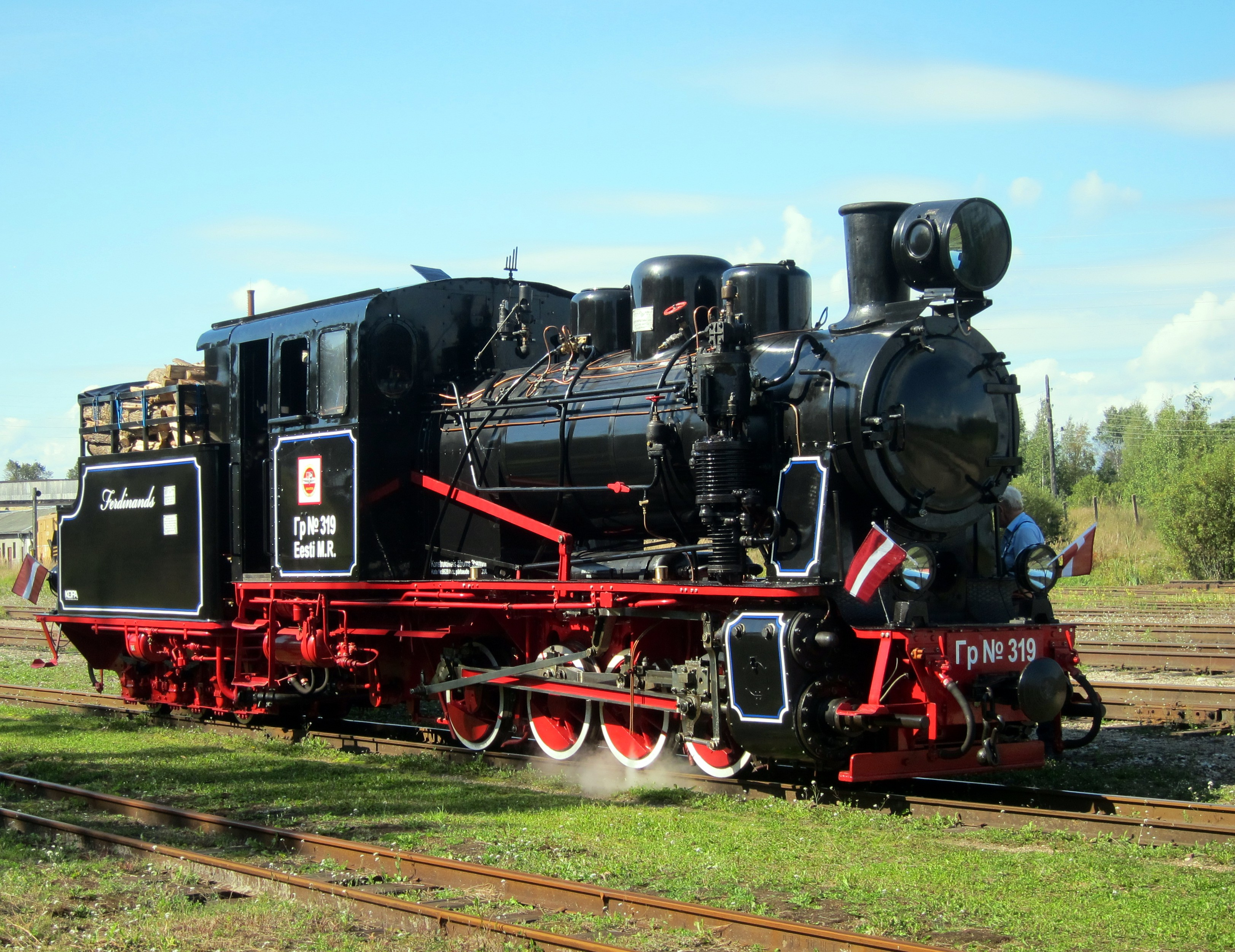
Restored steam locomotive Gr-319 Ferdinands

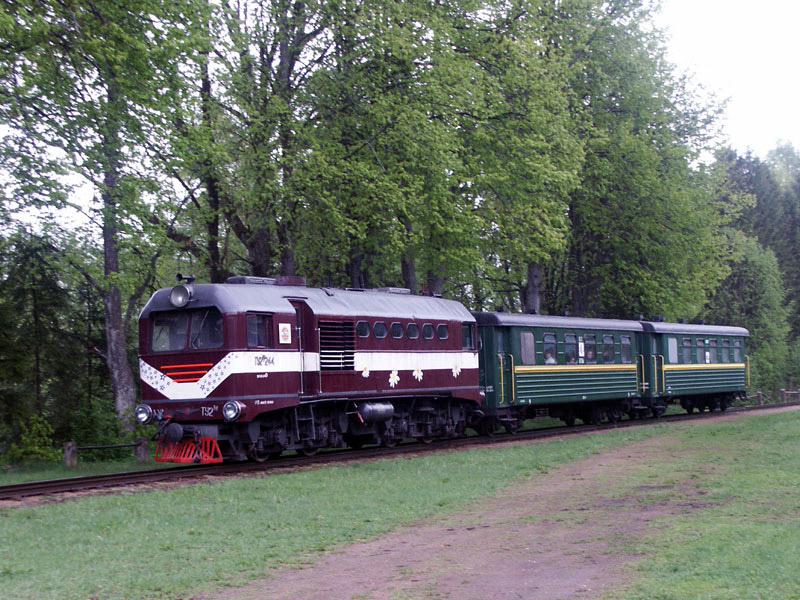
TU2 diesel locomotive on the line

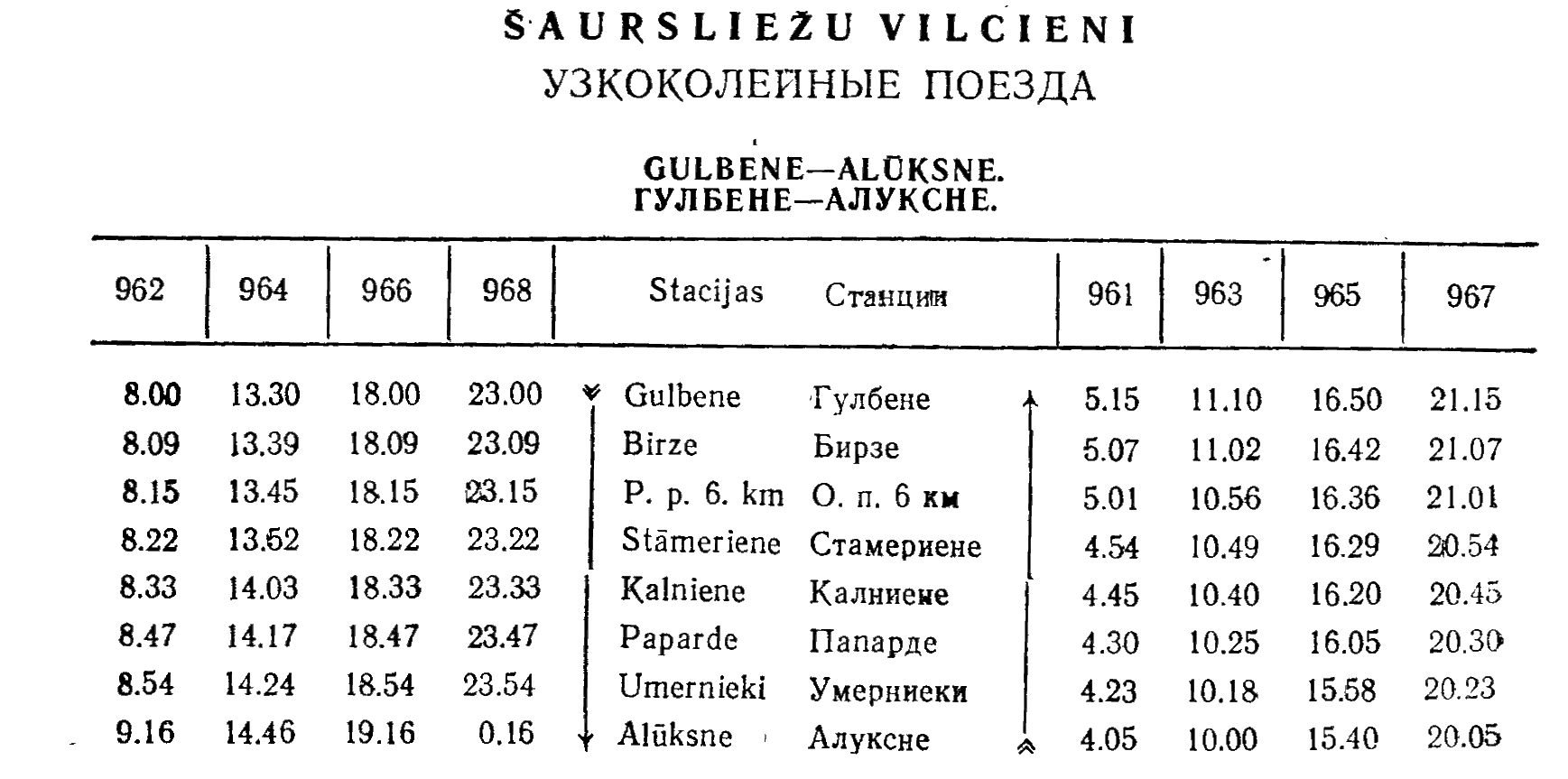
Timetable for the line in 1979

== See also ==
- Narrow-gauge railways in Latvia
- History of rail transport in Latvia
