= Asa Lanova =

- Born: Maryse Jaton; 17 March 1933
- Died: 26 December 2017 (aged 84)
- Years active: 1977-2011 (as writer)

Asa Lanova (born Maryse Jaton; 17 March 1933 – 26 December 2017) was a Swiss dancer and Suisse Romande author.

== Biography ==
Asa Lanova was born in Switzerland, spending her youth in Lausanne. At 17, she went to Paris to study dance, where she performed with dancers such as Maurice Béjart. She returned to Switzerland in 1956, performing at the Zürich Opera House and the Grand Théâtre de Genève.

After leaving her dance career, Lanova began to write novels, publishing her first, La dernière migration, in 1977. After switching to a different publisher, Bernard Campiche, Lanova received recognition for her work, winning prizes for both Le Blues d'Alexandrie and La Gazelle tartare.

In 1965, she married fellow dancer Philippe Dahlmann. Lanova died at her home in Pully on 26 December 2017.

== Literary prizes ==
- 2009 - Prix culturel vaudois Littérature for her literary work.
- 2005 - 5,000 SFr Schiller Prize for La Gazelle tartare.
- 1999 - Prix Bibliothèque pour Tous (BPT) (now Prix Bibliomedia Suisse) for Le Blues d'Alexandrie.

== Publications ==
- La dernière migration, Paris, Régine Deforges, 1977
- Crève l'amour, Paris, éditions Acropole, 1984; Orbe, Bernard Campiche éditeur, coll. « CamPoche», 2006
- Le cœur tatoué, Paris, éditions Mazarine, 1988
- L'étalon de ténèbre, Paris, Régine Deforges, 1991; Vevey, Éditions de l'Aire, 1999
- Le testament d'une mante religieuse, Vevey, éditions de l'Aire, 1995
- Le blues d'Alexandrie Orbe, Bernard Campiche éditeur, 1998
- Les jardins de Shalalatt Orbe, Bernard Campiche éditeur, 2001
- La Gazelle tartare, Orbe, Bernard Campiche éditeur, 2004
- La nuit du destin, Orbe, Bernard Campiche éditeur, 2007
- Les heures nues, Orbe, Bernard Campiche éditeur, 2011 ISBN 978-2-88241-286-7
