= Alūksne =

Town and capital of Alūksne Municipality, Latvia

- Town
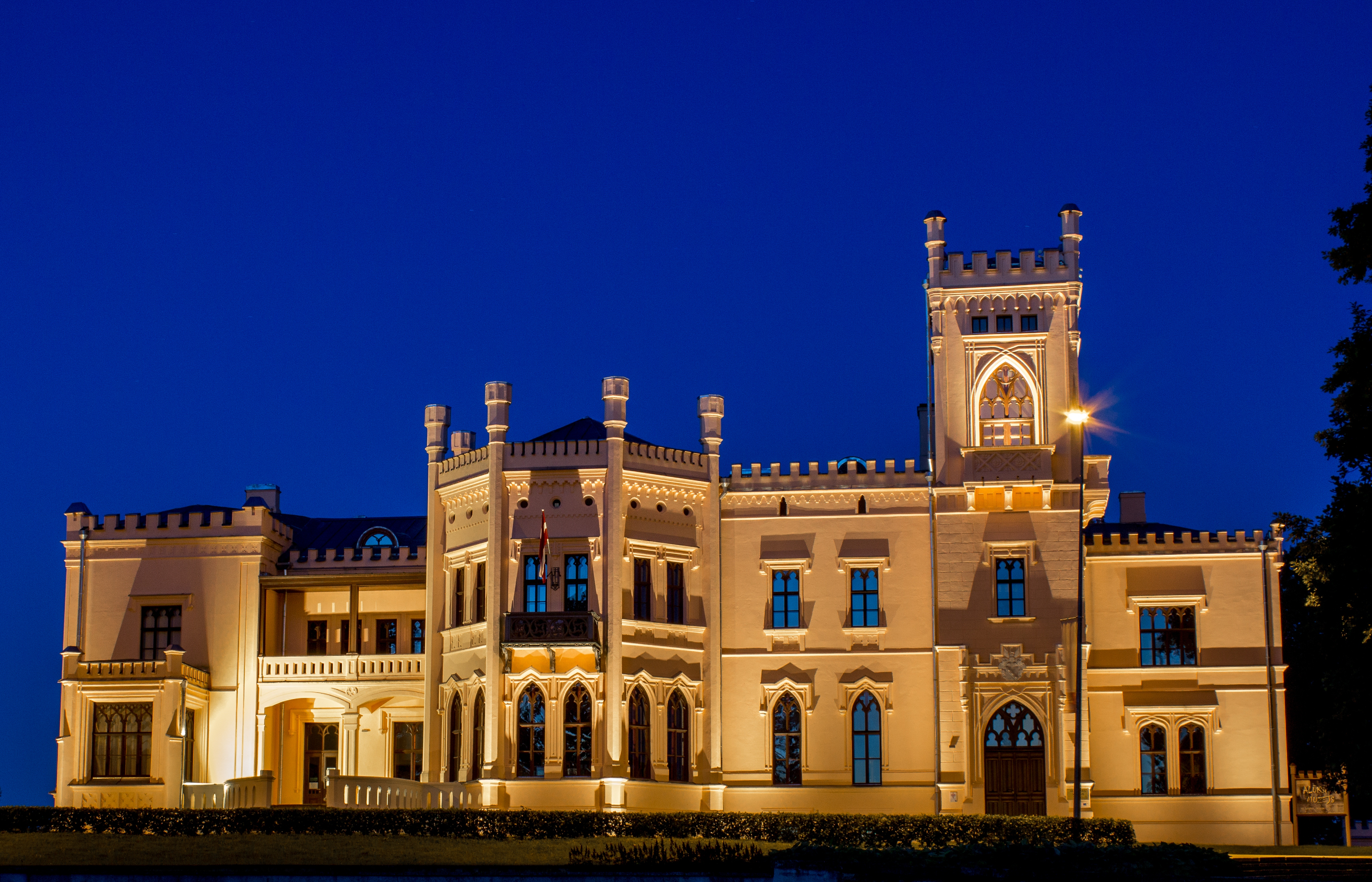
- The New Castle of Alūksne

- Flag Coat of arms

- Location in Latvia
- Coordinates: 57°25′26″N 27°03′01″E
- Country: Latvia
- District: Alūksne Municipality
- Town rights: 1920

Government
  - Mayor: Dzintars Adlers

Area
  - Total: 14.27 km^{2} (5.51 sq mi)
  - Land: 10.58 km^{2} (4.08 sq mi)
  - Water: 3.69 km^{2} (1.42 sq mi)
- Elevation: 217 m (712 ft)

Population (2026)
  - Total: 6,104
  - Density: 576.9/km^{2} (1,494/sq mi)
- Time zone: UTC+2 (EET)
  - Summer (DST): UTC+3 (EEST)
- Postal code: LV-430(1-2)
- Calling code: +371 643
- Climate: Dfb
- Website: visitaluksne.lv/eng/

Alūksne (German: Marienburg, Russian: Олыста [Olysta]) is a town on the shores of Lake Alūksne in the Vidzeme region of Latvia near the borders with Estonia and Russia. It is the seat of the Alūksne municipality. Alūksne is the highest city in Latvia, being located in the East Vidzeme Upland at 217 m above sea level.

== History ==
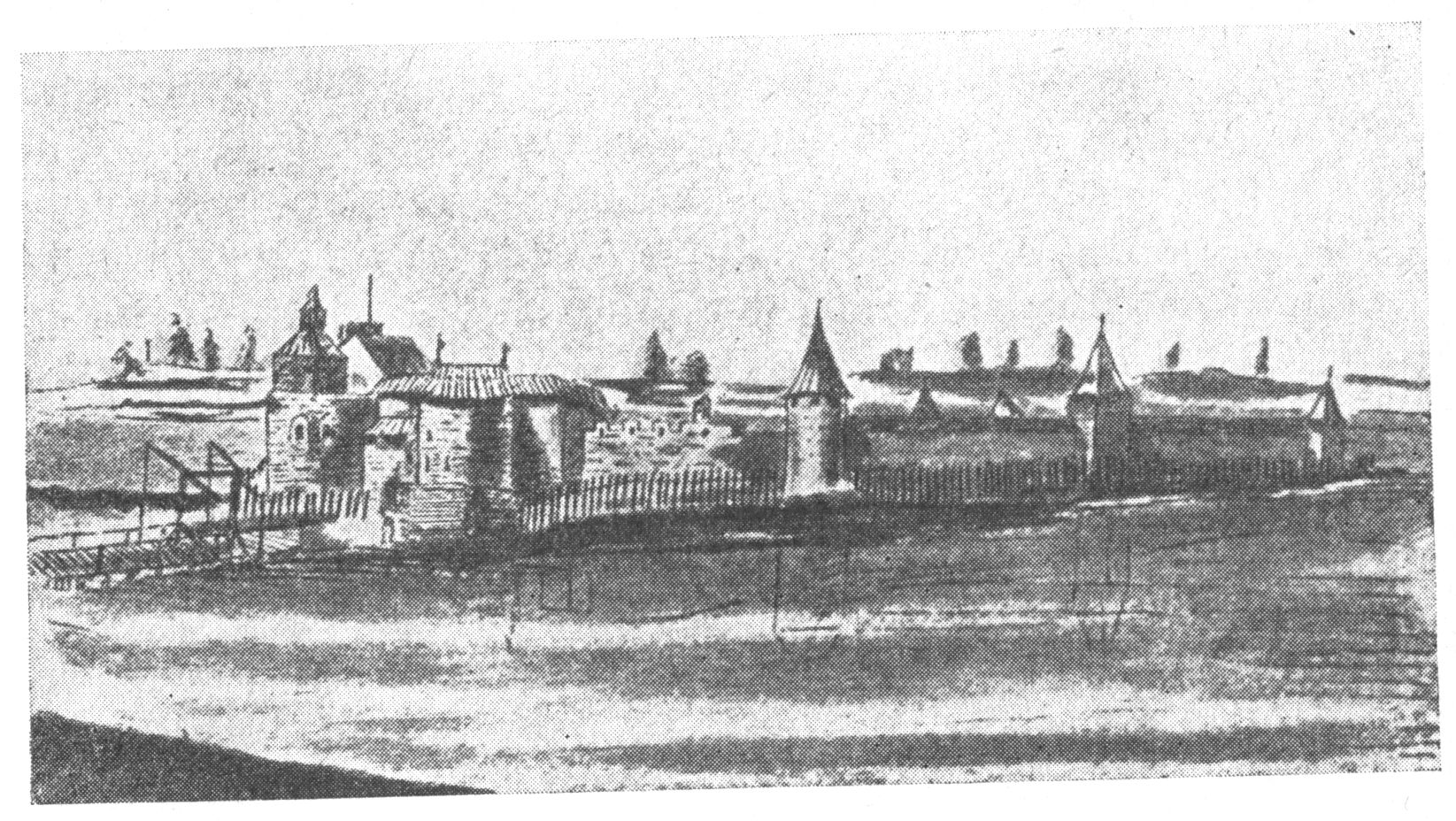
Alūksne Castle in 1661

The region around lake Alūksne has been continually inhabited since around the turn of the first millennium CE, although stray finds of flint and stone tools dating back to the late Neolithic and the Bronze age have been found in the vicinity of the lake. The area is mentioned by the Pskov Chronicles in the 13th century and the Latgalian hillfort on the Tempļakalns hill is thought to have been created around this time. The region is believed to have been part of the Latgalian state of Atzele (Adselen).

In the 13th century, parts of the territory of Atzele were taken over by the Livonian Brothers of the Sword in accordance with a 1224 agreement with the Archbishop of Riga. After the destruction of the order in 1237, its properties were acquired by the Teutonic Order. In 1342, the Teutonic order started building a castle on the largest island of the lake which became the centre of the former Gaujiena commandery. The first Commander of the castle was Arnold Vitinghove, a distant ancestor to the later barons of the area, the Vietinghoff family. As the foundations of the castle were laid on the Feast of the Annunciation, it and the castle town were named Marienburg, which remained the official name of the town until the Independence of Latvia.

Alūksne was captured by the troops of Ivan IV of Russia in 1560 during the Livonian War. It was incorporated into the Polish–Lithuanian Commonwealth in 1582 and became property of Olbracht Łaski. The town changed hands several times during the Polish-Swedish wars until it became part of the Swedish Empire in 1629.

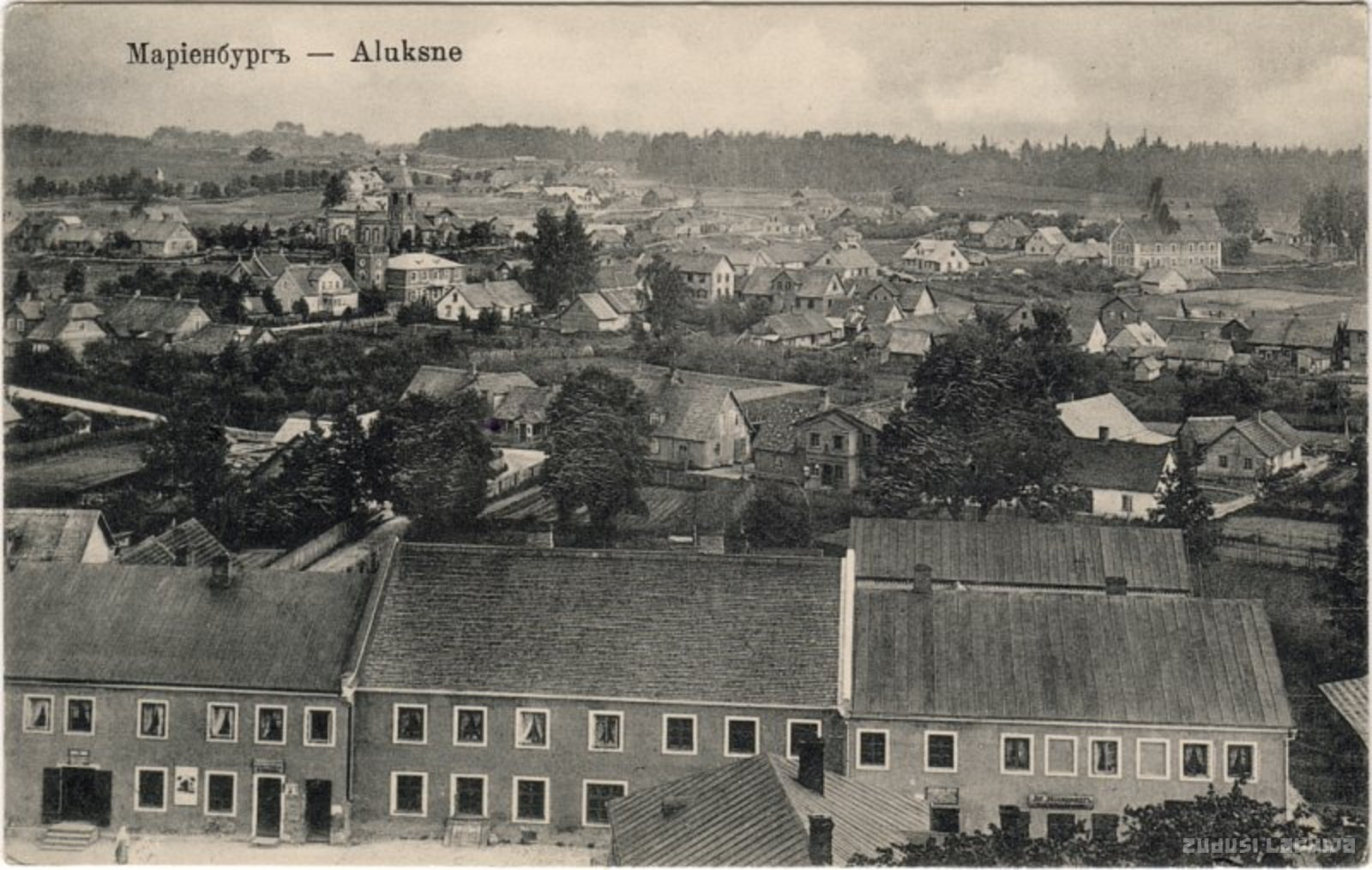
Alūksne city centre before the destruction by fire in 1940

Ernst Glück, a Lutheran clergyman and the first translator of the Bible into Latvian, lived in Alūksne when he founded the first Latvian language schools in Vidzeme in 1683. When the Russian army under Boris Sheremetyev conquered the town in 1702, Glück was given a chance to move to Russia and work under Tsar Peter the Great. His servant or adoptive daughter, Martha Skavronska (sometimes rendered as Skowronska or Skawronska) became acquainted with Prince Alexander Menshikov who introduced her to the Tsar, the same woman is believed to later have become Empress Catherine I.

In the mid-18th century the estate was bought by the Baltic German noble and Privy Councillor Otto Hermann von Vietinghoff as a summer retreat. In the 1780s, he commissioned Christoph Haberland, one of the foremost neoclassical architects of the Baltics, to build the Alūksne Lutheran church. Otto Vietinghoff's son, naturalist Burchard Christoph von Vietinghoff, created a large landscape park in the area, part of which was also used as a botanical garden. The Tudor Revival style New Palace was built for Alexander Joseph von Vietinghoff between 1859 and the early 1860s.

In the early 20th century, the Valka-Pļaviņas narrow-gauge railway line was built and later closed. The Gulbene-Alūksne segment of the line was later reestablished as a tourist destination and for regular passenger transport.

During the Latvian War of Independence, Alūksne was one of the first major settlements in Vidzeme which was liberated by the Latvian Army in May 1919. In 1920, Alūksne was granted its town charter. In early 1921, it became the base operations for the 7th Sigulda Infantry Regiment that stayed in the town until being dissolved after the 1940 Soviet occupation of the Baltics. During World War II, Alūksne was under German occupation from 5 July 1941 until 19 August 1944. Up to 300 Jews from the Alūksne region were murdered by the Arājs Kommando with the help of other Nazi collaborators near the village of Siseņi.

Since 2009, Alūksne has been an administrative center of the Alūksne Municipality. The town houses two museums, a tourism centre and several religious communities. Alūksne is considered one of the main centers in Latvia for the sport of biathlon, with several known biathletes hailing from or having undergone their training in the area.

=== Lake Alūksne ===
Alūksne is located next to Lake Alūksne, the eleventh largest lake in Latvia. There are four islands in the lake - Cepurītes, Garā, Tīklu, and Pilssala (Castle Island). The average depth of the lake is about 7 meters, while the deepest place reaches up to around 20 meters.

== Climate ==
Alūksne has a humid continental climate (Köppen Dfb).

Climate data for Alūksne, Latvia (1991-2020 normals, extremes 1945-present)
Month	Jan	Feb	Mar	Apr	May	Jun	Jul	Aug	Sep	Oct	Nov	Dec	Year
Record high °C (°F)	8.8 (47.8)	10.9 (51.6)	18.2 (64.8)	26.5 (79.7)	30.2 (86.4)	32.0 (89.6)	33.3 (91.9)	32.9 (91.2)	29.4 (84.9)	21.1 (70.0)	13.1 (55.6)	10.8 (51.4)	33.3 (91.9)
Mean daily maximum °C (°F)	−2.8 (27.0)	−2.4 (27.7)	2.5 (36.5)	10.2 (50.4)	16.4 (61.5)	19.9 (67.8)	22.4 (72.3)	20.9 (69.6)	15.3 (59.5)	8.2 (46.8)	2.3 (36.1)	−1.1 (30.0)	9.3 (48.8)
Daily mean °C (°F)	−4.9 (23.2)	−5.1 (22.8)	−1.0 (30.2)	5.6 (42.1)	11.3 (52.3)	15.0 (59.0)	17.4 (63.3)	16.1 (61.0)	11.1 (52.0)	5.3 (41.5)	−0.4 (31.3)	−3.0 (26.6)	5.7 (42.3)
Mean daily minimum °C (°F)	−7.5 (18.5)	−8.1 (17.4)	−4.6 (23.7)	0.8 (33.4)	5.7 (42.3)	9.9 (49.8)	12.6 (54.7)	11.6 (52.9)	7.4 (45.3)	2.6 (36.7)	−1.6 (29.1)	−5.1 (22.8)	2.0 (35.6)
Record low °C (°F)	−37.4 (−35.3)	−36.8 (−34.2)	−28.8 (−19.8)	−15.9 (3.4)	−5.8 (21.6)	−0.3 (31.5)	2.9 (37.2)	0.7 (33.3)	−5.1 (22.8)	−10.6 (12.9)	−20.6 (−5.1)	−36.8 (−34.2)	−37.4 (−35.3)
Average precipitation mm (inches)	55.4 (2.18)	43.9 (1.73)	40.8 (1.61)	40.5 (1.59)	63.1 (2.48)	90.3 (3.56)	82.9 (3.26)	82.9 (3.26)	63.7 (2.51)	73.8 (2.91)	61.0 (2.40)	52.0 (2.05)	750.3 (29.54)
Average precipitation days (≥ 1 mm)	14	11	10	9	9	12	11	11	10	13	12	13	135
Average relative humidity (%)	91.0	88.0	77.9	69.4	67.4	72.9	75.7	79.0	83.7	87.9	91.6	92.2	81.4
Mean monthly sunshine hours	39	68	154	224	297	288	295	268	192	110	39	25	1,999
Percentage possible sunshine	14	24	37	47	55	52	54	53	41	24	12	10	41
Source 1: LVĢMC
Source 2: NOAA (precipitation days, humidity 1991-2020)

== Demographics ==
Within existing limits, according to CSB data.

Historical population

Year	Pop.	±%
1920	2,029	—
1925	3,507	+72.8%
1935	4,385	+25.0%
1959	6,400	+46.0%
1970	7,655	+19.6%

Year	Pop.	±%
1979	10,093	+31.8%
1989	10,913	+8.1%
2000	9,510	−12.9%
2011	8,057	−15.3%
2021	6,488	−19.5%

Source: Latvian Geospatial Information Agency

== Notable people ==
- Rozālija Purgale (1904-1984), the first female judge in Latvia.

=== Sport ===
- Dainis Dukurs (born 1957), retired bobsledder and skeleton coach
- Kristaps Lībietis (born 1982), biathlete, competed in the 2006 and 2010 Winter Olympics
- Ilona Marhele (born 1986), long distance runner, competed in the 2016 Summer Olympics
- Andrejs Rastorgujevs (born 1988), biathlete, has participated in three Winter Olympic Games
- Andris Vosekalns (born 1992), cyclist, has participated in three Winter Olympic Games
- Mairis Kļava (born 1999), bobsledder, he took part in the 2026 Winter Olympics

== Sister cities ==
- Joniškis, Lithuania

== Railway services ==
Services at Alūksne Station
- Current services
  Preceding station	LDz	Following station
  Vējiņi towards Gulbene	Gulbene–Alūksne	Terminus

== Gallery ==
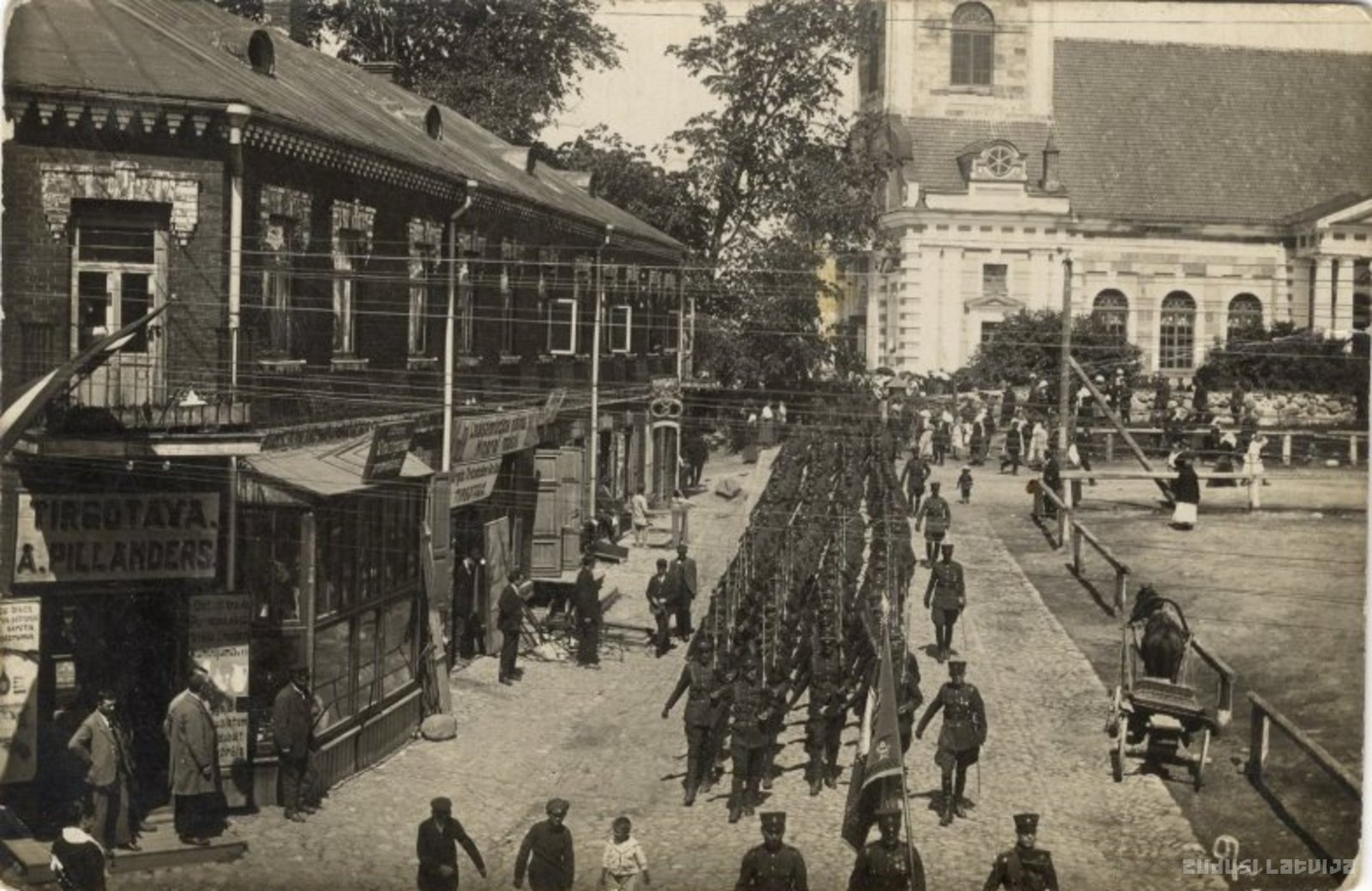
Soldiers of the Latvian National Armed Forces in Alūksne in the 1930s

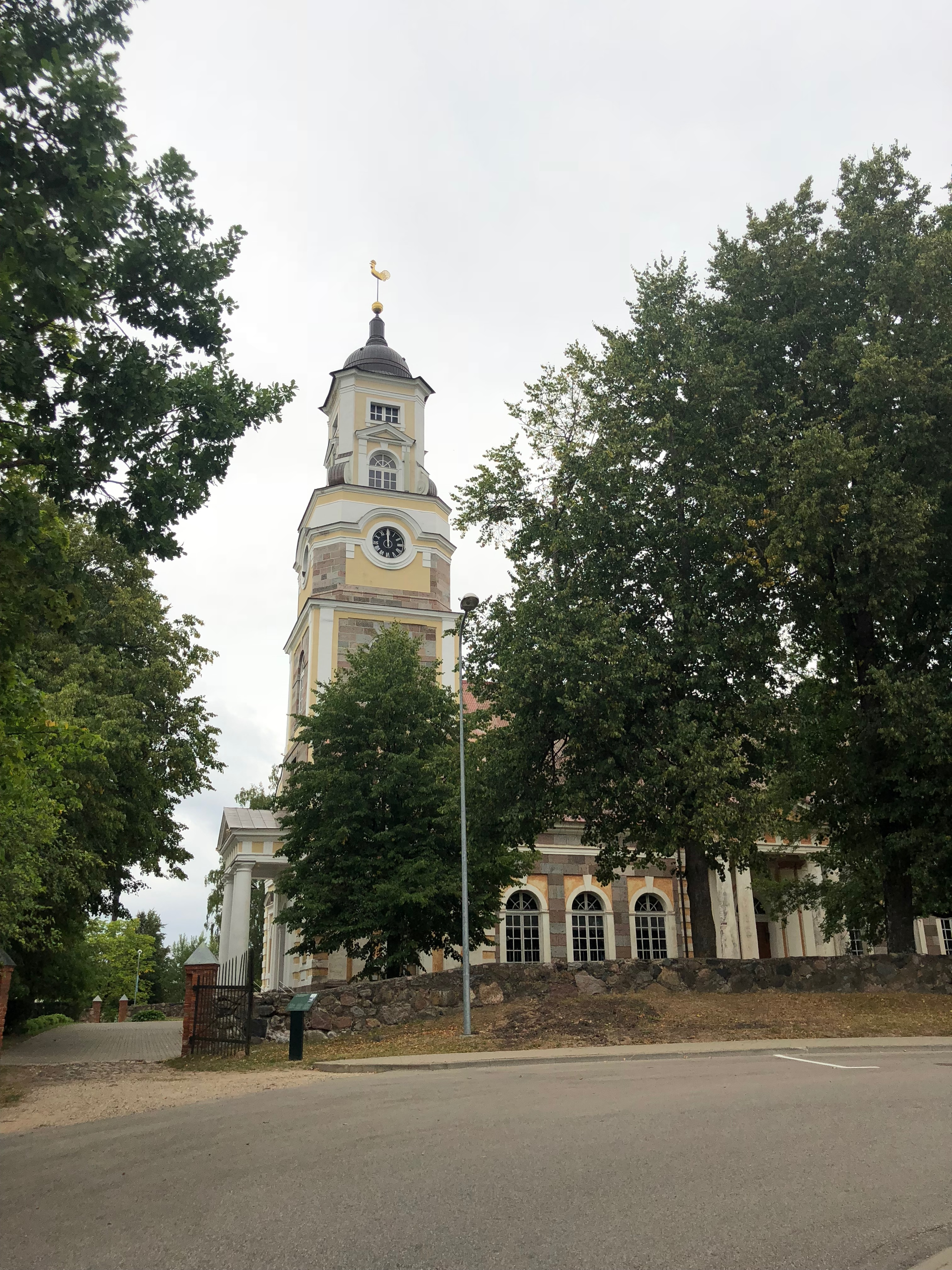
Lutheran church in Alūksne

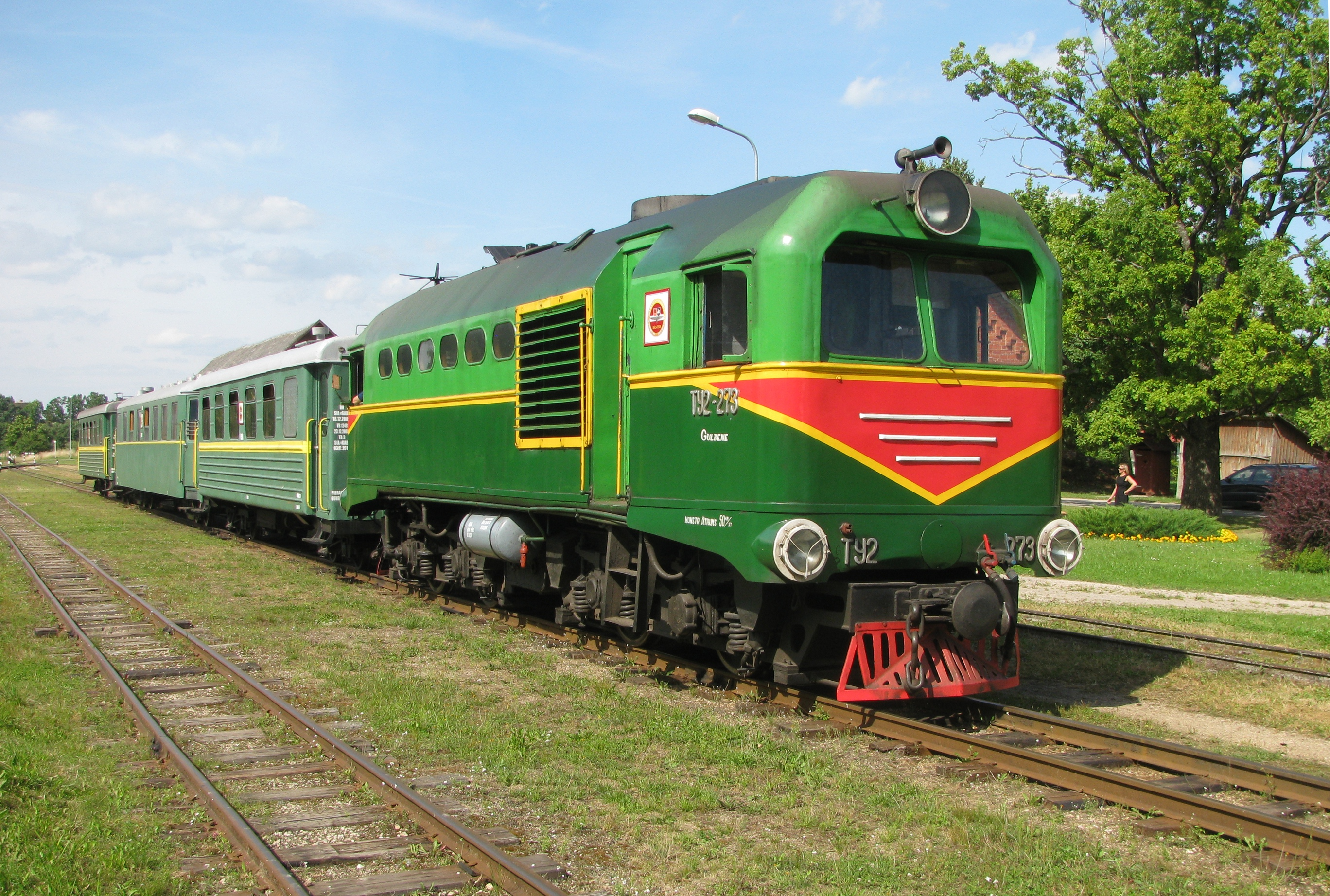
Narrow gauge railway in Alūksne

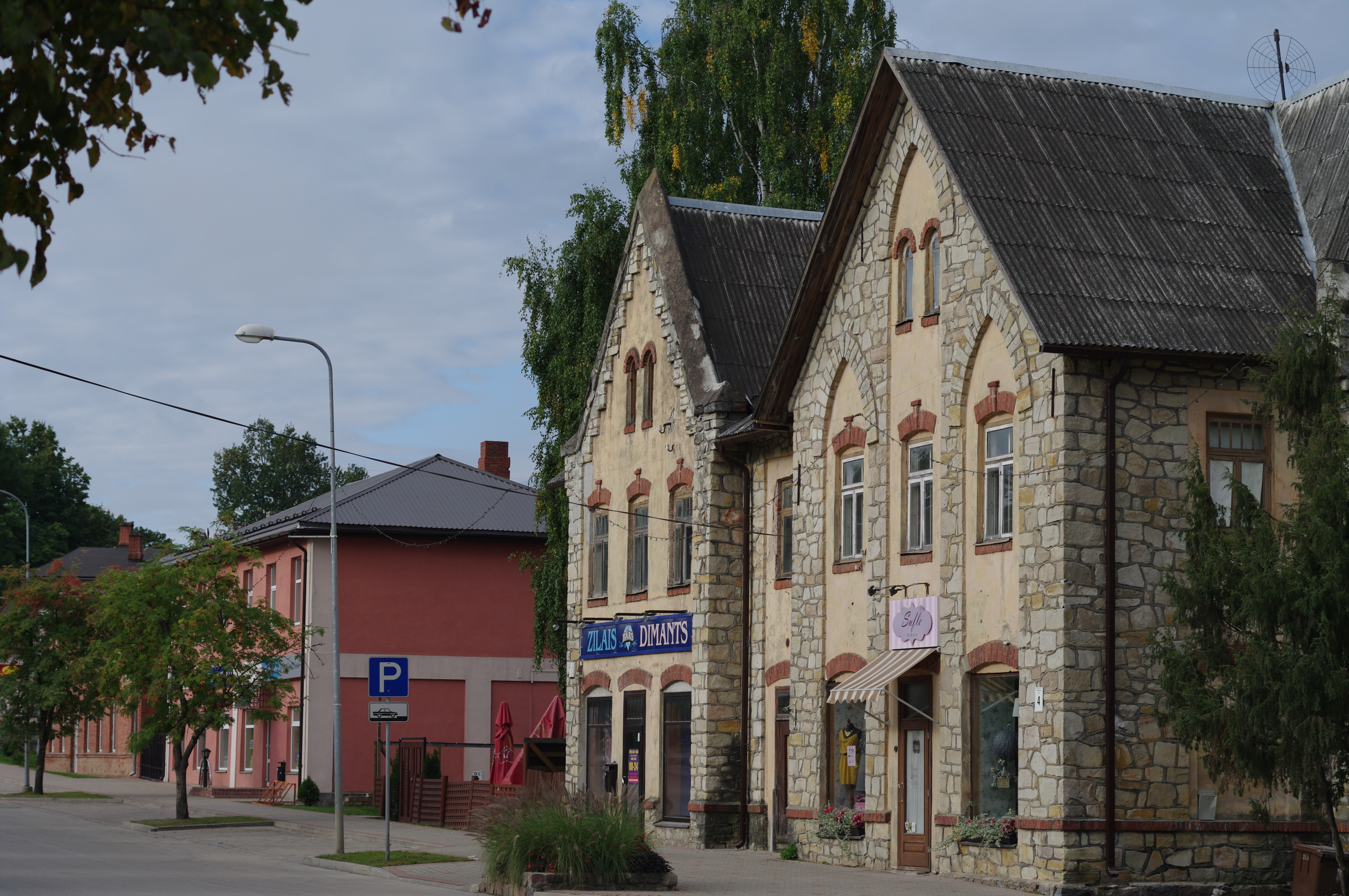
Alūksne town centre

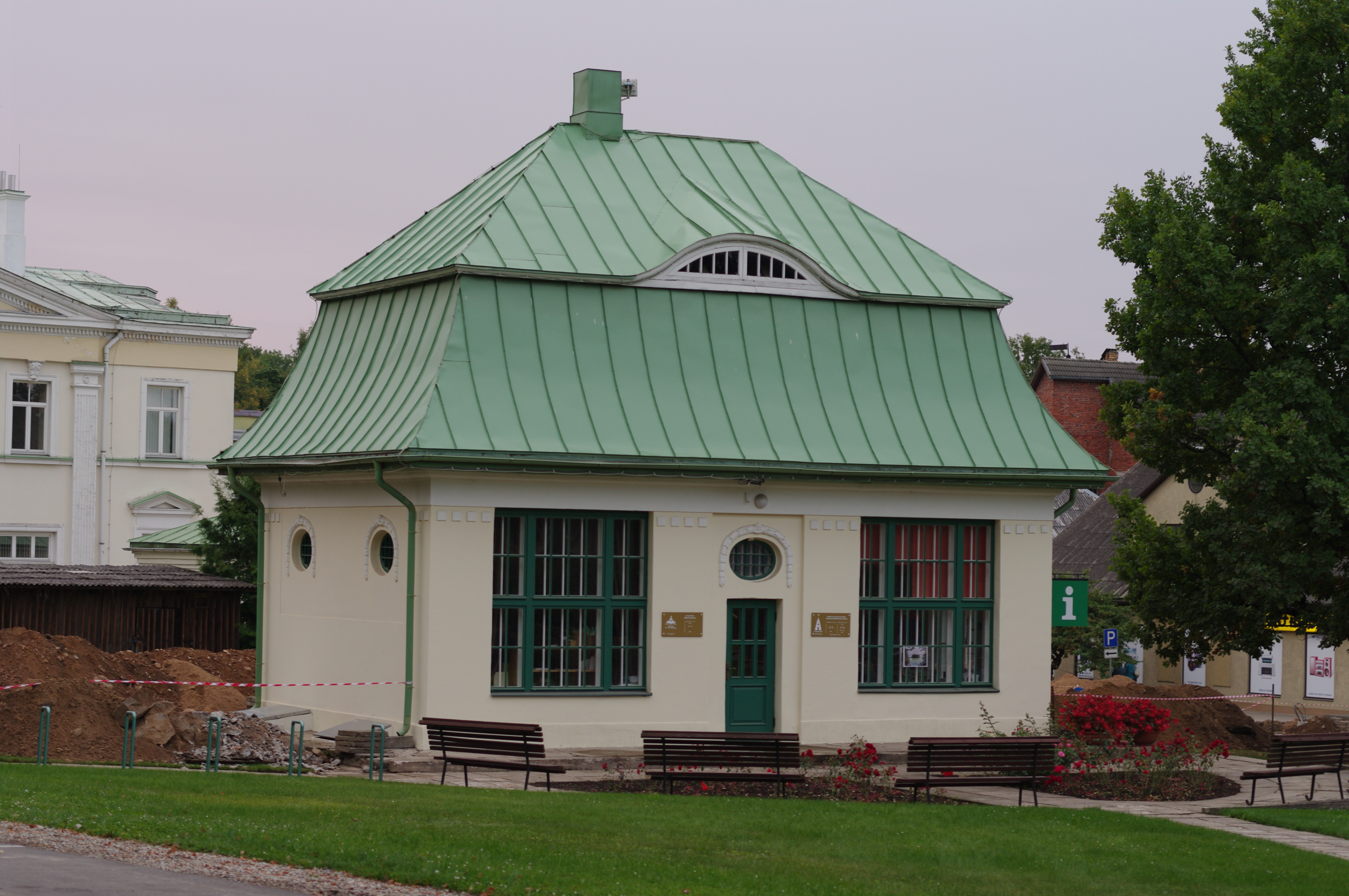
Ernst Glück Bible Museum

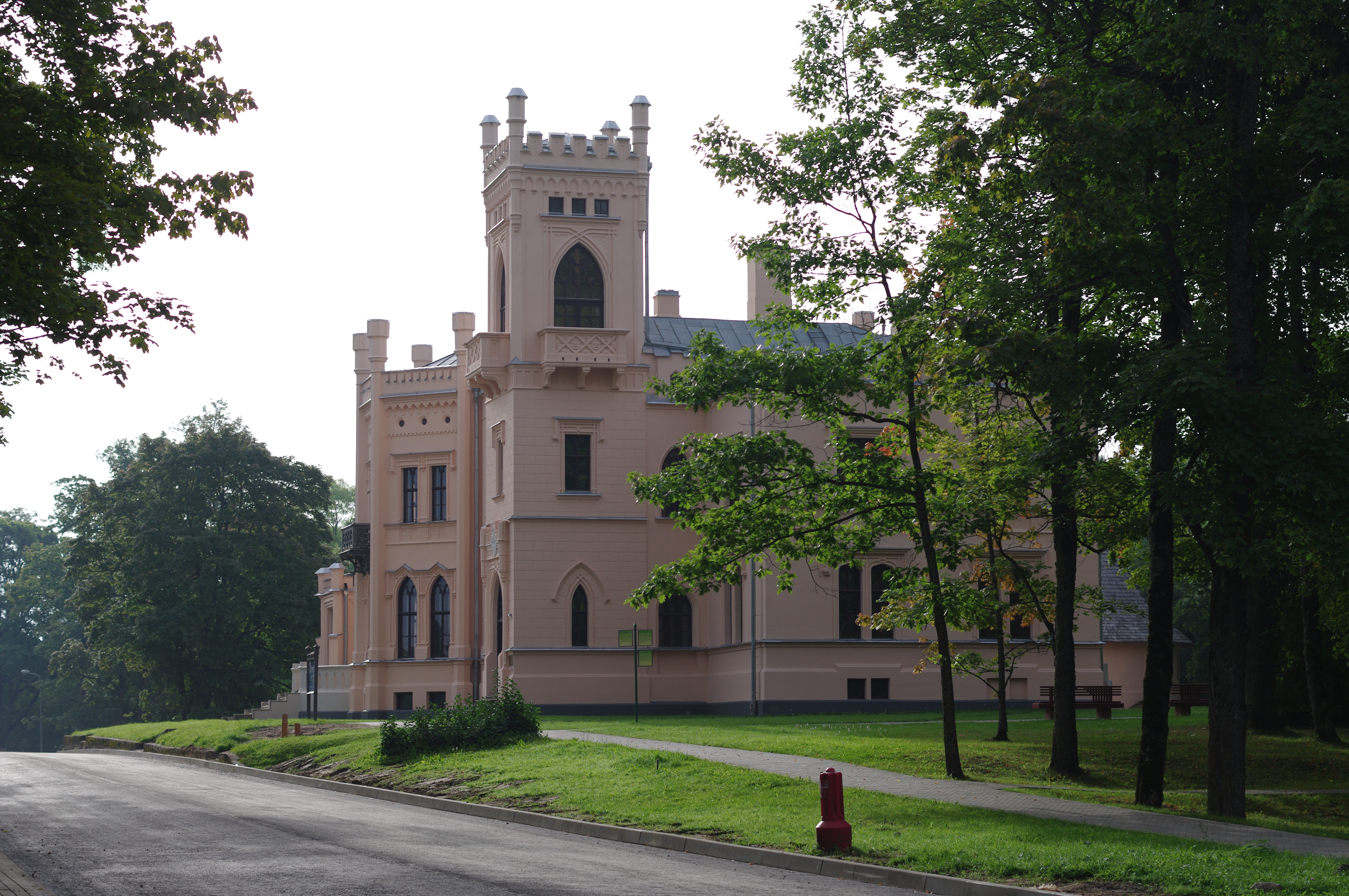
Alūksne New Castle

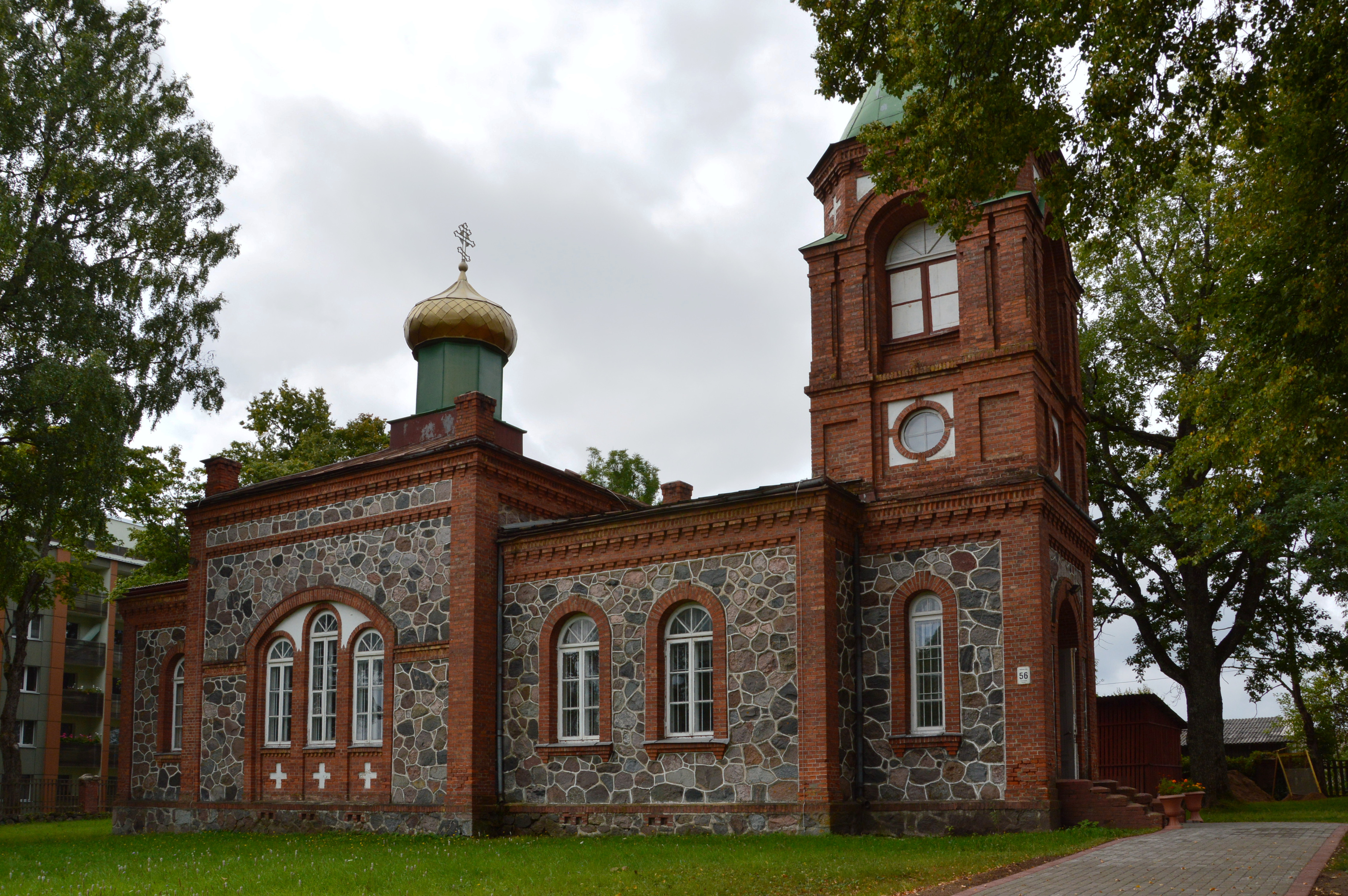
Alūksne orthodox church

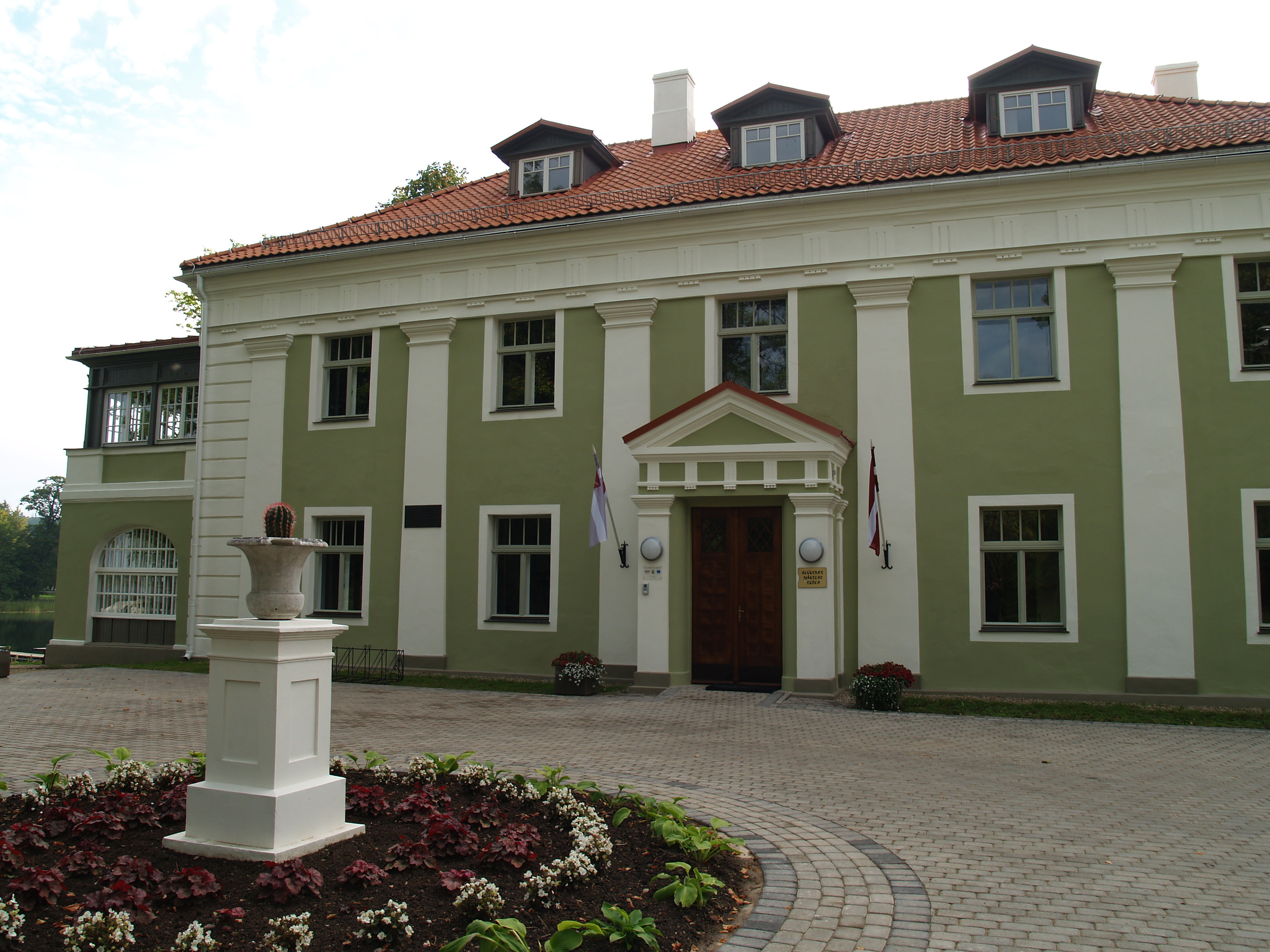
Alūksne Art School

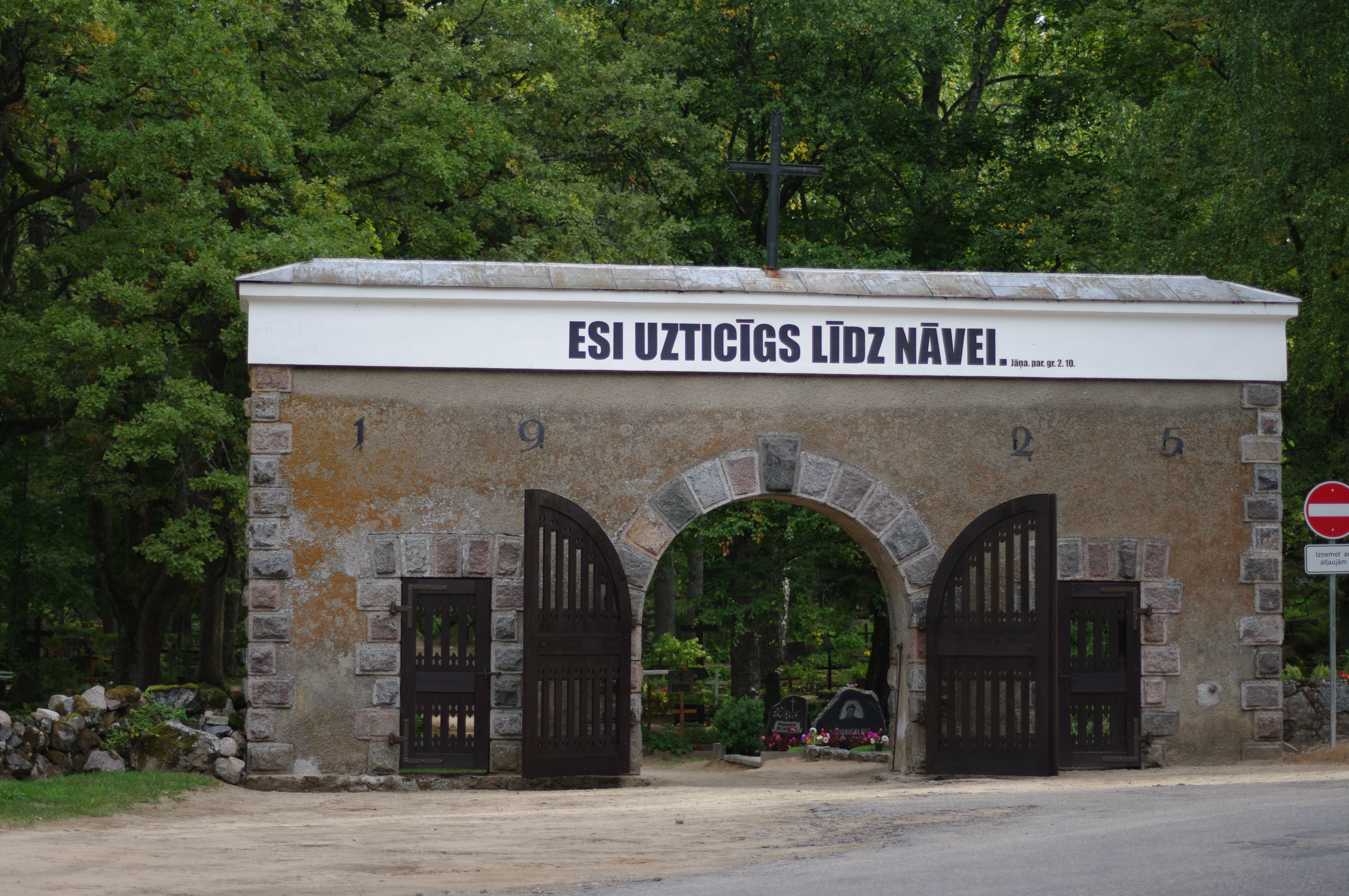
Alūksne cemetery

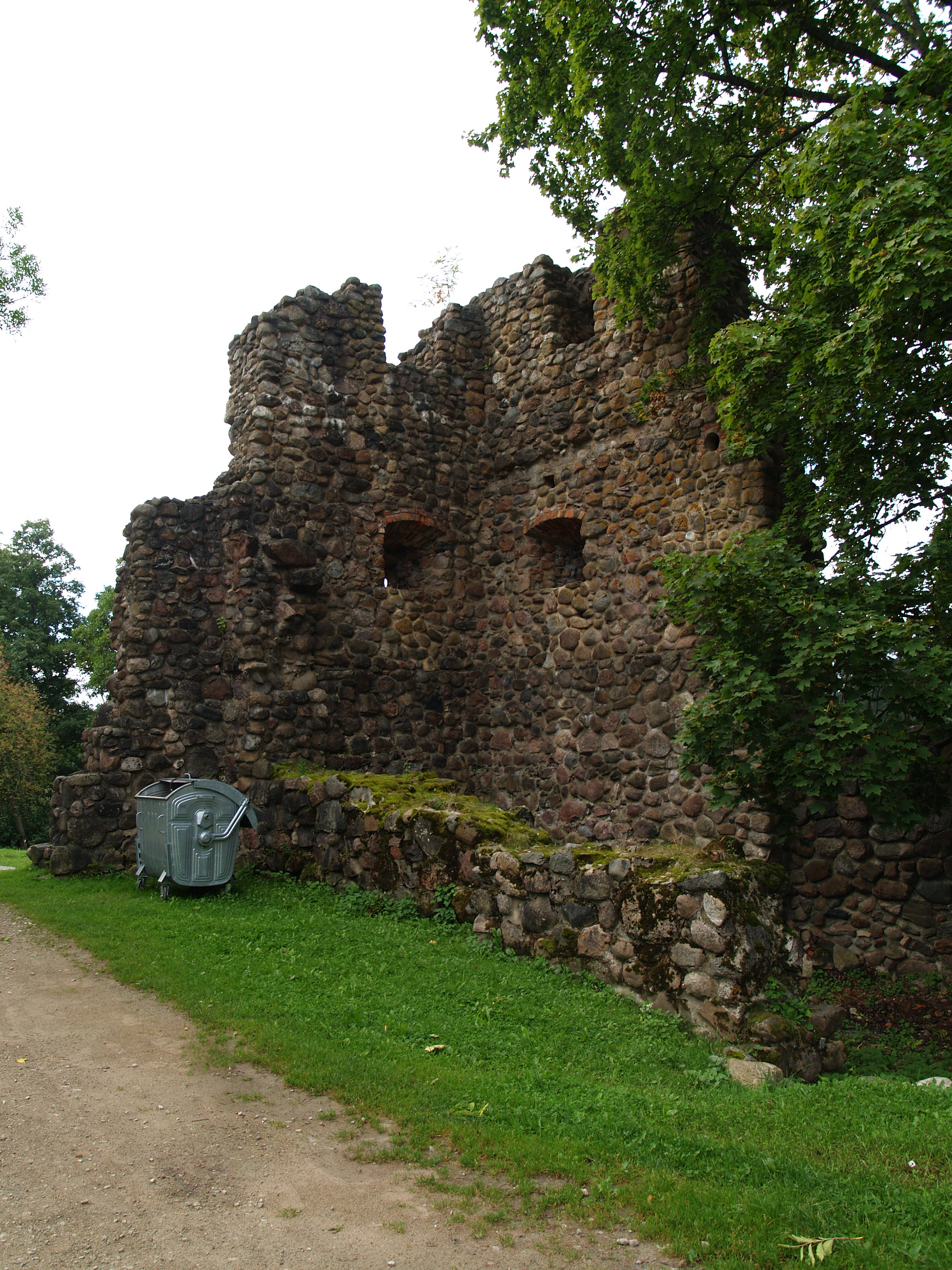
Alūksne Castle ruins
