= Pully =

- Municipality
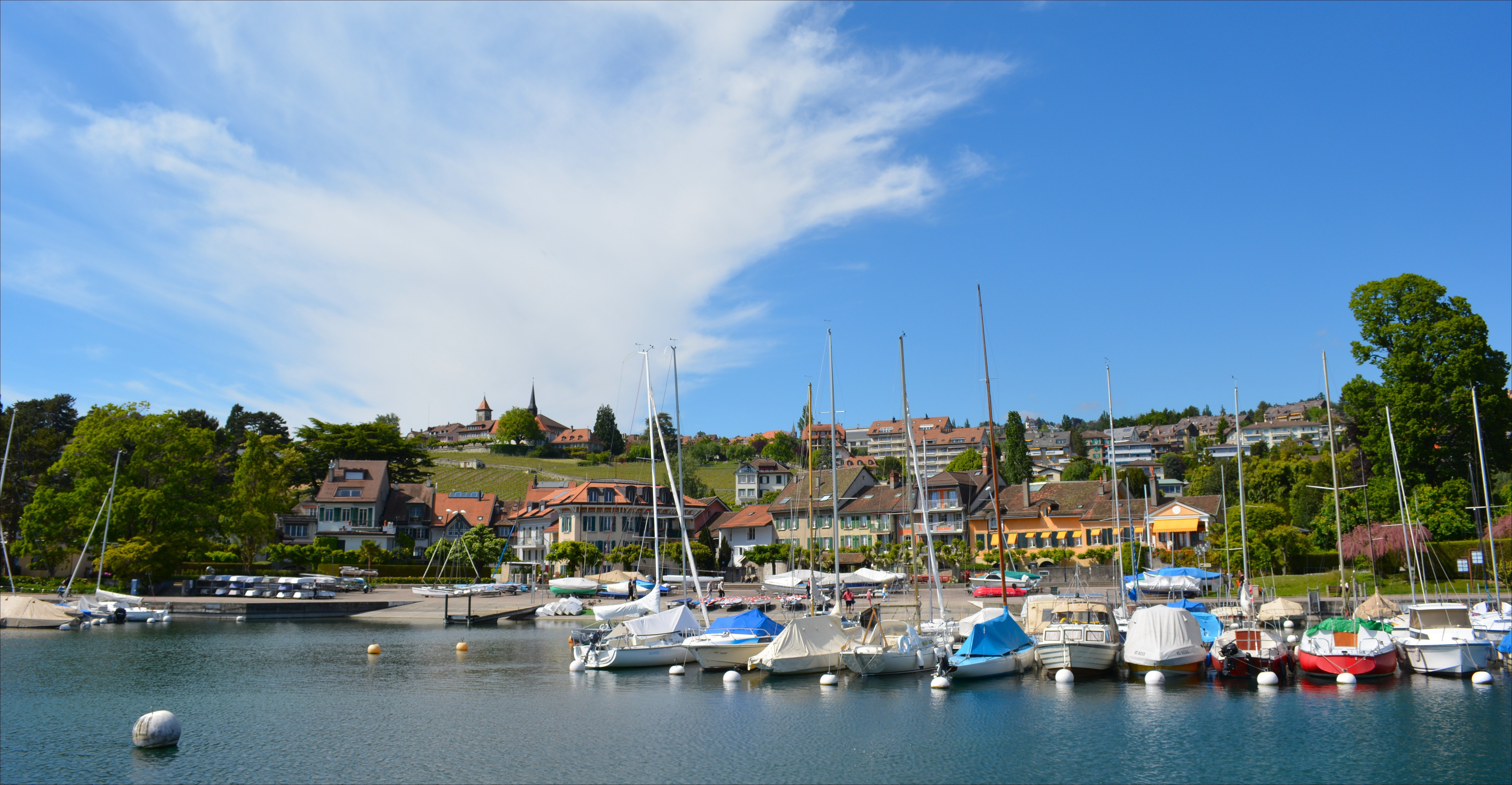
- Pully lake front

- Flag Coat of arms
- Location of Pully
- Location within Switzerland Location within Canton of Vaud
- Coordinates: 46°31′N 6°40′E
- Country: Switzerland
- Canton: Vaud
- District: Lavaux-Oron

Government
  - Mayor: Syndic; Gil Reichen

Area
  - Total: 5.91 km^{2} (2.28 sq mi)
- Elevation: 426 m (1,398 ft)
- Highest elevation: 800 m (2,600 ft)
- Lowest elevation (Lake Geneva): 375 m (1,230 ft)

Population (December 2007)
  - Total: 16,680
  - Density: 2,820/km^{2} (7,310/sq mi)
- Time zone: UTC+01:00 (CET)
  - Summer (DST): UTC+02:00 (CEST)
- Postal code: 1009
- SFOS number: 5590
- ISO 3166 code: CH-VD
- Surrounded by: Belmont-sur-Lausanne, Lausanne, Lugrin (FR-74), Paudex, Savigny
- Twin towns: Obernai (France)
- Website: www.pully.ch

Pully (French: [pyji]) is a municipality in Switzerland in the canton of Vaud, located in the district of Lavaux-Oron. It is one of the eastern suburbs of the city of Lausanne, located on the shores of Lake Geneva (Lac Léman) and at the foot of the vineyards of Lavaux on the road to Vevey and Montreux.

== History ==
Pully is first mentioned in 994 as Pulliacum.

=== Prehistory ===
In 1826 a Neolithic cemetery with about 30 graves was uncovered at Pierra-Portray. However, the artifacts were not fully preserved and only one flint blade and a soapstone fragment still exist. Near Pierra-Portray, along the Chemin de Chamblandes, Albert Naef examined 23 tombs from 1901 to 1910. These tombs belonging to a similar set of tombs which were sporadically excavated and recorded between 1880 and 1993. The local rectangular graves consisted of boxes assembled from four vertical slabs of about 1 meter (3.3 ft) in length, with a fifth plate that served as a lid. The dead were lying on their left side with their legs drawn up to the chest and the head pointed to the east. The largest find of stone box graves in Pully was the cemetery at Chamblandes. Due to the number of finds at Chamblandes, all similar cist or stone box graves in the surrounding area came to be known as Chamblandes type graves. The cemetery of Chamblandes extends over a length of about a hundred meters (yards) and included 76 graves and over 100 skeletons. This Middle Neolithic (4300-3900 BC) graveyard included as grave goods; ocher, various commodities (polished stone ax) and jewelry (wild boar tusks, pendants made of shells, coral and lignite). Two collars, one needle, a dagger and a bronze knife-blade hatchet are attributed to an early Bronze Age grave. In 1992 a cremation grave was discovered that dated from the Late Bronze Age.

=== Roman villa ===
In the 1970s, while working on foundation of a terrace of the Le Prieuré building, the corner of a large Roman era villa was discovered. The villa dates from the period between the second half of the 1st century and 4th century AD. The accompanying small thermal baths, a monumental pool and several walls were already known from earlier excavations. The heart of the east wing of the villa is a multi-level, semi-circular pavilion. The lower hall is decorated with, in situ preserved, wall paintings which represent a chariot race. The painting dates from the first quarter of the 2nd century. Finds from the 4th and 5th centuries show that the site was also, at least partially populated, during the late antiquity period. Between the 5th and 6th century, the baths were converted into a Christian burial chapel with numerous burials.

=== Medieval Pully ===
During the Carolingian era the additional buildings were built around the burial chapel. During the Early Middle Ages (5th-7th century) a cemetery was operating at Les Déserts.

In the 10th century the royal family of Burgundy granted their vineyards at Pully to Payerne Priory. The priory retained this land in Pully until 1536. In 1079, Bishop Burkhard of Oltigen received some property from the Emperor in Pully. This land had previously belonged to Rudolf of Swabia. From then on, the Bishop of Lausanne possessed the jurisdiction right over the bailiwick of Pully. The Bishop first granted the bailiwick to the Lords of Faucigny, then in 1276 to the de Thoire-Villars family. Two officers, the Sautier or Weibel and the Seneschal, were responsible for the judiciary. The Counts of Geneva, the Geneva-Lullin family, were the Seneschals until 1536 and were practically the rulers of Pully. A number of other religious and secular leaders owned land or rights in the village. Until 1555, the Counts of Gruyère were one of the largest landowners in the area. In 1509, Bern and Fribourg mediated between the Count of Gruyere and the citizens of Pully. The market buildings in Pully were used until at least 1558.

The municipality began to become a partly independent town in the 13th century and received its charter (plaict général) in 1368. The town was administered by a twelve-member council until 1719, when it became an eleven-member group. The council was led by a knight banneret.

=== Early Modern and Modern Pully ===
In 1536, the town of Pully came under the administration of the cities of Bern and Lausanne. Lausanne renounced their rights in 1717. From 1536 until 1798 it belonged to the Bailiwick of Lausanne. Then, from 1798 until 2006, it was in the district of Lausanne. The Le Prieuré building was originally the priory court of the Priory of Payerne. Under the Bernese it served as a wine cellar and vineyard house.

The original parish church was probably dedicated to St. Maurice starting in the 9th century. Between the 14th and 16th century, it was rebuilt and consecrated to St. Germann. It burned down in 2001 and was rebuilt again in 2004. After the Reformation, the parish also included Paudex and Belmont, which became independent in 1897. The parsonage was built between 1594 and rebuilt in 1723. The church in Chamblandes dates from 1938, the one in La Rosiaz from 1953 and the Catholic Parish of St. Mauritius was created in 1954.

== Geography ==
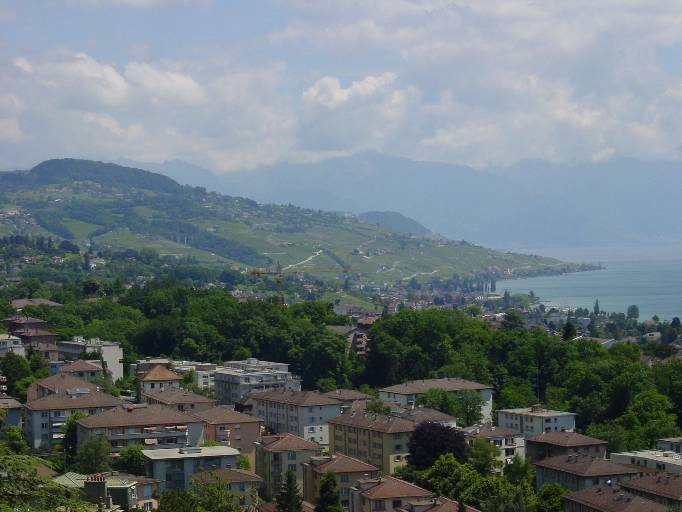
Pully, as seen from Lausanne

Aerial view from 800 m by Walter Mittelholzer (1919)

Pully has an area, as of 2009, of 5.85–5.91 square kilometers (2.26–2.28 mi^{2}) (depending on calculation method). Of this area, 1.2 km^{2} (0.46 mi^{2}) or 20.5% is used for agricultural purposes, while 1.41 km^{2} (0.54 mi^{2}) or 24.1% is forested. Of the rest of the land, 3.28 km^{2} (1.27 mi^{2}) or 56.1% is settled (buildings or roads), 0.01 km^{2} (2.5 acres) or 0.2% is either rivers or lakes and 0.01 km^{2} (2.5 acres) or 0.2% is unproductive land.

Of the built up area, housing and buildings made up 37.3% and transportation infrastructure made up 13.2%. while parks, green belts and sports fields made up 4.4%. Out of the forested land, all of the forested land area is covered with heavy forests. Of the agricultural land, 13.2% is used for growing crops and 4.8% is pastures, while 2.6% is used for orchards or vine crops. All the water in the municipality is flowing water.

The municipality was part of the Lausanne District until it was dissolved on 31 August 2006, and Pully became part of the new district of Lavaux-Oron.

The municipality stretches from Lake Geneva to the Jorat and includes the peak of Monts-de-Pully at an elevation of 806 m (2,644 ft). It consists of the village section of Chamblandes, La Perraudettaz, Port, Rochettaz and La Rosiaz.

=== Climate ===
Pully has an average of 117.7 days of rain or snow per year and on average receives 1,132 mm (44.6 in) of precipitation. The wettest month is May during which time Pully receives an average of 113 mm (4.4 in) of rain or snow. During this month there is precipitation for an average of 11.7 days. The driest month of the year is February with an average of 64 mm (2.5 in) of precipitation over 8.5 days. The Köppen climate classification subtype for this climate is "Cfb" (Marine West Coast Climate).

Climate data for Pully, elevation 456 m (1,496 ft), (1991–2020)
| Month | Jan | Feb | Mar | Apr | May | Jun | Jul | Aug | Sep | Oct | Nov | Dec | Year |
|---|---|---|---|---|---|---|---|---|---|---|---|---|---|
| Mean daily maximum °C (°F) | 4.7 (40.5) | 5.9 (42.6) | 10.5 (50.9) | 14.6 (58.3) | 18.9 (66.0) | 22.8 (73.0) | 25.0 (77.0) | 24.5 (76.1) | 19.8 (67.6) | 14.6 (58.3) | 8.9 (48.0) | 5.4 (41.7) | 14.6 (58.3) |
| Daily mean °C (°F) | 2.7 (36.9) | 3.3 (37.9) | 7.0 (44.6) | 10.6 (51.1) | 14.6 (58.3) | 18.4 (65.1) | 20.5 (68.9) | 20.1 (68.2) | 16.0 (60.8) | 11.7 (53.1) | 6.7 (44.1) | 3.5 (38.3) | 11.3 (52.3) |
| Mean daily minimum °C (°F) | 0.7 (33.3) | 0.8 (33.4) | 3.7 (38.7) | 6.8 (44.2) | 10.7 (51.3) | 14.3 (57.7) | 16.2 (61.2) | 16.2 (61.2) | 12.7 (54.9) | 9.1 (48.4) | 4.5 (40.1) | 1.5 (34.7) | 8.1 (46.6) |
| Average precipitation mm (inches) | 75.4 (2.97) | 63.5 (2.50) | 71.8 (2.83) | 83.6 (3.29) | 112.6 (4.43) | 106.8 (4.20) | 102.7 (4.04) | 109.6 (4.31) | 98.4 (3.87) | 110.9 (4.37) | 99.2 (3.91) | 97.7 (3.85) | 1,132.2 (44.57) |
| Average snowfall cm (inches) | 10.9 (4.3) | 14.3 (5.6) | 1.6 (0.6) | 0.2 (0.1) | 0.0 (0.0) | 0.0 (0.0) | 0.0 (0.0) | 0.0 (0.0) | 0.0 (0.0) | 0.0 (0.0) | 1.1 (0.4) | 7.0 (2.8) | 35.1 (13.8) |
| Average precipitation days (≥ 1.0 mm) | 9.8 | 8.5 | 9.0 | 9.2 | 11.7 | 9.9 | 9.6 | 9.5 | 8.9 | 10.3 | 10.4 | 10.9 | 117.7 |
| Average snowy days (≥ 1.0 cm) | 2.9 | 2.8 | 1.3 | 0.1 | 0.0 | 0.0 | 0.0 | 0.0 | 0.0 | 0.0 | 0.8 | 1.9 | 9.8 |
| Average relative humidity (%) | 78 | 73 | 68 | 64 | 67 | 66 | 64 | 67 | 73 | 78 | 79 | 79 | 71 |
| Mean monthly sunshine hours | 76.7 | 108.8 | 168.9 | 193.1 | 212.6 | 239.7 | 258.6 | 241.3 | 187.9 | 131.7 | 79.5 | 58.3 | 1,957.1 |
| Percentage possible sunshine | 29 | 39 | 48 | 50 | 49 | 55 | 59 | 59 | 53 | 41 | 30 | 23 | 47 |
Source 1: NOAA
Source 2: MeteoSwiss (snow 1981–2010)

== Coat of arms ==
The blazon of the municipal coat of arms is Per pale Argent and Gules, overall a Grape-bunch counterchanged leaved Vert.

== Demographics ==
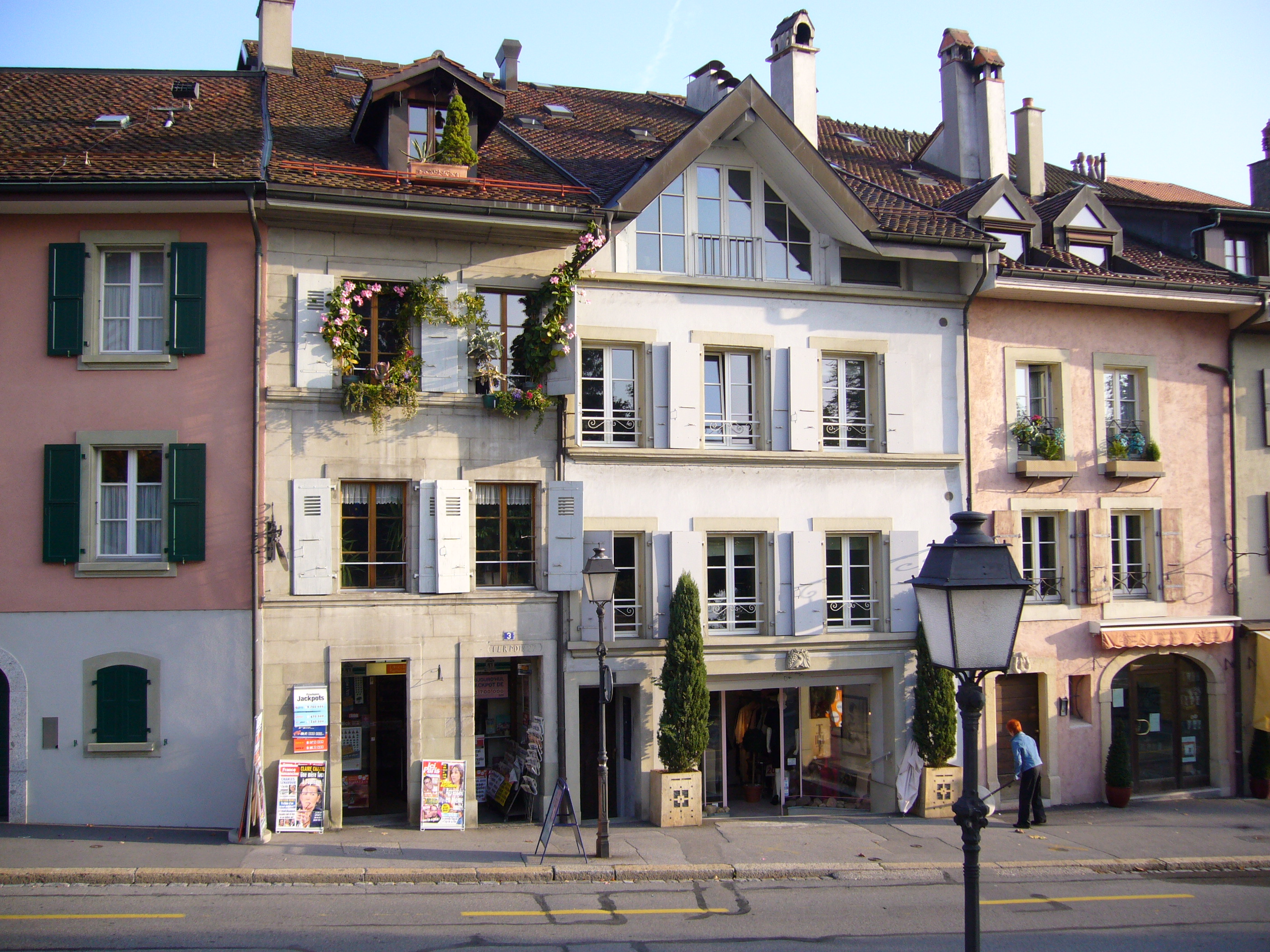
Houses in Pully

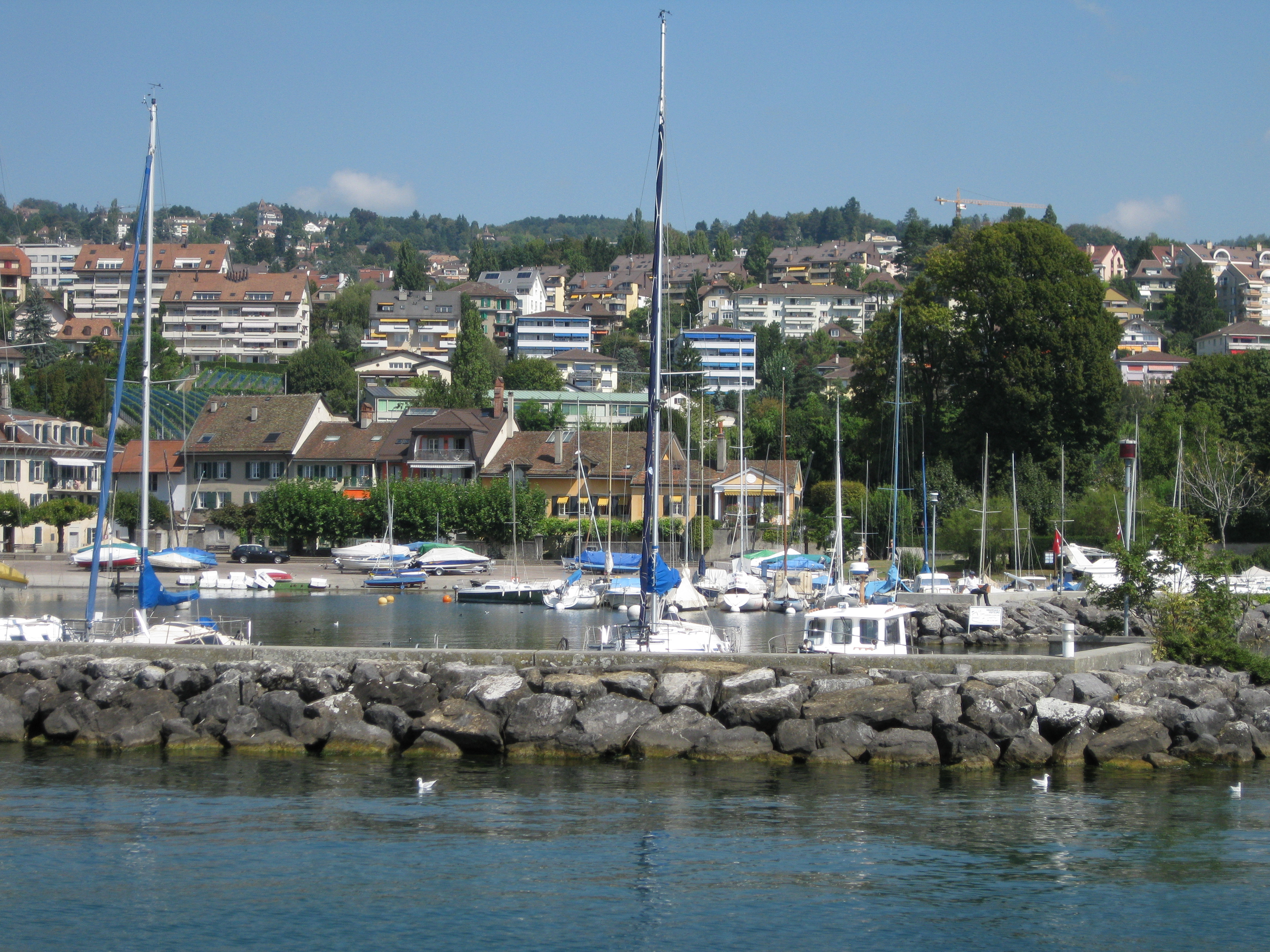
Pully lake front and port

Pully has a population (as of December 2020) of 18,694. As of 2008, 27.3% of the population are resident foreign nationals. Over the last 10 years (1999–2009) the population has changed at a rate of 6.8%. It has changed at a rate of 7.3% due to migration and at a rate of -0.2% due to births and deaths.

Most of the population (as of 2000) speaks French (13,270 or 82.8%), with German being second most common (774 or 4.8%) and Italian being third (453 or 2.8%). There are 3 people who speak Romansh.

Of the population in the municipality 2,669 or about 16.6% were born in Pully and lived there in 2000. There were 5,190 or 32.4% who were born in the same canton, while 2,824 or 17.6% were born somewhere else in Switzerland, and 4,928 or 30.7% were born outside of Switzerland.

In 2008 there were 106 live births to Swiss citizens and 40 births to non-Swiss citizens, and in same time span there were 157 deaths of Swiss citizens and 12 non-Swiss citizen deaths. Ignoring immigration and emigration, the population of Swiss citizens decreased by 51 while the foreign population increased by 28. There were 9 Swiss men who emigrated from Switzerland and 2 Swiss women who immigrated back to Switzerland. At the same time, there were 128 non-Swiss men and 147 non-Swiss women who immigrated from another country to Switzerland. The total Swiss population change in 2008 (from all sources, including moves across municipal borders) was a decrease of 71 and the non-Swiss population increased by 227 people. This represents a population growth rate of 0.9%.

The age distribution, as of 2009, in Pully is; 1,568 children or 9.2% of the population are between 0 and 9 years old and 1,814 teenagers or 10.6% are between 10 and 19. Of the adult population, 1,608 people or 9.4% of the population are between 20 and 29 years old. 2,294 people or 13.4% are between 30 and 39, 2,571 people or 15.1% are between 40 and 49, and 2,205 people or 12.9% are between 50 and 59. The senior population distribution is 2,236 people or 13.1% of the population are between 60 and 69 years old, 1,610 people or 9.4% are between 70 and 79, there are 972 people or 5.7% who are between 80 and 89, and there are 201 people or 1.2% who are 90 and older.

As of 2000, there were 5,999 people who were single and never married in the municipality. There were 7,763 married individuals, 1,110 widows or widowers and 1,162 individuals who are divorced.

As of 2000, there were 7,539 private households in the municipality, and an average of 2.1 persons per household. There were 3,013 households that consist of only one person and 292 households with five or more people. Out of a total of 7,690 households that answered this question, 39.2% were households made up of just one person and there were 36 adults who lived with their parents. Of the rest of the households, there are 2,090 married couples without children, 1,829 married couples with children. There were 439 single parents with a child or children. There were 132 households that were made up of unrelated people and 151 households that were made up of some sort of institution or another collective housing.

In 2000 there were 706 single family homes (or 37.4% of the total) out of a total of 1,888 inhabited buildings. There were 823 multi-family buildings (43.6%), along with 274 multi-purpose buildings that were mostly used for housing (14.5%) and 85 other use buildings (commercial or industrial) that also had some housing (4.5%). Of the single family homes 123 were built before 1919, while 21 were built between 1990 and 2000. The greatest number of single family homes (249) were built between 1919 and 1945. The most multi-family homes (185) were built between 1946 and 1960 and the next most (159) were built before 1919. There were 30 multi-family houses built between 1996 and 2000.

In 2000 there were 8,248 apartments in the municipality. The most common apartment size was 3 rooms of which there were 2,230. There were 502 single room apartments and 2,241 apartments with five or more rooms. Of these apartments, a total of 7,348 apartments (89.1% of the total) were permanently occupied, while 738 apartments (8.9%) were seasonally occupied and 162 apartments (2.0%) were empty. As of 2009, the construction rate of new housing units was 4 new units per 1000 residents. The vacancy rate for the municipality, in 2010, was 0.27%.

The historical population is given in the following chart:

== Heritage sites of national significance ==
The Gardens of Villa Eupalinos and the Roman villa at Prieuré are listed as Swiss heritage sites of national significance. The entire urban village of Pully is part of the Inventory of Swiss Heritage Sites.

== Politics ==
In the 2007 federal election the most popular party was the SP which received 19.61% of the vote. The next three most popular parties were the SVP (17.79%), the FDP (15.48%) and the Green Party (13.96%). In the federal election, a total of 5,123 votes were cast, and the voter turnout was 50.5%.

== Economy ==
As of 2010, Pully had an unemployment rate of 4.4%. As of 2008, there were 27 people employed in the primary economic sector and about 9 businesses involved in this sector. 427 people were employed in the secondary sector and there were 71 businesses in this sector. 4,287 people were employed in the tertiary sector, with 565 businesses in this sector. There were 7,822 residents of the municipality who were employed in some capacity, of which females made up 47.2% of the workforce.

In 2008 the total number of full-time equivalent jobs was 3,961. The number of jobs in the primary sector was 21, of which 18 were in agriculture and 3 were in forestry or lumber production. The number of jobs in the secondary sector was 399 of which 56 or (14.0%) were in manufacturing and 322 (80.7%) were in construction. The number of jobs in the tertiary sector was 3,541. In the tertiary sector; 560 or 15.8% were in wholesale or retail sales or the repair of motor vehicles, 46 or 1.3% were in the movement and storage of goods, 160 or 4.5% were in a hotel or restaurant, 154 or 4.3% were in the information industry, 325 or 9.2% were the insurance or financial industry, 936 or 26.4% were technical professionals or scientists, 438 or 12.4% were in education and 432 or 12.2% were in health care.

In 2000, there were 3,551 workers who commuted into the municipality and 6,070 workers who commuted away. The municipality is a net exporter of workers, with about 1.7 workers leaving the municipality for every one entering. About 1.3% of the workforce coming into Pully are coming from outside Switzerland, while 0.1% of the locals commute out of Switzerland for work. Of the working population, 28.7% used public transportation to get to work, and 53.9% used a private car. Significant entities headquartered in Pully include: ECOM Agroindustrial; Naftiran Intertrade (commodities); Sandoz Family Foundation (philanthropy); Tetra Laval (packaging).

== Transportation ==
Despite being a tiny town, Pully has 2 train stations, called Pully-Nord and Pully. This is because the train line leaving Lausanne toward the east splits in two, with one line heading northwards toward Bern and the other heading east toward the Simplon Tunnel, each passing through Pully. Both stations are served by trains of the RER Vaud commuter rail network.

== Religion ==
From the 2000 census, 5,953 or 37.1% were Roman Catholic, while 5,730 or 35.7% belonged to the Swiss Reformed Church. Of the rest of the population, there were 310 members of an Orthodox church (or about 1.93% of the population), there were 17 individuals (or about 0.11% of the population) who belonged to the Christian Catholic Church, and there were 449 individuals (or about 2.80% of the population) who belonged to another Christian church. There were 246 individuals (or about 1.53% of the population) who were Jewish, and 383 (or about 2.39% of the population) who were Islamic. There were 43 individuals who were Buddhist, 25 individuals who were Hindu and 44 individuals who belonged to another church. 2,288 (or about 14.27% of the population) belonged to no church, are agnostic or atheist, and 748 individuals (or about 4.67% of the population) did not answer the question.

== Education ==
In Pully about 5,457 or (34.0%) of the population have completed non-mandatory upper secondary education, and 4,353 or (27.1%) have completed additional higher education (either university or a Fachhochschule). Of the 4,353 who completed tertiary schooling, 45.6% were Swiss men, 31.2% were Swiss women, 12.9% were non-Swiss men and 10.3% were non-Swiss women.

In the 2009/2010 school year there were a total of 1,488 students in the Pully school district. In the Vaud cantonal school system, two years of non-obligatory pre-school are provided by the political districts. During the school year, the political district provided pre-school care for a total of 665 children of which 232 children (34.9%) received subsidized pre-school care. The canton's primary school program requires students to attend for four years. There were 748 students in the municipal primary school program. The obligatory lower secondary school program lasts for six years and there were 728 students in those schools. There were also 12 students who were home schooled or attended another non-traditional school.

As of 2000, there were 1,597 students in Pully who came from another municipality, while 699 residents attended schools outside the municipality.

Pully is home to the Bibliothèque communale library. The library has (as of 2008) 35,969 books or other media, and loaned out 60,692 items in the same year. It was open a total of 206 days with average of 28 hours per week during that year.

Collège Champittet, an international school, has its Pully campus in the commune.

== Culture ==
Pully is home to some museums:

- The Centre Général Guisan. In 2009 it was visited by 1,323 visitors (the average in previous years was 1,482).
- Roman Villa of Pully
- Art Museum of Pully (it was founded in 1949 as the “Musée du Vieux Pully” following the donation of a traditional vineyard house to the city by local patrons. Originally focused on local heritage, it has since evolved into a visual arts institution showcasing both historical and contemporary art exhibition).

It also has a theatre (Théâtre de l'Octogone) and a cinema (Cinéma city club).

== Notable people ==
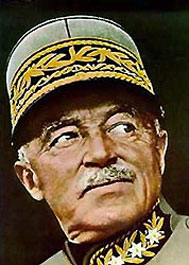
General Henri Guisan

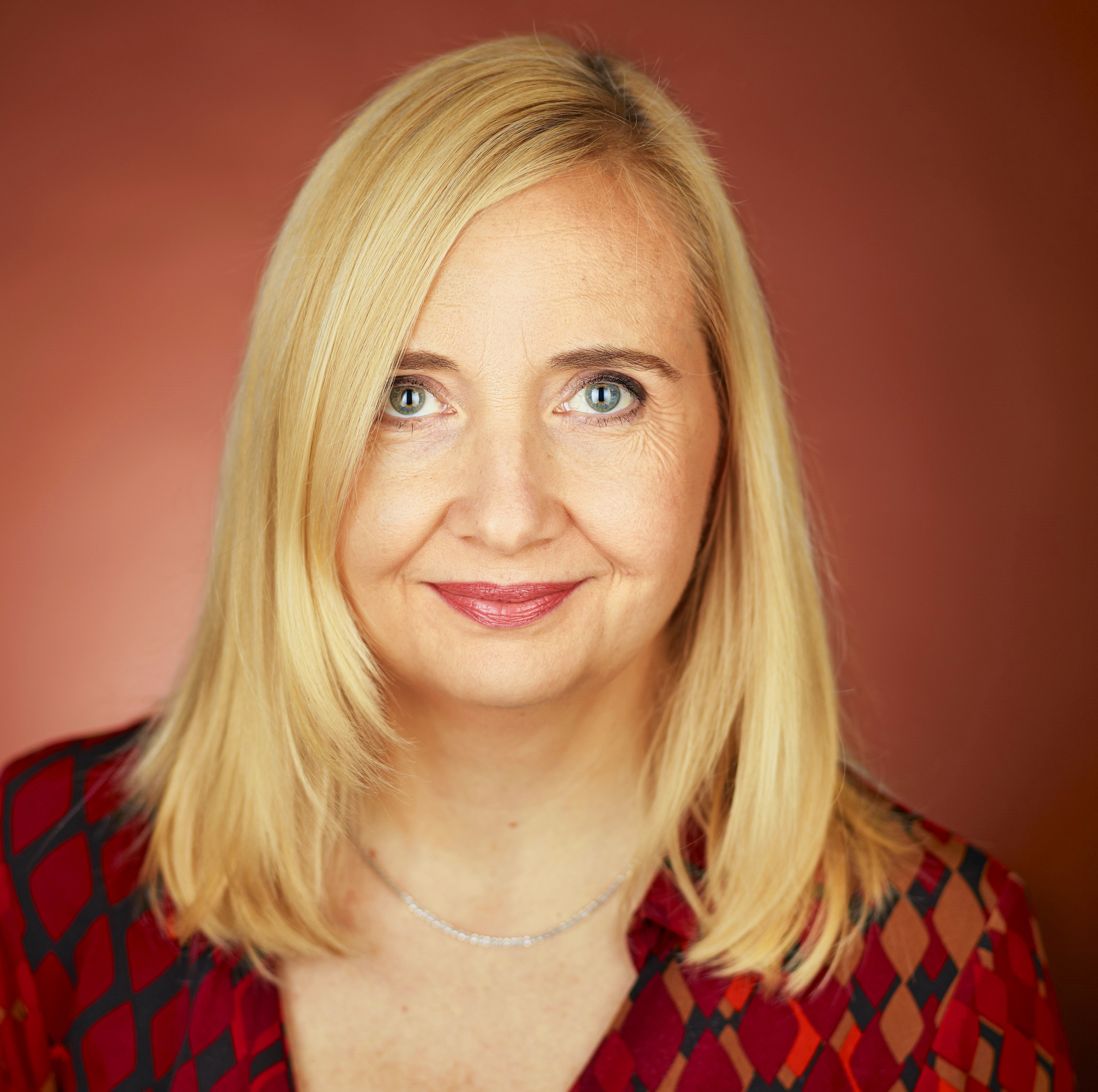
M. Schmid Mast, 2016

- René Auberjonois (1872–1957) a Swiss Post-Impressionist painter, lived in Pully 1929-1934
- Henri Guisan (1874–1960), General of the Swiss Army during WWII, lived in Pully until his death.
- Rodolphe Archibald Reiss (1875–1929), criminologist, lived in Pully in a house built for him by Alphonse Laverrière.
- Jeanne de Vietinghoff (1875–1926 in Pully), a Belgian writer, friend of the mother of Marguerite Yourcenar
- Émile-Robert Blanchet (1877–1943 in Pully), a French-speaking Swiss pianist and composer
- Charles-Ferdinand Ramuz (1878–1947), writer, lived in Pully until his death.
- Jascha Horenstein (1898–1973), an American orchestra conductor, lived in Pully from 1959 until his death
- Bhumibol Adulyadej (1927–2016), King of Thailand, lived in Pully on and off between 1933 and 1951.
- Asa Lanova (1933–2017 in Pully), a Swiss dancer and Suisse Romande author
- Édouard Chambost (1942–2009), lawyer and writer, lived in Pully
- Pierre du Bois de Dunilac (1943–2007 in Pully), writer, political scientist and humanist, lived in Pully
- François Hollande (born 1954), President of France 2012/2017, visited Pully on family holidays as a child.
- Luc Recordon (born 1955 in Pully), a Swiss politician
- Marianne Schmid Mast (born ca. 1975), is Professor of Organizational Behavior at the HEC Lausanne, lives in Pully
- Alexandra Nereïev (born 1976), a French painter, sculptor, jewelry-maker and writer. Lives in Pully
