= Alexandra Nereïev =

French painter

- Born: Alexandra Gil; 1 May 1976 (age 50); Le Chesnay, France
- Known for: Painting, drawing, sculpture, writing
- Movement: Stuckism realism
- Patrons: Peter Keller – Bruno Richard

Alexandra Nereïev (born Alexandra Gil, 1 May 1976) is a French painter, sculptor, jewelry-maker and writer living in Pully, Switzerland. Nereïev was born in Le Chesnay, France and was graduated from the art school Maryse Eloy Maryse Eloy in 1999.

She left France in 2011 to move to Locarno and then moved to French Switzerland in 2013.

Fondator of the workshop gallery Latzarine in Lagny sur Marne, France open from 2002 to 2006 where most of her expositions take place.

Her approach remains faithful to the figurative art, her favourite themes being self-portraits, nudes and landscapes. The artist regularly frequent the free sketch workshop of the Académie de la Grande Chaumière in Paris.

== Expositions ==
- 2003 – "La féerie" Latzarine Gallery 24 rue Vacheresse, Lagny sur Marne, France.
- 2004 – "Monde organique" Latzarine Gallery 24 rue Vacheresse, Lagny sur Marne, France.
- 2005 – "Divergences et cruauté" public reading of poems, piano concert and fine stone made jewelry exposition. Latzarine Gallery 24 rue Vacheresse, Lagny sur Marne, France.
- 2006 – "Retour à la Nature" exposition of a fleeting canvas destined to be destroyed. Latzarine Gallery, 24 rue Vacheresse, Lagny sur Marne, France.
- 2009 – "Private sellings in La Sauvagine, France.
- 2011 – "Hommage à Patricia" Private selling in La Toretta, Ascona, Switzerland.

== Major works ==
- 2000 – Toscane – Oil painting
- 2000 – Les trois grâces – Oil painting triptych.
- 2001 – Nu à la Grande Chaumière – Oil painting
- 2006 – Fumeuse d'opium – Oil painting
- 2011 – Femme au gant rouge (inspired by Isabelle Huppert in the movie "My little princess") – Oil painting
- 2012 – Roussalka- Oil painting
- 2013 – Nudité à Kiel – Oil painting

== Limited print run books ==
- La saga des Ruskova – self-edited novel written in 2009
- Feuilles d'ambre et poudre à Canons – self-edited novel written in 2012 – ISBN 978-1-62018-047-1

== Sources ==
- Alexandra Nereïev's official website
- http://typofonderie.com/gazette/post/rudi-meyer-peter-keller/
- elica editions
- Cercle d'art contemporain du Cailar France
