= Rozālija Purgale =

Latvian judge

Rozālija Purgāle (May 1, 1904 - March 2, 1984) was the first female judge in Latvia. From 1923, she studied at the Faculty of Economics and Law at the University of Latvia. In 1933, she worked as Deputy Attorney General of the Latgale Regional Court and in the same year, she was appointed as a magistrate and worked as a judge until the occupation of Latvia in 1940.
