= Jeanne de Vietinghoff =

Belgian writer

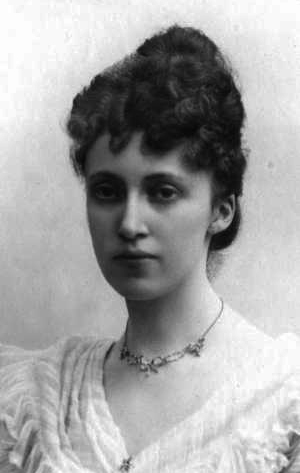
- Born: Jeanne Céline Emma Bricou; 31 December 1875; Schaerbeek, Brussels-Capital Region, Belgium
- Died: 15 June 1926 (aged 50); Pully, Vaud, Switzerland
- Occupation: Writer

Jeanne de Vietinghoff (31 December 1875 – 15 June 1926) was a Belgian writer who published several books on ethical, mystical and religious topics. She was the mother of the painter and philosopher Egon von Vietinghoff.

== Life ==
Jeanne Céline Emma Bricou was born on 31 December 1875 in Schaerbeek, now a district of Brussels, Belgium. Her parents were Alexis Pierre Joseph Bricou, a chandler and trader in sponges and chamois leather at the Nouveau Marché aux Grains, 9, in Brussels (Note: Jeanne's biography by Egon von Vietinghoff-Stiftung on The Egon von Vietinghoff Foundation website claims that her father was an architect, but in reality he was a merchant. The 1857 Brussels Almanach du commerce et de l'industrie lists a "Bricou-Koch (A.), trader in sponges and chamois leather at the Nouveau Marché aux Grains, 9. The 1868 electoral lists for Schaerbeek show Bricou (Alexis-Pierre-Joseph), merchant, rue du Progrès, 121, born in 1824 in Brussels. The Moniteur Belge of 1873 show Alexis Bricou as a merchant in Schaerbeek doing business under his own name. We also find Pierre Joseph Alexis Bricou, "commis négociant", born in Brussels, 19 September 1824, son of late Pierre Bricou and Françoise Piron, married in Ixelles 1 October 1850 (n° 96), Hermanna (Hermanne) Koch, born in Weesp (North Holland) 29 May 1825 and died 19 May 1852, daughter of Statius Frederik Koch, négociant in Saint-Josse-ten-Noode, and Helena Elisabeth Keiser. ( Marriage announced in Algemeen handelsblad, 2 octobre 1850. see also : Historische Kranten : ). In second wedding Pierre Joseph Alexis' Bricou, négociant nouveau marché aux Grains in Brussels, widower of Hermanne Koch, married in Brussels 13 September 1855 (n° 995), Gesina Cornelia van Duura, residing in Brussels boulevard de Waterloo, born in Rotterdam 14 August 1834, daughter of Passchier Van Duura, fabricant, and Zwaantje Van Riet (Wedding announced in Nieuwe Rotterdamsche courant, 15 September 1855).) (1825–77), and his third wife Emma Antoinette Isaure Storm de Grave (1841–1933), who came from a patrician Dutch family. She was their only child, and her father died when she was 18 months old. Although she was a Protestant she received her secondary education at the Catholic Sacré-Coeur convent school in Jette, on the outskirts of Brussels. The Francophone boarding school was run by the Sisters of the Sacred Heart. Jeanne was sent there to perfect her French. Her closest friend there was Fernande Cartier de Marchienne, who would be the mother of the writer Marguerite Yourcenar. The two girls formed an intimate relationship.

Jeanne met the Baltic German Baron Conrad von Vietinghoff at a lecture on a spiritual topic in Dresden, and married him on 17 April 1902 in the Hague, Netherlands. Her husband was a musician. They lived for about two years in Courland, Latvia, home of Conrad's parents, then in Saint Petersburg and in Germany before moving to Holland. They had two sons: Egon (1903) and Alexis (1904). In 1905 Jeanne learned of her former classmate Fernande's death, and wrote inviting her husband Michel de Crayencour to come with his daughter Marguerite for a vacation at her mother's summer house in Scheveningen, by the sea. The young Egon de Vietinghoff recalled spending time on the beach with Marguerite Yourcenar, who was the same age as him.

Jeanne and her husband shared a common sense of dignity, integrity, ethics and religion, and their home became a meeting place for people interested in art and intellectual discussion. They lived in Paris, Wiesbaden, Geneva and Zürich. Visitors included Romain Rolland, Maurice Maeterlinck, Guy de Pourtalès, Pablo Casals and Carl Schuricht. The family often visited Jeanne's mother in the Netherlands, and travelled in France, Italy, Germany, the Baltic States and Switzerland, sometimes taking the children's governess with them. Despite this busy life, Jeanne took the time to write five books of reflections on life, the soul, personal crises, spiritual development and the divine influence. She developed liver cancer at the age of 50. She died on 15 June 1926 in Pully, near Lausanne, Switzerland. She was buried in the Jouxtens cemetery above Lake Geneva near Lausanne.

Marguerite Yourcenar published a tribute to Jeanne de Vietinghoff in La Revue Mondiale. Towards the end she wrote,

I have neglected to say how beautiful she herself was. She was still almost young when she died, before the trials of old age came, which she did not fear. Much more than her writing, it is her life which gives me the impression of perfection.... Had Jeanne de Vietinghoff written nothing, her character would be no less lofty. Only, many of us would never have known it. It is the way of the world that the rarest virtues of a person always remain the secret of someone else.... Life on earth, which she loved so much, was for her only the visible side of life eternal. No doubt she accepted death as a night darker than the others, but one which would be followed by a more shining dawn. One would like to believe she was not mistaken. One would like to believe that the dissolution in the tomb did not arrest such a rare development; one would like to believe that death, for such souls, is merely one further step.

== Publication ==
Publications included:

- Jeanne Bricou Vietinghoff (1909), Impressions d'âme, Paris: Fischbacher, p. 211
- Jeanne Bricou Vietinghoff (1912), La Liberté intérieure, fig. par la Bonne B. de Wolff, Paris: Fischbacher, p. 299
- Jeanne Bricou Vietinghoff (1915), L'intelligence du bien, Paris: Fischbacher, p. 217
- Jeanne Bricou Vietinghoff (1923), Au seuil d'un monde nouveau, Paris: Fischbacher, p. 184
- Jeanne Bricou Vietinghoff (1924), L'Autre devoir, histoire d'une âme (novel), Neuchâtel et Genève; Paris: Éditions Forum, p. 386
- Jeanne Bricou Vietinghoff (1927), Sur l'art de vivre, Précédé d'une notice biographique, par Mme Hélène Naville, Paris: Fischbacher, p. 50

== Sources ==
- Jeanne Bricou Vietinghoff (baronne de, 1875–1926): nom d'alliance (in French), BnF: Bibliotheque nationale de France
- Listes électorales de Schaerbeek (in French), Schaerbeek: imprimerie de H. Vandenhoute, rue de la Poste, 166, 1868
- Moniteur Belge (in French), 1873
- Savigneau, Josyane (1993), Marguerite Yourcenar: Inventing a Life, University of Chicago Press, ISBN 978-0-226-73544-3
- Tarlier, A. (1857), Almanach du commerce et de l'industrie, Brussels
- Vietinghoff-Stiftung, Egon von (January 2017), Jeanne de Vietinghoff (PDF) (in German)
