= Egon von Vietinghoff =

German painter

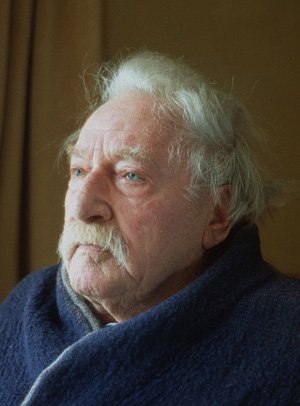
Von Vietinghoff in 1991

Egon Arnold Alexis Freiherr von Vietinghoff genannt Scheel (February 6, 1903 – October 14, 1994) was a German-Swiss painter, author and philosopher. He reconstructed the lost painting techniques of the Old Masters, and created some 2,700 paintings. He was the creator of the Egon von Vietinghoff Foundation.

== Life ==
Egon von Vietinghoff was born on February 6, 1903 in The Hague. He grew up in an artists’ house: his father Conrad von Vietinghoff was a pianist of German-Baltic origin, his mother Jeanne Bricou Vietinghoff, who had Belgian and Dutch ancestors, was a writer of philosophical books. He spent his childhood in France (Paris) and Germany (Wiesbaden), lived in Switzerland after 1913 (Geneva, Zuoz and finally Zurich). Born a Russian subject, he became a Swiss citizen in 1922, together with his parents and his brother. From 1922 to 1937 he lived in Germany (Munich), Italy (on the isle of Capri), France (again in Paris), Spain (on the island of Mallorca), Argentina (Buenos Aires), and Uruguay (near Atlántida). In 1937, he settled down in Switzerland, first in Zollikon and then in Zurich, and lived there until his death in 1994. Vietinghoff can be seen to be a real European when one considers his ancestors, his four wives who are natives of Italy, Switzerland, Germany, and Austria, and in particular his fluency in many European languages, his extensive knowledge of European literature, all of which combined to form a truly European mentality.

Egon von Vietinghoff started his career as an artist at age 17 and decided to finally lay down his paint brush at the age of 87 years. All his life he remained an outsider, unerring in his artistic judgment, and content to find his own path in life. Uncompromisingly he followed his artistic conscience, his visual perception and the urge to translate that perception it into painting.

He died on October 14, 1994 in Zurich.

== Technique ==
During 35 years of autonomous experimenting, from about 1923 until about 1958, Egon von Vietinghoff rediscovered the knowledge of multi-layer mixing of oil and resin not taught in technical handbooks and academies. Several liquid layers of color (glazes) can be applied either thick, semi-covering or translucent, one on top of the other. Different steps of light reflection bring about depth and color differentiations not possible in the same way by wet-on-wet painting. The plasticity thus obtained does not need any conspicuous construction of perspective. This knowledge is the basis of the color depth and the luminous power typical of Vietinghoff's paintings. His differentiated way of seeing required painting techniques which needed first-class natural substances produced with great care – including some indispensable colors of a chemical origin. He therefore produced himself the colors he needed. Even the necessary solvents and binders were prepared by him. Usually at least half of his time went into this manual preparation before he could start to paint. Another essential contribution to the natural effect, the convincing freshness, and the depth of color of his paintings is made by the main use of natural substances which were as pure as possible for the production of colors and binders. For this he used organic raw materials such as egg, casein, linseed and poppyseed oil, leather glue, wax, gum arabic, cherry tree resin, larch turpentine, fossil resin and different earths.

His "Handbuch zur Technik der Malerei" (Handbook of painting technique, in German only and out of print) is a compendium of all his work experiences. Here Vietinghoff brought in the sum total of his lifelong observations, defined the translucency of color (a property which have previously gone unnoticed in literature) and tackled the theory of chromatics as seen by the creative artist. Among other things, he gave practical ideas concerning color production, brushwork and picture composition, including examples of pictures of well-known masters and also his own work.

== Philosophy ==
Independently of current tendencies, he studied the originals of the Old Masters in order to put down his observations experimentally. Thus he discovers not only the technique of mixing oil and resin, but also the spiritual aspect of genuine works of art. In his terminology, the way of looking at things is called "vision", the painting making such visions visible "Transcendental painting". In order to perceive the world, he opened up to the phenomena of nature. However, it is not the surface of things he painted but their disintegration into color interactions taking place before his eyes. He reproduced a play of colors in which he submerges, and not a collection of individual narrative observations. Since the play of colors and light emanates from existing things his Transcendental painting is concrete, but inasmuch as it reproduces sensations and not measurable characteristics of things, it is at the same time the opposite of naturalism / realism. On the one hand Transcendental painting does not copy, and on the other hand it does not invent anything by means of intellectual construction. It looks for the nature of the world and by way of its sensations it reaches metaphysical insights. Thus Vietinghoff found an alternative to the extreme poles of naturalism realism and abstraction or of copy and construction. Departing from a philosophical and mystical concept, he understood imagination in the sense of creative ability as the possibility of the human spirit to perceive transcendently.

In artistic intensification, intuition – a sort of "seventh sense" – leads to inspiration and uses imagination as an organ of perception of the irrational, absolute reality which we can only divine temporarily with our limited view of the world. Imagination is therefore no original thought, no speculative dream-world, no willful reconstruction and no alienation of phenomena. Vietinghoff understood painting consistently in the sense of related to color, produced on the basis of nothing else but the visual function of the eyes, but not as abstract in the sense of geometric, plane-based or symbolic. Purely visual means based on purely sensual perception, unaltered by addition, alienation or mental intention – or in other words free of acquired knowledge. In years of meditative visual exercises, he opened himself to unintentional perception of the objects as color surfaces existing side by side; thus he made himself ready for inspiration. In this "school of pure vision" earlier understandings and assumptions of the materiality of things fade out: they disintegrate into individual color areas leaving the inner dynamics of light and color to be realized as the only facts. The three-dimensional things are temporarily translated by the artist into color planes placed side by side. The observer has no trouble to retransmit them into spatial seeing since human beings are used to seeing concretely. Opened up to experiences differing from the usual ones needed for the management of day by day life, the world appears as nothing more than the interaction of hues and shadings in a color context, i.e. as symphony of colors or as "drama of color and form", showing the observer an aspect differing from the one he knows already.

== Work ==
Egon von Vietinghoff used pencil, pen, crayon, etching-needle, brush. His most expressive paintings are in oil and resin, although he worked also in distemper and made portrait drawings in sanguine. Later on, he used distemper just as a priming coat on top of the grounding. The immense work of Egon von Vietinghoff includes all classical motifs: flowers, still lifes, landscapes, portraits, nudes, and figural scenes. Due to the large demand, more than half of his total work consists of fruit still lifes. The beholder's normal distance to the picture procures balanced representation and self-contained calm of the object. Without losing himself in details, Vietinghoff leads the eye through the whole spectrum of nuances of color and finds the balance between intensity and gentle peace. Thus, he created the impression of unity and harmonic interaction of object and background, light and shadow, form and color, detail and totality. Technically and mentally, Vietinghoff confronted the Old Masters and learned from them. However, he did not imitate or "quoted" them and found his own "handwriting" as a painter. His pictures convey naturalness and – without showy perspective – attract attention due to their plasticity, inner luminosity and masterly placed highlights.

== Publications ==
- Egon von Vietinghoff, DuMont's Handbuch zur Technik der Malerei (The handbook of painting technique), DuMont Cologne 1983 and 1991, ISBN 3-7701-1519-8 (only in German and out of print).
- Egon von Vietinghoff – Die Stiftung (1990). Introduction in English by the artist, illustrations of the paintings of the Foundation's collection (catalogue), Zurich 1990, private publishing.
- Alexander von Vietinghoff, Die visionäre Malerei des Egon von Vietinghoff (The transcendental Painting of Egon von Vietinghoff), Zurich 1997 by the Egon von Vietinghoff Foundation, ISBN 3-9521269-0-X (in German only).
- Bernd Lewandowski and Alexander von Vietinghoff, Die visionäre Malerei des Egon von Vietinghoff (The Transcendental Painting of E. v. V.), film (video) of a slide show, Hamburg 1996 (in German only).
