= Smiltene =

Town and capital of Smiltene Municipality, Latvia

- Town
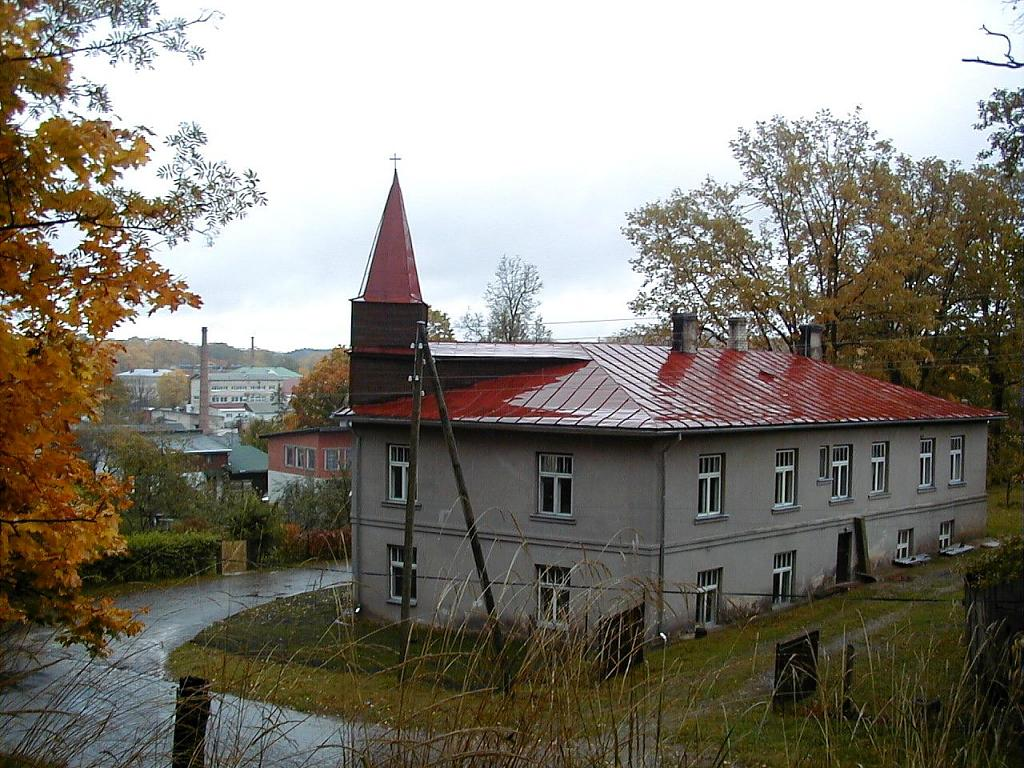

- Flag Coat of arms

- Location in Latvia
- Coordinates: 57°26′N 25°54′E
- Country: Latvia
- Municipality: Smiltene
- Town rights: 1920

Government
  - Mayor: Edgars Avotiņš

Area
  - Total: 7.20 km^{2} (2.78 sq mi)
  - Land: 6.93 km^{2} (2.68 sq mi)
  - Water: 0.27 km^{2} (0.10 sq mi)
- Elevation: 153 m (502 ft)

Population (2026)
  - Total: 4,994
  - Density: 721/km^{2} (1,870/sq mi)
- Time zone: UTC+2 (EET)
  - Summer (DST): UTC+3 (EEST)
- Postal code: LV-4729
- Calling code: +371 647
- Number of city council members: 15
- Website: http://www.smiltene.lv

Smiltene is a town in the Vidzeme region in northern Latvia, 132 km northeast of the capital Riga, and the administrative centre of Smiltene Municipality. It has a population of 5,536 (2015).

== Name ==
Its original name was Smiltesele (the ending probably came from the Russian "selo" - village), later it was called Smilten in German before adding the Latvian ending and thus becoming Smiltene.

== Geography ==
Smiltene is located in the northern part of the Vidzeme Highland on the banks of the river Abuls (Abula). It belongs to a historic Valka county and a modern Smiltene Municipality. Smiltene borders Smiltene Parish in the north, Launkalne Parish in the east and south. To the southwest of Smiltene is Branti Parish. The town centre is 106 metres above the sea level, the highest spot is on Klievu street - 145.14 metres above the sea level. There are three possible meteorite craters in Smiltene.

== History ==
The area around Smiltene was a part of the Latgalian lands of Tālava. After Crusaders had taken over most of the modern day Latvia, the area was part of the lands of the bishop of Riga. In 1359 on the steep hill near the river Abuls was built a castle. The tradesmen and craftsmen village around it - Smiltestele - first is mentioned in historical documents in 1427, since 1523 it was called a town. During the Livonian war, the castle and the town were brought to ruin by the army of Ivan the Terrible. Under Polish–Lithuanian Commonwealth Smiltene and the area surrounding it were controlled by the starosta Kaspar Mlodecki.

In the early stages of the Great Northern War, Smiltene was burnt down by the Russian army. After the war the area became devastated due to hunger and Bubonic plague. In 1708 the Swedish government built a new church and started the restoration of the village of Smiltene.

In 1760, the Russian empress Catherine II gave Smiltene manor as a present to the Governor-General Georg von Braun (Yuri Broun). During this time the manor was restored, from 1763 to 1771 were built manor buildings which have been still preserved. After the death of Braun, his heirs sold the manor to the Riga merchant J.S.Baundau whose family had it for almost 100 years.

In 1893, the Smiltene manor was bought by Paul Lieven (of the Lieven family of Baltic German aristocrats), who split the land into parcels – thus creating the foundations of the modern day city. In 1901 electricity was connected in the Smiltene manor house. For Lieven's money a hospital, sawmill and electric station were built in Smiltene in 1903. After his suggestion and with his financial support a narrow gauge railway was built from Smiltene to Valmiera.

In 1920, Smiltene was granted the town rights in the Latvian Republic. In 1935, there were more than 400 dwelling houses and many industrial companies in Smiltene. On September 22, 1944 during the retreat of the Nazi army at least 297 buildings were destroyed in Smiltene.

In 1950, Smiltene become the administrative centre of the newly created Smiltene district. In 1959 the district was merged with Valka district, which existed until the administrative territorial reform of 2009.

== Sights ==
- Ruins of the Smiltene castle (14th century)
- the Smiltene Lutheran church
- Kalnamuiža (the Smiltene manor house)

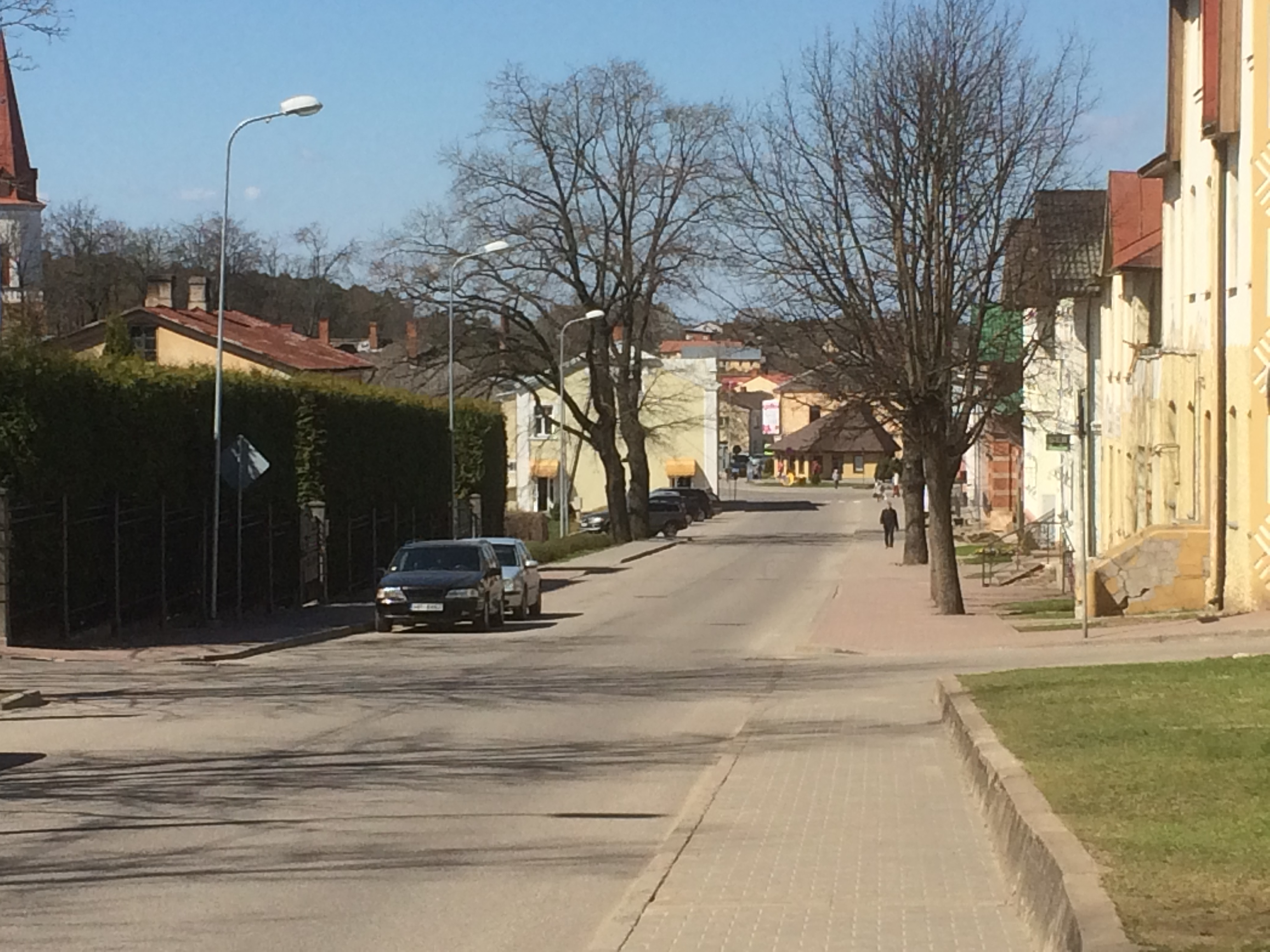

== Sports ==
The most popular sports among the Smiltene youth is football, the local club Abuls Smiltene however is not especially strong and is one of the outsiders of the Latvian First League. Since 1969 there is also an ice hockey team in Smiltene.

== Twin towns — sister cities ==
Smiltene is twinned with:

- Donnery, France
- Drohobych, Ukraine
- Lviv, Ukraine
- Novopolotsk, Belarus
- Pincara, Italy
- Písek, Czech Republic
- Pustomyty, Ukraine
- Rovigo, Italy
- Steinkjer, Norway
- Wiesenbach, Germany
- Willich, Germany

== Notable people ==
- Dzidra Uztupe-Karamiševa (1930–2014), basketball player, coach
- Dainis Deglis (born 1959), footballer who played over 350 games
- Dainis Ozols (born 1966), cyclist, bronze medallist in the 194 km road race at the 1992 Summer Olympics
- Einārs Tupurītis (born 1973), 800 metres runner
- Līna Mūze (born 1992), javelin throwing athlete, competed at the 2012, 2020 and 2024 Olympic Games
