= Ape Municipality =

Former municipality of Latvia

Coordinates: 57°28′N 26°37′E

Ape Municipality Apes novads
- Former municipality
- Coat of arms

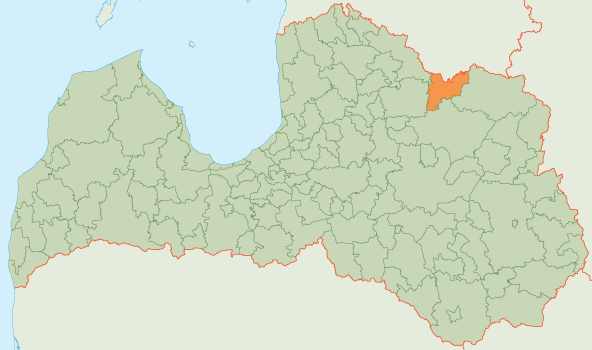
- Country: Latvia
- Formed: 2009
- Dissolved: 2021
- Centre: Ape, Latvia

Government
  - Council Chair (last): Jānis Liberts (We - For Our Municipality)

Area
  - Total: 545.07 km^{2} (210.45 sq mi)
  - Land: 534.19 km^{2} (206.25 sq mi)
  - Water: 10.88 km^{2} (4.20 sq mi)

Population (2021)
  - Total: 3,205
  - Density: 6.000/km^{2} (15.54/sq mi)
- Website: www.ape.lv

Ape Municipality (Latvian: Apes novads) was a municipality in Vidzeme, Latvia. The municipality was formed in 2009 by merging Gaujiena parish, Vireši parish, Trapene parish and Ape town with its countryside territory. The administrative centre was Ape. In 2010 Ape parish was created from the countryside territory of Ape town.

On 1 July 2021, Ape Municipality ceased to exist and its territory was merged into Smiltene Municipality.

== See also ==
- Administrative divisions of Latvia
