= Hoppenhof =

Hoppenhof can refer to:

- Hoppenhof, German name of Ape, Latvia
- Den Hoppenhof – former Michelin starred restaurant in Geldrop, The Netherlands
