= Zvārtava Manor =

Manor house in Latvia

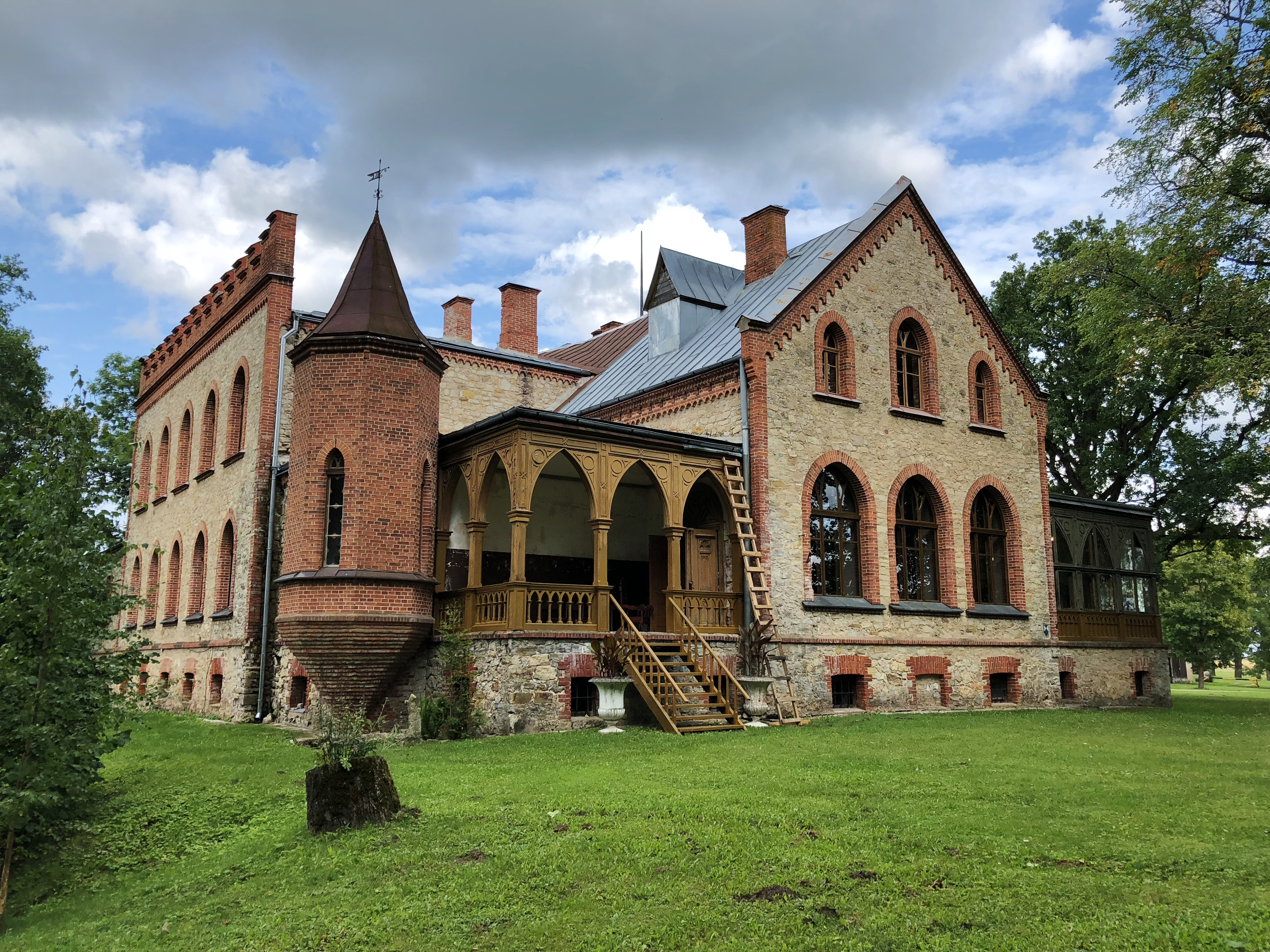

- Location within Latvia
- Interactive map of the Zvārtava Manor area

General information
- Architectural style: Manor house
- Location: Vidzeme, Latvia
- Coordinates: 57°32′14.38″N 26°22′7.26″E
- Completed: 1881

Design and construction
- Known for: Part of Gaujiena Castle until 1781

Zvārtava Manor (Latvian: Zvārtavas muižas pils; German: Adsel-Schwartzhof) is a manor house in Gaujiena Parish, Smiltene Municipality in the historical region of Vidzeme, northern Latvia. It was built in 1881 in Tudor Neo-Gothic style.

== History ==
The estate was first mentioned around 1405 under the name "Adsel-Schwarzhof". Until 1781, it was part of the Gaujiena Castle estate. The ownership of the manor changed several times in the 17th century. In the 18th century, the property belonged to the von Delvig family. From 1783 to 1825, it was property of the family of Magnus Johann Scotus (ennobled in 1788 in Vienna as Scotus von Scott) and his daughter Johanna (Jeanette). The manor was sold to Dr. Wilhelm Johann Engelbrecht von Zoeckell and later became the property of Luise von Zoeckell and her husband baronet Gottlieb von Fersen. The manor belonged to von Fersen family until World War I.

In 1922, the Guard House was established in the manor house. After World War II, there was a school (until 1969), the local collective farm used the castle cellars for warehouses. The manor house became the property of the Latvian Artists Union in 1970. It hosts international artists' seminars and exhibitions. A guest house has been set up.

The complex has a castle, a gardener's house, a barn, a windmill, stables with artists' workshops, and several outbuildings. The manor house was built in 1881 in neo-Gothic style. Boulder wall, two floors, steep gable roof. The text "Hic habitat Felicitas, nihil mali intret" is engraved on the stone on the threshold of the castle (from Latin: "Happiness lives here, nothing bad comes in").

== See also ==
- List of palaces and manor houses in Latvia
