= Gaujiena Parish =

Parish of Latvia

- parish of Latvia
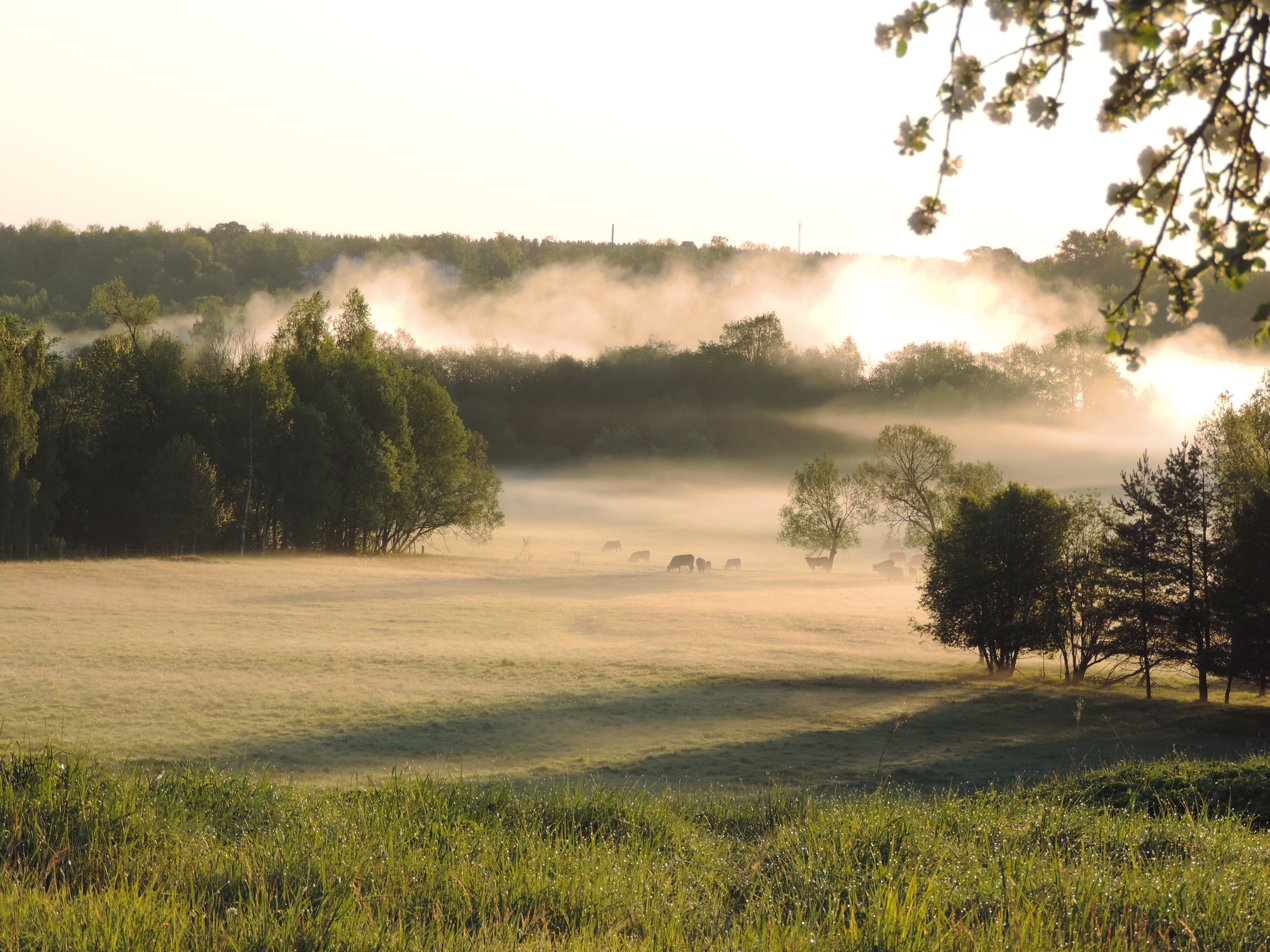

- Coat of arms

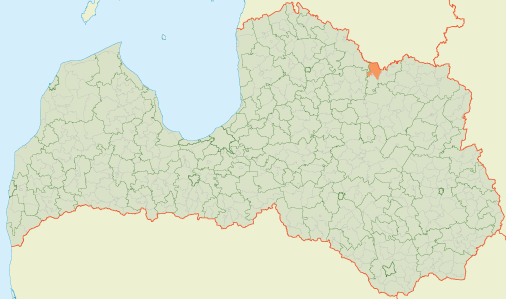
- 57°30′47″N 26°25′21″E
- Country: Latvia

Area
  - Total: 125.81 km^{2} (48.58 sq mi)
  - Land: 123.25 km^{2} (47.59 sq mi)
  - Water: 2.56 km^{2} (0.99 sq mi)

Population (1 January 2024)
  - Total: 745
  - Density: 5.9/km^{2} (15/sq mi)

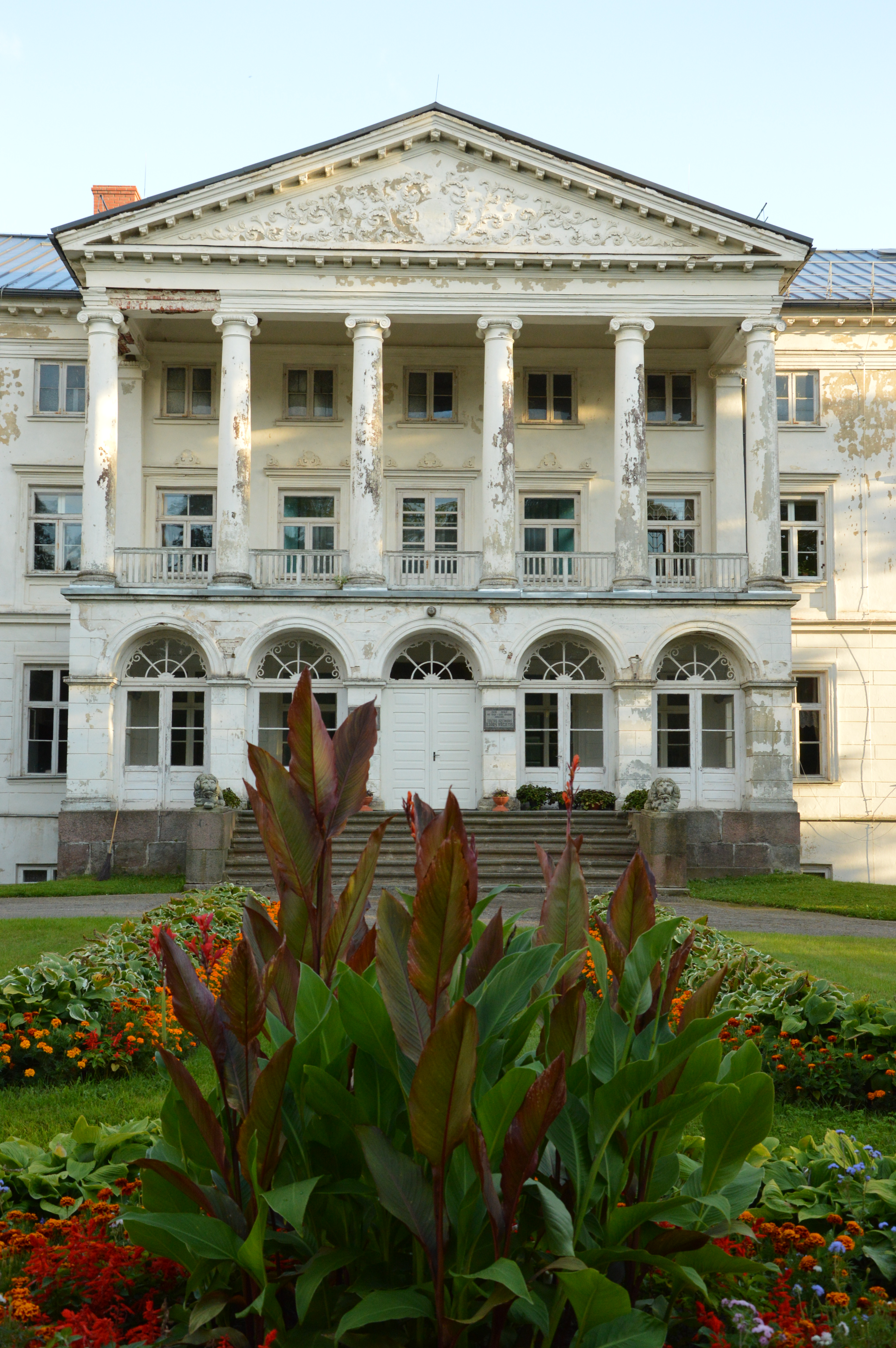
Gaujiena Palace

Gaujiena Parish (Latvian: Gaujienas pagasts) is an administrative unit of Smiltene Municipality, Latvia. The administrative center is the village of Gaujiena.

== Towns, villages and settlements of Gaujiena Parish ==
- Dārzciems
- Gaujiena
- Mežciems
- Zvārtava

== See also ==
- Gaujiena Castle
- Gaujiena Palace
- Zvārtava Manor
