= Trapene Manor =

Manor house in Latvia

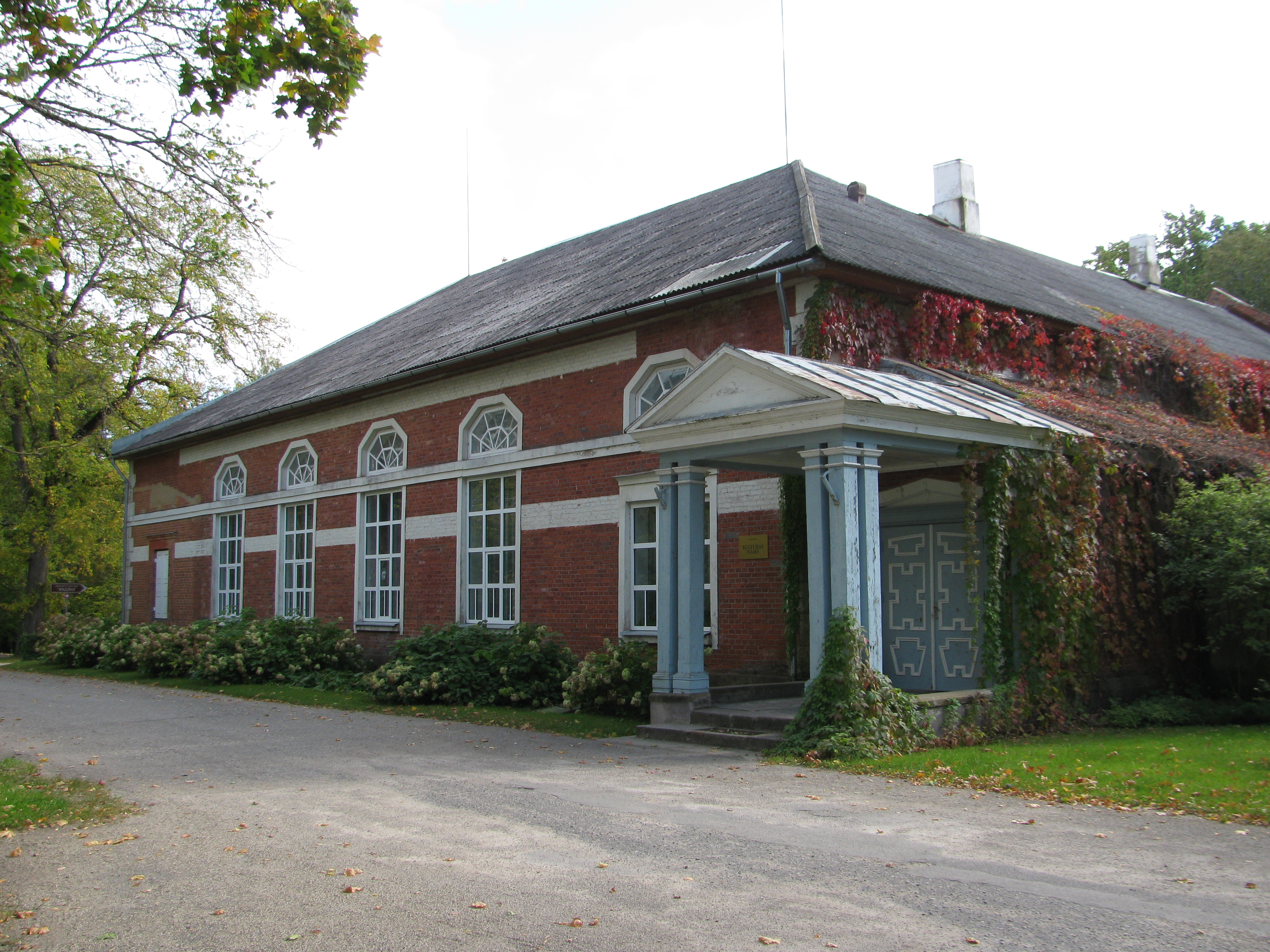

- Location within Latvia

General information
- Location: Trapene Parish, Smiltene Municipality, Vidzeme, “Bormaņi”, Trapenes pagasts, Smiltenes novads, LV–4348, Latvia
- Coordinates: 57°26′58″N 26°35′41″E
- Completed: 1890
- Client: Baron von Wolff

Trapene Manor, formerly named Bormaņi Manor, is a manor house in Trapene Parish, Smiltene Municipality in the historical region of Vidzeme, in northern Latvia.

== History ==
Originally built at the beginning of the 19th century, its red brick outer walls were added around 1890. In 1917, during World War I and the onset of civil war in Russia, the property was abandoned by its owner Baron Voldemar von Wolff and started to quickly deteriorate. The head of a local school —and also musician— Eižens Vēveris envisioned using the abandoned house for artistic activities and convinced the local authorities to save the property. The building currently houses the Trapene parish cultural center and library.

== See also ==
- List of palaces and manor houses in Latvia
