= Ojārs Vācietis =

Latvian writer and poet

- Born: November 13, 1933; Trapene Parish, Latvia (now Smiltene Municipality)
- Died: 28 November 1983 (aged 50); Rīga, Latvian SSR, Soviet Union
- Occupations: poet, writer
- Spouse: Ludmila Azarova
- Writing career
- Genre: Poetry

Ojārs Vācietis (born November 13, 1933 – November 28, 1983) was a Latvian writer and poet. He is often considered one of the most famous and influential poets in the Latvian SSR.

== Biography ==
Ojārs Vācietis was born on November 13, 1933, in Trapene Parish, Latvia. His father Oto Vācietis was a servant. Vācietis studied in Trapane primary school and later in Gaujiena secondary school. 1952 he started Latvian language and literature studies at the University of Latvia. He graduated in 1957. Since 1958 he worked in several Latvian magazines and newspapers (for example: Literatūra un Māksla, Liesma, Draugs). He was also an editor at the Riga Film Studio. In the 1960s he started to question many official ideological dogmas of the Soviet regime in his poems. As a result, he was not allowed to publish from 1960–1966. Some of his works from this period were published for the first time only during the Singing Revolution. However, he was awarded the Latvian SSR State prize in 1967.

He also translated many works from Russian into Latvian. His most famous and still very highly acclaimed translation was Mikhail Bulgakov's The Master and Margarita in 1979. He was declared People's writer of Latvian SSR in 1977. Vācietis was married to the Russian poet Ludmila Azarova and their house in Riga, Torņakalns neighborhood has now been transformed into a memorial museum.

Ojārs Vācietis died on November 28, 1983, in Riga. He was buried in Carnikava cemetery.

== Notable works ==
- Tālu ceļu vējš (1956)
- Sasiesim astes (1967)
- punktiņš punktiņš komatiņš (1971)
- Kabata (1976)
- Si minors (1982)
- Astoņi kustoņi (1984)
- Sveču grāmata (1988)
