= Gaujiena =

Village in Latvia

- Village
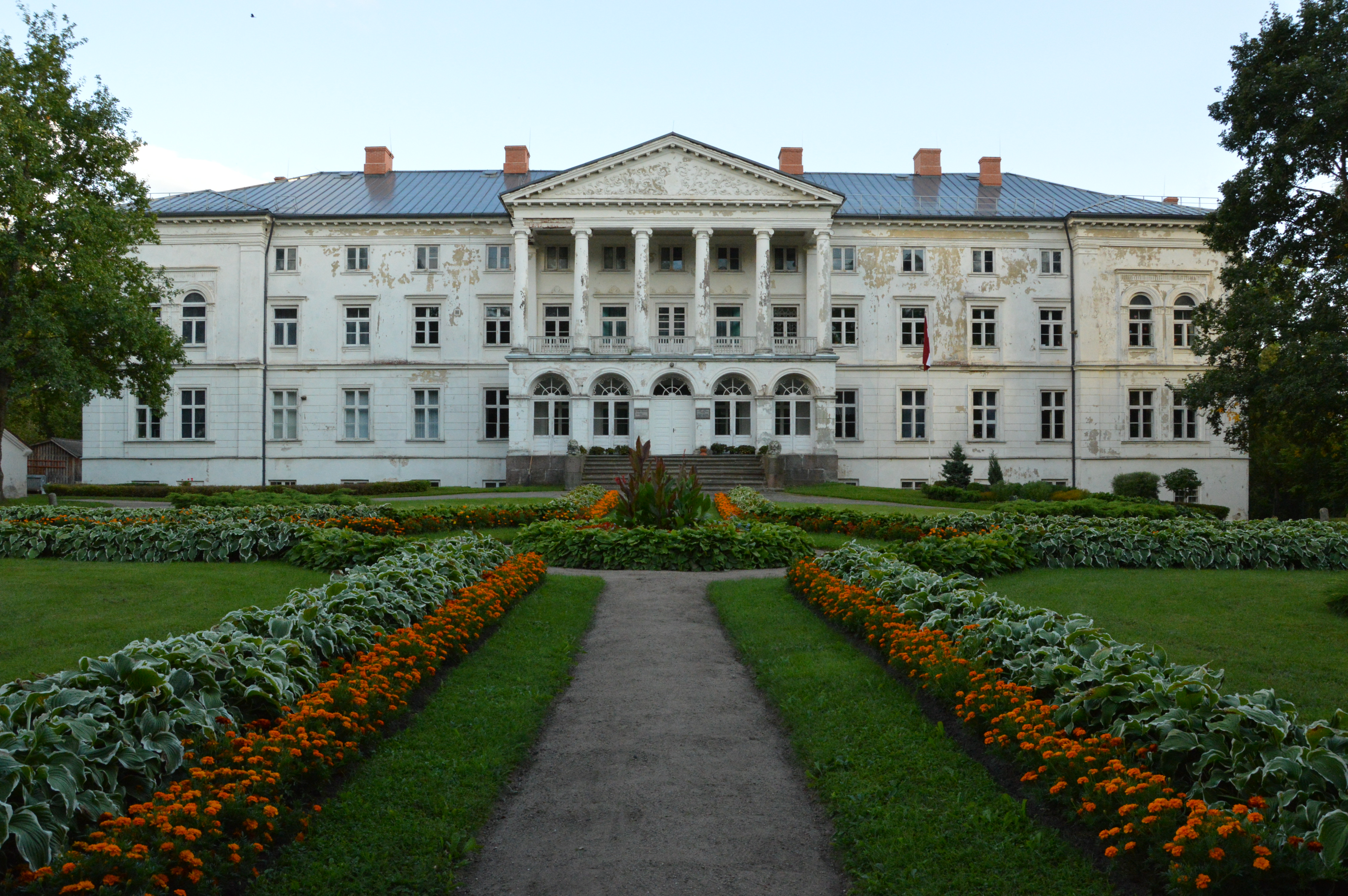
- Gaujiena Manor

- Gaujiena's location in Latvia
- Country: Latvia
- Municipality: Smiltene
- Parish: Gaujiena

Area
  - Total: 55 sq mi (143 km^{2})

Population (2021)
  - Total: 501
- Postal code: LV-4339

Gaujiena (German: Adsel) is a village along the Gauja River in the Gaujiena Parish of Smiltene Municipality in the Vidzeme region of Latvia. It was the seat of a Komtur of the Teutonic Knights. The Gaujiena Castle was erected in the 13th century, but fell into disrepair in the 18th century.

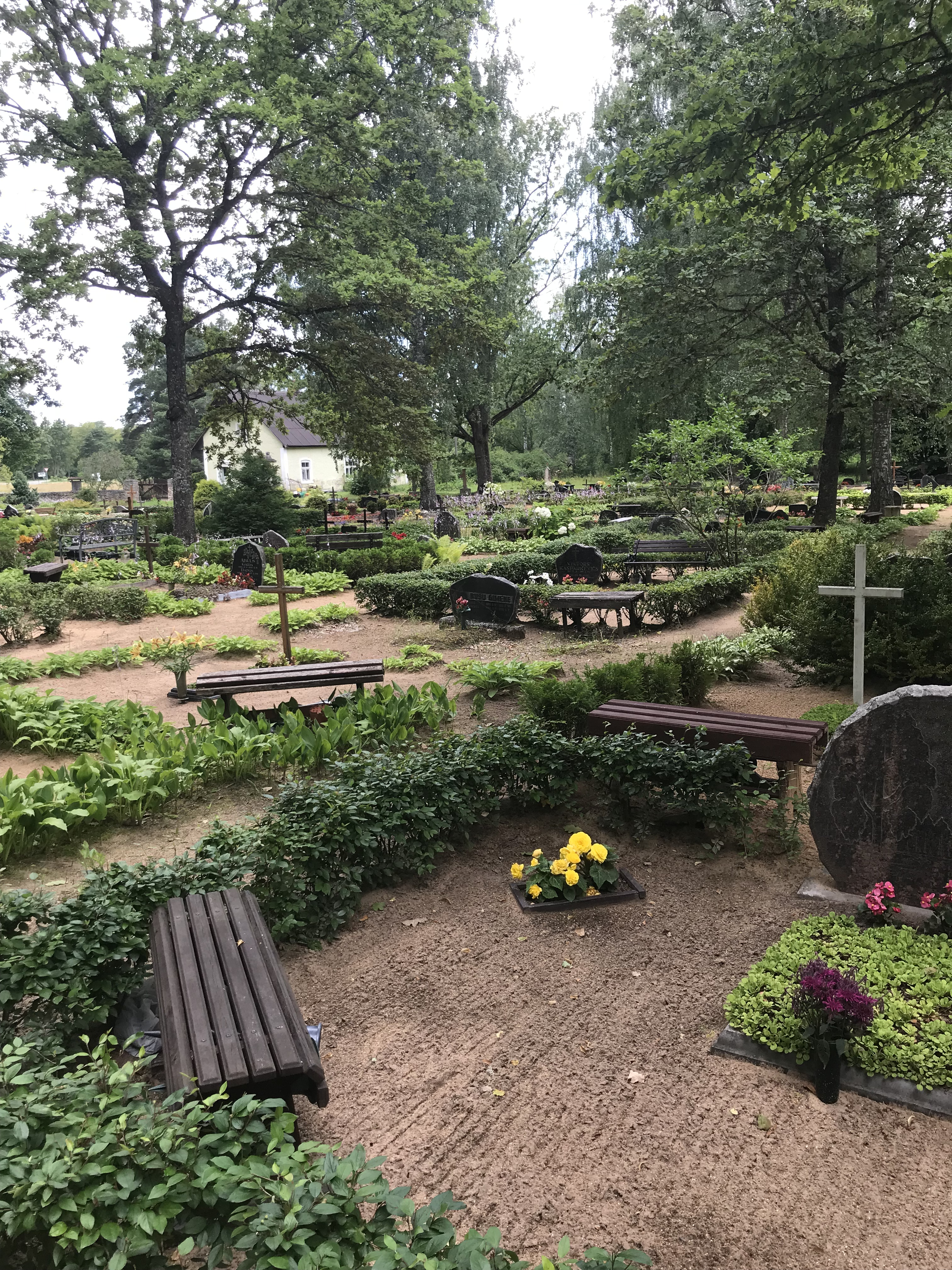

== Gallery ==
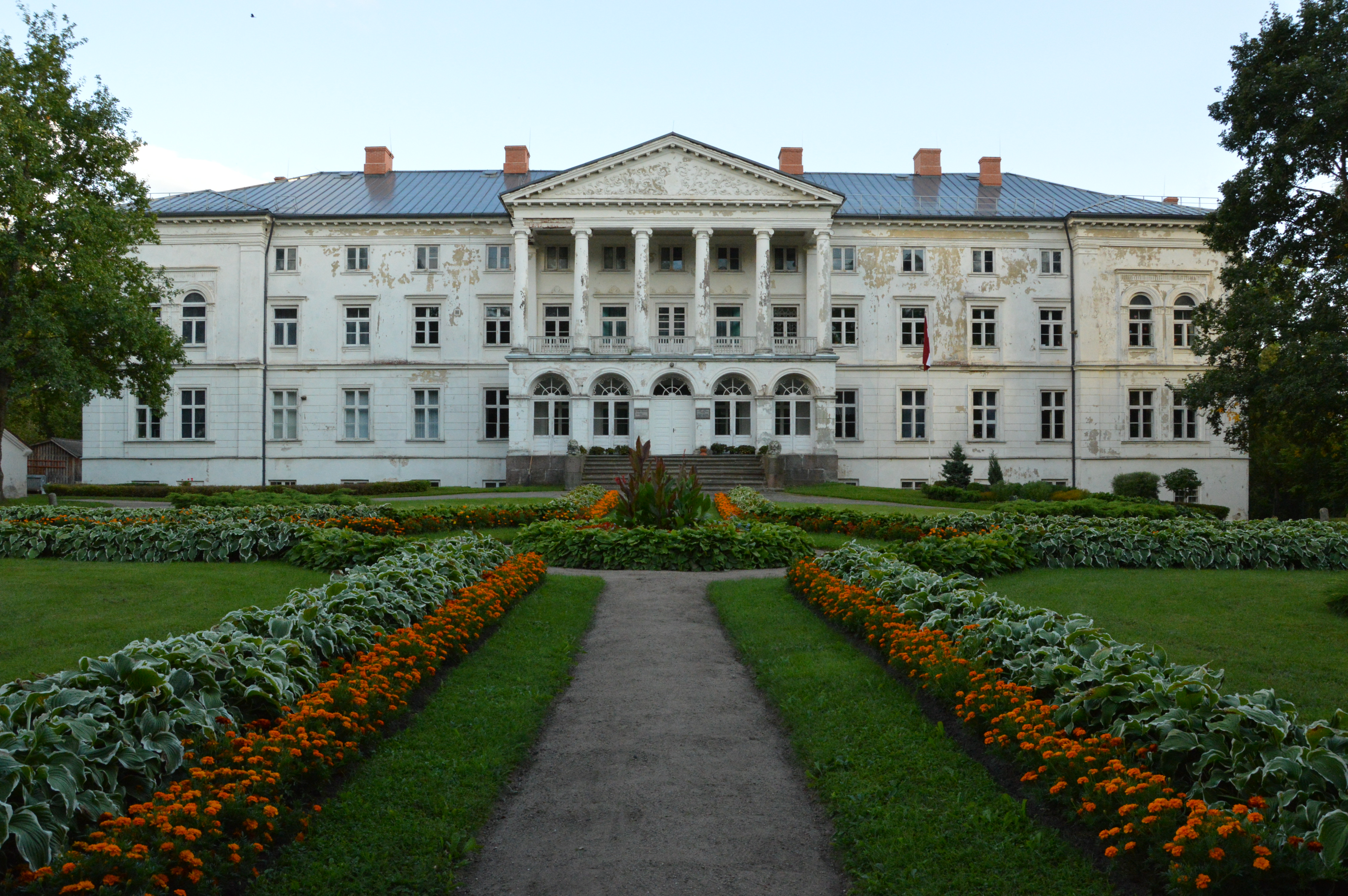
Gaujiena Palace

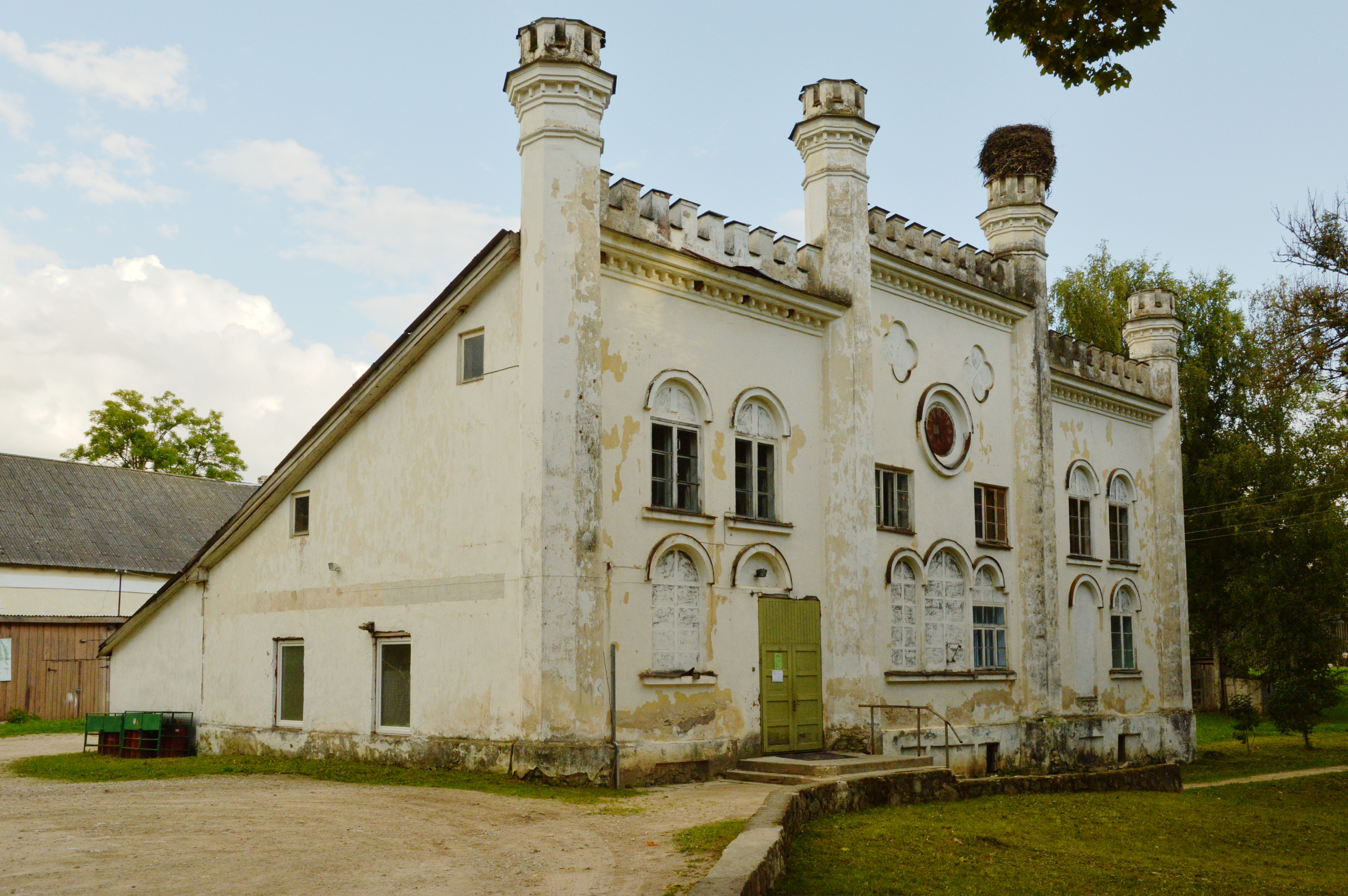

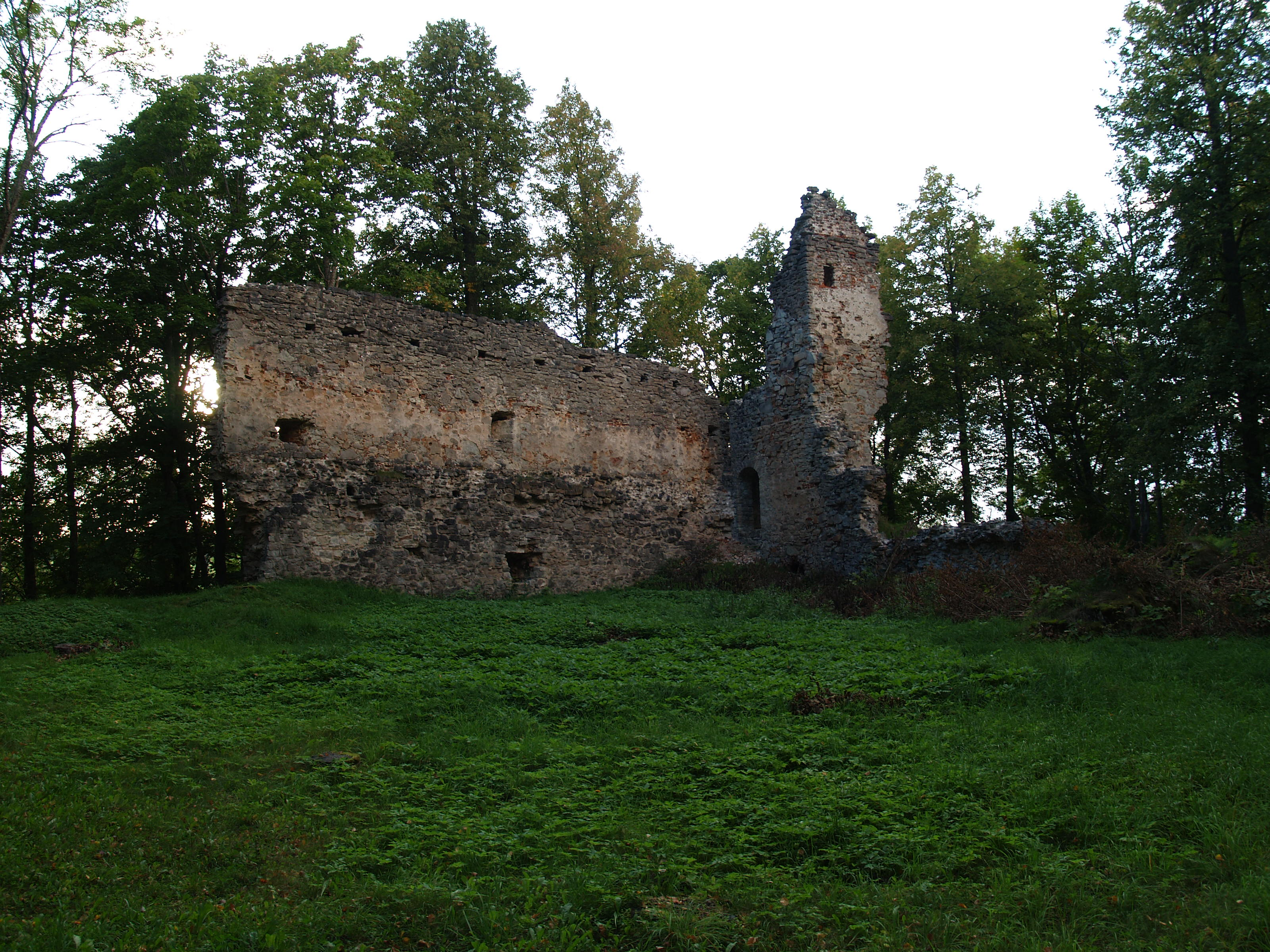
Gaujiena Castle ruins

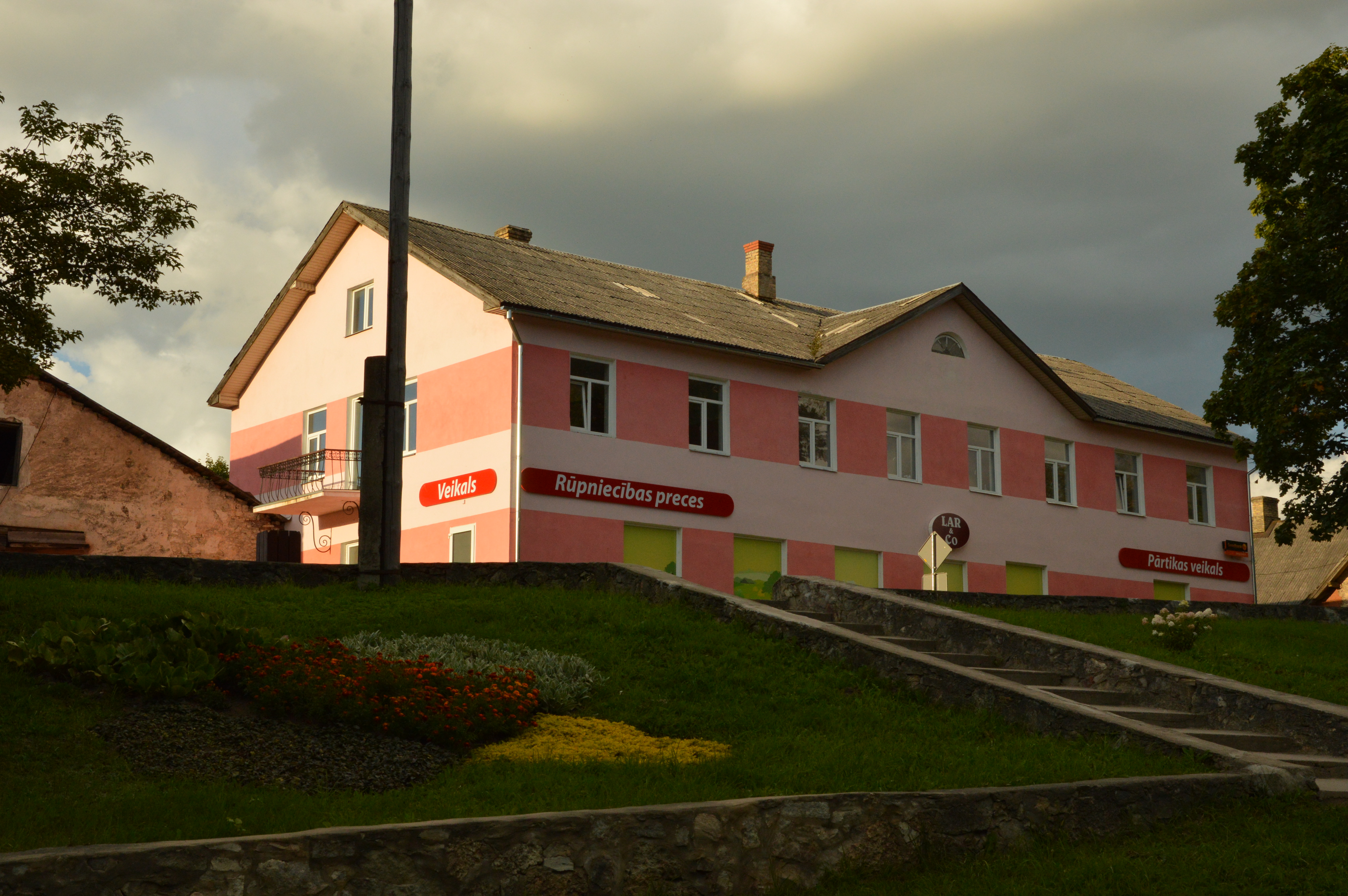
Shop
