= Varini (disambiguation) =

Varini can refer to:

- The Warini, a barbarian tribe of Late Antiquity
- Variņi parish, a parish in Latvia
- Felice Varini, Swiss artist
