= Ape, Latvia =

Town in Smiltene Municipality, Latvia

Ape
- Town
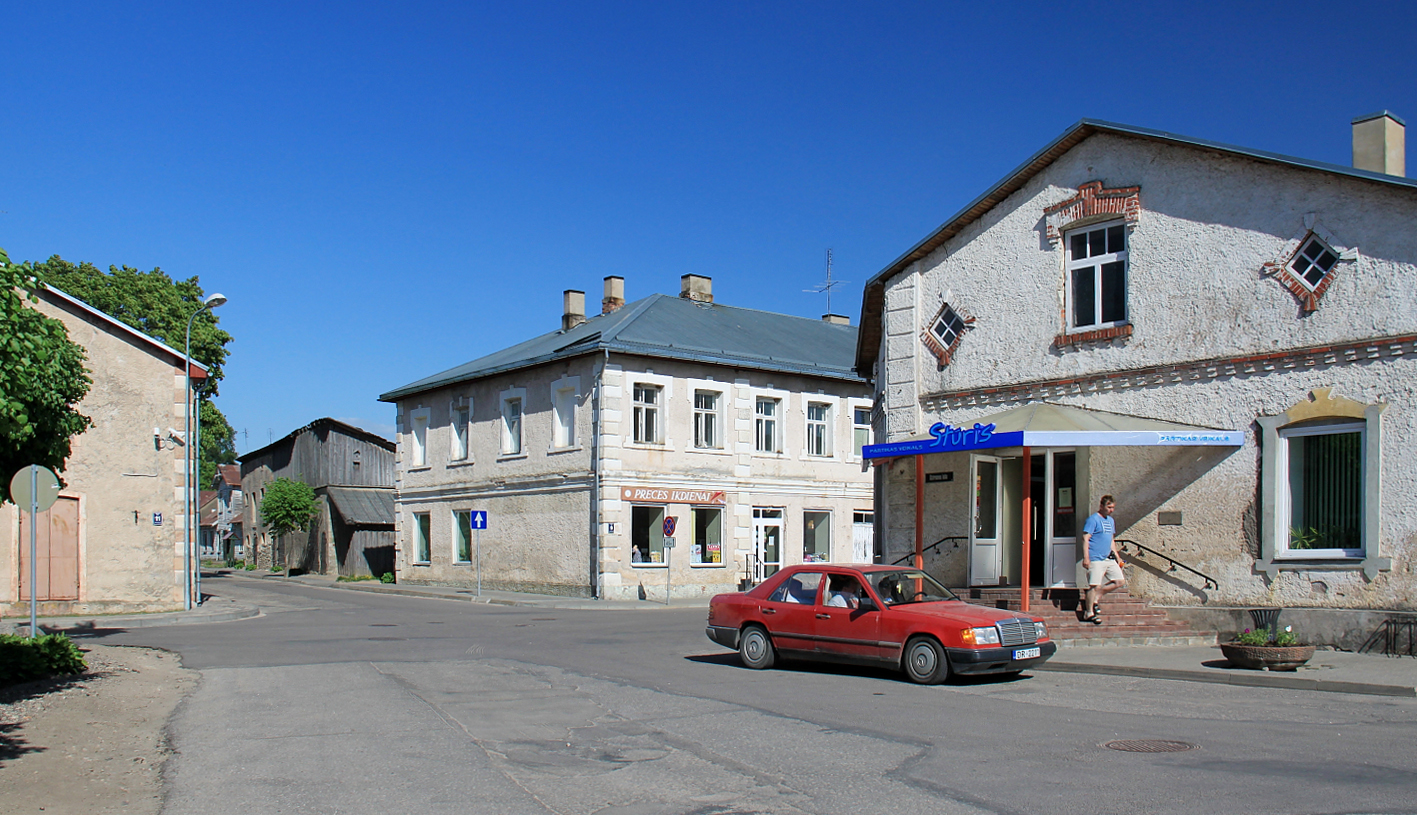

- Coat of arms

- Location in Latvia
- Coordinates: 57°32′21″N 26°41′34″E
- Country: Latvia
- Municipality: Smiltene Municipality
- Town rights: 1928

Government
  - Mayor: Astrīda Harju

Area
  - Total: 2.45 km^{2} (0.95 sq mi)
  - Land: 2.39 km^{2} (0.92 sq mi)
  - Water: 0.06 km^{2} (0.023 sq mi)

Population (2026)
  - Total: 753
  - Density: 315/km^{2} (816/sq mi)
- Time zone: UTC+2 (EET)
  - Summer (DST): UTC+3 (EEST)
- Postal code: LV-4337
- Calling code: +371 643
- Number of city council members: 7
- Website: www.ape.lv/eng.htm

Ape (Estonian: Hopa, German: Hoppenhof) is a town in Smiltene Municipality in the Vidzeme region of Latvia located near the border with Estonia.

The town is also the extra-territorial centre of Ape Parish.

Ape gained city rights in 1928. From 2009 to 2021, it was the centre of Ape Municipality.

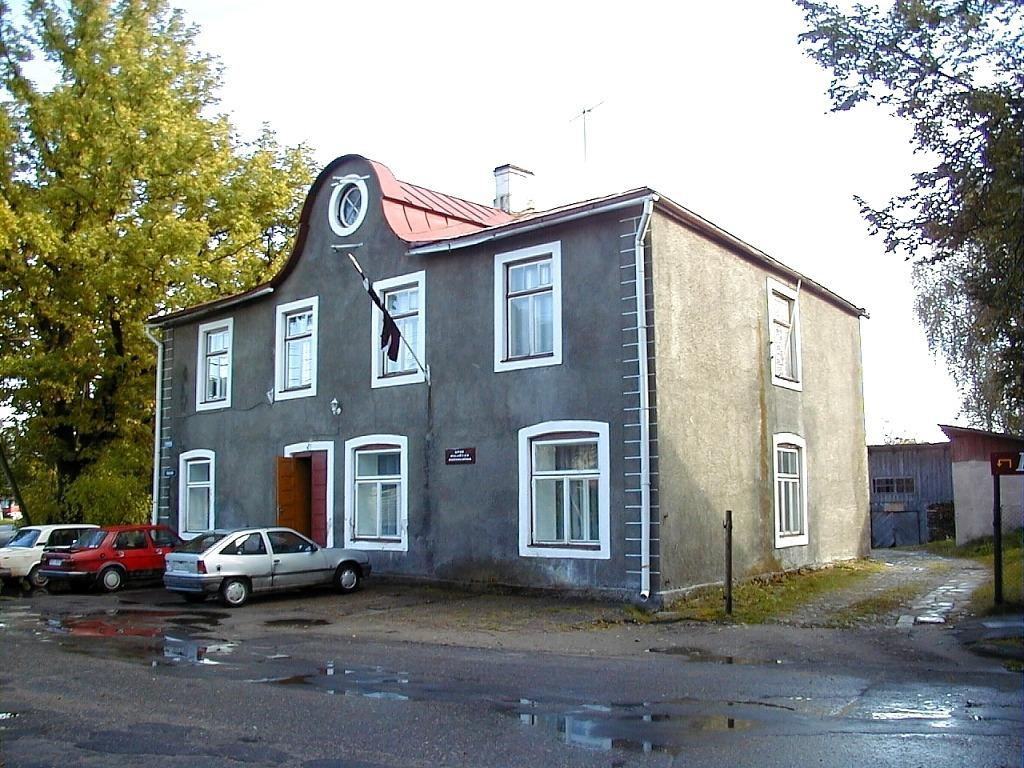
The local government of Ape municipality.

== Notable people ==
- Andris Šķēle, a Latvian businessman and former politician, ⁣who previously served as a Prime Minister of Latvia.

== See also ==
- List of cities and towns in Latvia
