= Grundzāle Parish =

Parish of Latvia

- parish of Latvia
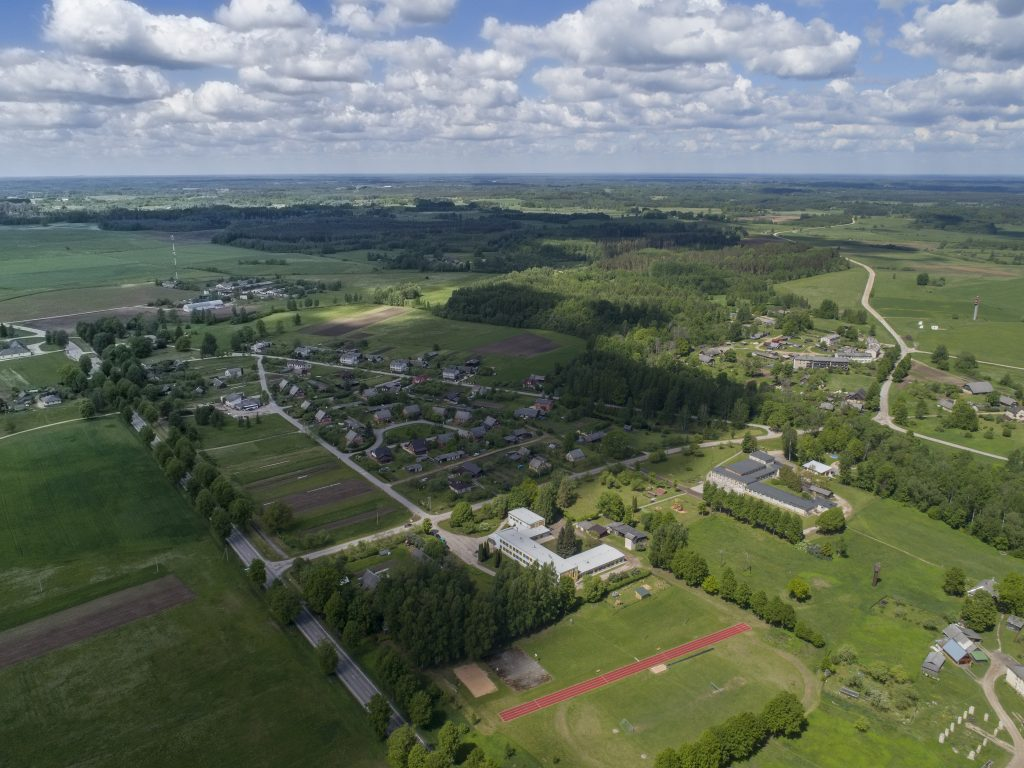

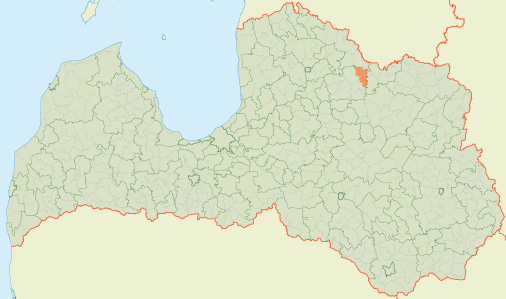
- Coordinates: 57°28′14″N 26°14′04″E
- Country: Latvia

Population (1 January 2026)
  - Total: 714

Grundzāle Parish (Latvian: Grundzāles pagasts) is an administrative unit of Smiltene Municipality in the Vidzeme region of Latvia
