= Gaujiena Palace =

Castle in Latvia

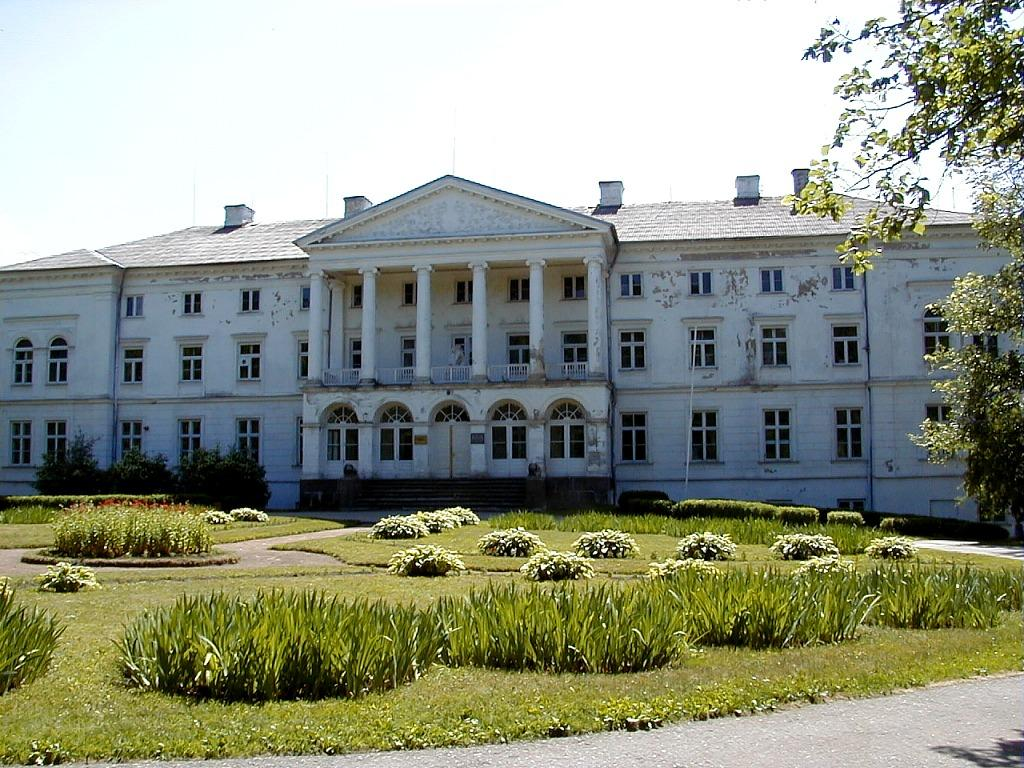
- Gaujiena Palace in 1999

- Location within Latvia

General information
- Location: Gaujiena, Vidzeme, Latvia
- Coordinates: 57°30′51″N 26°23′51″E
- Construction started: 1850.

Gaujiena Palace (Latvian: Gaujienas muižas pils, German: Schloss Adsel) is a palace in Smiltene Municipality, in the Vidzeme region of Latvia.

== History ==
It was built between 1850 and 1860 in late Classical style. The six-column portico was added later. Since 1922 the palace has housed the Gaujiena comprehensive secondary school (Gaujienas ģimnāzija).

== See also ==
- Gaujiena Castle
- List of palaces and manor houses in Latvia
