= Ape Parish =

Parish of Latvia

- parish of Latvia
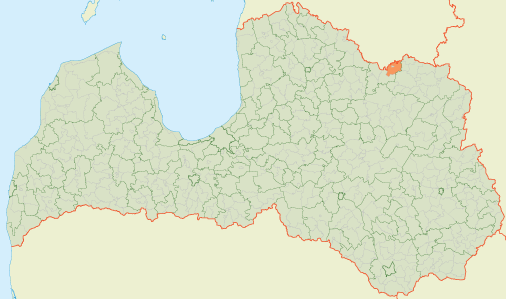
- 57°31′25″N 26°43′24″E
- Country: Latvia

Area
  - Total: 125.15 km^{2} (48.32 sq mi)
  - Land: 123.05 km^{2} (47.51 sq mi)
  - Water: 2.1 km^{2} (0.8 sq mi)

Population (1 January 2024)
  - Total: 401
  - Density: 3.2/km^{2} (8.3/sq mi)

Ape Parish (Latvian: Apes pagasts) is an administrative unit of Smiltene Municipality, Latvia. It was created in 2010 from the countryside territory of Ape town. At the beginning of 2014, the population of the parish was 542.

== Towns, villages and settlements of Ape parish ==
- Dauškāni
- Grūbe
- Uskani
