= Wolfgang Maria Ohlhäuser =

German painter

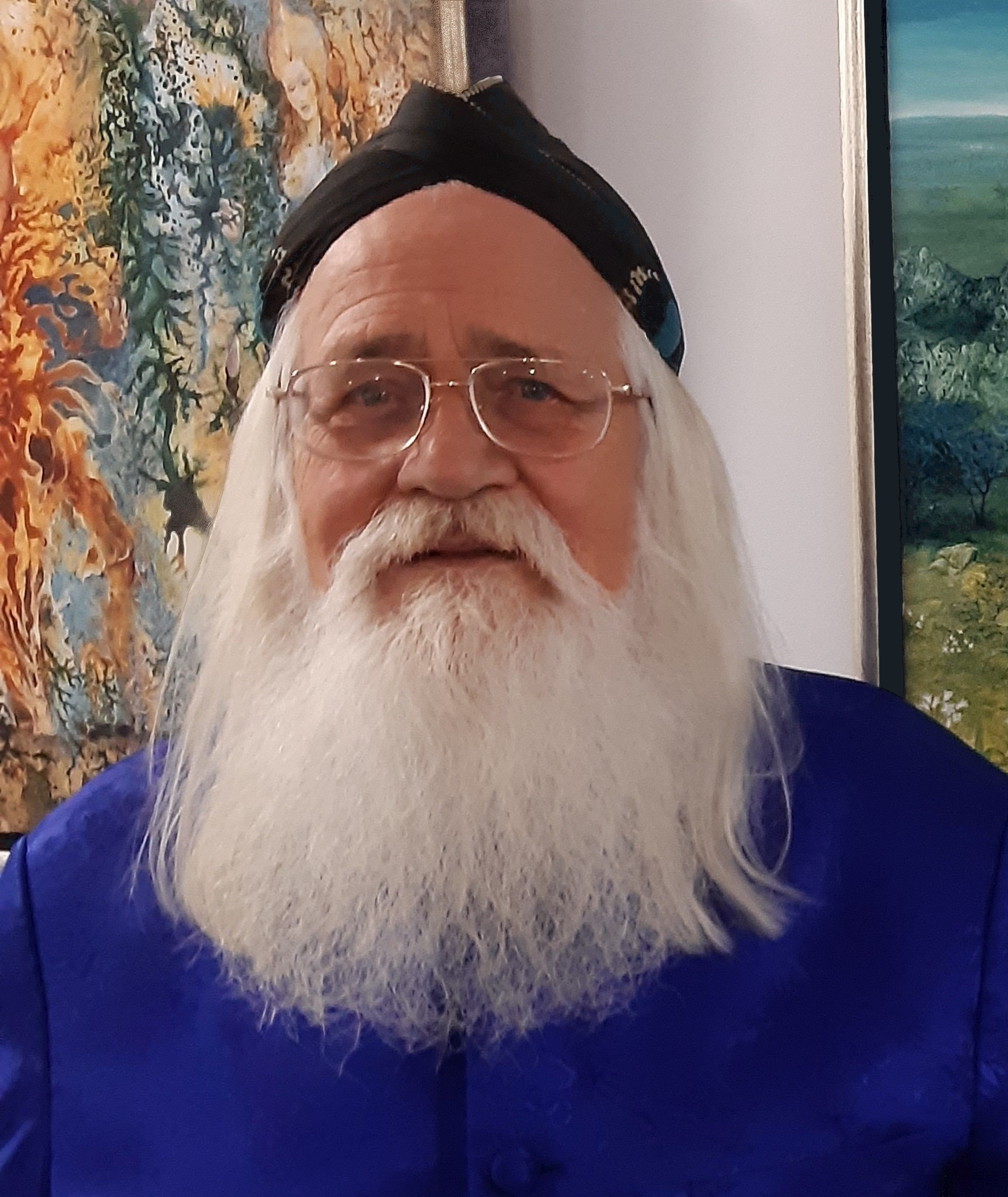
Wolfgang Maria Ohlhäuser 2019

Wolfgang Maria Ohlhäuser (born 6 December 1941 in Stuttgart-Bad Cannstatt) is a German painter.

== Life and work ==
Wolfgang Ohlhäuser is a son of the sculptor Walter Ohlhäuser and his wife Helene (née Deichmann).

From 1956 to 1959 he trained as a graphic artist. In 1967 he became a freelance graphic artist in Mannheim. Since 1973 he lived in the Heidelberg area. In 1975 he began as an art painter and specialized in the old-master painting techniques resin oil glaze and egg tempera. At the UNESO-Sopot-Gdansk Festival of Fine Artists in 1978, Ohlhäuser received the bronze medal. In 1982 he received a scholarship from the Kunststiftung Baden-Württemberg. Since 1993 until 2020, he has had teaching assignments every year, some several times, at art academies and universities in Nepal and Thailand, such as Tribuhvan University in Kathmandu-Nepal, the College of Fine Arts in Ladkrabang-Bangkok and the Department of Fine Arts in Phuttamonthon-Bangkok.

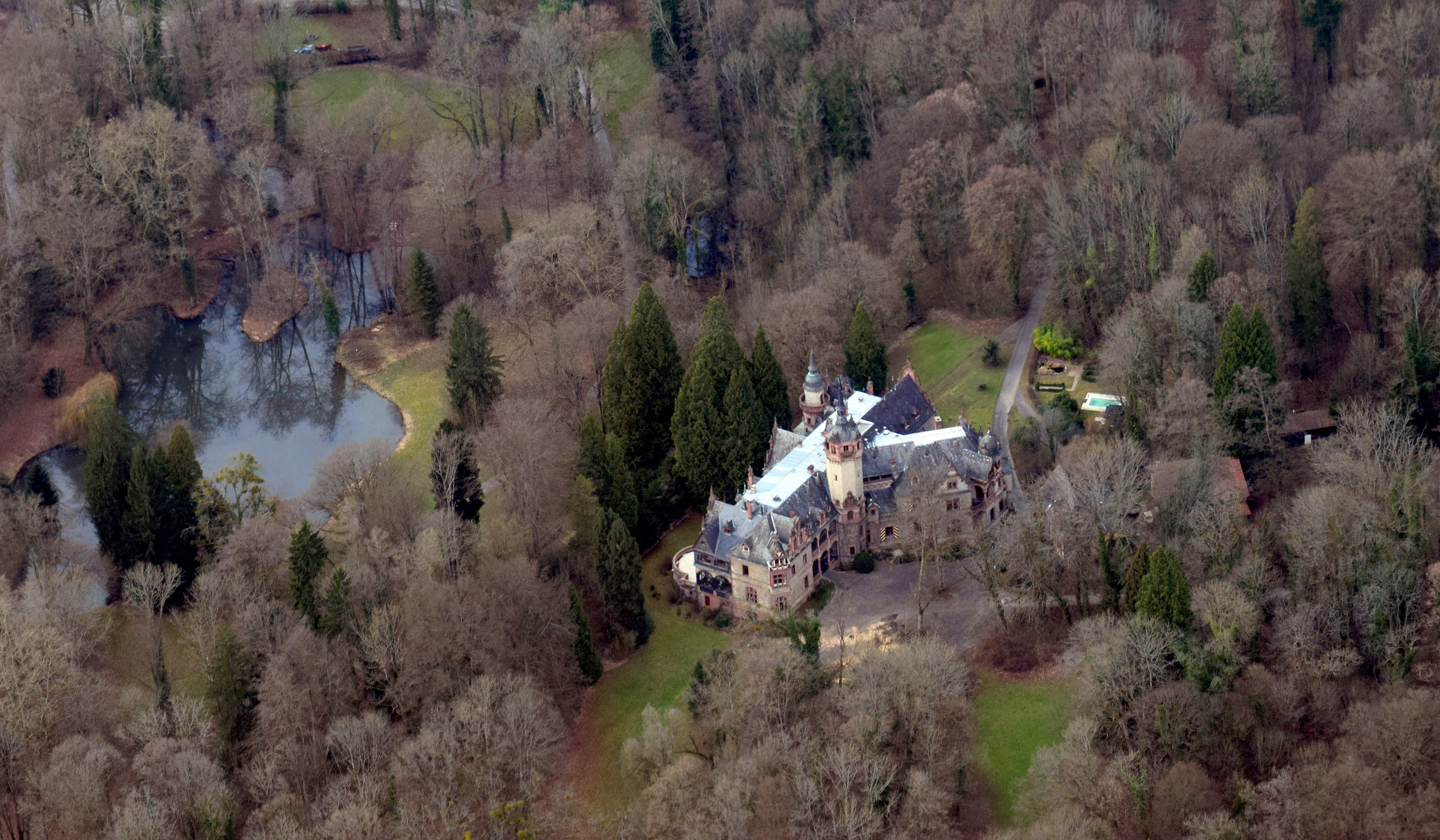
Castle Langenzell in Wiesenbach

From 1987 to 2010 he lived in the Castle Langenzell. He had his Atelier on an upper floor and could use rooms for art exhibitions downstairs. In 2010, he decided to move to Weinheim on the Badische Bergstrasse.

Regular trips took him to Nepal and Tibet, where he made extensive mountain hikes, and to Thailand, where he often spent many months. After his respective return to Langenzell, he immersed himself in painting the landscapes seen on the trips and the people living in them.

== Paintings ==
Almost all of his paintings are privately owned or owned by museums, academies, universities and embassies, or owned by the state of Baden-Württemberg, the cities of Karlsruhe, Stuttgart, Mannheim, Bangkok, the Kunsthalle Mannheim, Goethe-Institut Kathmandu (Nepal), Gallery Ban-Phuan-Bankabi (Thailand), Museum College of Fine Arts (Suphanburi, Thailand), Ministry of Science and Art (Stuttgart), Employment Office (Heidelberg), Regional Councils in Tübingen, Stuttgart, Karlsruhe, Embassy of the Kingdom of Thailand (Bonn), Cultural Office of the City of Heidelberg and Cultural Office Rhein-Neckar-Kreis.

Reverence for nature, a special relationship between nature and man, the naturalistic and the visionary, magic realism and surrealism, and a delicate rendering of details in large paintings combine in his artworks.

"The works of Wolfgang Maria Ohlhäuser lead to the essence and the essence of nature - reflect the visible, let the invisible guess. With the painting art of old masters he dared already for 50 years the jump into the surreal - merges this with the real, creates new reality. Wolfgang Maria Ohlhäuser is also a bridge builder between these - perhaps also between foreign worlds, as well as between the Western, which is foreign to the Eastern. He is a role model for many artists around the region of the Himalayas, the "place of snow", and he has trained many in academies and colleges there.

In a ... time, in which the gift of creation - "Mother Nature" - ... is fragmented and dismembered, Wolfgang Maria Ohlhäuser creates with his landscapes places that become paradises of the soul and senses for us." (Quote: Sabine Theis-Krömer, Rupert Krömer)

== Exhibitions ==
Since 1969 there have been numerous solo and group exhibitions in Germany, Switzerland, France, Italy, Lebanon, Jordan, Syria, then in Thailand, Singapore, Yogyakarta Indonesia, in Kathmandu Nepal and further in many German cities and cultural centers. His first solo exhibition in 1969 was in Mannheim. In the following decades, his paintings were shown every year at several exhibitions, of which only a selection is mentioned here:

- 1986 „Pfälzische Phantasten: Wege der Kunst nach Hieronymus Bosch“ at the Art Society Landau.
- 2006 „Meister der Zwischen- und Seelenwelten. Werke der Ars phantastica“, Art Society Landau.
- 2006 Exhibition „Andere Wirklichkeiten“, Kunstverein Buchen.
- 2009 Exhibition „Der Tiger trifft den Jaguar“ at the Shamans Congress in Nepal-Dhulikhel.
- 2011 Exhibition „Wanderer ferner Welten“, Villa Meixner, Brühl/Baden.
- Juli 2011 in the Galery „KunstMaßnahmen“ in Heidelberg.
- 2013 „Art imaginär 2013“, Herrenhof Mußbach, Neustadt an der Weinstrasse
- 2016 Exhibition „Wanderer of distant worlds" on the occasion of his 75th birthday, in Ladenburg.

His last vernissage was on November 24, 2019, at the Hector Sport-Centrum in Weinheim. The exhibition planned for 2020 in Schwetzingen had to be cancelled due to the COVID-19 pandemic in Germany and was postponed in planning until 2021.
