= Alūksne Castle =

Castle in Latvia

- Vidzeme, Latvia
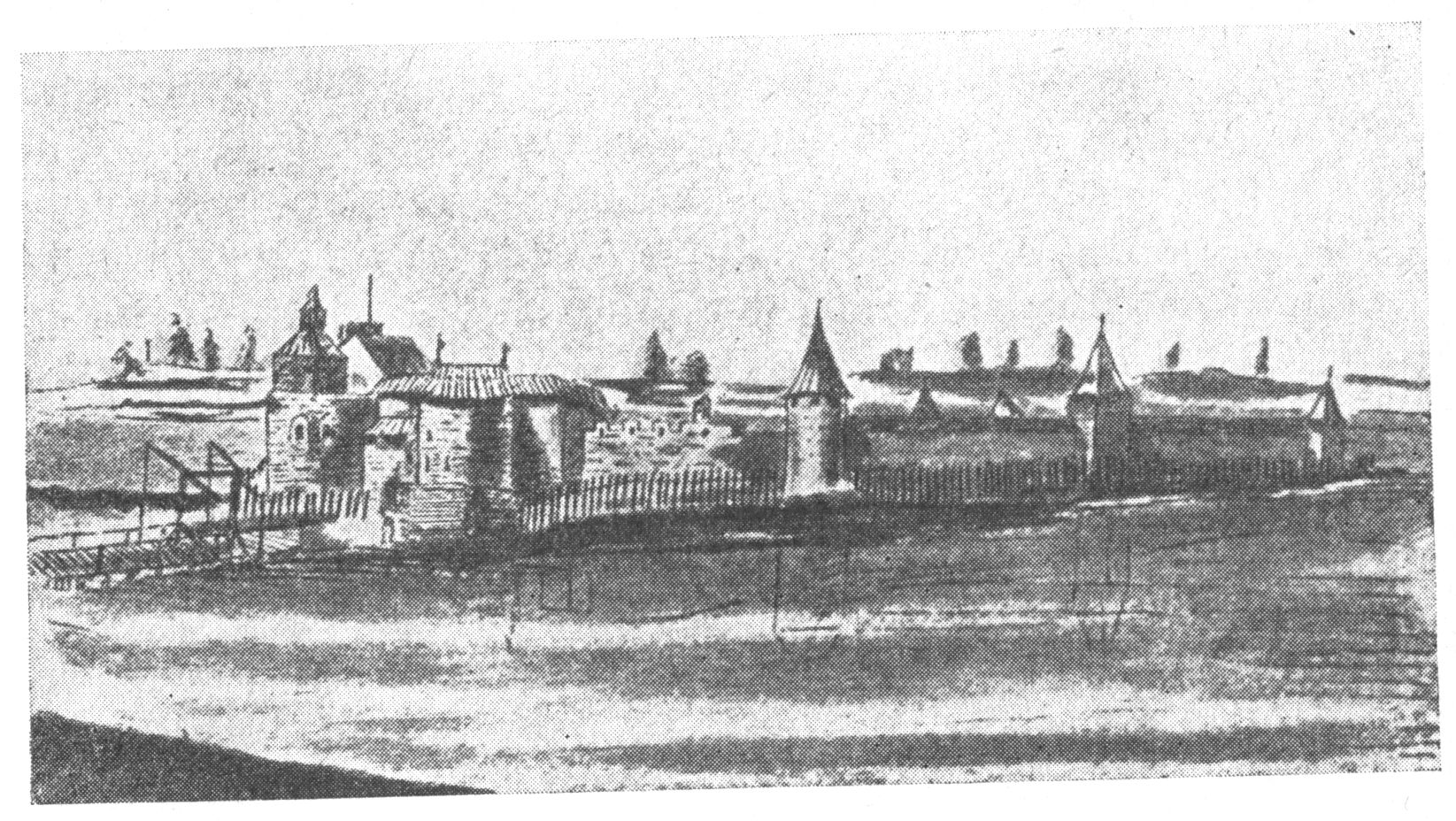
- Alūksne Castle in 1661 from the North-West

Site information
- Type: Castle
- Open to the public: yes

Location
- Location within Latvia
- Coordinates: 57°25′45″N 27°03′08″E

Site history
- Built: 1342
- Built by: Livonian Order
- Demolished: 1702 (blown up)
- Battles/wars: 1702 Siege of Alūksne

Alūksne Castle (Latvian: Alūksnes viduslaiku pils, Marienburgas pils; Swedish: Marienborg; German: Marienburg) is a castle of Teutonic Knights in Alūksne, Latvia.

== History ==
The castle was built by the Livonian order, the Eastern Baltic branch of the Teutonic order. After Gaujiena castle, the seat of the local Teutonic commandery, proved unable to defend the region from a series of Pskovan raids in 1341, the commandery was transferred to Alūksne. The Chronicle of Hermann von Wartberge gives the construction date as the Annunciation day of 1342, which it shares with Vastseliina castle in present-day Estonia. The German name of the castle, "Marienburg" is shared with the Teutonic Grand Master's castle in Malbork and is believed to derive from the connection of the castle to the Annunciation of Mary.

In 1560, during the Livonian War, Alūksne was besieged by the troops of Ivan VI the Terrible. The Russow Chronicle claims that the commander Caspar Sieborg surrendered the castle to Russian troops, who remained in charge of it until Alūksne was incorporated into the Polish–Lithuanian Commonwealth in 1582. Having changed owners several times during the Polish-Swedish Wars between 1601 and 1629 Alūksne became part of the Swedish Empire. The town and its castle were given as a fief to its conqueror Gustaf Horn, who was given the title of Baron of Marienburg. During the 1650s, the castle was briefly held by Russian forces.

At the start of Great Northern War, the castle in Alūksne underwent repairs but was left with a small garrison under command of Florian Thilo von Thilau. After a prolonged siege by the forces of Boris Sheremetev, a number of soldiers of the castle mutinied and set fire to its gunpowder stores. The castle has been in ruin since.

During the Soviet era, an open-air stage was constructed in the southern bailey of the castle, without waiting for archaeological work to start.

== Architecture ==
The initial castle was built of wood. Later, the outer walls were constructed of fieldstone and the convent house of bricks. The plan is in many ways similar to that of Viljandi Castle, including the convent building with a flanking tower. The outer wall originates partly from the same time as the convent house, partly from later periods, notably from the time of the political tensions in the early 16th century. The main gate, protected by two round towers, is also of late medieval origin.

Later, at the end of the 17th century, the castle was supplied with ravelines and ramparts.

== Gallery ==
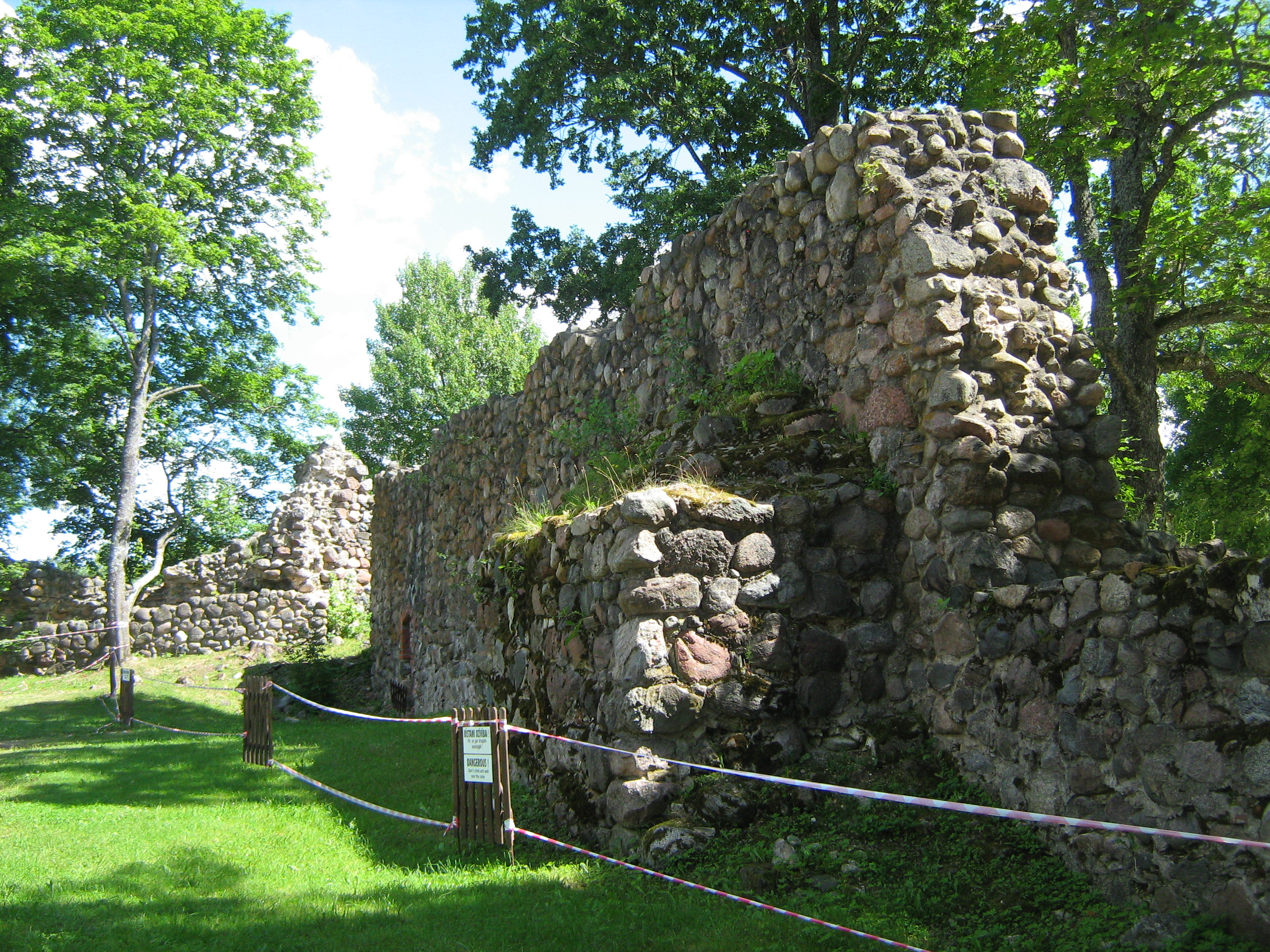
The walls from inside, 2010.

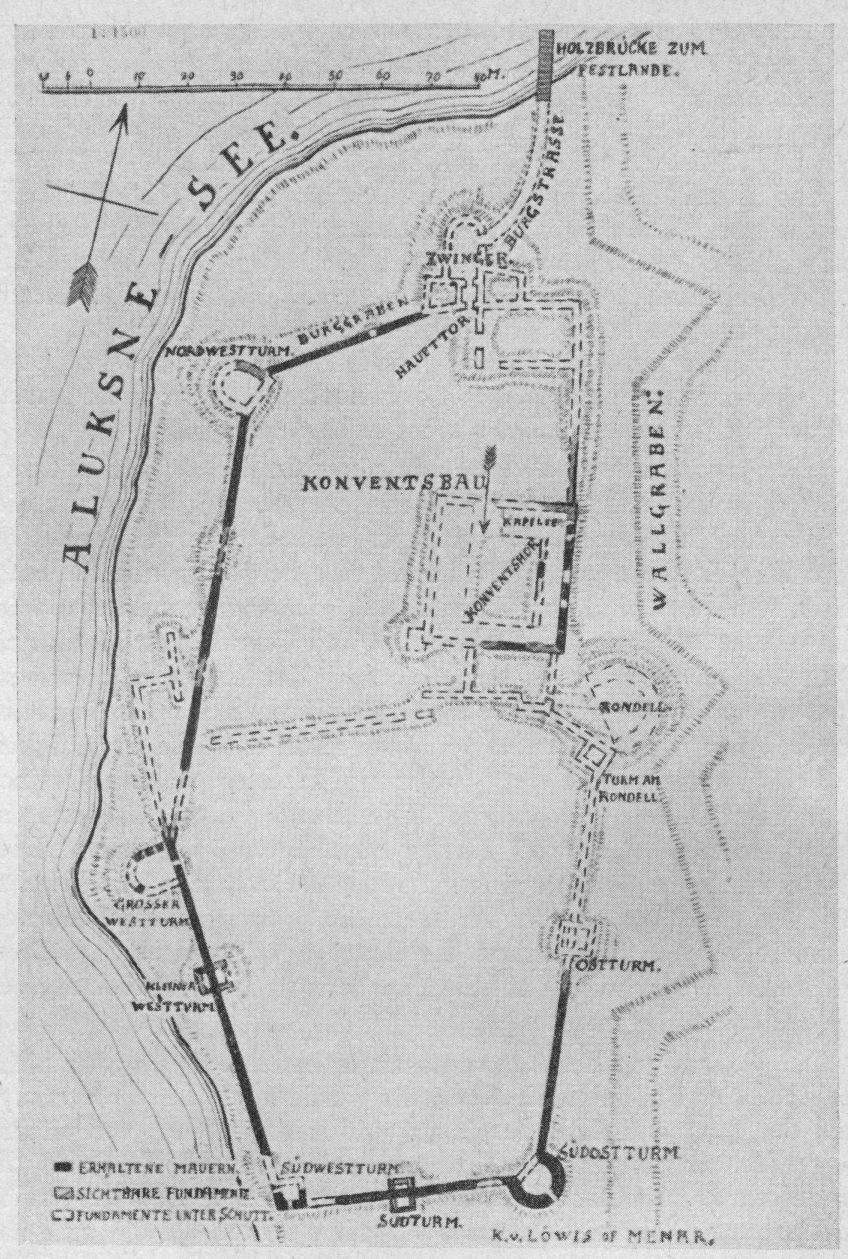
Plan of the castle according to Karl von Lövis of Menar.
