= Den Hoppenhof =

Restaurant information
- Rating: Michelin Guide
- Location: Stationstraat 25, Geldrop, Netherlands
- Other information: restaurant closed

Den Hoppenhof is a defunct restaurant in Geldrop in the Netherlands. It was a fine dining restaurant that was awarded one Michelin stars in 1983 and retained that rating until 1985.

The restaurant was closed before 1993.

The villa in which Den Hoppenhof was located is to be demolished and replaced by a new building containing six apartments. The actual building of this project was delayed but due to commence in late 2016. During a fire drill in the empty building, something went wrong and the building burned down.

Head chef in the time of the Michelin stars was Jacques Zeguers.

== See also ==
- List of Michelin starred restaurants in the Netherlands
