= Variņi Parish =

Parish of Latvia

- parish of Latvia
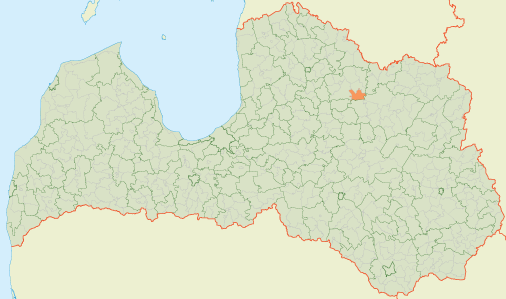
- Coordinates: 57°18′58″N 26°09′22″E
- Country: Latvia

Population (1 January 2026)
  - Total: 660

Variņi Parish (Latvian: Variņu pagasts) is an administrative territorial entity of Smiltene Municipality, Latvia. Prior to the 2009 administrative reforms it was part of Valka district.

== Towns, villages and settlements of Variņi Parish ==
- Variņi - parish administrative center
