= Launkalne Parish =

Parish of Latvia

- parish of Latvia
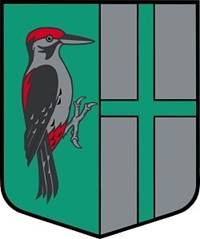
- Coat of arms

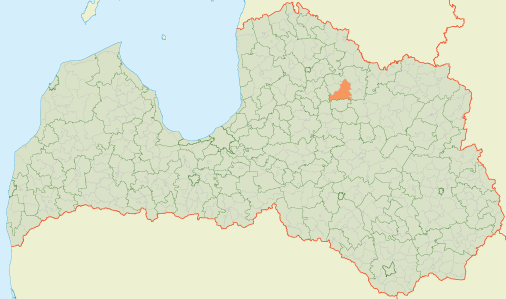
- Coordinates: 57°20′39″N 25°55′53″E
- Country: Latvia

Population (1 January 2026)
  - Total: 1,050

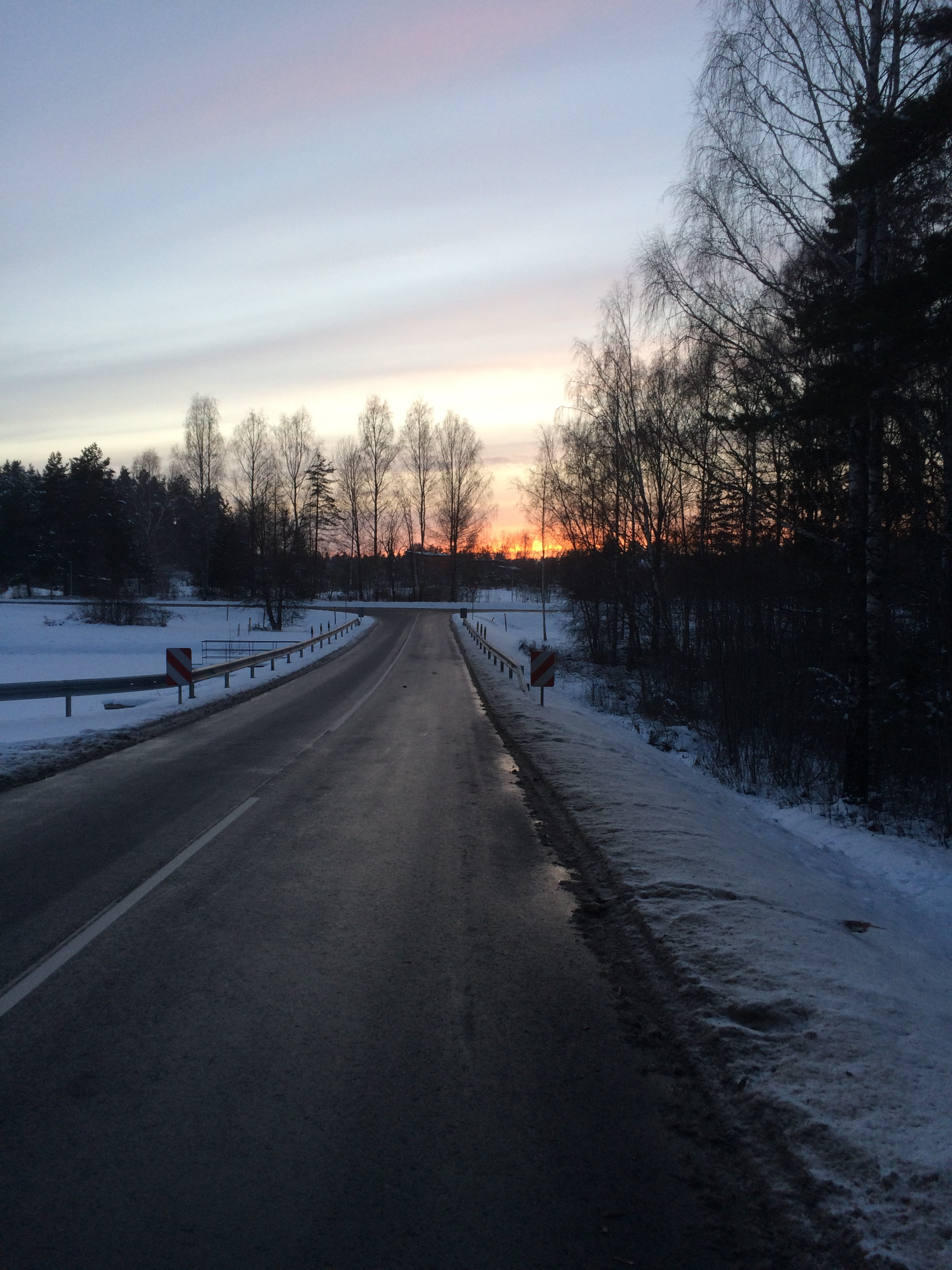
Road on Launkalne

Launkalne parish (Latvian: Launkalnes pagasts) is an administrative unit of Smiltene Municipality, Latvia. Prior to the 2009 administrative reforms it was a part of Valka district.
