= Smiltene Parish =

Parish of Latvia

- parish of Latvia
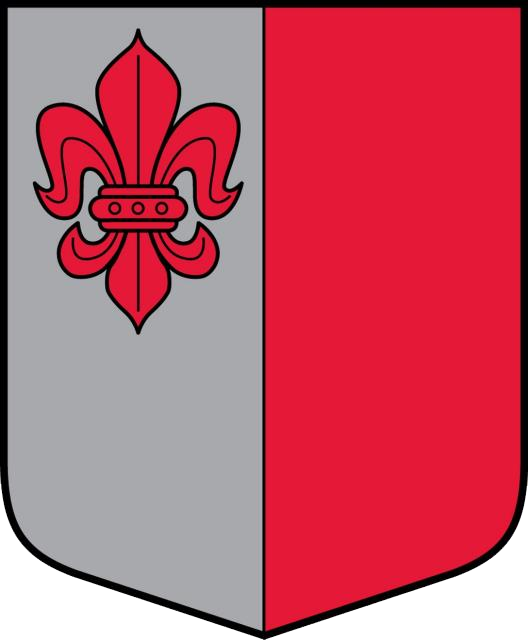
- Coat of arms

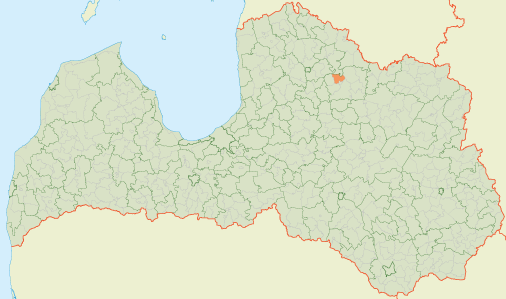
- Coordinates: 57°27′29″N 25°52′34″E
- Country: Latvia

Population (1 January 2026)
  - Total: 938

Smiltene Parish (Latvian: Smiltenes pagasts) is an administrative unit of Smiltene Municipality, Latvia.

== Towns, villages and settlements of Smiltene Parish ==
- Kalnamuiža, Smiltene Municipality, Latvia - parish administrative center
