= Branti Parish =

Parish of Latvia

- Coat of arms

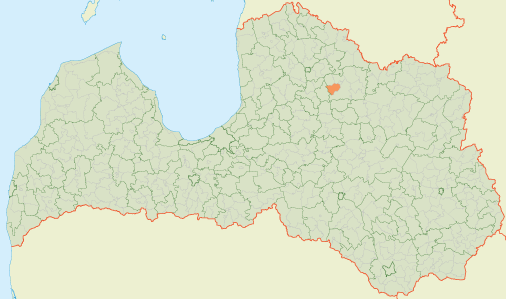
- Interactive map of Branti Parish
- Coordinates: 57°22′34″N 25°47′54″E
- Country: Latvia
- Municipality: Smiltene

Area
  - Total: 82.4 km^{2} (31.8 sq mi)

Population (1 January 2026)
  - Total: 506
  - Density: 6.14/km^{2} (15.9/sq mi)

Branti parish (Latvian: Brantu pagasts) is an administrative unit of Smiltene Municipality, Latvia. Prior to the 2009 administrative reforms it was part of Valka district.
