= Wiesenbach (Rhein-Neckar) =

- Municipality
- Coat of arms

- Location of Wiesenbach within Rhein-Neckar-Kreis district
- Interactive map of Wiesenbach
- Location within Germany Location within Baden-Württemberg
- Coordinates: 49°21′41″N 08°48′10″E
- Country: Germany
- State: Baden-Württemberg
- Admin. region: Karlsruhe
- District: Rhein-Neckar-Kreis

Government
  - Mayor (2019–27): Eric Grabenbauer

Area
  - Total: 11.13 km^{2} (4.30 sq mi)
- Elevation: 138 m (453 ft)

Population (2025-12-31)
  - Total: 3,201
  - Density: 287.6/km^{2} (744.9/sq mi)
- Time zone: UTC+01:00 (CET)
  - Summer (DST): UTC+02:00 (CEST)
- Postal codes: 69257
- Dialling codes: 06223
- Vehicle registration: HD
- Website: www.wiesenbach-online.de

Wiesenbach (German pronunciation: [ˈviːzn̩bax]) is a municipality in the Rhein-Neckar-Kreis in Baden-Württemberg.

== Geography ==
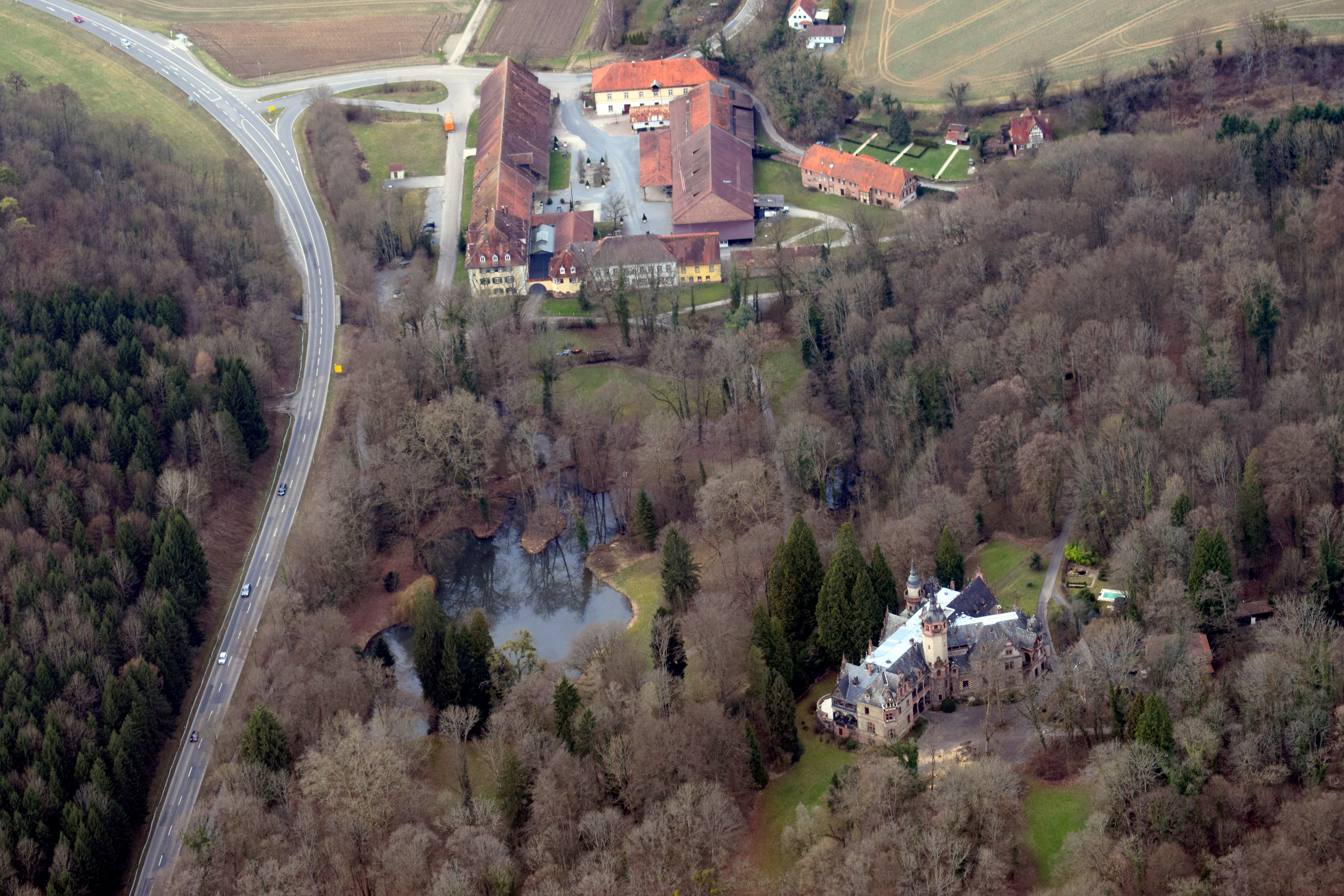
Old and New Castle in Langenzell, both belonging to Wiesenbach

The town sits on the L 532/ B 45, between the heights of the Odenwald and the hills of the Kraichgau about 127 to 327 meters above sea-level. It is 15 km east of Heidelberg.

It is called the gateway from the little Odenwald to the Kraichgau.

The German painter Wolfgang Maria Ohlhäuser lived there for 23 years.
