= Trapene Parish =

Parish of Latvia

- parish of Latvia
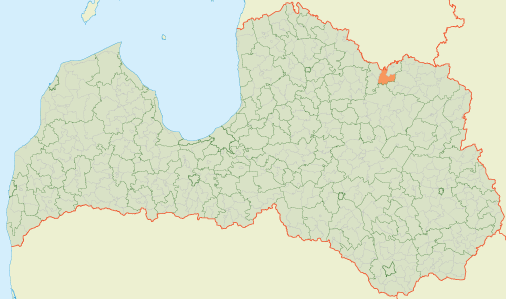
- 57°27′04″N 26°35′32″E
- Country: Latvia

Area
  - Total: 134.40 km^{2} (51.89 sq mi)
  - Land: 134.4 km^{2} (51.9 sq mi)
  - Water: 2.82 km^{2} (1.09 sq mi)

Population (1 January 2024)
  - Total: 644
  - Density: 4.8/km^{2} (12/sq mi)

Trapene Parish (Latvian: Trapenes pagasts) is an administrative unit of Smiltene Municipality in the Vidzeme region of Latvia.

== Towns, villages and settlements of Trapene Parish ==
- Līzespasts
- Ādams
- Rūpnieki
