= Donnery =

- Commune
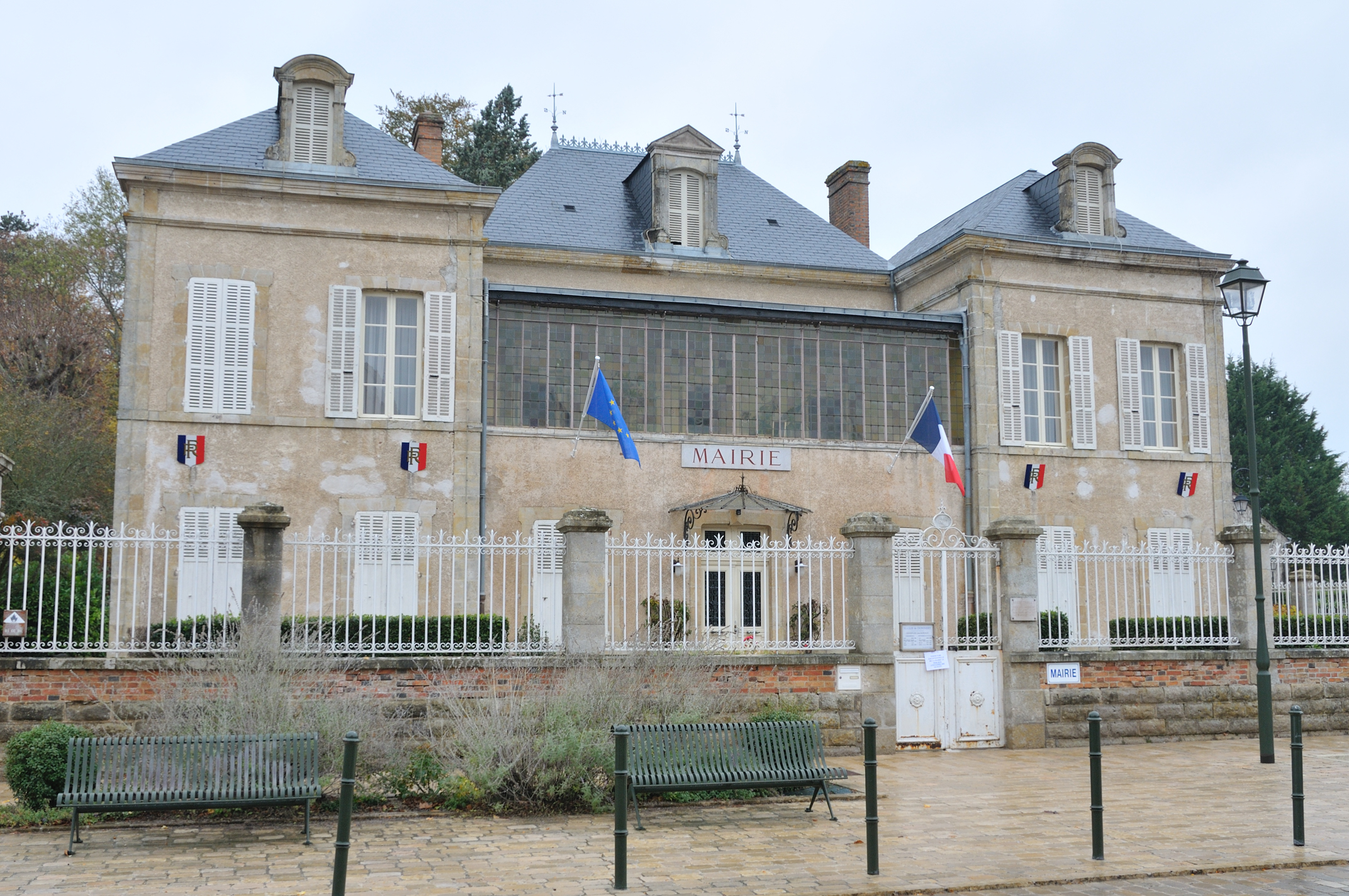
- The town hall in Donnery

- Coat of arms
- Location of Donnery
- Location within France Location within Centre-Val de Loire
- Coordinates: 47°54′50″N 2°06′18″E
- Country: France
- Region: Centre-Val de Loire
- Department: Loiret
- Arrondissement: Orléans
- Canton: Châteauneuf-sur-Loire
- Intercommunality: CC des Loges

Government
  - Mayor (2020–2026): Daniel Chaufton
- Area^{1}: 21.77 km^{2} (8.41 sq mi)
- Highest elevation: 124 m (407 ft)
- Lowest elevation: 99 m (325 ft)
- Population (2023): 2,873
  - Density: 132.0/km^{2} (341.8/sq mi)
- Time zone: UTC+01:00 (CET)
  - Summer (DST): UTC+02:00 (CEST)
- INSEE/Postal code: 45126 /45450
- ^{1} French Land Register data, which excludes lakes, ponds, glaciers > 1 km^{2} (0.386 sq mi or 247 acres) and river estuaries.

Donnery (French pronunciation: [dɔnʁi]) is a commune in Loiret, Centre-Val de Loire, France.

== Population ==
Historical population
Year	Pop.	±% p.a.
1968	651	—
1975	805	+3.08%
1982	1,961	+13.56%
1990	2,054	+0.58%
1999	2,022	−0.17%
2007	2,362	+1.96%
2012	2,653	+2.35%
2017	2,854	+1.47%
2023	2,873	+0.11%
Source: INSEE

== See also ==
- Communes of the Loiret department
