= Gaujiena Castle =

Castle ruins in Latvia

Coordinates: 57.5121°N 26.3951°E

- Vidzeme, Latvia
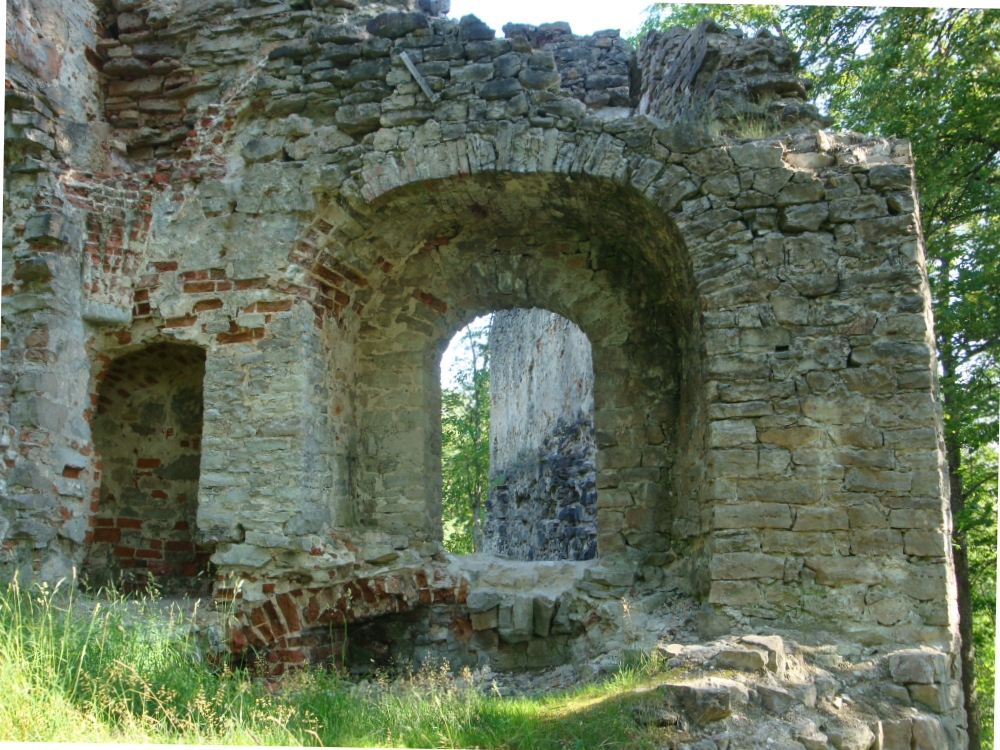
- Castle ruins

Site information
- Type: Castle
- Open to the public: Yes
- Condition: Ruins

Site history
- Built: 1236-1238
- Demolished: 1702
- Events: Great Northern War

Gaujiena Castle (German: Schloss Adsel; Estonian: Atsele ordulinnus) is a castle in the historical region of Vidzeme, in northern Latvia. It was built between 1236 and 1238. Severely damaged in 1702 during the Great Northern War, the structure was abandoned.

== History ==
Atzeles was first mentioned in historical sources in the 1111 Novgorod Chronicle. The land of the Treaty of the division of Talava (1224) Tālava s, called Atzeli, was divided between Livonian Order (northern 1/3) and Archbishopric of Riga (Southern 2/3). Livonian Order from 1238 Early Letgalian Atzeles Castle Mound at the ancient Gauja trade route to Pskov was used as a castle district, later as the command center of the Order.

The time of the construction of the stone castle is unknown, historians believe that it happened at the end of the 13th century. From the beginning of the 14th century, the seal of the Gaujiena commander with the inscription "S [IGILLUM] COMENDATORIS IN ADZELE" has been preserved. After 1342, when the Order built a commander Marienburg castle on the island of Lake Alūksne, Gaujiena Castle became an auxiliary castle. The county books of 1465 and 1517 mention that the castle had a heated interior with a chimney, a castle gate and a forecourt. During this time, the Order fortified the forecourt and built a semicircular tower. For several years, the Livonian Order held the Archbishop of Riga Wilhelm von Brandenburg captive in Gaujiena Castle (1556–1557).

Immediately after the beginning of the Livonian War in 1558, the castle was occupied and destroyed by the troops of the Russian Tsar Ivan IV. In 1582 it was occupied by the troops of the Polish–Lithuanian Commonwealth. During the Polish–Swedish War the castle was conquered by the Swedes in 1600, but in 1602 it was regained by the Poles, and in 1621 again by the Swedes.

After the end of the war, the King of Sweden Gustav II Adolf in 1625 Swedish Livonia presented the Gaujiena castle district to the State Marshal Axel Baner. The inventory description of Gaujiena Castle in 1627 mentions two drawbridges, an inhabited ground floor and a castle chapel, where the church services were held. The plans of the castle drawn in 1634 and 1697 have been preserved in the Swedish archives.

During the Second Northern War, the castle was occupied by Russian troops. In March 1657, the Swedish army launched a counter-attack and besieged the troops commanded by the Vidzeme Voivodeship at Gaujiena Castle ('город Анзел'). In June, the Pskov Voivodeship Matvey Sheremetyev stopped the siege of Gaujiena Castle, but lost the Battle of Walk.

During the Great Northern War in 1702, the castle was occupied and destroyed by the troops of Peter the Great, and after the war the castle lost its military significance as Livonia's eastern border castle and was left to collapse.

1848–1850. Johann von Wolf, the owner of Gaujiena manor, built his manor house in the territory of the forecourt. In 1911, Karl Woldemar von Löwis of Menar carried out archeological excavations in a medieval castle.

== See also ==
- List of castles in Latvia
- Gaujiena Palace
