= Smiltene Municipality =

Municipality of Latvia

Coordinates: 57°26′N 25°54′E

Smiltene Municipality Smiltenes novads
- Municipality
- Flag Coat of arms

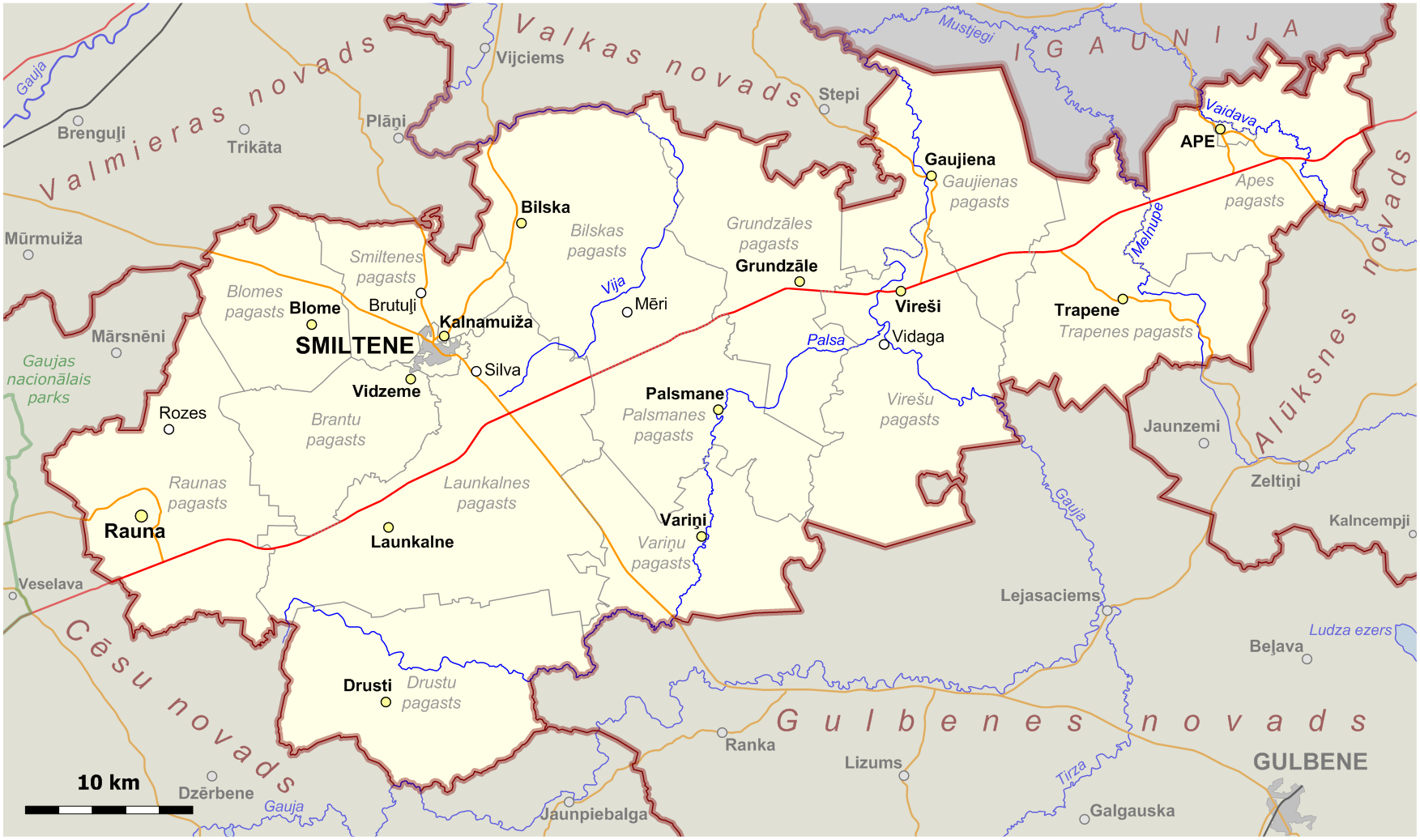
- Country: Latvia
- Formed: 2009
- Reformed: 2021
- Centre: Smiltene

Government
  - Council Chair: Ervins Labanovskis (PRO)

Area
  - Total: 1,801.33 km^{2} (695.50 sq mi)
  - Land: 1,750.92 km^{2} (676.03 sq mi)

Population (2026)
  - Total: 17,306
  - Density: 9.8839/km^{2} (25.599/sq mi)
- Website: www.smiltene.lv

Smiltene Municipality (Latvian: Smiltenes novads) is a municipality in Vidzeme, Latvia. The municipality was formed in 2009 by merging the town of Smiltene with the rural parishes of Bilska, Blome, Branti, Grundzāle, Launkalne, Palsmane, Smiltene and Variņi. During the 2021 Latvian administrative reform, the previous municipality was merged with Ape Municipality and Rauna Municipality.

The administrative centre is in the town of Smiltene. The population in 2020 was 11,985. It borders Estonia.

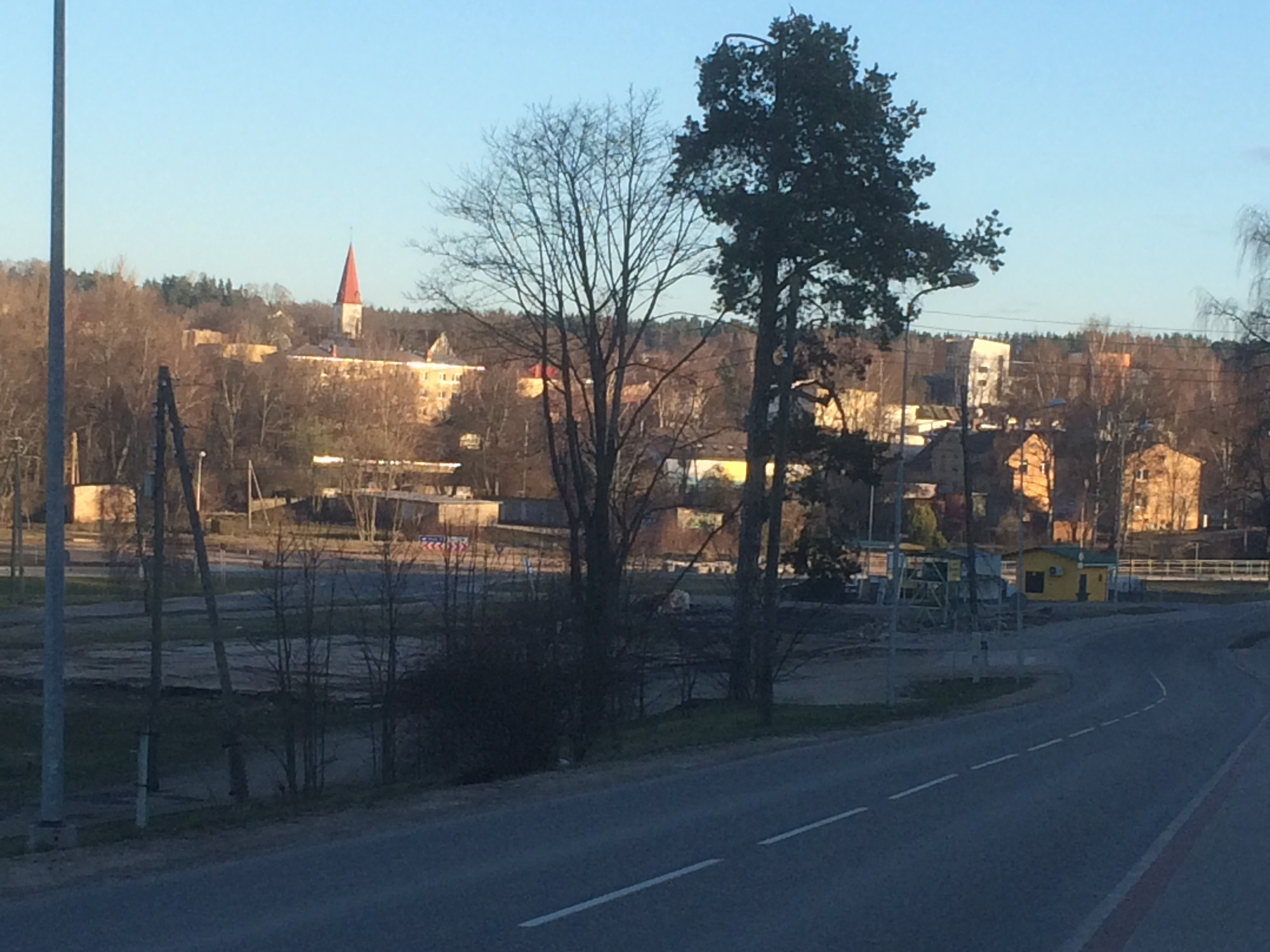
View of Smiltene

== Geography ==
Smiltene Municipality is located in the northern part of the Vidzeme Highland on the banks of the river Abuls (Abula). The largest natural lake is Lake Klievezers (area 3.3 ha) in the southern part of the municipality. In the municipality there are three artificial lakes (reservoirs) created on the river. The largest (10 ha) and most popular is Lake Teperis just east of the town.

== History ==
After the Great Northern War in 1721, the region came under the control of the Russian Empire and became part of the Valka county of the Livonia Governorate.

In 1904, Baltic German Count Paul Lieven (Pauls Līvens) built the first hydroelectric power plant in the Baltics on Lake Teperis.

Between 1949 and 1959, the Smiltene district existed as an administrative unit.

== Twin towns — sister cities ==
Smiltene is twinned with:

- Donnery, France
- Drohobych, Ukraine
- Lviv, Ukraine
- Navapolatsk, Belarus
- Pincara, Italy
- Písek, Czech Republic
- Porkhov, Russia
- Pustomyty, Ukraine
- Rovigo, Italy
- Steinkjer, Norway
- Wiesenbach, Germany
- Willich, Germany

== Symbols ==
The coat of arms and the flag used until the 2021 administrative reform were abolished after the changes in the boundaries of the municipality, with new sketches presented for an online vote in August 2022. The sketches will need to be approved by the Heraldry Commission of Latvia before use.

Coat of arms (2010–2021)

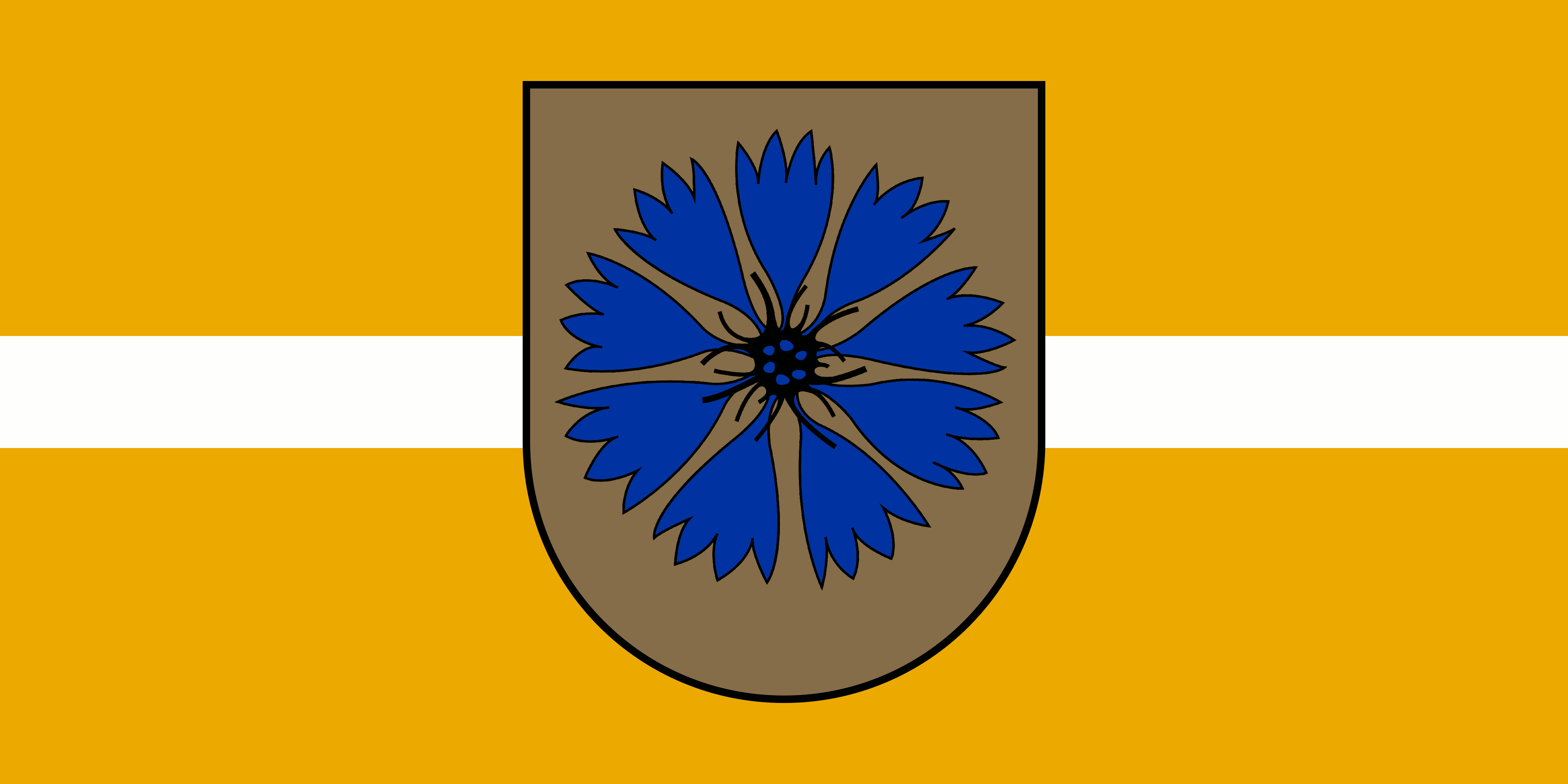
Flag (2012–2021)

== Notable people ==
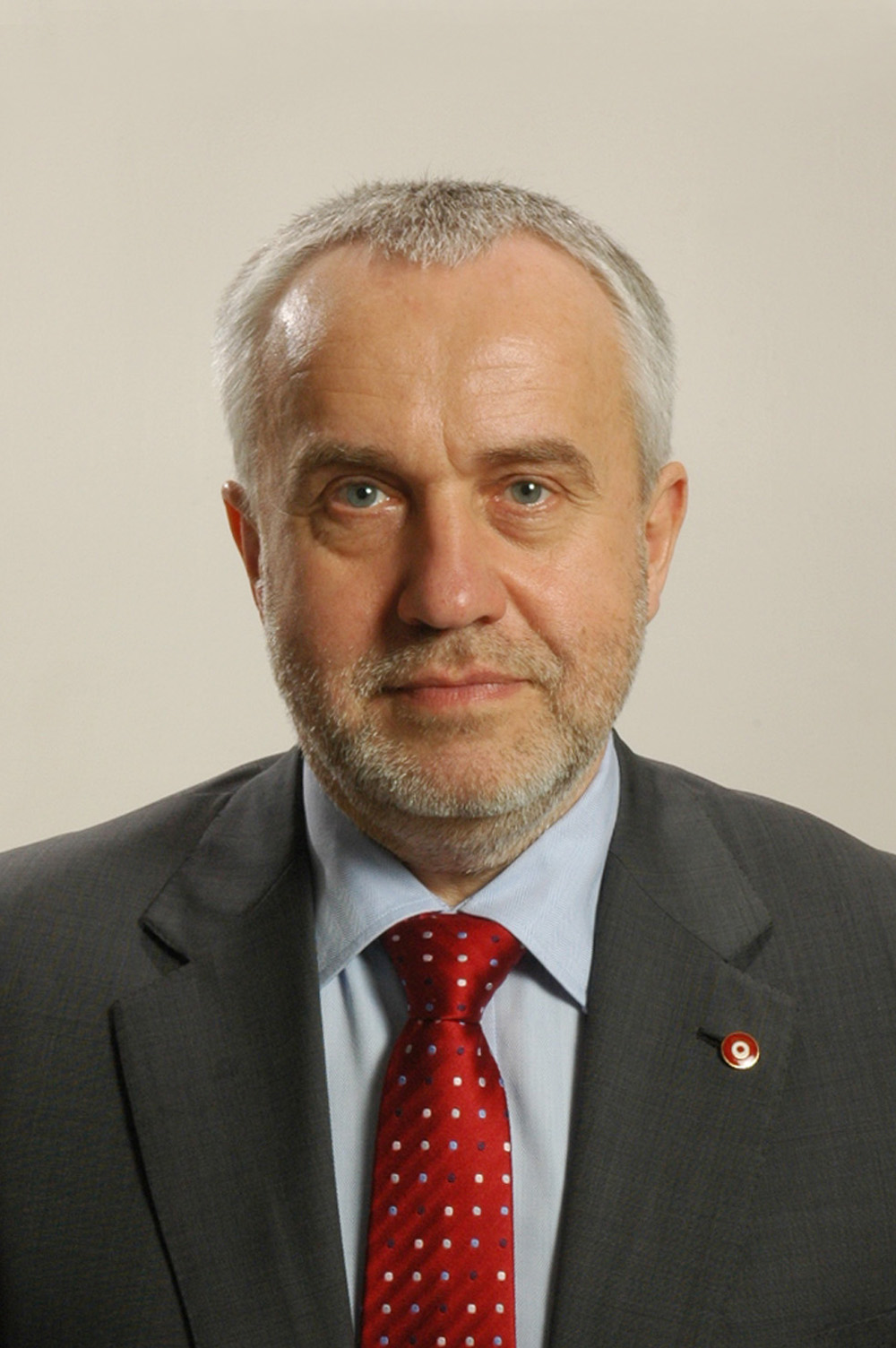
Andris Šķēle, 2010

- Ludwig von Hagemeister (1780 in Drusti – 1834), a Russian Baltic German naval officer, eponymn of Hagemeister Island in Alaska
- Friedrich Bidder (1810 in Trapene Manor – 1894), a Baltic German physiologist and anatomist from the Governorate of Livonia
- Jānis Cimze (1814 in Rauna Parish — 1881), collector and harmoniser of folk songs, organist, founder of Latvian choral music
- Rūdolfs Pērle (1875 in Bilska Parish – 1917), painter, specialised in producing still lifes
- Jēkabs Bukse (1879 in Livonia – 1942), cyclist, competed at the 1912 Summer Olympics
- Ojārs Vācietis (1933 in Trapene Parish – 1983), influential writer and poet.
- Andris Šķēle (born 1958 in Ape), politician and business oligarch; twice Prime Minister of Latvia, from 1995 to 1997, and from 1999 to 2000.
- Guntis Belēvičs (born 1958 in Vireši Parish), politician, Minister of Health, from 2014 to 2016.

== See also ==
- Administrative divisions of Latvia
