= List of twin towns and sister cities in Latvia =

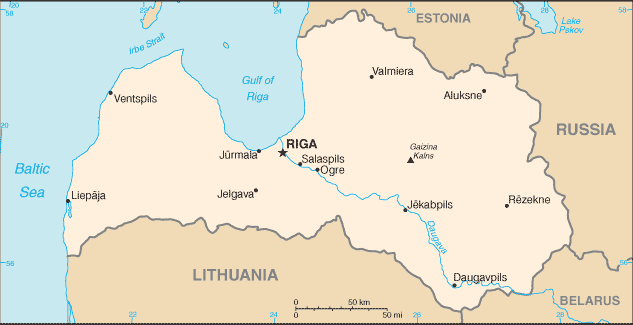
Map of Latvia

This is a list of municipalities in Latvia which have standing links to local communities in other countries known as "town twinning" (usually in Europe) or "sister cities" (usually in the rest of the world).

== A ==
Aizkraukle

- Biržai, Lithuania
- Eppstein, Germany
- Kiskunhalas, Hungary
- Slavutych, Ukraine
- Tczew, Poland
- Thale, Germany

Aizpute

- Karlskrona, Sweden
- Schwerzenbach, Switzerland

Alūksne

- Haanja (Võru Parish), Estonia
- Joniškis, Lithuania
- Misso (Võru Parish), Estonia
- Rõuge, Estonia
- Sundbyberg, Sweden
- Vastseliina (Võru Parish), Estonia
- Võru, Estonia
- Wettin-Löbejün, Germany

== B ==
Balvi

- Balta, Ukraine
- Kupiškis, Lithuania
- Põlva, Estonia
- Żukowo, Poland

Bauska

- Biržai, Lithuania
- Hedemora, Sweden
- (Georgia (country)) Khashuri, Georgia
- Joniškis, Lithuania
- Náchod, Czech Republic
- Pakruojis, Lithuania
- Pasvalys, Lithuania
- Radviliškis, Lithuania
- Rypin, Poland
- Soroca, Moldova

== C ==
Cēsis

- Achim, Germany
- Alytus, Lithuania
- Rakvere, Estonia
- Rokiškis, Lithuania
- Tyresö, Sweden

== D ==
Dagda

- Dubrowna, Belarus
- Narewka, Poland
- Smarhon’, Belarus
- Verkhnyadzvinsk, Belarus
- Visaginas, Lithuania

Daugavpils

- Alaverdi, Armenia
- (Georgia (country)) Batumi, Georgia
- Central AO (Moscow), Russia
- Harbin, China
- Kharkiv, Ukraine
- Lida, Belarus
- Motala, Sweden
- Naro-Fominsk, Russia
- Panevėžys, Lithuania
- Pskov, Russia
- Radom, Poland
- Ramla, Israel
- Saint Petersburg, Russia
- Vagharshapat, Armenia
- Visaginas, Lithuania
- Vitebsk, Belarus

Dobele

- Akmenė, Lithuania
- Ängelholm, Sweden
- Anykščiai, Lithuania
- Joniškis, Lithuania
- Józefów nad Wisłą, Poland
- Konin, Poland
- Schmölln, Germany
- Skhidnytsia, Ukraine
- Ungheni, Moldova
- Viru-Nigula, Estonia

== G ==
Gulbene

- Balmazújváros, Hungary
- (Georgia (country)) Bolnisi, Georgia
- Florești, Moldova
- Kętrzyn (rural gmina), Poland
- Kętrzyn County, Poland
- Khizi, Azerbaijan
- Korop, Ukraine
- Räpina, Estonia
- Rietavas, Lithuania
- Them (Silkeborg), Denmark

Gulbene – Lizums

- Iliny, Hungary
- Sečianky, Slovakia

== I ==
Iecava

- Billerbeck, Germany
- Pasvalys, Lithuania
- Töreboda, Sweden

== J ==
Jēkabpils

- Averøy, Norway
- Białogard, Poland
- Czerwionka-Leszczyny, Poland
- Cumpăna, Romania
- Czeladź, Poland
- Kupiškis, Lithuania
- Maardu, Estonia
- Melle, Germany
- Myrhorod, Ukraine
- Qaraçuxur, Azerbaijan
- Parchim, Germany
- Rokiškis, Lithuania
- Sokołów Podlaski, Poland
- Vyzhnytsia, Ukraine
- Zarasai, Lithuania
- Zhydachiv, Ukraine

Jelgava

- Alcamo, Italy
- Białystok, Poland
- Carmel, United States
- Como, Italy
- Hällefors, Sweden
- Ivano-Frankivsk, Ukraine
- Nova Odessa, Brazil
- Nacka, Sweden
- Pärnu, Estonia
- Rueil-Malmaison, France
- Šiauliai, Lithuania
- Vejle, Denmark
- Xinying (Tainan), Taiwan

Jelgava Municipality

- Alytus, Lithuania
- Argeș County, Romania
- Glodeni District, Moldova
- Joniškis, Lithuania
- Recklinghausen (district), Germany
- Trivero (Valdilana), Italy

Jūrmala

- Ashdod, Israel
- (Georgia (country)) Batumi, Georgia
- Cabourg, France
- Eskilstuna, Sweden
- Gävle, Sweden
- Jakobstad, Finland
- Palanga, Lithuania
- Samarkand, Uzbekistan
- Terracina, Italy

== K ==
Ķekava

- Bordesholm, Germany
- Gostyń, Poland
- Lerum, Sweden
- Nilüfer, Turkey
- Nizami, Azerbaijan
- Raseiniai, Lithuania

Krāslava

- Aleksandrów Łódzki, Poland
- Hajnówka, Poland
- Volokolamsk, Russia

Kuldīga

- Frogn, Norway
- Geesthacht, Germany
- (Georgia (country)) Mtskheta, Georgia

== L ==
Liepāja

- Årstad (Bergen), Norway
- Bellevue, United States
- Darmstadt, Germany
- Elbląg, Poland
- Gdynia, Poland
- Guldborgsund, Denmark
- Klaipėda, Lithuania
- Nynäshamn, Sweden
- Palanga, Lithuania

Limbaži

- Alver, Norway
- Anklam, Germany
- Klippan, Sweden
- Panevėžys District Municipality, Lithuania
- Sande, Norway

Limbaži – Aloja

- Corjeuți, Moldova

Limbaži – Salacgrīva

- (Georgia (country)) Gori, Georgia
- Häädemeeste, Estonia
- Handewitt, Germany
- Nyköping, Sweden
- Qabala, Azerbaijan

Līvāni

- Kamianets-Podilskyi, Ukraine
- Ukmergė, Lithuania

Ludza

- Aue (Samtgemeinde), Germany
- Maków, Poland
- Molėtai, Lithuania
- Rokiškis, Lithuania
- Svishtov, Bulgaria

== M ==
Madona

- Anykščiai, Lithuania
- Bobrynets, Ukraine
- (Georgia (country)) Borjomi, Georgia
- Coulaines, France
- Tranås, Sweden
- Weyhe, Germany

== O ==
Ogre

- Ånge, Sweden
- Bollnäs, Sweden
- Chernihiv, Ukraine
- Haapsalu, Estonia
- Jõhvi, Estonia
- Joué-lès-Tours, France
- Kelmė, Lithuania
- Kerava, Finland
- Maymana, Afghanistan
- Popasna, Ukraine
- Zbarazh, Ukraine

Olaine

- Karlskoga, Sweden
- Nowa Sarzyna, Poland
- Ödeshög, Sweden
- Riihimäki, Finland

== P ==
Preiļi

- Hlybokaye, Belarus
- Nizhyn, Ukraine
- Ocnița, Moldova
- Sahil, Azerbaijan
- Utena, Lithuania

== R ==
Rēzekne

- Arendal, Norway
- Braslaw, Belarus
- Częstochowa, Poland
- Dmitrov, Russia
- Krychaw, Belarus
- Ostrov, Russia
- Pskov, Russia
- Sebezh, Russia
- Sianów, Poland
- Soroca, Moldova
- Utena, Lithuania
- Vitebsk, Belarus

Rēzekne Municipality

- Agder, Norway
- Edineț, Moldova
- Gölbaşı, Turkey
- Kupiškis, Lithuania
- Pastavy, Belarus
- Polotsk, Belarus

Riga

- Aalborg, Denmark
- Almaty, Kazakhstan
- Astana, Kazakhstan
- Beijing, China
- Bordeaux, France
- Bremen, Germany
- Cairns, Australia
- Dallas, United States
- Florence, Italy
- Kyiv, Ukraine
- Kobe, Japan
- Norrköping, Sweden
- Pori, Finland
- Rostock, Germany
- Santiago, Chile
- Suzhou, China
- Taipei, Taiwan
- Tallinn, Estonia
- Tartu, Estonia
- Tashkent, Uzbekistan
- Vilnius, Lithuania
- Warsaw, Poland
- Yerevan, Armenia

Rūjiena

- Higashikawa, Japan
- Karksi-Nuia (Mulgi), Estonia
- Mõisaküla (Mulgi), Estonia
- Montoro, Italy
- Norrtälje, Sweden

Rundāle

- Hajnówka County, Poland
- Põhja-Pärnumaa, Estonia
- Pakruojis, Lithuania
- Ropsha, Russia
- Svislach, Belarus
- Uggiate-Trevano, Italy
- Wiązowna, Poland

== S ==
Salaspils

- Bobrovytsia, Ukraine
- Finspång, Sweden
- Finsterwalde, Germany
- Wieliszew, Poland

Saldus

- Bakhmut, Ukraine
- Briceni, Moldova
- Florești, Moldova
- Lidingö, Sweden
- Liederbach am Taunus, Germany
- Mažeikiai, Lithuania
- Nevarėnai (Telšiai), Lithuania
- Paide, Estonia
- Las Rozas de Madrid, Spain
- Sankt Andrä, Austria
- Sergiyev Posad, Russia
- Šilutė, Lithuania
- Stargard, Poland
- (Georgia (country)) Tsqaltubo, Georgia
- Villebon-sur-Yvette, France
- Volda, Norway

Saulkrasti

- Gnesta, Sweden
- Neringa, Lithuania
- Odolanów, Poland

Sigulda is a member of the Douzelage, a town twinning association of towns across the European Union. Sigulda also has several other twin towns.

Douzelage

- Agros, Cyprus
- Altea, Spain
- Asikkala, Finland
- Bad Kötzting, Germany
- Bellagio, Italy
- (Republic of Ireland) Bundoran, Ireland
- Chojna, Poland
- Granville, France
- Holstebro, Denmark
- Houffalize, Belgium
- Judenburg, Austria
- Kőszeg, Hungary
- Marsaskala, Malta
- Meerssen, Netherlands
- Niederanven, Luxembourg
- Oxelösund, Sweden
- Preveza, Greece
- Rokiškis, Lithuania
- Rovinj, Croatia
- Sesimbra, Portugal
- Sherborne, England, United Kingdom
- Siret, Romania
- Škofja Loka, Slovenia
- Sušice, Czech Republic
- Tryavna, Bulgaria
- Türi, Estonia
- Zvolen, Slovakia

Other

- Angus, Scotland, United Kingdom
- Birštonas, Lithuania
- (Georgia (country)) Chiatura, Georgia
- Chocz, Poland
- Keila, Estonia
- Stuhr, Germany
- Vesthimmerland, Denmark

Skrunda

- Kosiv, Ukraine
- Maen Roch, France
- Põltsamaa, Estonia

Smiltene

- Drohobych, Ukraine
- Písek, Czech Republic
- Wiesenbach, Germany
- Willich, Germany

Strenči

- Lainate, Italy
- Rimóc, Hungary
- Rosice, Czech Republic
- Sayda, Germany

== T ==
Talsi

- Alanya, Turkey
- Chortkiv, Ukraine
- Lejre, Denmark
- Orhei, Moldova
- Prienai, Lithuania
- Saaremaa, Estonia
- Söderköping, Sweden
- (Georgia (country)) Telavi, Georgia

Tukums

- Andrychów, Poland
- Chennevières-sur-Marne, France
- Ghelăuza, Moldova
- Izium, Ukraine
- Karelichy, Belarus
- (Georgia (country)) Khoni, Georgia
- Krasnogorsk, Russia
- Lejre, Denmark
- Plungė, Lithuania
- Saku, Estonia
- Scheeßel, Germany
- Šilalė, Lithuania
- Strängnäs, Sweden
- Tidaholm, Sweden

Tukums – Kandava is a member of the Charter of European Rural Communities, a town twinning association across the European Union, along with:

- Bienvenida, Spain
- Bièvre, Belgium
- Bucine, Italy
- (Republic of Ireland) Cashel, Ireland
- Cissé, France
- Desborough, England, United Kingdom
- Esch (Haaren), Netherlands
- Hepstedt, Germany
- Ibănești, Romania
- Kannus, Finland
- Kolindros, Greece
- Lassee, Austria
- Medzev, Slovakia
- Næstved, Denmark
- Nagycenk, Hungary
- Nadur, Malta
- Ockelbo, Sweden
- Pano Lefkara, Cyprus
- Põlva, Estonia
- Samuel (Soure), Portugal
- Starý Poddvorov, Czech Republic
- Svoge, Bulgaria
- Strzyżów, Poland
- Tisno, Croatia
- Troisvierges, Luxembourg
- Žagarė (Joniškis), Lithuania

== V ==
Valka

- Braslaw, Belarus
- Çamlıyayla, Turkey
- Durbuy, Belgium
- I'billin, Israel
- Kościelisko, Poland
- Kobylnica, Poland
- (Georgia (country)) Kutaisi, Georgia
- Marijampolė, Lithuania
- Novoye Devyatkino, Russia
- Orimattila, Finland
- Östhammar, Sweden
- Tvrdošín, Slovakia
- Valga, Estonia
- Valga, Spain

Valmiera

- Cherkasy, Ukraine
- Halle, Germany
- Høje-Taastrup, Denmark
- Solna, Sweden
- Vallefoglia, Italy
- Viljandi, Estonia
- Zduńska Wola, Poland

Valmiera – Naukšēni

- Borgholzhausen, Germany
- Helme (Tõrva), Estonia

Vecpiebalga

- Aremark, Norway
- Bürgel, Germany
- Marker, Norway

Ventspils

- Lorient, France
- Ningbo, China
- Stralsund, Germany
- Västervik, Sweden
- Vinnytsia, Ukraine
