= Dolomite mining in Lithuania =

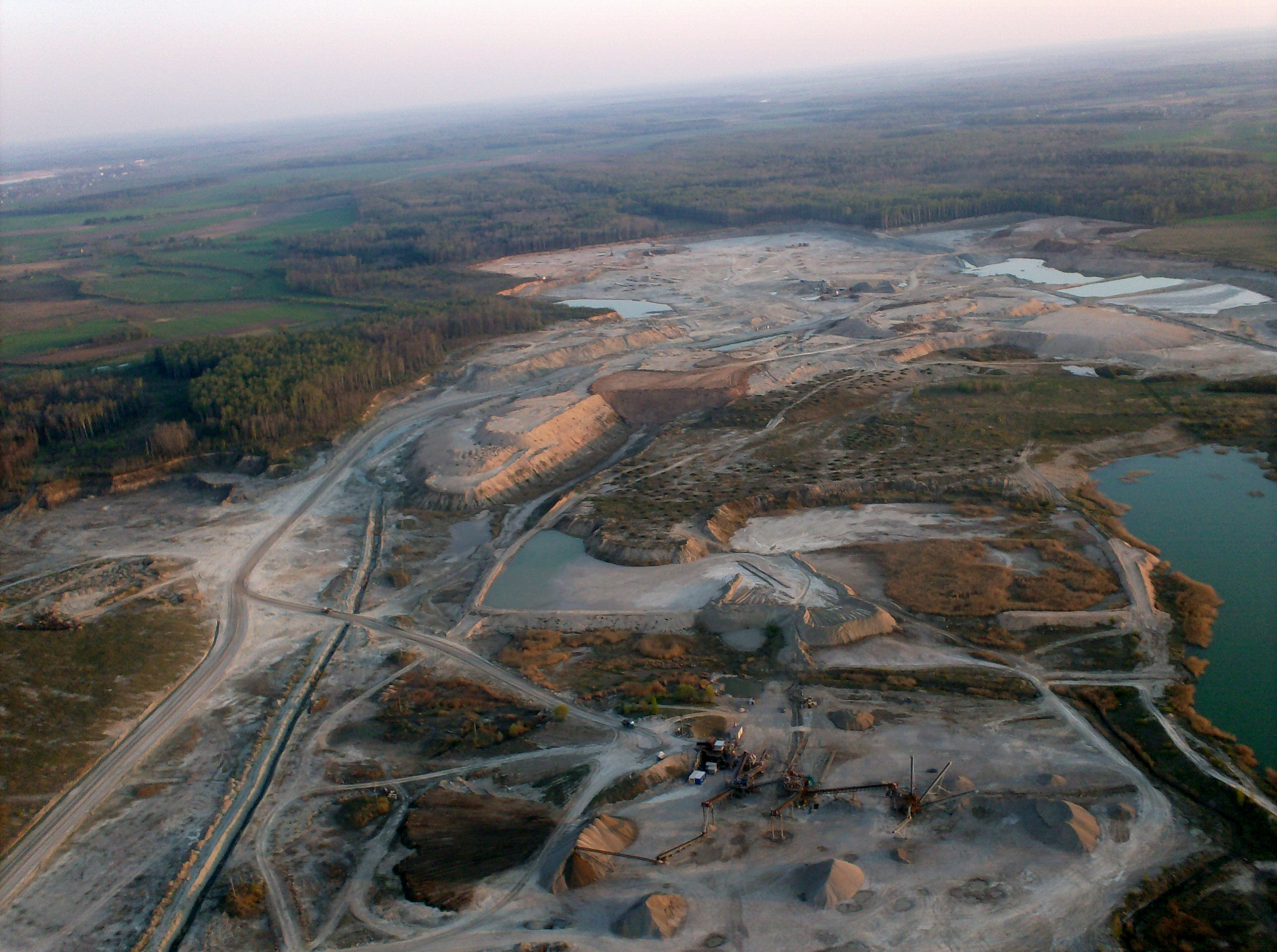
- Petrašiūnai dolomite quarry, one of Lithuania's largest deposits

Location
- Region: Pakruojis, Joniškis, Akmenė, Biržai, Rokiškis
- Country: Lithuania

Regulatory authority
- Authority: Lithuanian Geological Survey
- Website: lgt.lt

Production
- Commodity: Dolomite
- Production: 2.9 million m³ (2023)
- Employees: ~400 (major operators)
- Year: 2023

Dolomite mining in Lithuania represents a significant sector within the country's extractive industries, supplying essential materials for infrastructure development and construction. The industry dates back to the late 1950s and has grown to become a cornerstone of Lithuania's road construction supply chain. Dolomite, a carbonate rock formation, is extracted exclusively through open-pit methods in the northern regions where Devonian period deposits lie close to the surface.

The primary mining operations concentrate in five northern districts, with natural outcrops visible along several river valleys including the Nemunėlis, Apaščia, Švėtė, Mūša, Kruoja, Tatula, and Lėvuo. Three major deposits—Skaistgirys, Petrašiūnai, and Klovainiai—account for most of the country's production. Nearly all extracted material (99%) is processed into aggregate for road paving and concrete production, with the remainder used for lime manufacturing and architectural applications.

== Geology and formation ==
The dolomite deposits exploited in Lithuania originate from the Upper Devonian period, approximately 360 to 380 million years ago. While dolomite-bearing strata occur throughout multiple geological systems in Lithuania—including Silurian, Devonian, and Permian formations—only the Upper Devonian sequences hold commercial value. These economically viable deposits belong to five distinct stratigraphic units: the Pļaviņas, Īstras, Stipinai, Kruoja, and Žagarė formations, all of which outcrop or lie at shallow depths in the northern part of the country.

The formation processes of Lithuanian dolomite reflect two distinct genetic pathways. Primary dolomite precipitated directly from supersaturated solutions in ancient lagoonal environments, creating what geologists term exogenous deposits. Secondary dolomite formed through dolomitization—a diagenetic process whereby magnesium gradually replaced calcium in pre-existing limestone beds. This dual origin explains some of the textural and compositional variations observed across Lithuanian deposits.

In its pure state, dolomite appears white, though most commercial deposits exhibit coloration. Gray, yellow, greenish, or pinkish-red tints result from trace concentrations of iron and manganese compounds incorporated during formation or subsequent weathering. These impurities, while affecting appearance, generally do not diminish the rock's suitability for construction applications.

== History ==
=== Early development (1950s–1960s) ===
The commercial exploitation of Lithuania's dolomite resources began during the Soviet period as part of broader infrastructure development initiatives. The year 1959 marked a pivotal moment when authorities established "Granitas", an association of road construction material enterprises designed to coordinate aggregate production across the Lithuanian SSR. This organizational framework would shape the industry's development for decades to come.

The first technological line dedicated to dolomite aggregate processing commenced operations in Klovainiai during 1959, establishing what eventually evolved into AB "Klovainių skalda". Five years later, in 1964, a second major facility opened at Petrašiūnai under what became AB "Dolomitas", installing its initial production line. These two sites would anchor Lithuanian dolomite production through subsequent decades.

=== Expansion era (1970s–1990s) ===
The industry expanded considerably during the following decades. At its peak employment, the "Granitas" association maintained a workforce exceeding 3,000 individuals distributed across multiple extraction and processing facilities. Annual production during this period surpassed 10 million tons of non-metallic materials, with dolomite and granite aggregate accounting for more than 6 million tons of that total. This scale of operation reflected Lithuania's ambitious road and infrastructure construction programs during the late Soviet period.

=== Post-independence modernization (1990s–present) ===
Following Lithuania's independence in 1990, the industry underwent significant restructuring and privatization. The former "Granitas" association fragmented into separate companies, including what became the Milsa enterprise group and AB "Dolomitas". This transition period saw initial challenges as markets shifted, but by the 2000s, the sector had stabilized with renewed investment in modern equipment and environmental compliance measures. The industry today operates primarily under private ownership while serving both domestic infrastructure needs and regional export markets.

== Deposits and geographical distribution ==
All explored dolomite deposits and prospective areas are located in the Pakruojis, Joniškis, Akmenė, Biržai, and Rokiškis district municipalities. Detailed reserves of dolomite at the end of 2015 amounted to 125 million m³, while forecasted resources totaled 295,651 thousand m³ (2022 data).

=== Pakruojis District ===
The largest dolomite resources are concentrated in Pakruojis District. The Petrašiūnai II deposit, one of the largest in Lithuania, is operated by AB "Dolomitas". The Klovainiai deposit is exploited by AB "Klovainių skalda", where the productive layer thickness reaches up to 10.6 m. The district also contains the Krivaičiai deposit, as well as the undeveloped Margiai and Petrašiūnai III deposits.

=== Joniškis District ===
The Skaistgirys deposit has been operated by UAB "Skaistgirio skalda" since the 1960s.

=== Other deposits ===
In Rokiškis District, the Čedasai deposit is currently being prepared for exploitation. The Akmenė District contains the Narbučiai deposit, which remains undeveloped.

== Mining statistics ==
Eight companies hold permits to use dolomite resources, of which five conduct active mining operations.

=== Annual production ===
Dolomite mining in Lithuania shows a general growth trend, though with fluctuations:

| Year | Extracted (thousand m³) | Source |
|---|---|---|
| 2015 | 1,300 | |
| 2016 | 1,344 | |
| 2017 | 1,873 | |
| 2015-2019 | ~8,800 (total) | |
| 2020 | 2,880 | |
| 2021 | 2,814 | |
| 2022 | 2,704 | |
| 2023 | 2,939 | |
| 2024 | 3,771 | |
| 2025 | 3,016 | |

In 2017, dolomite extraction reached its highest level in nine years – production increased by nearly 40% compared to 2016.

== Mining technology ==
=== Extraction methods ===
Dolomite in Lithuania is extracted exclusively through open-pit quarrying. Important parameters for mining operations vary considerably across deposits. The overburden thickness ranges from essentially zero in some parts of the Skaistgirys deposit to 16 m in the Petrašiūnai II deposit. The productive layer thickness varies from 0.6 m to 10.7 m depending on the location. Water saturation indicators also differ significantly between deposits and must be carefully managed during extraction.

=== Production lines ===
The largest quarries operate modern technological lines with varying capacities. AB "Dolomitas" operates five technological lines at its Petrašiūnai facility. The company's newest and largest line in Eastern Europe began operations in September 2015. This new line can process over 400 tons of dolomite aggregate per hour, while the four older lines together process 750 tons of stone per hour. The oldest production line dates back to 1964.

== Applications ==
Lithuanian dolomite production serves primarily domestic construction needs, though a portion enters regional export markets. The overwhelming majority (99%) undergoes crushing and screening to produce aggregate, while the remaining 1% finds uses in lime production and architectural applications.

=== Construction sector ===
Road construction represents the largest single application for Lithuanian dolomite aggregate. The material serves as base course and subbase in highway construction, where its durability and load-bearing characteristics prove particularly valuable in Lithuania's freeze-thaw climate. Concrete producers utilize dolomite as coarse aggregate, while asphalt plants incorporate it into hot-mix formulations. The reinforced concrete industry employs dolomite aggregate in precast elements and structural applications.

Historical production at Petrašiūnai included decorative slabs sawn from higher-quality blocks, though this represented a minor fraction of total output. The slabs found application in both interior and exterior architectural contexts, valued for their subtle coloration and fossil content.

=== Agricultural amelioration ===
Finely ground dolomite powder serves as a soil amendment throughout Lithuania's agricultural regions. The material addresses soil acidity—a common issue in many Lithuanian farmlands—through its carbonate content. Standard commercial dolomite powder contains approximately 30% calcium oxide, 20% magnesium oxide, and a minimum 85% total carbonates (calcium and magnesium carbonates combined).

Application rates vary according to soil pH levels and texture, typically ranging from 350 to 600 grams per square meter for acidic soils. The calcium component neutralizes acidity while improving soil structure, particularly in heavy clay soils prone to compaction. Magnesium addresses deficiencies common in Lithuanian soils, supporting chlorophyll synthesis and overall plant health. The powder also promotes beneficial soil microorganism populations and can suppress certain fungal pathogens.

=== Industrial applications ===
Beyond construction and agriculture, Lithuanian dolomite finds specialized uses across multiple industrial sectors. Metallurgical facilities employ it as a flux in iron and steel production, where it helps remove impurities and protects furnace linings. Chemical plants utilize dolomite in various processes, while glass manufacturers incorporate it to improve melt properties and final product characteristics. Smaller quantities serve the leather tanning, ceramics, paint, and electrical industries.

== Major companies ==
=== AB "Dolomitas" ===
- Founded: 1964
- Location: Petrašiūnai, Pakruojis District
- Operations: dolomite extraction at Petrašiūnai-2 deposit
- Capacity: up to 3 million tons of aggregate per year (5 technological lines)
- Products: 25 different aggregate fractions
- Employees: approximately 180

=== AB "Klovainių skalda" (Milsa Group) ===
- Founded: 1959
- Location: Klovainiai, Pakruojis District
- Affiliation: Part of "Milsa" enterprise group
- Capacity: approximately 2 million tons of dolomite aggregate per year
- Total production over operating period: over 50 million tons of granite and dolomite aggregate

=== UAB "Skaistgirio skalda" ===
- Founded: 2004
- Operations: Skaistgirys dolomite quarry (since the 1960s)
- Products: dolomite aggregate, gravel, sand
- Markets: Lithuania and Latvia

== Investment and modernization ==
In 2015, AB "Dolomitas" invested approximately €5 million in a new aggregate production line, which became the largest in Eastern Europe. An additional €1 million was invested in infrastructure around the new line.

The "Milsa" enterprise group annually invests over €3 million in technological renewal of the group's production companies.

AB "Klovainių skalda" began implementing an EU investment project in 2019, with a value exceeding €700,000.

=== Major infrastructure projects ===
Lithuanian dolomite aggregate producers have contributed materials to several strategic infrastructure projects. These include the Via Baltica international highway, the Rail Baltica railway connection, and the reconstruction of Vilnius Airport's runway. The industry also supplied materials for the construction of Vilnius's western and southern ring roads and participated in the long-term rural road improvement program.

== Environmental impact ==
=== Reclamation ===
Upon completion of extraction, the quarry-operating company is obligated to rehabilitate the territory, restore the original land purpose, or adapt the area for other needs.

Reclamation approaches vary according to site characteristics and local needs. Some exhausted quarries undergo reforestation, with species selection designed to match surrounding forest communities. Others become water bodies through intentional flooding or natural groundwater influx, serving recreational purposes. Certain sites have been redeveloped for residential or industrial use, while many have been converted into recreational and tourism areas.

In northern Lithuania, where natural lakes are scarce, properly rehabilitated dolomite quarries have become popular water recreation sites.

=== Forest clearing ===
In 2014, AB "Dolomitas" expanded the Petrašiūnai quarry by several hundred hectares, of which 238 hectares consisted of state forest (approximately 1.3% of all district forests). The company paid over 3.5 million litas (approximately €1 million) to the district budget for this expansion. The company committed to reclaiming exploited areas, where water bodies and woodlands are planned.

=== Positive environmental effects ===
Dolomite mining operations have created new landscapes that, when properly managed, contribute to biodiversity. Reclaimed areas provide habitats where rare plants can grow and unique bird species establish nesting sites. Many former quarries have been transformed into tourist attractions, offering geological and educational value while serving as recreational spaces.

== Economic significance ==
=== Market structure and supply chains ===
The dolomite mining industry occupies a strategic position within Lithuania's construction materials supply network. Road construction and maintenance activities consume the bulk of production, with state highway projects and municipal road programs representing major customers. The industry's output directly supports Lithuania's infrastructure modernization efforts, including major transportation corridors and urban development projects.

Geographic proximity to markets strongly influences the economics of dolomite distribution. The material's relatively low unit value compared to its weight makes transportation costs a dominant factor in delivered pricing. Industry sources indicate that hauling distances beyond 250 kilometers render Lithuanian dolomite uncompetitive against alternative sources, effectively defining a natural market radius. This constraint explains the industry's focus on Lithuanian, Latvian, Polish, and Kaliningrad region markets, all accessible within economical transport distances.

=== Production capacity and employment ===
The three major operating companies—AB "Dolomitas", AB "Klovainių skalda", and UAB "Skaistgirio skalda"—maintain combined production capacities between 5 and 6 million tons annually, though actual output varies with construction sector demand. AB "Dolomitas" alone employs approximately 180 workers at its Petrašiūnai operations, while the other major producers maintain workforces of similar scale. Including smaller operators and seasonal workers, the industry provides several hundred direct jobs concentrated in northern Lithuania's rural districts, where employment alternatives can be limited.

Beyond direct employment, the sector generates indirect economic activity through equipment suppliers, transportation contractors, maintenance services, and material testing laboratories. The industry's capital intensity also creates demand for specialized heavy equipment operators, mining engineers, and geology professionals.

=== Regional economic impact ===
For districts hosting major quarries, the mining operations contribute significantly to local tax revenues and economic activity. The 2014 expansion of AB "Dolomitas" operations, for instance, involved a payment exceeding €1 million to Pakruojis District authorities, demonstrating the fiscal importance of these operations to local governments. Such payments help fund municipal services and infrastructure in areas that might otherwise struggle with limited tax bases.

== Future prospects ==
=== Reserve longevity ===
Current extraction rates and reserve estimates suggest multi-decade sustainability for Lithuania's dolomite mining sector. AB "Dolomitas" has publicly stated that proven reserves within its Petrašiūnai II concession area will support approximately 30 additional years of production at current rates. This timeframe assumes continuation of present demand levels and no major expansion of mining areas beyond already-permitted zones.

The broader national picture appears similarly stable. With total proven reserves of 125 million cubic meters as of 2015 and annual extraction averaging around 2.5 million cubic meters in recent years, Lithuania possesses sufficient surveyed resources for five decades or more. However, this calculation oversimplifies the complex interplay of geological, economic, and regulatory factors that actually determine resource accessibility.

=== Challenges and opportunities ===
Several factors may constrain future expansion of dolomite mining despite adequate geological reserves. Environmental regulations have tightened considerably since the industry's establishment, particularly regarding forest clearance and groundwater protection. The 2014 controversy over AB "Dolomitas" expansion into forested areas illustrates the heightened public scrutiny mining operations now face. Future growth may increasingly depend on operators' ability to demonstrate responsible environmental stewardship and effective reclamation practices.

Conversely, Lithuania's ongoing infrastructure development needs suggest sustained demand for construction aggregates. The Rail Baltica project alone will require substantial quantities of materials over its multi-year construction timeline. Additionally, climate change adaptation measures—including road base improvements to handle more extreme weather events—may drive increased aggregate consumption in coming decades.

Technological modernization presents both challenges and opportunities. The industry's 2015-era investments in Eastern Europe's largest processing lines demonstrate ongoing capital commitments, but aging equipment at some sites will eventually require replacement. Whether operators pursue such investments may depend on long-term demand outlooks and potential regulatory changes.

== Tourism and education ==
Several dolomite quarries have become tourist attractions, offering visitors insight into Lithuania's mining heritage. The Klovainiai dolomite quarry in Pakruojis District organizes group excursions that present dolomite mining technology and operations. The Petrašiūnai quarry, also located in Pakruojis District, stands as one of the largest in Lithuania and attracts geological enthusiasts. Many reclaimed former quarries have been transformed into recreational areas featuring water bodies that serve as swimming and relaxation destinations.

== Gallery ==
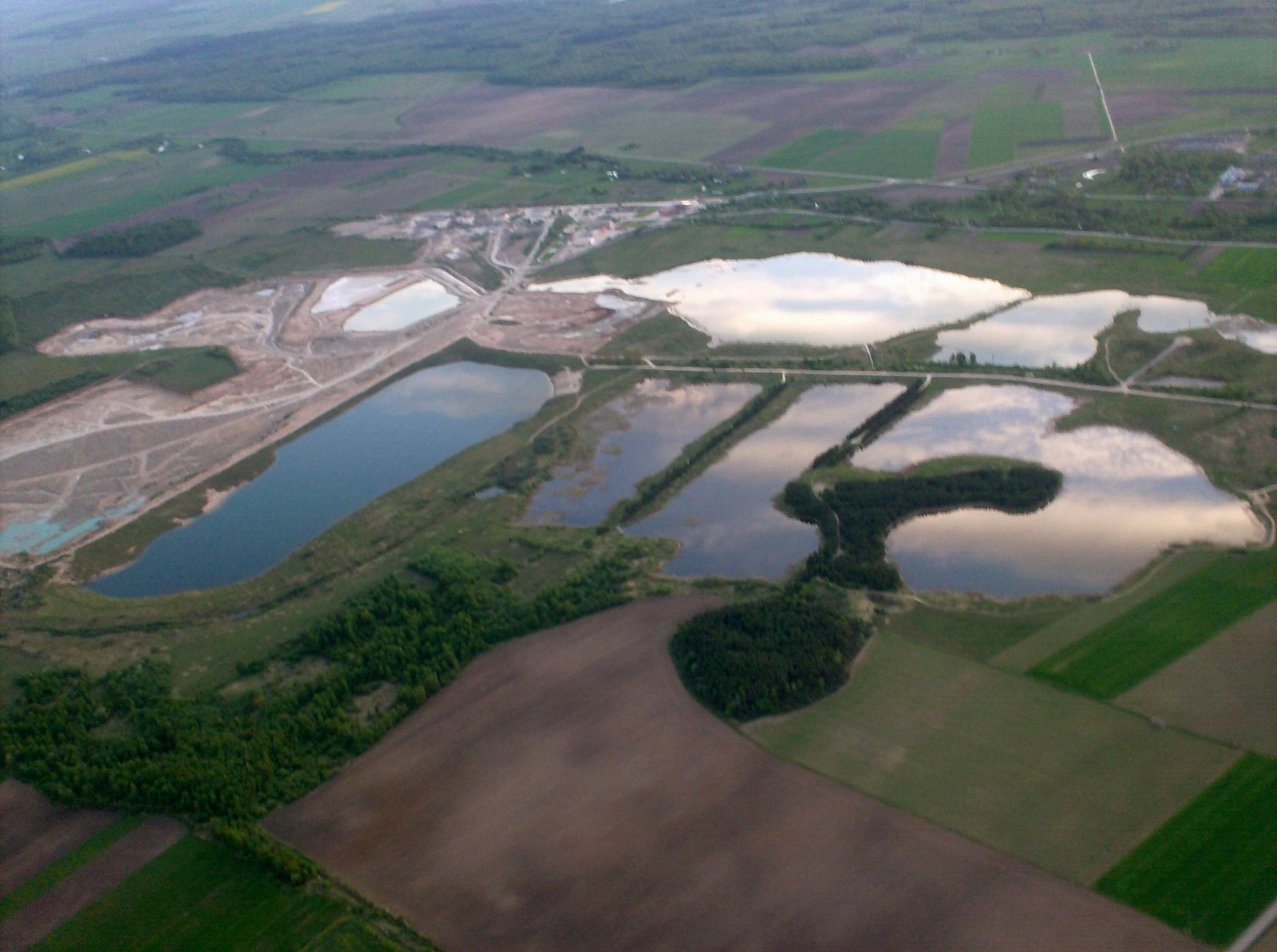
Klovainiai dolomite quarry showing extraction faces and processing equipment

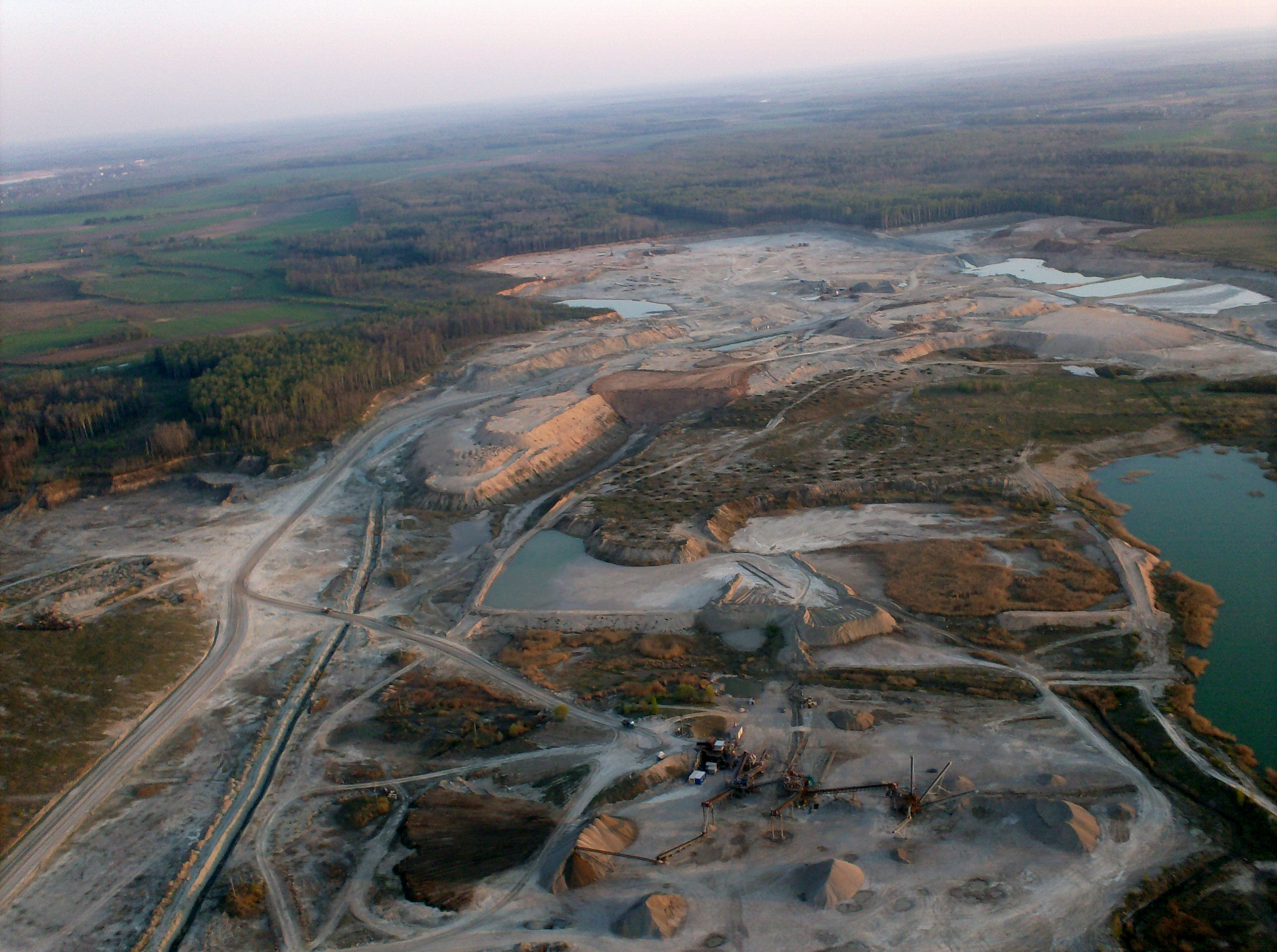
Aerial view of Petrašiūnai quarry, Lithuania's largest dolomite operation

== See also ==
- Geology of Lithuania
