= Strenči Municipality =

Municipality of Latvia

Coordinates: 57°37′N 25°41′E

Strenči Municipality Strenču novads
- Municipality
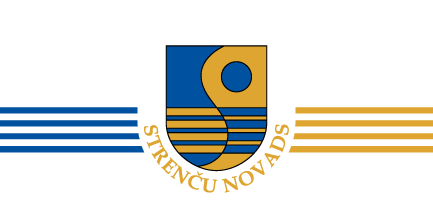
- Flag Coat of arms

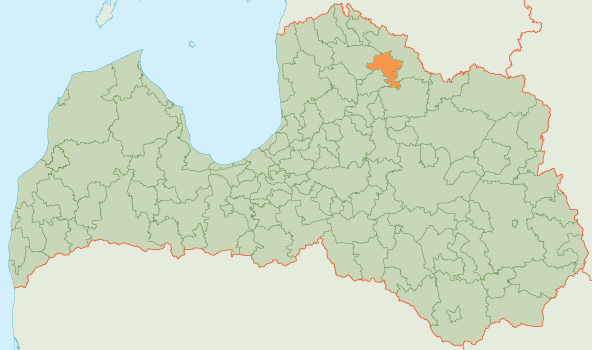
- Country: Latvia
- Formed: 2009
- Centre: Strenči

Government
  - Council Chair: Jānis Pētersons (LZS)

Area
  - Total: 375.50 km^{2} (144.98 sq mi)
  - Land: 356.64 km^{2} (137.70 sq mi)
  - Water: 18.86 km^{2} (7.28 sq mi)

Population (2021)
  - Total: 2,892
  - Density: 8.109/km^{2} (21.00/sq mi)
- Website: www.strenci.lv

Strenči Municipality (Latvian: Strenču novads) is a former municipality in Vidzeme, Latvia. The municipality was formed in 2009 by merging Jērcēni parish, Plāņi parish, Strenči town and Seda town with its countryside territory; the administrative centre being Strenči. The population in 2020 was 2,838.

On 1 July 2021, Strenči Municipality ceased to exist and its territory was merged into Valmiera Municipality.

== Population ==
Territorial unit	Population (year)
Jērcēni parish	410 (2018)
Plāņi parish	544 (2018)
Seda	1231 (2018)
Strenči	1131 (2018)

== Twin towns — sister cities ==
Strenči is twinned with:

- Lainate, Italy
- Rimóc, Hungary
- Rosice, Czech Republic
- Sayda, Germany

== See also ==
- Administrative divisions of Latvia
