= August Reinberg =

Baltic German architect (1860–1908)

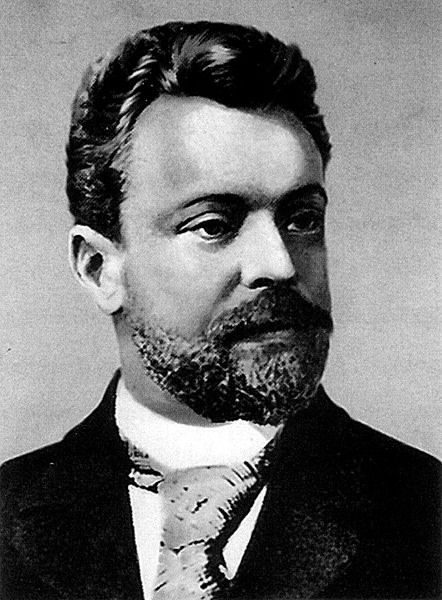
- Born: 16 March 1860; Riga, Governorate of Livonia, Russian Empire
- Died: 17 July 1908 (aged 48); Līgatne parish, Governorate of Livonia, Russian Empire
- Known for: Architecture
- Movement: Eclecticism

August Reinberg (Latvian: Augusts Reinbergs; 16 March 1860 – 17 July 1908) was a Baltic German architect from Riga.

August Reinberg was born in Riga, in the Governorate of Livonia as the son of Jakob Reinberg and Luise, née Kastan.

In 1877, he graduated from Riga City Gymnasium and went on to study architecture at the Riga Polytechnic Institute (now Riga Technical University) from 1877 to 1882.

Between 1881 and 1883, Reinberg worked as an assistant to architect Robert Pflug and contributed to the construction of the Riga Orthodox Cathedral, especially its interior design. In 1883, he earned the title of graduate artist of the third category from the Imperial Academy of Arts in Saint Petersburg, later upgraded to second category in 1894. From 1884 to 1885, he traveled on a study tour through Austria, Italy, France, and Germany to deepen his architectural knowledge.

In 1885–1886, he worked as a teacher at the Riga Polytechnic Institute, continuing his studies under Professor Johann Koch, the dean of the Faculty of Architecture. During the real estate crisis of the 1880s, Reinberg worked for two years on construction projects for the Riga–Pskov railway. From 1888 to 1889, he was again an assistant at Riga Polytechnic Institute and also taught drawing at the city’s Realschule. Around this period, he began researching the history of Riga’s architecture.

In 1889, he co-founded the Riga Architects' Society and became its first chairman. From 1890 to 1899, he lived and worked in Saint Petersburg, where he was awarded the honorary title of "artist, 2nd grade" by the Imperial Academy of Arts. He actively participated in local and international architectural congresses in cities such as Stockholm, Munich, and London. After winning the design competition for Riga’s Second City Theater (now the Latvian National Theatre, originally the Russian Theater), Reinberg returned to Riga to oversee the construction and once again served as chairman of the Architects' Union of Riga.

In 1905, he was appointed adjunct professor at Riga Polytechnic Institute and was also elected to the Riga City Council. He continued to live and work in Riga for the rest of his life.

He designed several apartment buildings in Riga, as well as more prestigious commissions, such as banks in both Riga and Tallinn, a mental hospital in Strenči and the present-day Latvian National Theatre.

== Projects ==
In 1899, Augusts Reinbergs won the competition for the design of the Latvian National Theatre building (at that time, the Riga City Second Theatre). Several buildings were constructed based on his designs, including the Strenči Psychoneurological Hospital, the Latvian National Theatre, and the Bank of Latvia buildings.

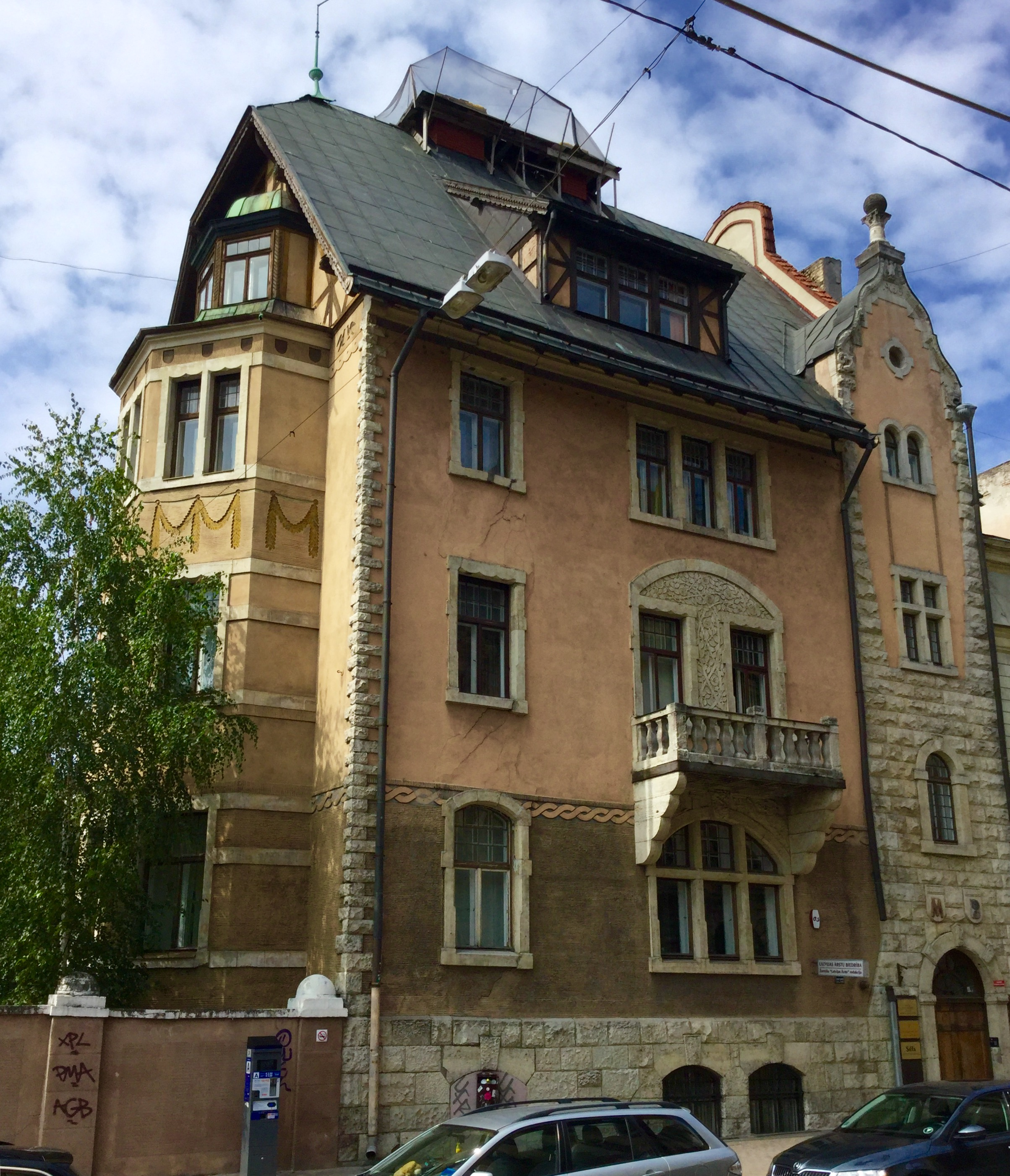
Skolas Street 3 in Riga, Reinberg House (1905)

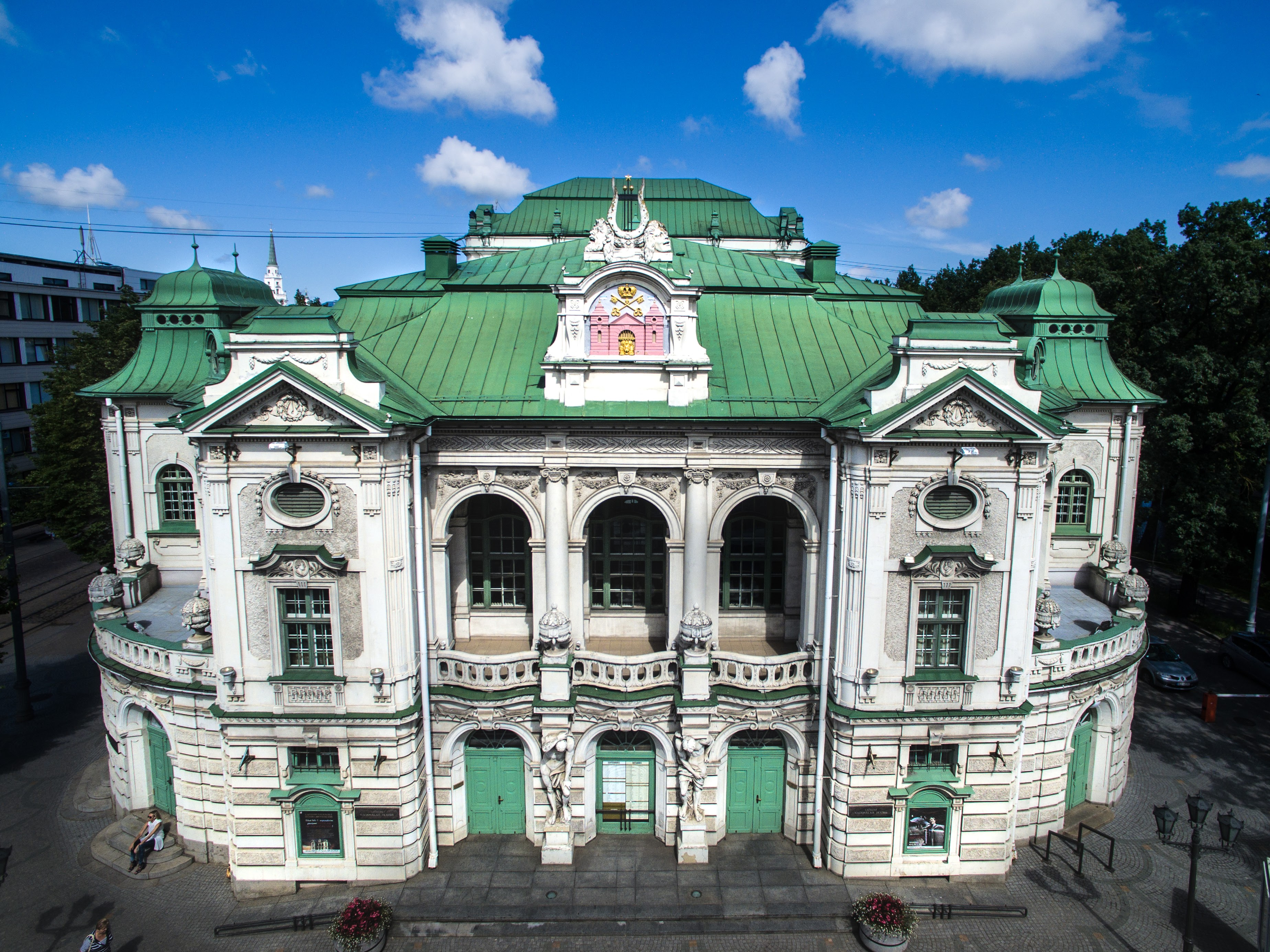
Riga City Theatre No. 2 (1902)

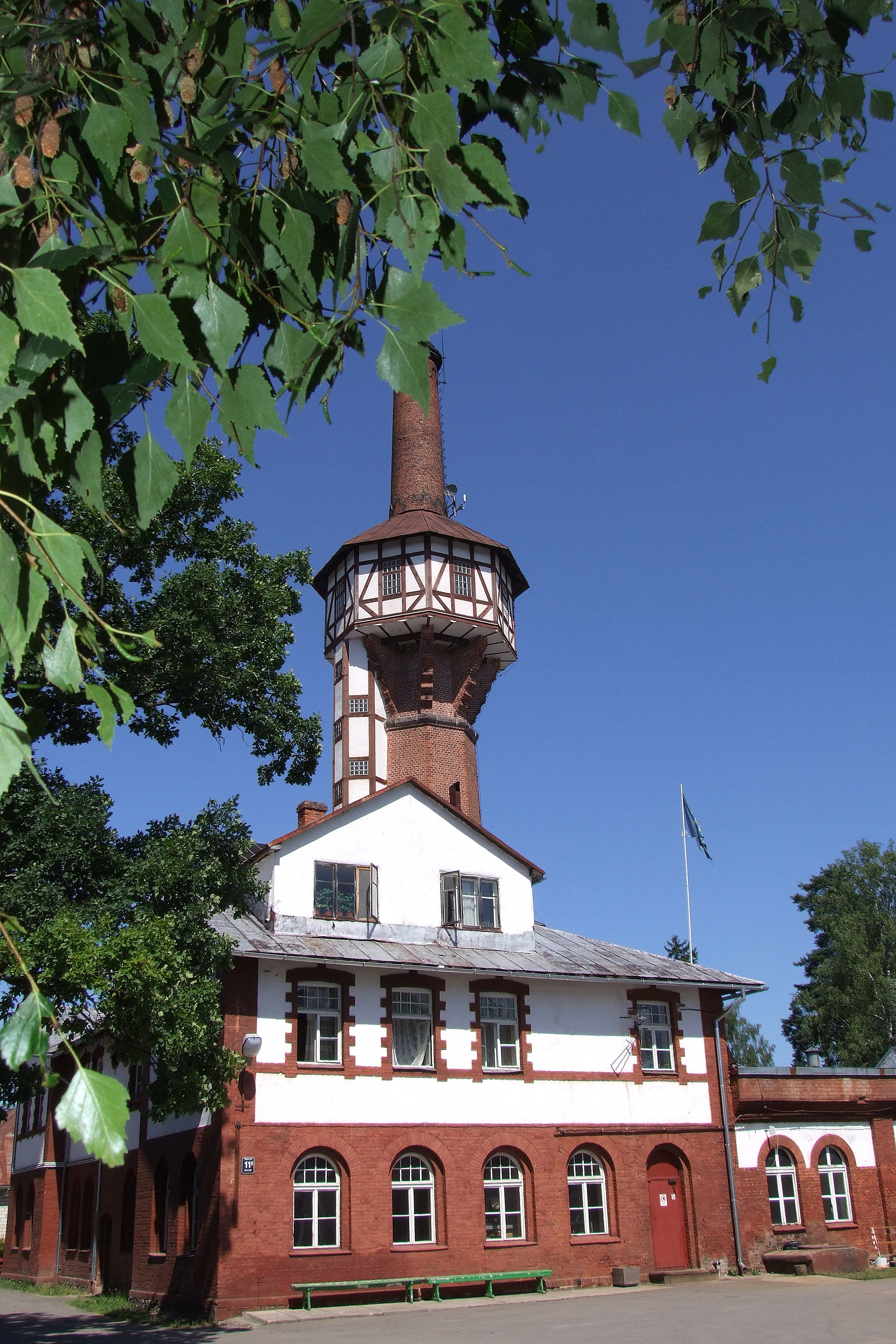
Strenči Psychoneurological Hospital building (1907)

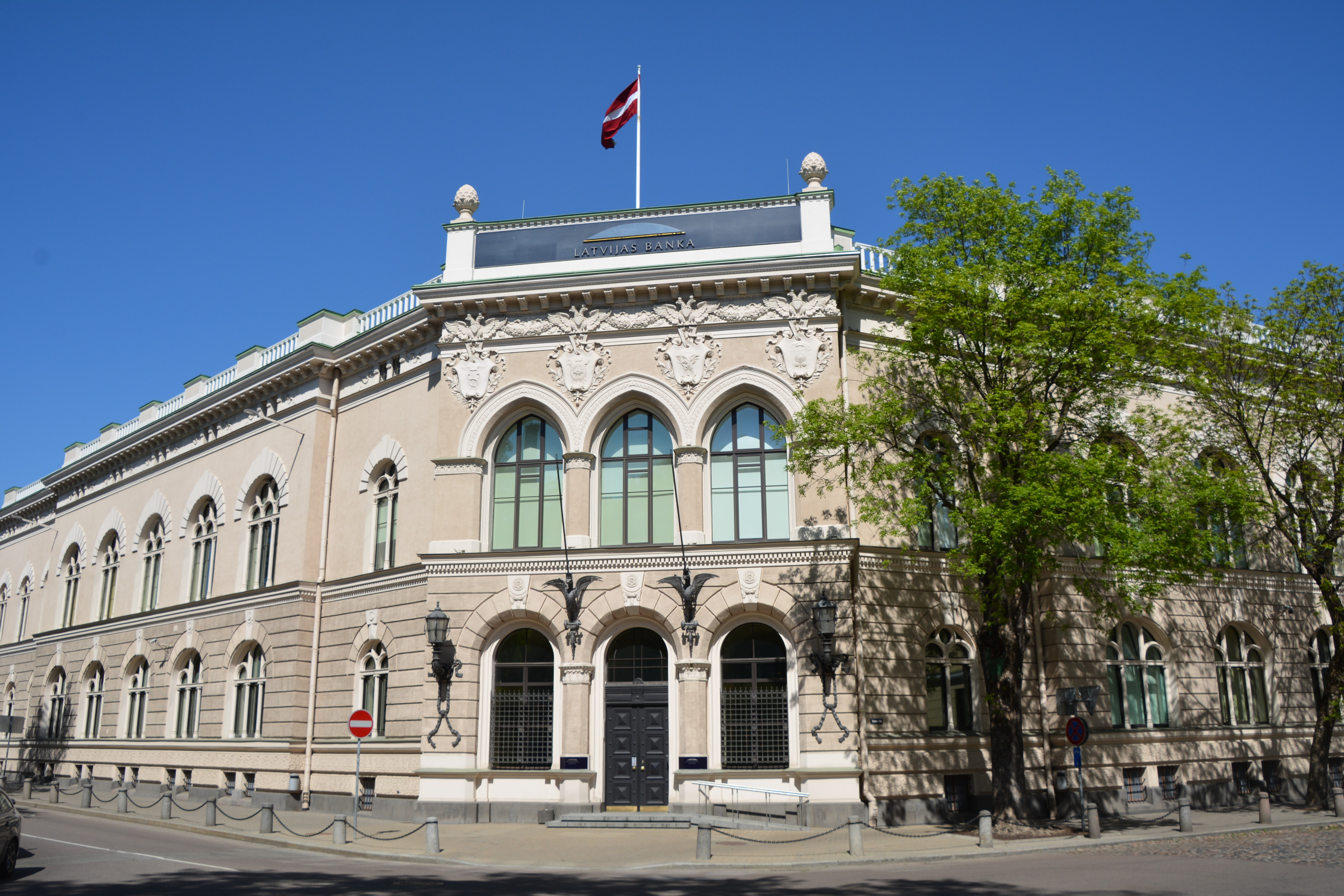
Bank of Latvia building (1901-1905)

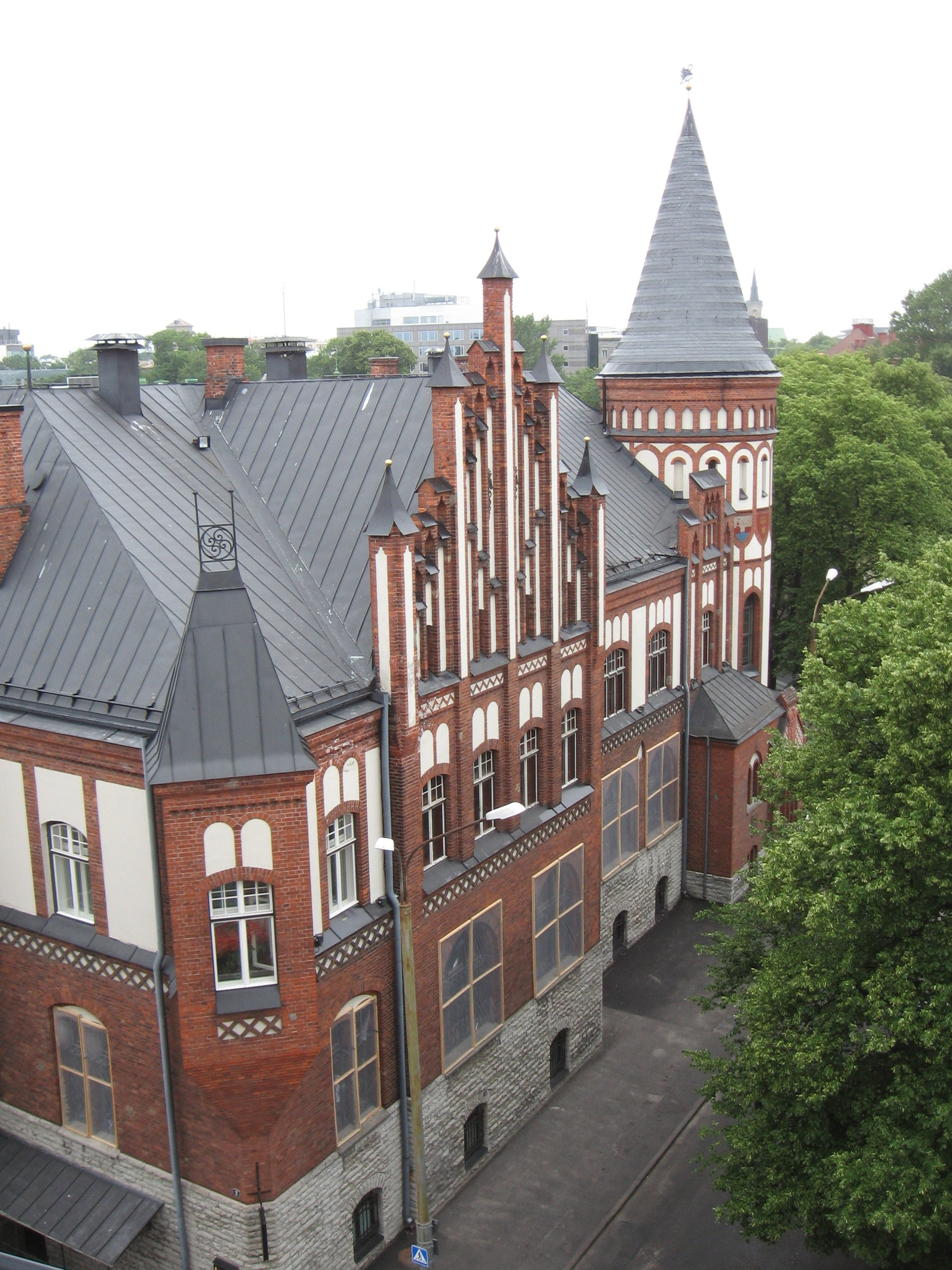
Bank building in Tallinn, Estonia
