= Saugėlaukis Eldership =

Eldership of Lithuania

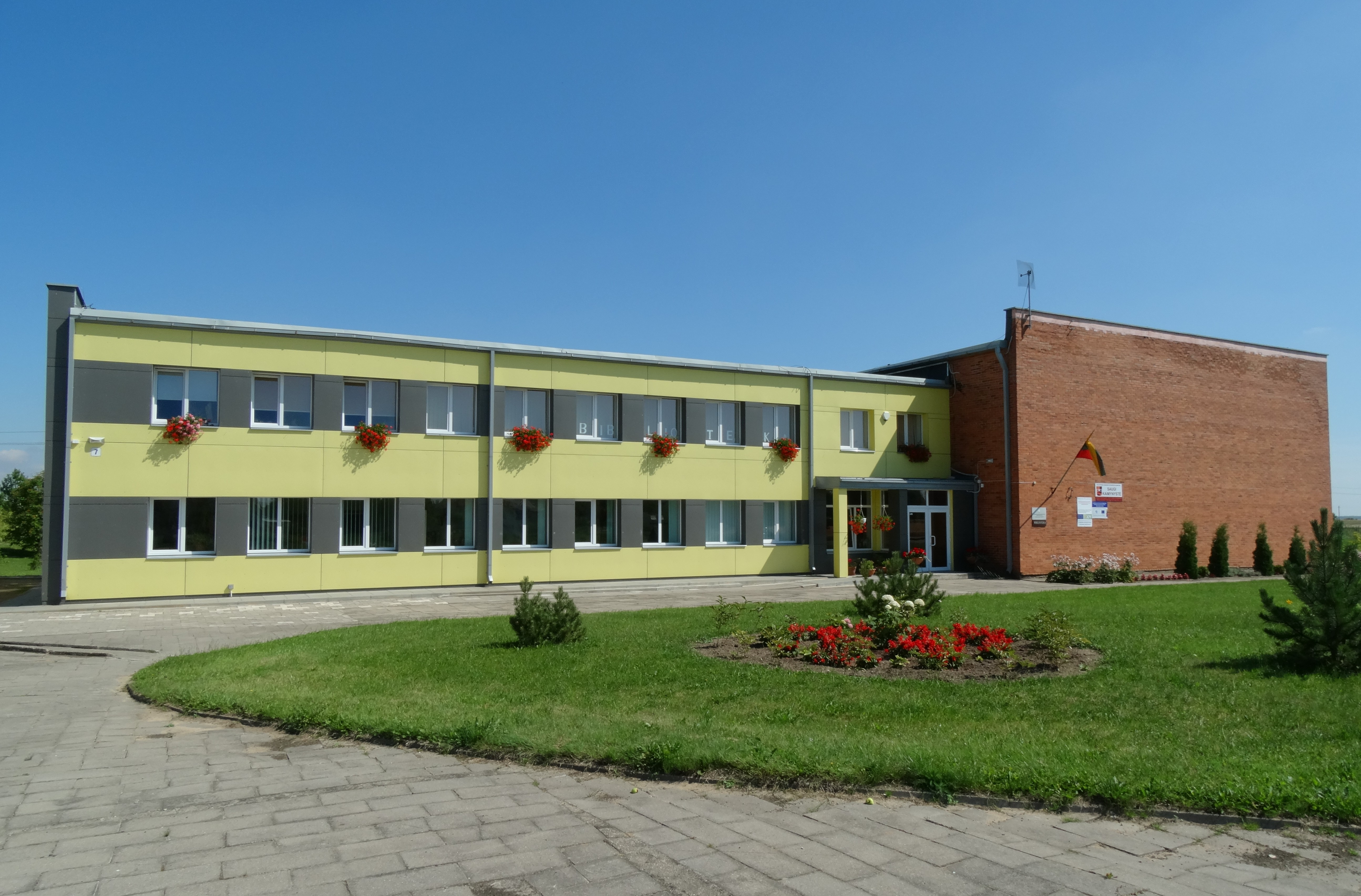
Former school in Saugėlaukis eldership, 2015

The Saugėlaukis Eldership (Lithuanian: Saugėlaukis seniūnija) is an eldership of Lithuania, located in the Joniškis District Municipality. In 2021 its population was 1104.
