= Gaižaičiai Eldership =

Eldership of Lithuania

The Gaižaičiai Eldership (Lithuanian: Gaižaičių seniūnija) is an eldership of Lithuania, located in the Joniškis District Municipality. In 2021 its population was 352.
