= Satkūnai Eldership =

Eldership of Lithuania

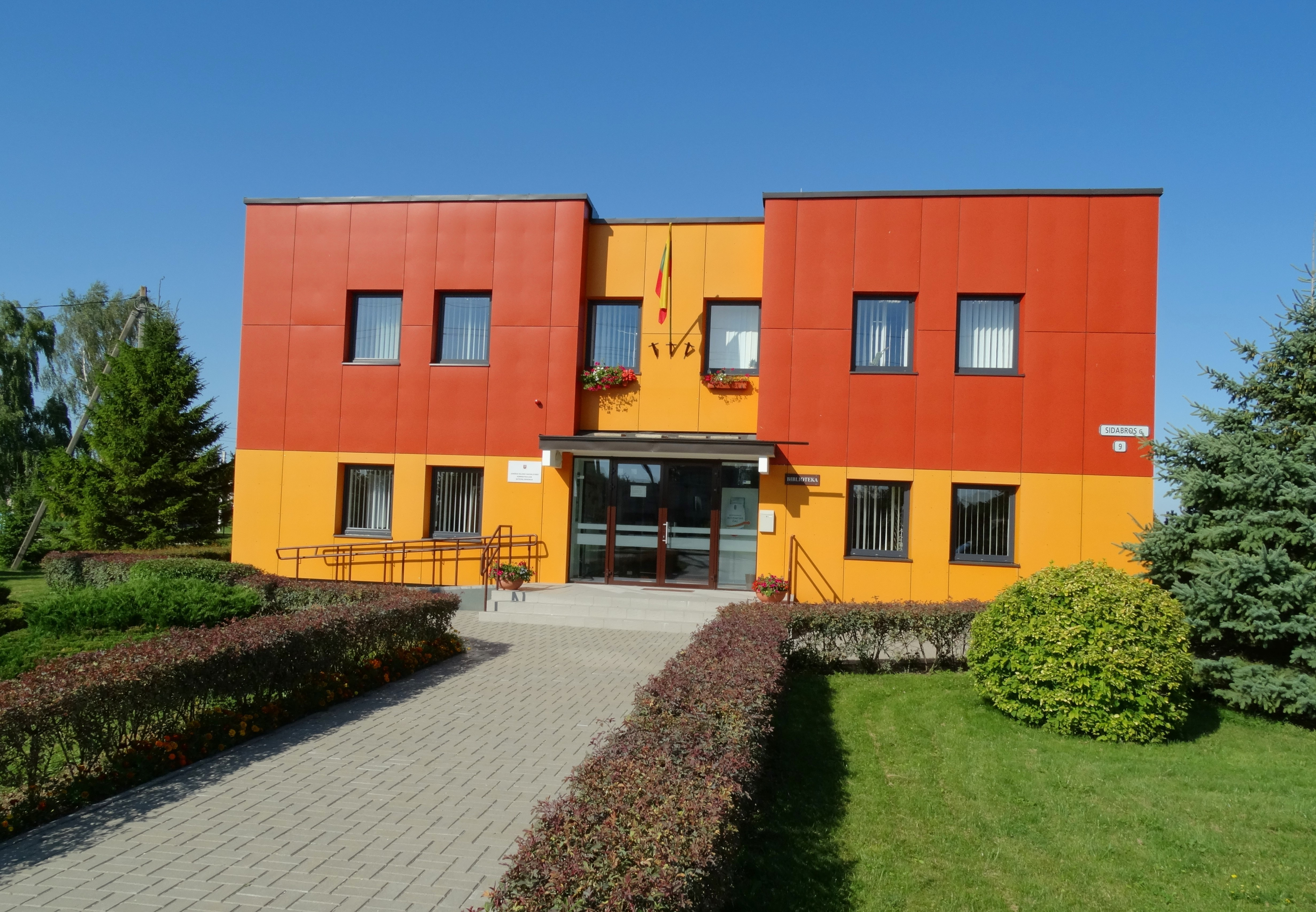

The Satkūnai Eldership (Lithuanian: Satkūnų seniūnija) is an eldership of Lithuania, located in the Joniškis District Municipality. In 2021 its population was 1043.
