= Rudiškiai Eldership =

Eldership of Lithuania

The Rudiškiai Eldership (Lithuanian: Rudiškių seniūnija) is an eldership of Lithuania, located in the Joniškis District Municipality. In 2021 its population was 583.
