= Gataučiai Eldership =

Eldership of Lithuania

The Gataučiai Eldership (Lithuanian: Gataučių seniūnija) is an eldership of Lithuania, located in the Joniškis District Municipality. In 2021 its population was 1,261.
