= Kriukai Eldership =

Eldership of Lithuania

The Kriukai Eldership (Lithuanian: Kriukų seniūnija) is an eldership of Lithuania, located in the Joniškis District Municipality. In 2021 its population was 1088.
