= Seda, Latvia =

Town in Valmiera Municipality, Latvia

Seda
- Town
- Coat of arms

- Location in Latvia
- Coordinates: 57°38′N 25°45′E
- Country: Latvia
- Municipality: Valmiera Municipality
- Town rights: 1991

Government
  - Head of the Strenči Association: Jānis Pētersons

Area
  - Total: 2.02 km^{2} (0.78 sq mi)
  - Land: 1.99 km^{2} (0.77 sq mi)
  - Water: 0.03 km^{2} (0.012 sq mi)

Population (2026)
  - Total: 1,121
  - Density: 563/km^{2} (1,460/sq mi)
- Time zone: UTC+2 (EET)
  - Summer (DST): UTC+3 (EEST)
- Postal code: LV-4728
- Calling code: +371 647
- Website: http://www.valka.lv/?id=96

Seda is a town in Valmiera Municipality in the Vidzeme region of Latvia. It was founded in 1952. The major local industry is extraction of peat. The town is remarkable for its 1950s-style Stalinist architecture, dating from the glory days of Seda, when workers from all over the Soviet Union came to work for the peat extraction enterprise.

Joint stock company "Seda" is still a major employer.

The town and its people were the subject of the documentary film Seda: People of the Marsh (Latvian: Seda. Purva ļaudis; director Kaspars Goba; Latvia/Germany, 2004).

== Gallery ==
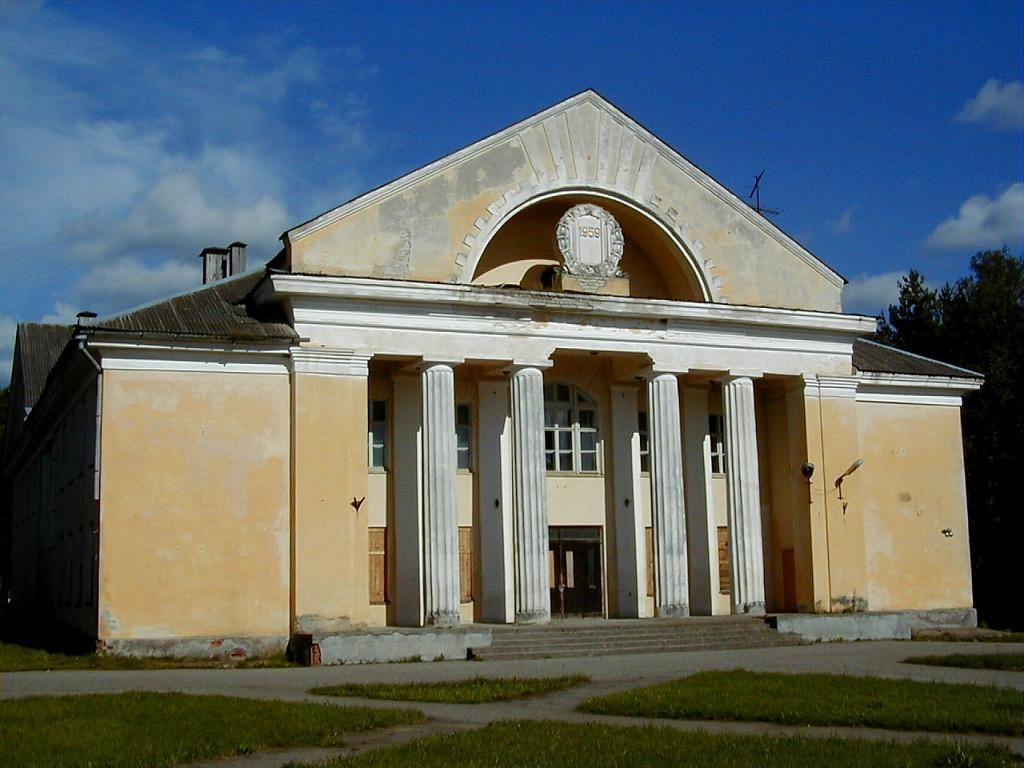
Recreation centre in Seda

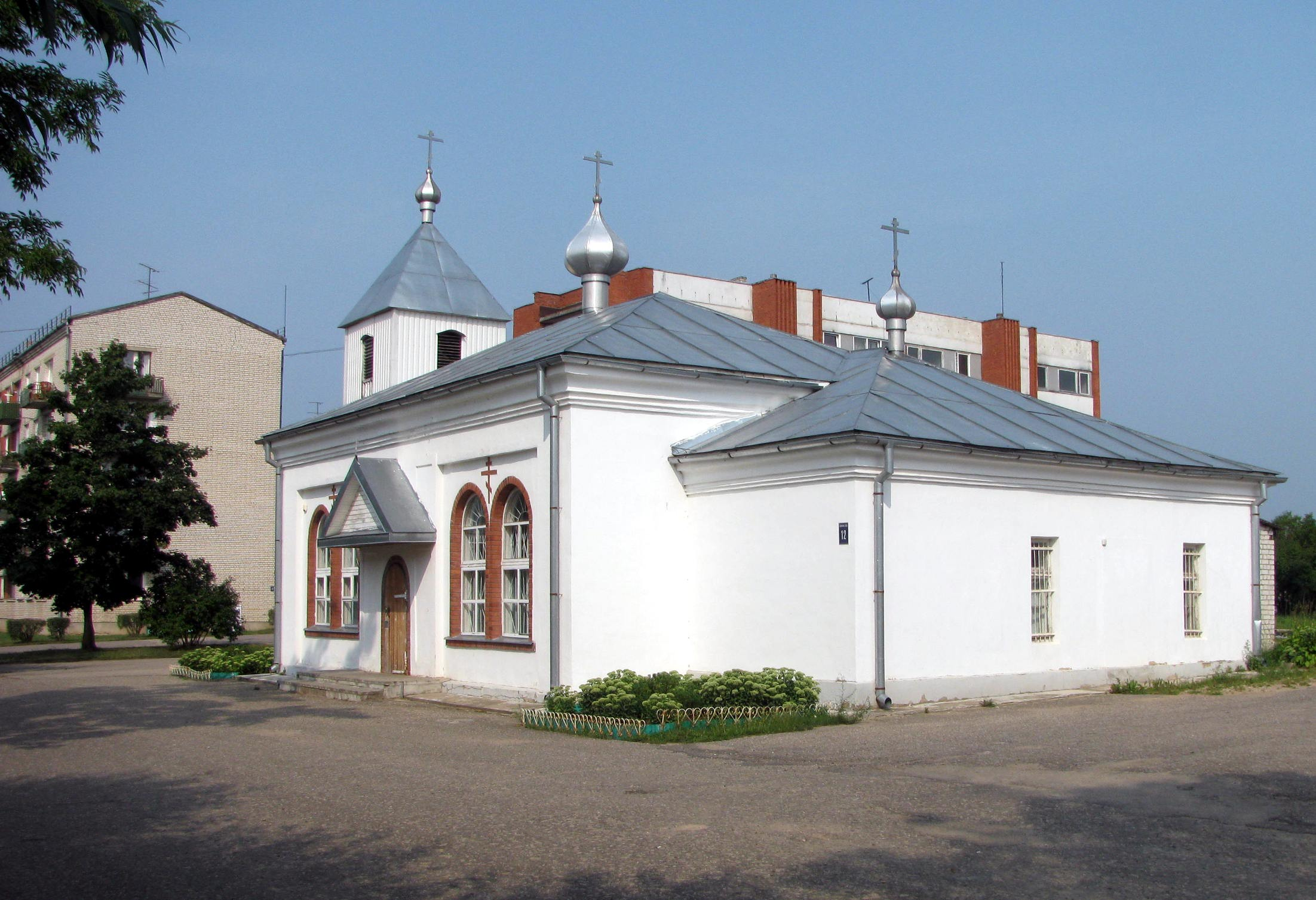
Russian Orthodox church in Seda

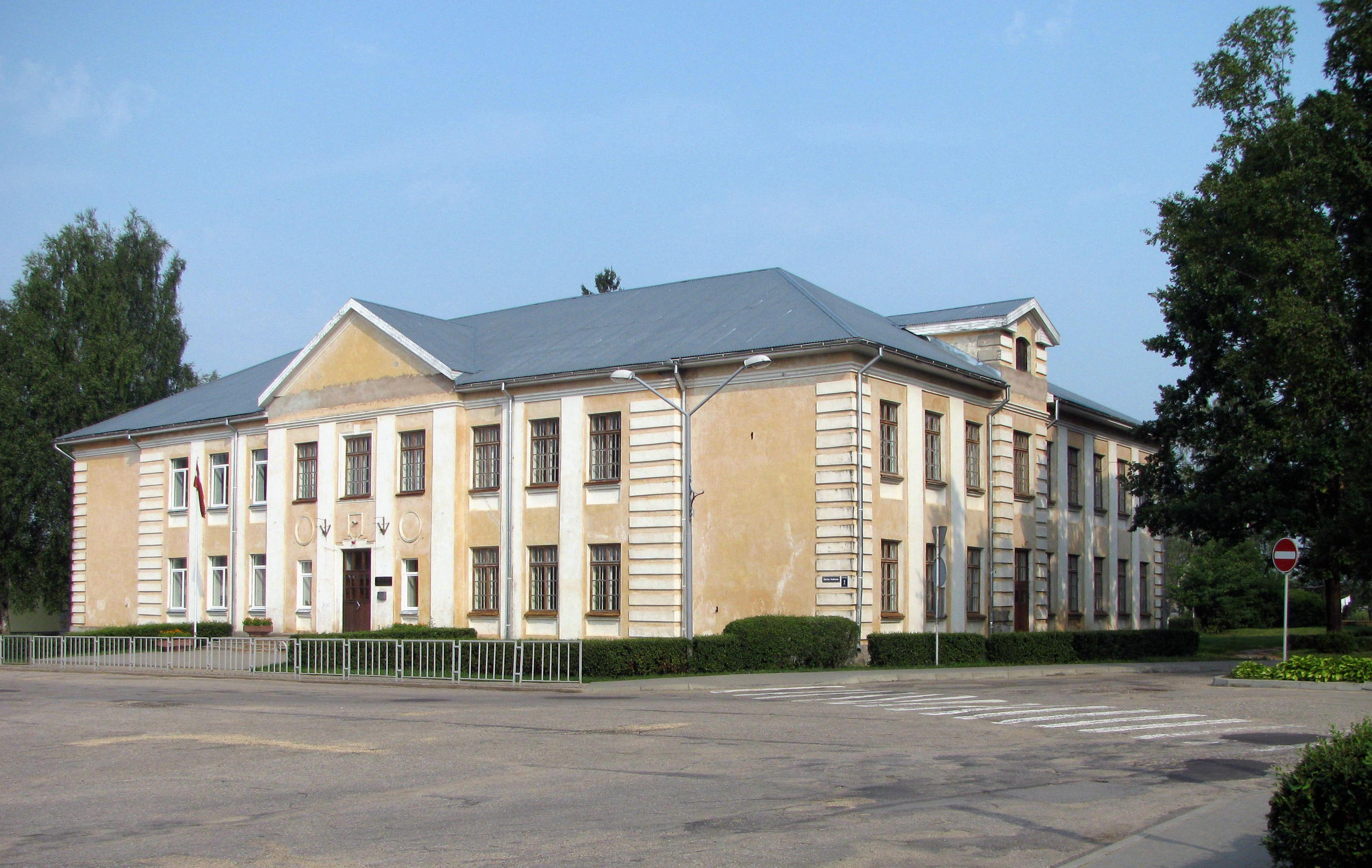
Seda Secondary School

== See also ==
- List of cities in Latvia
