= Strenči Psychoneurological Hospital =

Psychiatric hospital in Latvia

Coordinates: 57°37′37.5″N 25°42′5.8″E

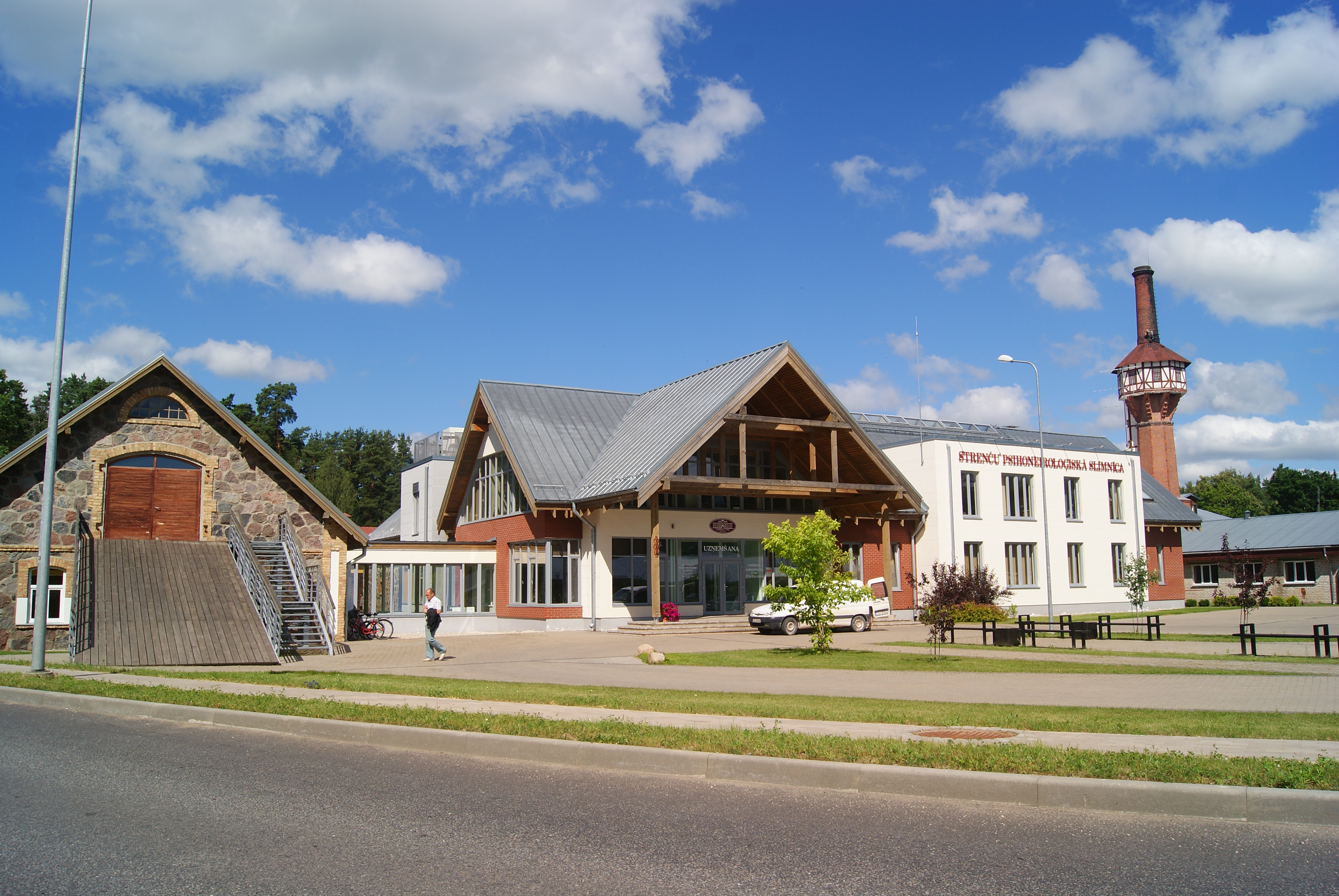
Main entrance

Strenči Psychoneurological Hospital (Latvian: VSIA Strenču Psihoneiroloģiskā slimnīca) is a state-owned psychiatric hospital located in Strenči, Latvia. The hospital specializes in providing mental health care, including the diagnosis, treatment, and rehabilitation of patients with various psychiatric disorders.

== History ==
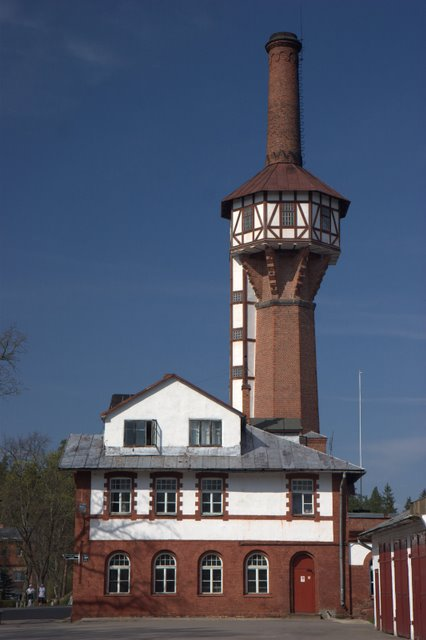
Hospital chimney / water tower

In 1899, on the initiative of the Livonian Knighthood, it was decided to build a psychiatric hospital for the Governorate of Livonia (at that time in Latvian: Vājprātīgo iestāde Strenčos, German: Livländische Landes-Irrenanstalt bei Stackeln), with construction starting in 1903. The project was designed by architect August Reinberg. The hospital was opened on February 10, 1907 (January 28 in the old style), and its complex included modern amenities for that time such as central heating, electricity, water supply, drainage system, workshops, and auxiliary facilities. The first director of the hospital was Alberts Bērs (1907-1919). Initially, the institution had 180 beds, with three doctors, six nurses, one feldsher, 8 senior, and 55 junior patient attendants, among others. Treatment primarily utilized work and hydrotherapy. A library was established where various events were held.

The government of the Republic of Latvia took over Strenči Psychiatric Hospital in 1919, and the number of patients increased from 114 in 1919 to 364 in 1940. The hospital complex was expanded with an estate barn, cellar, cattle shed, concrete oil cellar, chapel with an autopsy room, and a morgue. The hospital directors during this time were Hermanis Hildebrands (1920-1927) and Arvēds Sukurs (1927-1938, 1940-1942). During World War II, in 1943, the Nazis shot 294 psychiatric hospital patients; a monument was erected at the site of their killing after the war. The hospital was used for the needs of the German army’s war hospital and reconnaissance school.

After the war, in 1950, the hospital treated 403 patients, and after 1978, the number of patients exceeded a thousand. The main treatment methods were insulin therapy and electroshock therapy, and neuroleptic drugs started being used in 1957. In 1974, the hospital also began treating patients with addictions.

Today, the hospital operates as a state-owned limited company (valsts sabiedrība ar ierobežotu atbildību).
