= Rosice =

- Town
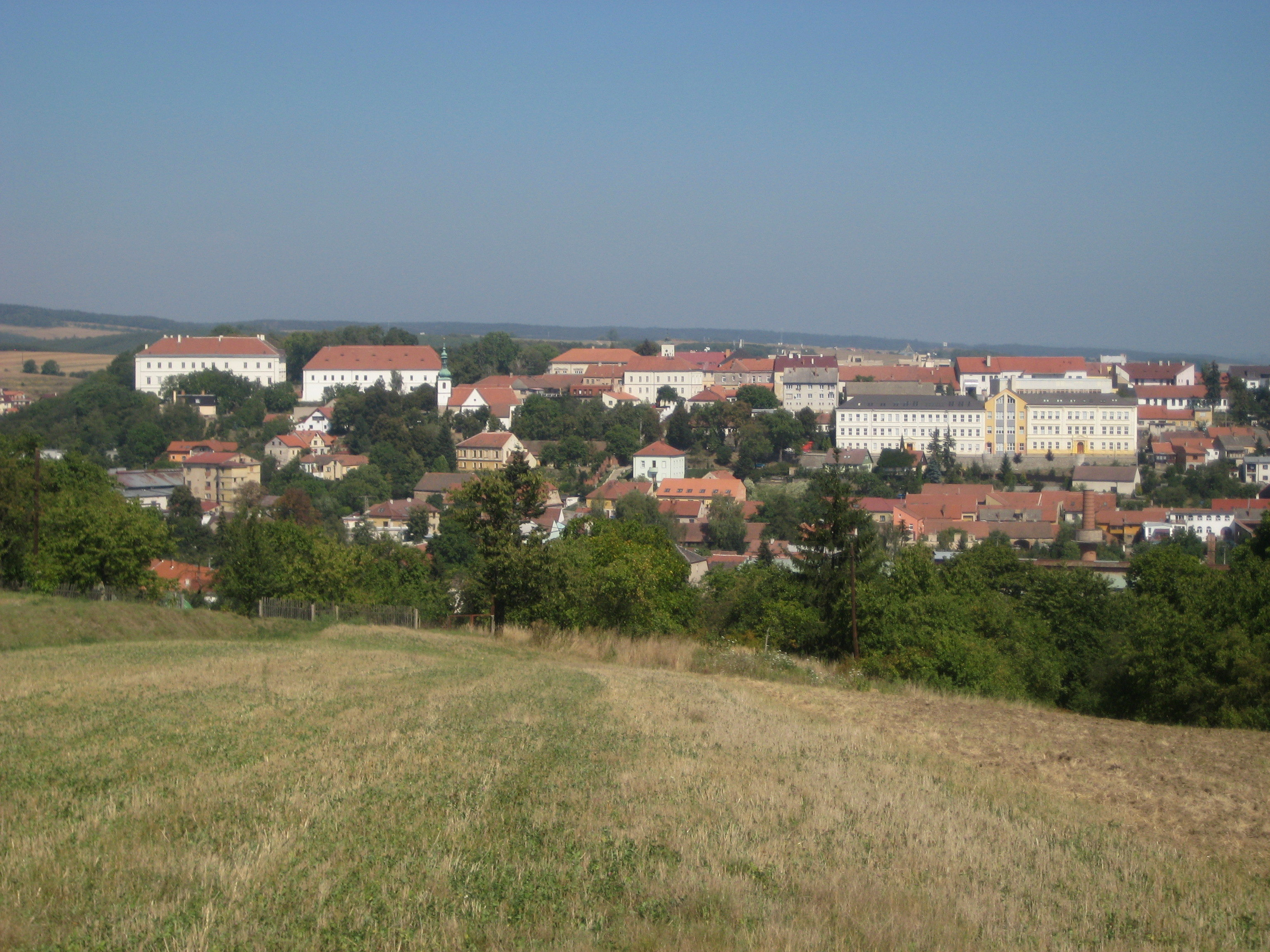
- View from the south

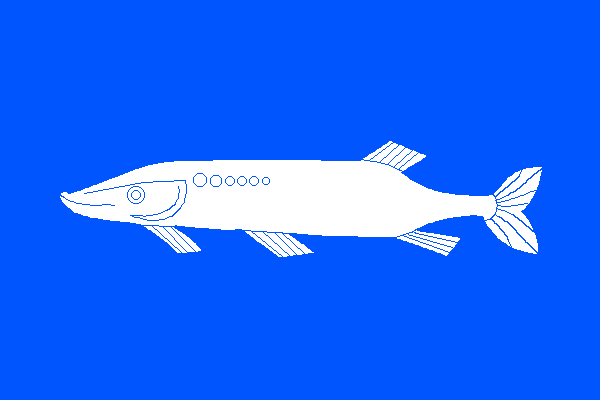
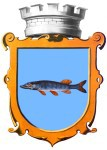
- Flag Coat of arms

- Location in the Czech Republic
- Coordinates: 49°10′56″N 16°23′16″E
- Country: Czech Republic
- Region: South Moravian
- District: Brno-Country
- First mentioned: 1259

Government
  - Mayor: Andrea Trojanová

Area
  - Total: 12.74 km^{2} (4.92 sq mi)
- Elevation: 326 m (1,070 ft)

Population (2026-01-01)
  - Total: 6,825
  - Density: 535.7/km^{2} (1,387/sq mi)
- Time zone: UTC+1 (CET)
  - Summer (DST): UTC+2 (CEST)
- Postal code: 665 01
- Website: www.rosice.cz

Rosice (Czech pronunciation: [ˈrosɪtsɛ]; German: Rossitz) is a town in Brno-Country District in the South Moravian Region of the Czech Republic. It has about 6,800 inhabitants.

== Geography ==
Rosice is located about 18 kilometres (11 mi) southwest of Brno. It lies mostly in the Boskovice Furrow valley. The northwestern part of the municipal territory extends into the Křižanov Highlands and includes the highest point of Rosice at 454 m (1,490 ft) above sea level. The Bobrava River flows through the town.

== History ==
The first written mention of Rosice is from 1259. The most prominent owners of the estate were the Zierotin family, who acquired it in 1562 and had built here a castle. In 1907, Rosice was promoted to a town by Franz Joseph I of Austria.

== Demographics ==
Historical population

Year	Pop.	±%
1869	3,676	—
1880	3,058	−16.8%
1890	3,055	−0.1%
1900	3,398	+11.2%
1910	3,817	+12.3%

Year	Pop.	±%
1921	4,109	+7.6%
1930	4,984	+21.3%
1950	4,634	−7.0%
1961	4,819	+4.0%
1970	4,396	−8.8%

Year	Pop.	±%
1980	4,978	+13.2%
1991	4,985	+0.1%
2001	5,296	+6.2%
2011	5,740	+8.4%
2021	6,600	+15.0%

Source: Censuses

== Transport ==
The D1 motorway from Prague to Brno runs northeast of Rosice, just outside the municipal territory. The I/23 road, which connects the D1 motorway with Třebíč, runs through the town.

Rosice is located on the railway line Brno–Třebíč.

== Sport ==
The local football club FC Slovan Rosice plays in the lower amateur tiers.

== Sights ==
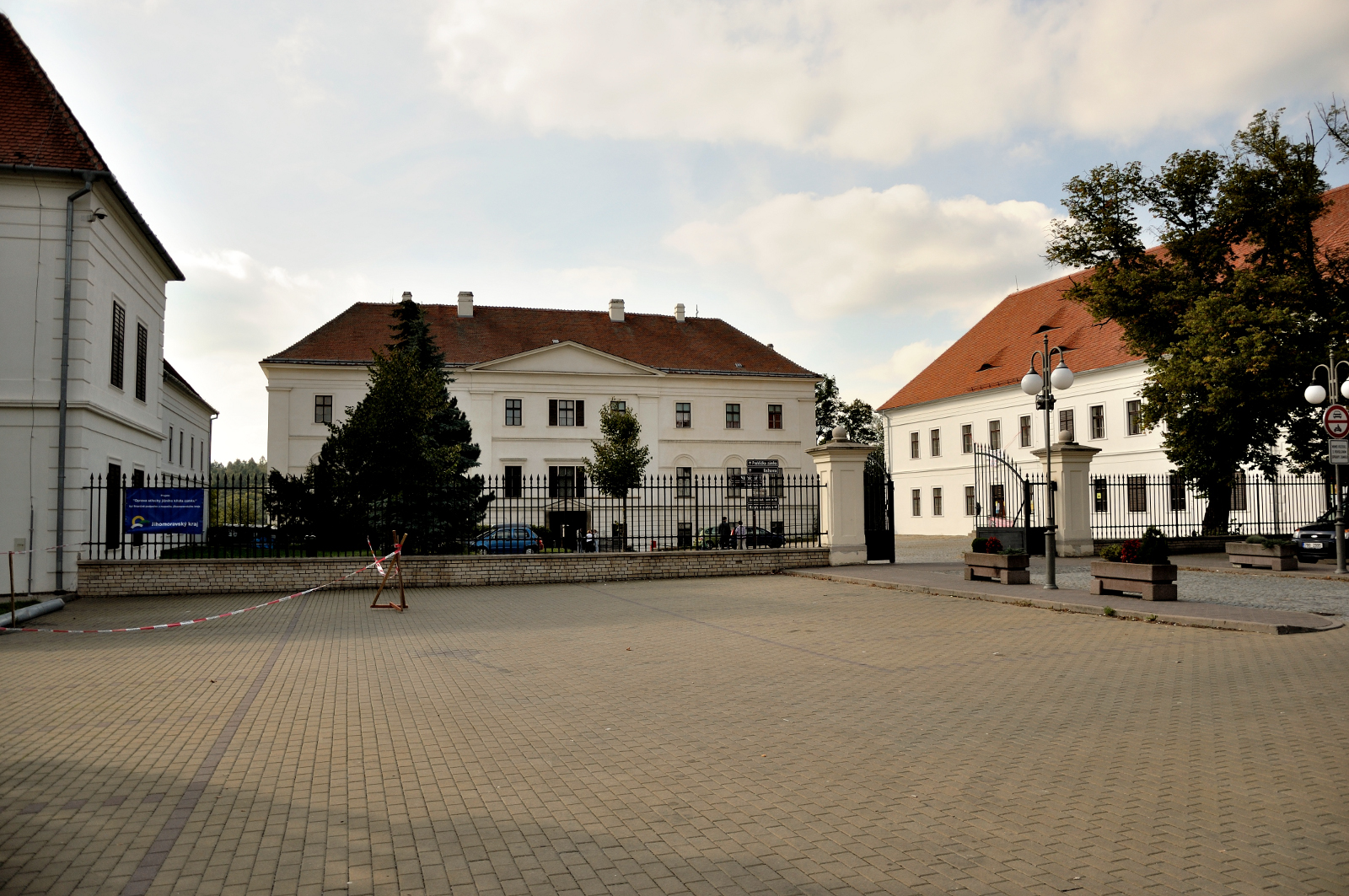
Rosice Castle

The main landmark of Rosice is the Rosice Castle. It was built in the Renaissance style in 1570–1579 and replaced a Gothic medieval castle from the 13th century. It is surrounded by a large park. Nowadays a part of the castle is open to the public and another part houses a library and a cultural centre.

The parish Church of Saint Martin is the oldest monument in Rosice. The Romanesque windows in its 34 metres (112 ft)-high tower indicate that the building dates probably from the 12th century. It was rebuilt several times. It has one Gothic and one Renaissance chapel. The interior has its current look since the 18th century.

== Notable people ==
- Zdeněk Bobrovský (1933–2014), basketball player
- Jan Bobrovský (born 1945), basketball player and coach
- Ladislav Krejčí (born 1999), footballer

== Twin towns – sister cities ==
Rosice is twinned with:

- Lainate, Italy
- Rimóc, Hungary
- Strenči, Latvia
