= Geology of Lithuania =

The geology of Lithuania consists of ancient Proterozoic basement rock overlain by thick sequences of Paleozoic, Mesozoic and Cenozoic marine sedimentary rocks, with some oil reserves, abundant limestone, dolomite, phosphorite and glauconite. Lithuania is a country in the Baltic region of northern-eastern Europe.

== Geologic history, stratigraphy and tectonics ==
The basement rock of Lithuania is made up of the West Lithuanian Granitic Massif aluminous schist, metabasic rocks (reaching granulite grade on the sequence of metamorphic facies) and gneiss and the Southeast Lithuanian Zone granitoids, plagiomicrocline granite and migmatite. The massif has some notable Mesoproterozoic dike swarms. In the southeast, granitoids alternate with metagraywacke, amphibolite and rare dolomite marble, mica-schist. Metamorphic rocks typically reach amphibolite facies and ultramafic or mafic intrusions are common.

An angular unconformity separates weathered basement rock from the Merkys Formation fanglomerates, formed in the Neoproterozoic. Salica Formation arkose and siltstone overlies these units, overlain in the east by the Kieva Formation with siltstone, clay and sandstone. Sedimentary rocks up to 2.3 kilometers thick define the entire Phanerozoic rock record.

=== Paleozoic (539–251 million years ago) ===
Dark green clay with sandstone and siltstone interbeds, together up to 40 meters thick, overlies Vendian age rocks, defining the Lower Cambrian and the start of the Paleozoic. It is overlain by the Lontova Stage clays. The Vergale Stage has an angular unconformity with basement rocks in the east and contains brown oolitic ironstone, sandstone, siltstone and argillite up to 45 meters thick with the 42 meter Rausve Stage sandstone and siltstone above it.

The mid-Cambrian Kybartai Stage sits above the Rausve Stage with abundant glauconite and is overlain in the west by the 67 meters of clay in the Deimena Stage or the Paneriai Stage argillite and sandstone in the east.

Ordovician rocks include numerous limestone and marl sequences in the Kunda, Aseri, Lasnamae, Uhaku, Idavere, Johvi, Keila, Rakvere, Nabala, Vormsi, Pirgu and Porkuni stages. Juuru Stage microcrystalline nodular limestone and red marl from the Silurian transgressively overlies Ordovician rocks, ascending through a sequence that includes the Raikkula, Adavere, Jaani, Jaagarahu, Siesartis, Dubysa, Pagegiai, Minija and Jura stage rocks, which include argillite, dolomite, marl, clay and other basin sediments.

The early Devonian Tilzee and Stoniskiai Stage rocks are disconformably overlain by the Kemeri Stage with clays and siltstones up to 170 meters thick. This is in-turn overlain disconformably by the Rezekne Stage. Other units include the Parnu, Narva, Arukula, Burtnieki, Sventoji, Dubnik, Katleski, Pamusis, Stipinai, Amula, Kruoja, Siauliai, Joniski, Kursa, Akmene, Muri, Svete, Zagare and Ketleri stages. Sandstone, siltstone and dolomitic marl of the Letiza Formation up to 20 meters thick marks the beginning of the Carboniferous, overlain by 16 meters of Paplaka Formation dolomite and 50 meters of Nica Formation sandstones, sands and siltstones. Basal conglomerates begin the Werra Stage sequence from the Permian, which ascends into siltstone, limestone, marl, gypsum and anhydrite up to 170 meters thick. The very thin (no more than eight meters) Strassfurt Stage is the final Paleozoic unit in Lithuania.

=== Mesozoic (251–66 million years ago) ===
The Nemunas Formation is the oldest Mesozoic formation, from the Triassic, overlying Permian, Carboniferous, Neoproterozoic and Devonian rocks with clay, argillite, marl and siltstone up to 131 meters thick. It is conformably overlain by the clay, argillite and sandstones of the Palanga Formation up to 776 meters thick, the 54 meter Taurage Formation oolitic limestones, marl and clay, and the reddish clays with sandstone-siltstone layers of the Sarkuva Formation. The Upper Triassic is marked by the Nida Formation, which lies disconformably on older Triassic rocks with 15 meters of sandstone, siltstone and clay.

Basal conglomerate marks the beginning of the Lower Jurassic Neringa Formation with 33 meters of sandstone and clay, with the 45 meter siltstones, clay and sandstone of the Lave Formation. The Middle Jurassic Isrutis Formation overlies both Triassic rocks and the Lava Formation with black sands 100 meters thick. Seventy meters of the Liepona Formation calcareous sandstones and gray clays lies above both the Lava and Isrutis formations. The Papile Formation is associated with the Callovian time period and includes marl, limestone, sandstone, sands, siderite and clay. Late Jurassic Oxfordian, Kimmeridgian and Volgian rocks 68, 36 and 20 meters thick lie above these units with approximately the same sedimentary makeup. Sixteen meters of deltaic sands and siltstones known as the Uzupiai Formation mark the beginning of the Cretaceous, while 53 meters of glauconite sand in the Jiesia Formation have an angular unconformity with Jurassic and Silurian rocks.

A basal phosphorite layer indicates a return to deposition after a disconformity between older Cretaceous rocks and Cenomanian sequences, which also include sand, silt, chalky marl and limestone. Chalk and chert nodules are defining sedimentary features of 48 meter Turonian, 79 meter Coniacian and 40 meter Santonian age rocks.

=== Cenozoic (66 million years ago – present) ===
The Liubava Formation from the Paleocene lies disconformably atop Maastrichtian age rocks and includes marl and glauconite silt 56 meters thick. It is overlain disconformably by the Eocene Alka Formation glauconite sands, silts and phosphorite up to 27 meters thick. The Prusai Formation with 10 to 12 meter thick amber, phosphorite and glauconite silts overlies both units. Carbonaceous sands with layers of silt and clay up to 18 meters thick deposited during the Miocene. There are also Pliocene beds of sand, silt and clay up to 14 meters thick and the Anyksciai Formation, made up of 10 meters of quartz sandstone, sand, silt and clay.

== Natural resource geology ==
In the 1990s, 38 million cubic meters of raw materials were mined in Lithuania every year and 1.3 million cubic meters of groundwater were pumped to the surface. Chalk, limestone and dolomite are abundant and widely used for construction. Iron ore and anhydrite are known from the Precambrian basement, but have not been exploited. Cambrian and Silurian rocks hold about 100 million tons of oil. Quaternary gravel, Neogene glass-grade sand, Devonian gypsum and Paleogene amber are also extracted.
