= Strenči =

Town in Valmiera Municipality, Latvia

- Town
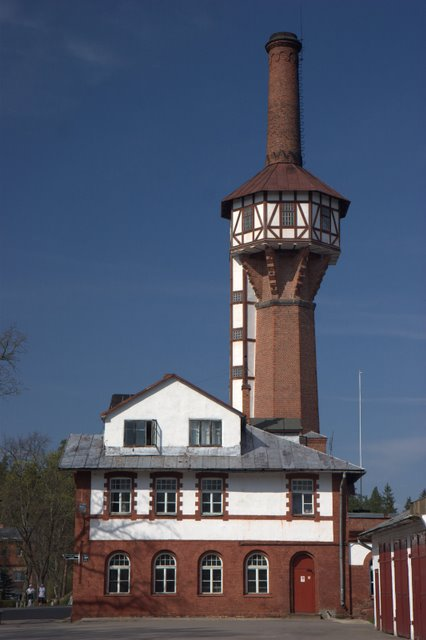
- Strenči Psychoneurological Hospital

- Coat of arms

- Location in Latvia
- Coordinates: 57°37′N 25°41′E
- Country: Latvia
- Municipality: Valmiera Municipality
- Town rights: 1928

Government
  - Head of the Strenči Association: Jānis Pētersons

Area
  - Total: 5.72 km^{2} (2.21 sq mi)
  - Land: 5.39 km^{2} (2.08 sq mi)
  - Water: 0.33 km^{2} (0.13 sq mi)
- Elevation: 45 m (148 ft)

Population (2026)
  - Total: 968
  - Density: 180/km^{2} (465/sq mi)
- Time zone: UTC+2 (EET)
  - Summer (DST): UTC+3 (EEST)
- Postal code: LV-4730
- Calling code: +371 647
- Website: http://www.strenci.lv/

Strenči (pronounced [ˈstrentʃi]; German: Stackeln) is a town in Valmiera Municipality in the Vidzeme region of Latvia. It is located about 130 km (81 mi) northeast of Riga, about 20 km (12 mi) northeast of Valmiera and about 30 km (19 mi) southwest of Valka.

Strenči is known as the raftsmen capital of Latvia, due to the town's location on the Gauja river and historical role in timber rafting. It is also widely known in Latvia for its psychiatric hospital, "Strenču psihoneiroloģiskā slimnīca, VSIA" which was built in 1907 on the initiative of the Livonian Knighthood.

Strenči is bordered by the North Vidzeme Biosphere Reserve.

== Twin towns — sister cities ==
Strenči is twinned with:

- Lainate, Italy
- Rimóc, Hungary
- Rosice, Czech Republic
- Sayda, Germany

== See also ==
- List of cities in Latvia
