= Skaistgirys =

- Town
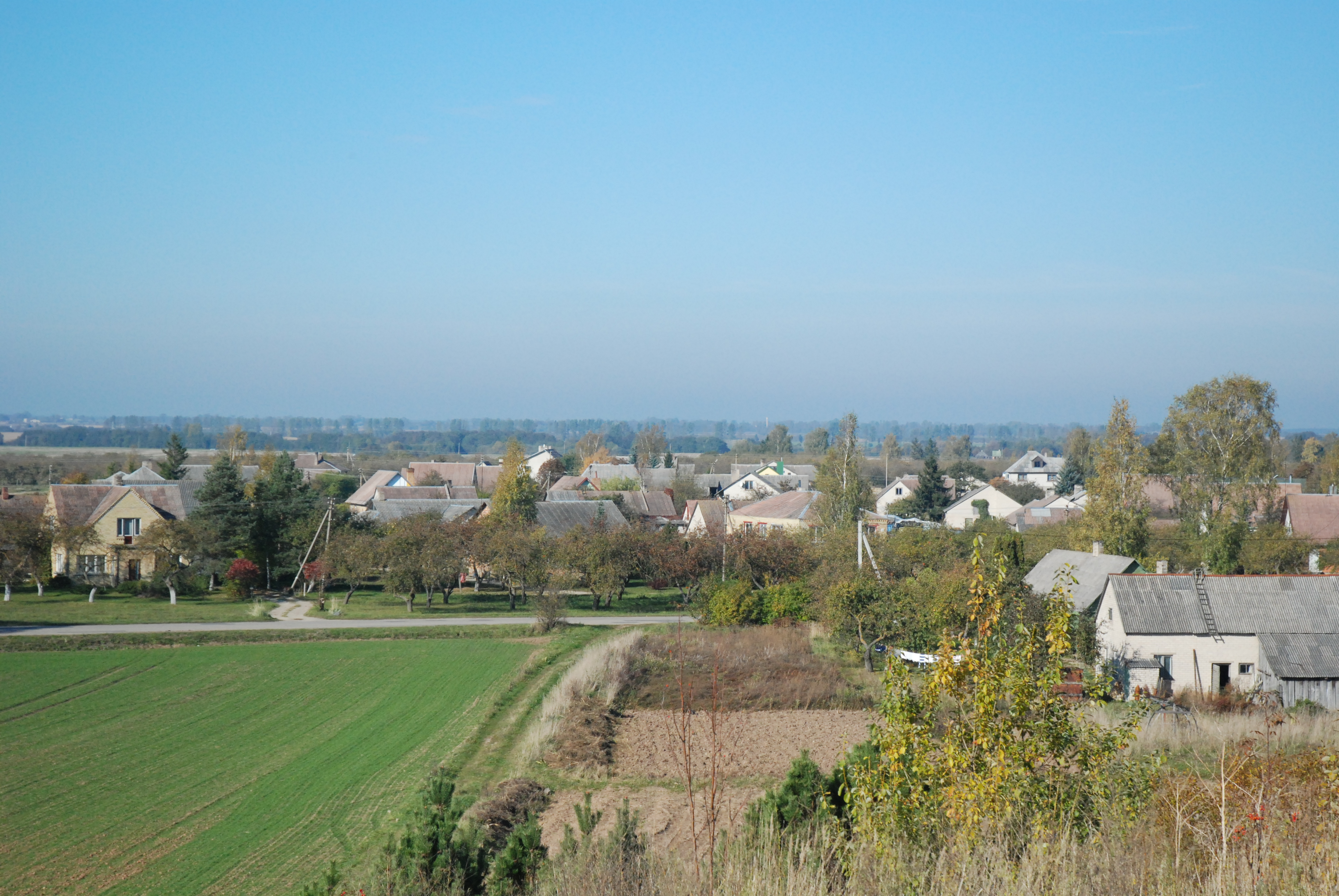

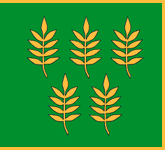
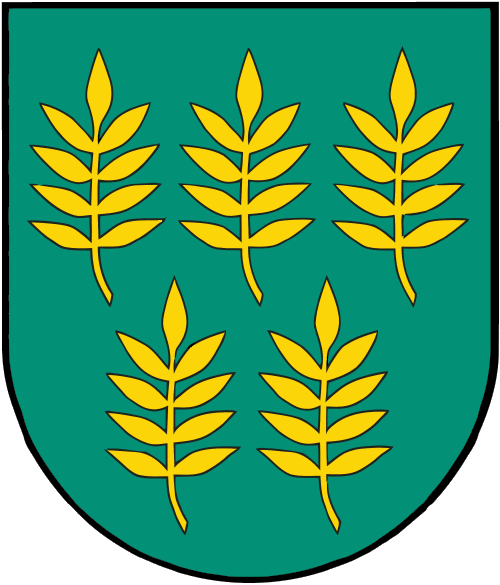
- Flag Coat of arms

- Location in Lithuania
- Coordinates: 56°18′30″N 23°23′0″E
- Country: Lithuania
- Ethnographic region: Samogitia
- County: Šiauliai County

Population (2011)
  - Total: 862
- Time zone: UTC+2 (EET)
  - Summer (DST): UTC+3 (EEST)

Skaistgirys is a small town in Šiauliai County in northern-central Lithuania. As of 2011 it had a population of 862. It lies on the road to District 153-Žagarė - Naujoji Akmenė.

== Facilities ==
The town hosts St. George's Church (1827), a park with a stage for summer theater and parish feasts, a secondary school, pharmacy, post office, clinic, recreation center, park, public library and a kindergarten.

First mentioned in the year 1426. Skaistgirys' first church was built in about 1714. In Soviet times, the town was "Victory" collective farm. It was the first village type settlement in Lithuania handled according to district layout scheme. 1965 it was given the title of best-managed settlement (a competition organized by the newspaper) Tiesa ("Truth")). At the same time a collective farm cultural center and public museum were established. In 2005 the Skaistgirys coat of arms was finalized.

== Origin of the name ==
The name of the town comes from the word bright (Lith. skaistus, šviesus) + praise or "big forest" (Lith. giria or girti). The name comes from the beautiful pine forest, which grew in on the site of the present church and that was called Luminance Forest. Until 1930, the official form was Skaisgirys later - Skaisgiris, and in the second half of the twentieth century became Skaistgirys.

== Geography ==
On the west side of the town flows Vilkija creek. Vilkija hydrological reserve is there. The town is famous for dolomite, Uolynas Hill and a clean water quarry.

== History ==
The park was formed in 1963 a park of 10 hectares of land, amphitheater and summer stage. It was the first township kind park in the republic. In 1965 people of Skaistgirys were awarded for a beautiful environment.
