= Rimóc =

- Village (község)
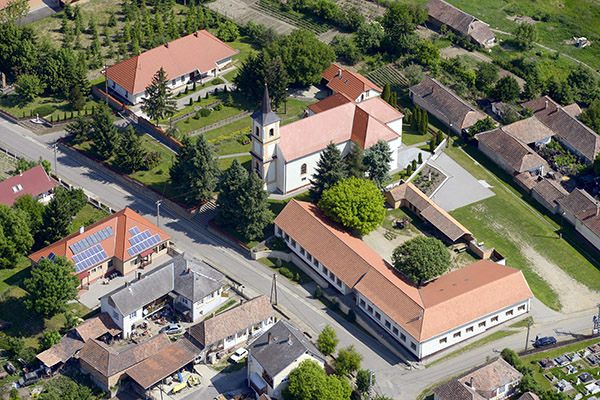
- Aerial view

- Coat of arms

- Location of Szécsénke in Hungary
- Coordinates: 48°02′16″N 19°31′47″E
- Country: Hungary
- Region: Northern Hungary
- County: Nógrád County
- Subregion: Szécsény

Government
  - Mayor: Vilmos Szabó (Ind.)

Area
  - Total: 29.26 km^{2} (11.30 sq mi)

Population (1 Jan. 2015)
  - Total: 1,844
  - Density: 63/km^{2} (160/sq mi)
- Time zone: UTC+1 (CET)
  - Summer (DST): UTC+2 (CEST)
- Postal code: 3177
- Area code: 32
- Website: http://rimoc.hu/

Rimóc is a village in Nógrád County, Northern Hungary Region, Hungary. Its population was 1 757 as of a 2012 census.
