= Joniškis District Municipality =

Joniškis District Municipality Joniškio rajono savivaldybė
- District Municipality
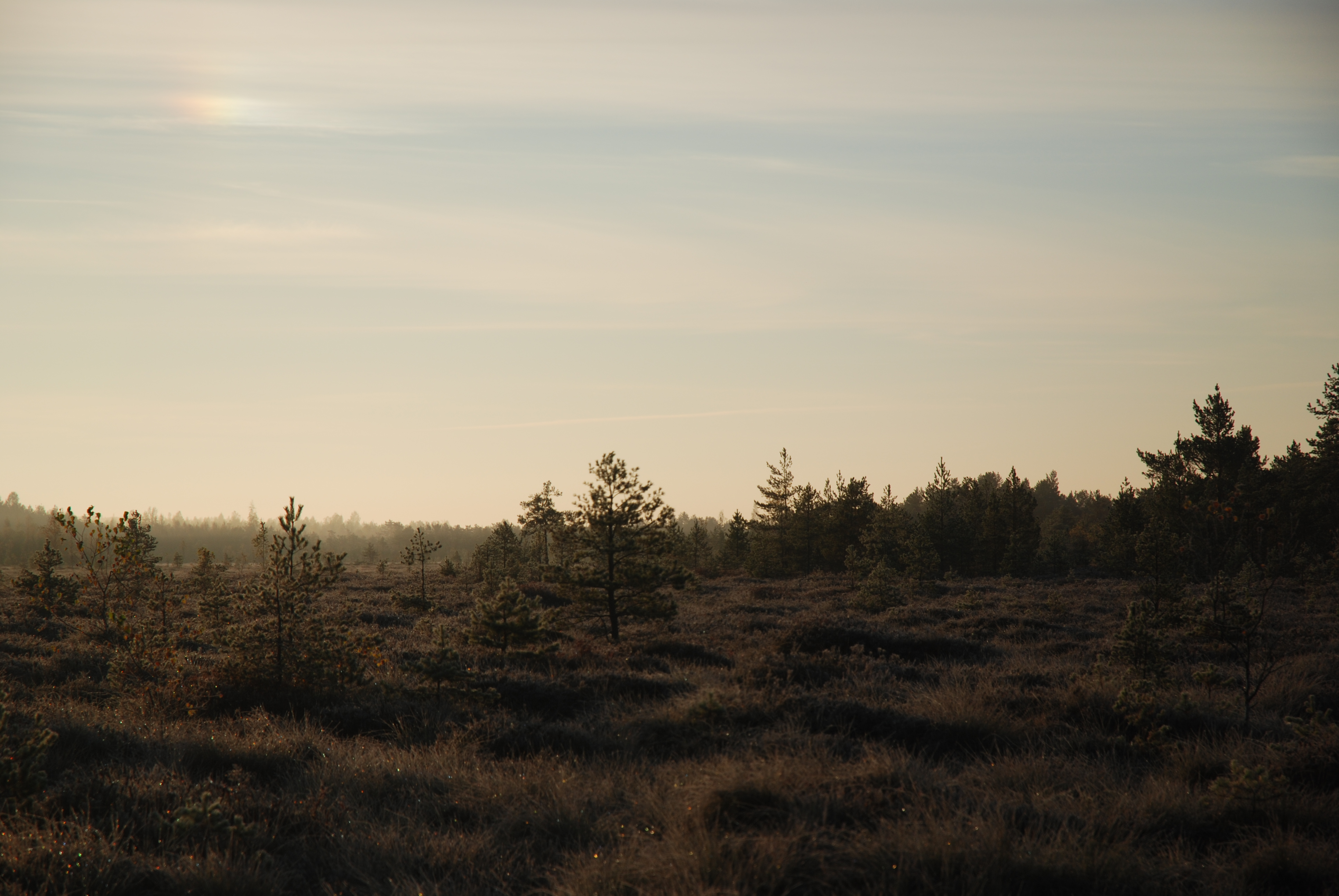
- Morning in Mūša Upland Bog

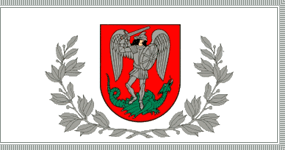
- Flag Coat of arms

- Location of Joniškis District Municipality within Lithuania

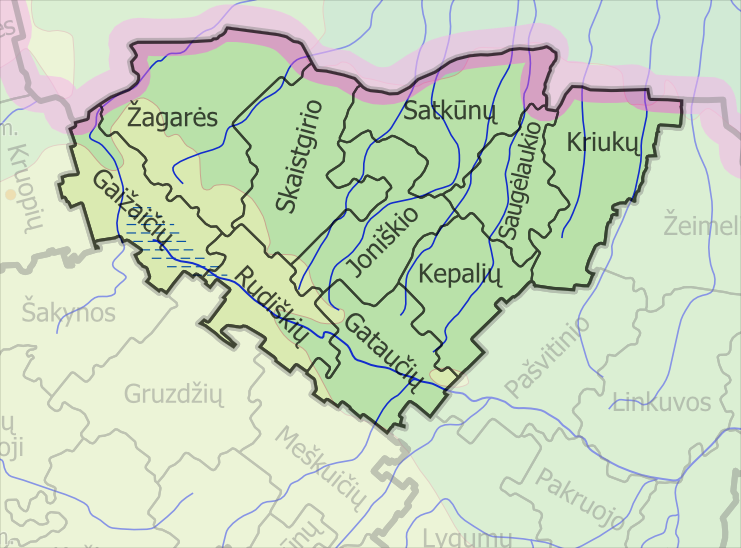
- Location of Joniškis
- Coordinates: 56°14′28″N 23°36′55″E
- Country: Lithuania
- Region: Aukštaitija
- County: Šiauliai County
- Established: 1950 (76 years ago)
- Capital: Joniškis
- Elderships: 10

Government
  - Type: City Council
  - Body: Joniškis District Council
  - Mayor: Vitalijus Gailius (LRLS)
  - Leading: Liberal Movement 11 / 25

Area
  - Total: 1,151 km^{2} (444 sq mi)
  - Rank: 34th
- Elevation: 95 m (312 ft)

Population (2022)
  - Total: 20,708
  - Rank: 41st
  - Density: 17.99/km^{2} (46.6/sq mi)
  - Rank: 41st
- Time zone: UTC+2 (EET)
  - Summer (DST): UTC+3 (EEST)
- ZIP Codes: 84001–84446
- Phone code: +370 (426)
- Website: www.joniskis.lt

Joniškis District Municipality (Joniškio rajono savivaldybė) is a territorial unit of Lithuania with a population of about 30,000. The administrative center of the municipality is the city of Joniškis.

== Elderships ==
Joniškis District Municipality is divided into 10 elderships:

Eldership (Administrative Center)	Area	Population (2021)
Gaižaičiai (Gaižaičiai)	108 km^{2} (26,687.38 acres; 41.70 sq mi)	352
Gataučiai (Gataučiai)	105 km^{2} (25,946.07 acres; 40.54 sq mi)	1,261
Joniškis (Joniškis)	106 km^{2} (26,193.17 acres; 40.93 sq mi)	10,011
Kepaliai (Kirnaičiai)	87.7 km^{2} (21,671.14 acres; 33.86 sq mi)	1,416
Kriukai (Kriukai)	134 km^{2} (33,112.12 acres; 51.74 sq mi)	1,088
Rudiškiai (Rudiškiai)	59.9 km^{2} (14,801.61 acres; 23.13 sq mi)	583
Satkūnai (Satkūnai)	100 km^{2} (24,710.54 acres; 38.61 sq mi)	1,043
Saugėlaukis (Bariūnai)	70.6 km^{2} (17,445.64 acres; 27.26 sq mi)	1,104
Skaistgirys (Skaistgirys)	136 km^{2} (33,606.33 acres; 52.51 sq mi)	1,901
Žagarė (Žagarė)	181 km^{2} (44,726.07 acres; 69.88 sq mi)	2,525
