= Andriake Synagogue =

Ancient synagogue in Lycia, Turkey

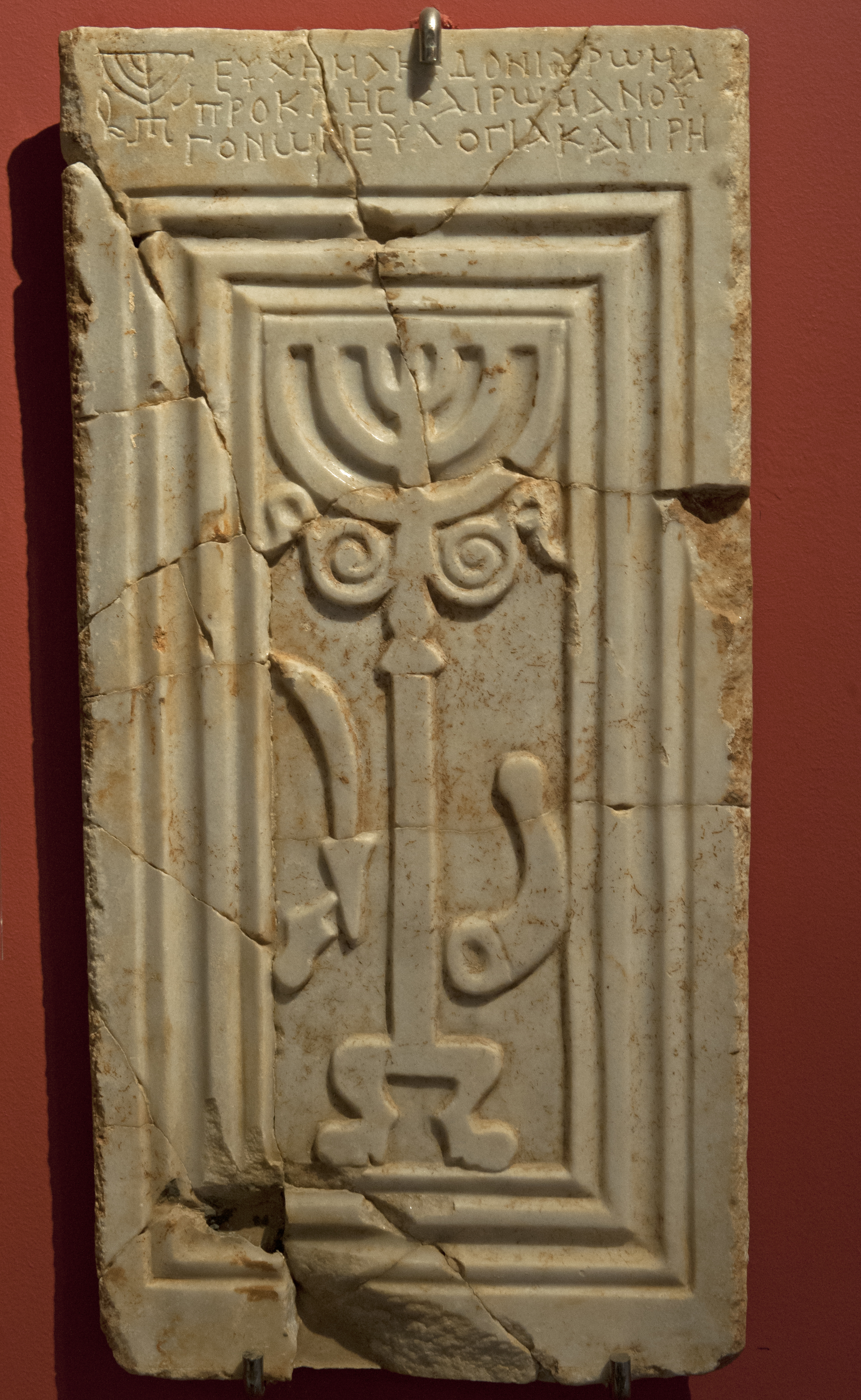
- A menorah plaque from the former synagogue

- Location of the former synagogue ruins in modern-day Turkey

Religion
- Affiliation: Judaism (former)
- Ecclesiastical or organizational status: Synagogue (ruins)
- Status: Archaeological site

Location
- Location: Andriake, Demre
- Country: Turkey
- Interactive map of Andriake Synagogue
- Coordinates: 36°14′50″N 29°58′58″E

Architecture
- Type: Synagogue architecture
- Style: Roman architecture
- Completed: 3rd century CE
- Materials: Stone

The Andriake Synagogue is a former ancient Jewish synagogue, that was discovered in Andriake, an ancient city in the historical region of Lycia, in Asia Minor. The building, that is now an archaeological site, was found in the town of Demre in the Antalya province, on the southwestern tip of modern-day Turkey.

The synagogue is placed on a hilltop overlooking Andriake's harbor. The site is located in the former major port city of Myra, which was the capital of the Lycian civilization.

== Discovery and findings ==
The synagogue was discovered in 2009 by Dr. Nevzat Çevik's team of archeologists from Akdeniz University. It is the first archaeological finding of Jewish culture in Lycia. As of 2010, a total of 282 objects were uncovered in the synagogue. Most of these objects were Hellenistic pottery, but the findings also included objects like a marble tablet featuring a menorah flanked by a Shofar and a bugle on one side and a palm tree and lemon tree on the other, and a 4th-century oil lamp. The stonework and carvings found in the building included a menorah and the words "Israel" and "Amen".

After the site was cleaned, it was discovered that apart from the apse, very little of the walls survived and the flooring was damaged. Many finds were discovered on the floor of the apse, mostly from the Hellenistic and Roman periods but not later than the Early Byzantine period.

== History and architecture ==
The Akdeniz University team believes the temple is from around the third century. It is thought that the synagogue was abandoned shortly after the panels of the chancel screen fell in front of the apse.

The building had a rectangular main hall, measuring 7.25 by 5.08 m (23.8 by 16.7 ft), which was connected to two rooms adjoining on the south/southwest. It had two entrances, one in the west and one in the north. It is believed that the Torah ark on the floor of the apse area was separated from the main area by a chancel screen. The apse area and the main hall were built at different times.

== See also ==
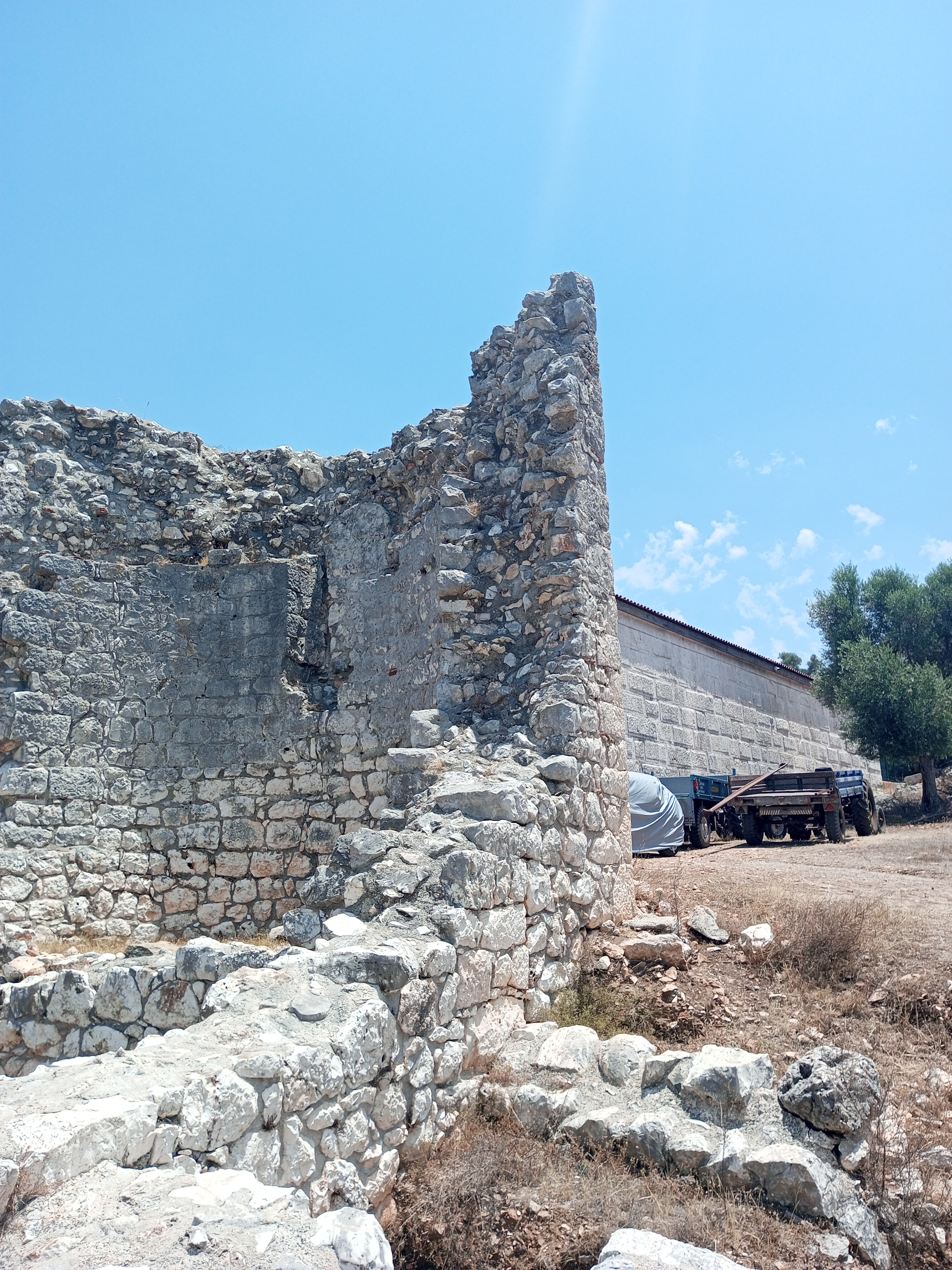
The apse of the synagogue

- History of the Jews in Turkey
- List of synagogues in Turkey
