= Giovanni Giacomo de Antiquis =

Italian composer

Giovanni Giacomo de Antiquis (fl. 1565 – c. 1608) was an Italian composer, choral conductor, voice teacher, and anthologist.

== Life and career ==
The year of Giovanni Giacomo de Antiquis's birth in the city of Corato, Italy is not known. The earliest record of the composer is as a cleric at the Basilica of Saint Nicholas, Bari in 1565. He eventually was made a canon and choirmaster at that cathedral. He joined the staff of the Conservatorio dei Poveri di Gesù Cristo, a music conservatory in Naples, where he was a voice teacher and a chaplain from 1606 through 1608. After this nothing is known about his whereabouts or death.

As a composer, Giovanni Giacomo de Antiquis mainly wrote choral music. Most of his surviving music is contained within two anthologies of music which he gathered and which were published in 1574: Il primo libro delle villanelle alla napolitana and Il secondo libro delle villanelle alla napolitana. Collectively, these two anthologies include thirteen villanelles by Antiquis which are written in 3-part vocal harmony. They also include music by 31 other composers. His published collections of canzonette (mainly duets) and madrigals (in four part vocal harmony) from 1584 are both lost. Some of his compositions are contained in Il primo libro a due voci de diversi autori di Bari (Venice 1585). He also published some instrumental bicinia and works for solo lute.
