= Andriake =

Ancient city in southwest Asia Minor

- Ἀνδριάκη (Ancient Greek)
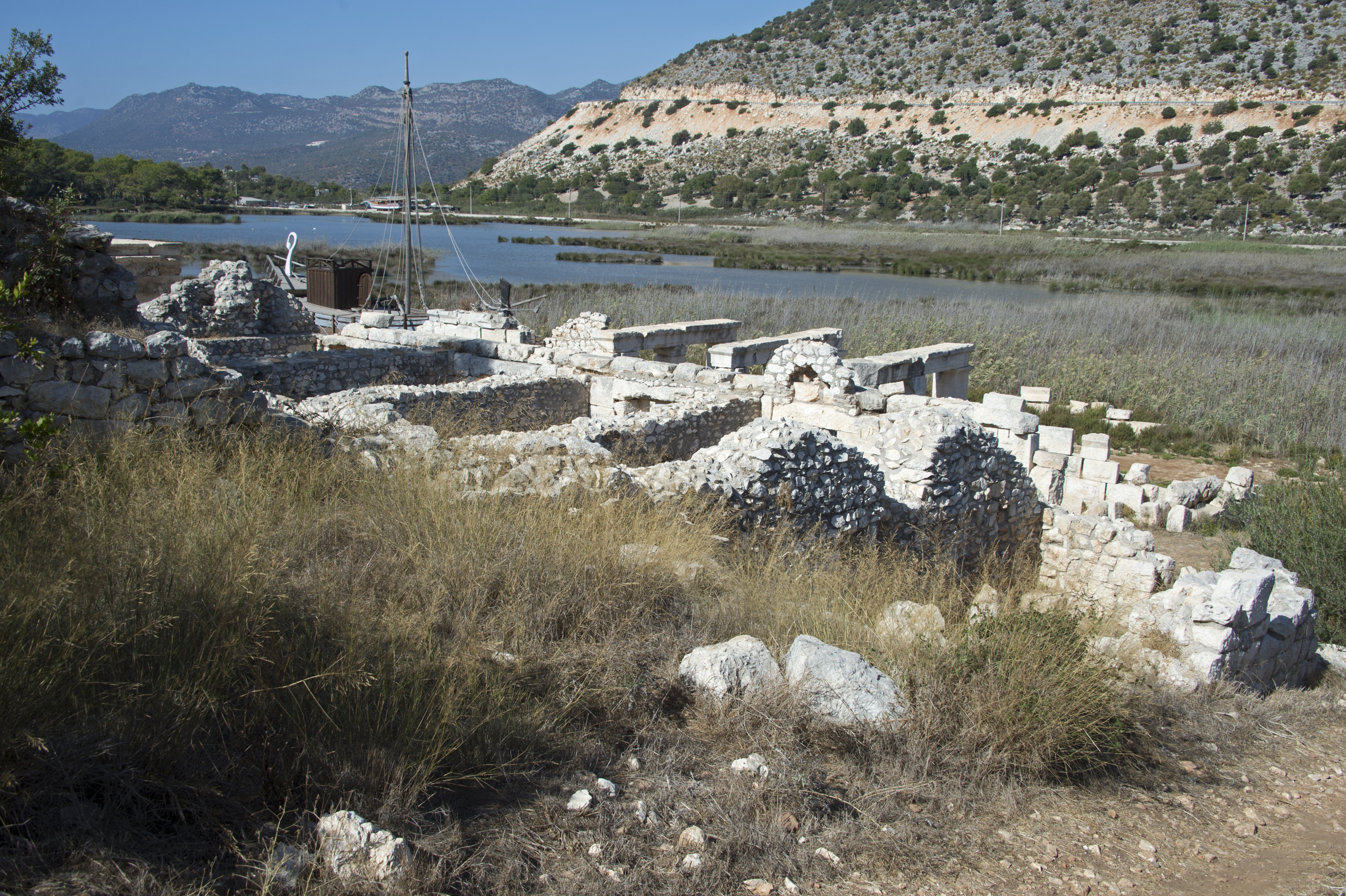
- Andriake Harbour area

- Location within Turkey
- 36°13′35″N 29°57′23″E
- Type: Ancient Settlement and port
- Location: Demre, Antalya Province, Turkey
- Region: Lycia

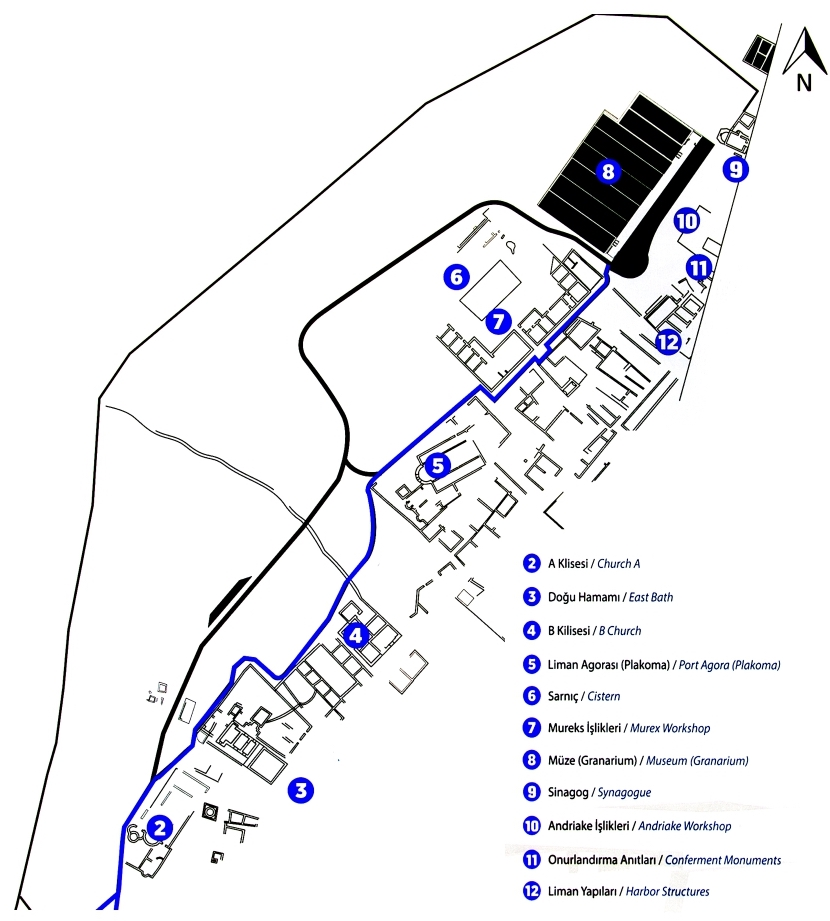
Andriake Plan

Andriake or Andriaca (Ancient Greek: Ἀνδριάκη) was an ancient city and the port of the ancient town of Myra in Lycia. It is in the modern Demre district of Antalya Province, in south-western Turkey.

The site has a museum.

== History ==
Andriake is mentioned by Ptolemy; and Pliny has Andriaca civitas, Myra (v. 27).

Appian (B.C. iv. 82) says that in 42 BC Lentulus was sent by Brutus to collect money and broke through the chain which defended the entrance to the port, and went up the river to Myra.

Beaufort (Karamania, p. 26) gives the name Andráki to the river of Myra.

Andriake is clearly the port on the small river on which Myra stood, 20 stadia higher up. (Strab. p. 666.) It must have been at Andriake, as Cramer observes, that St. Paul and his companion prisoners were put on board the Alexandrian ship sailing for Italy. (Acts, xxvii. 5, 6.)

== Site ==
On the north side of the entrance are the remains of large Roman horrea with an inscription which states that they were Hadrian's: the date is Hadrian's third consulate, 119 AD. There are ruins of churches and of a synagogue.

== Gallery ==
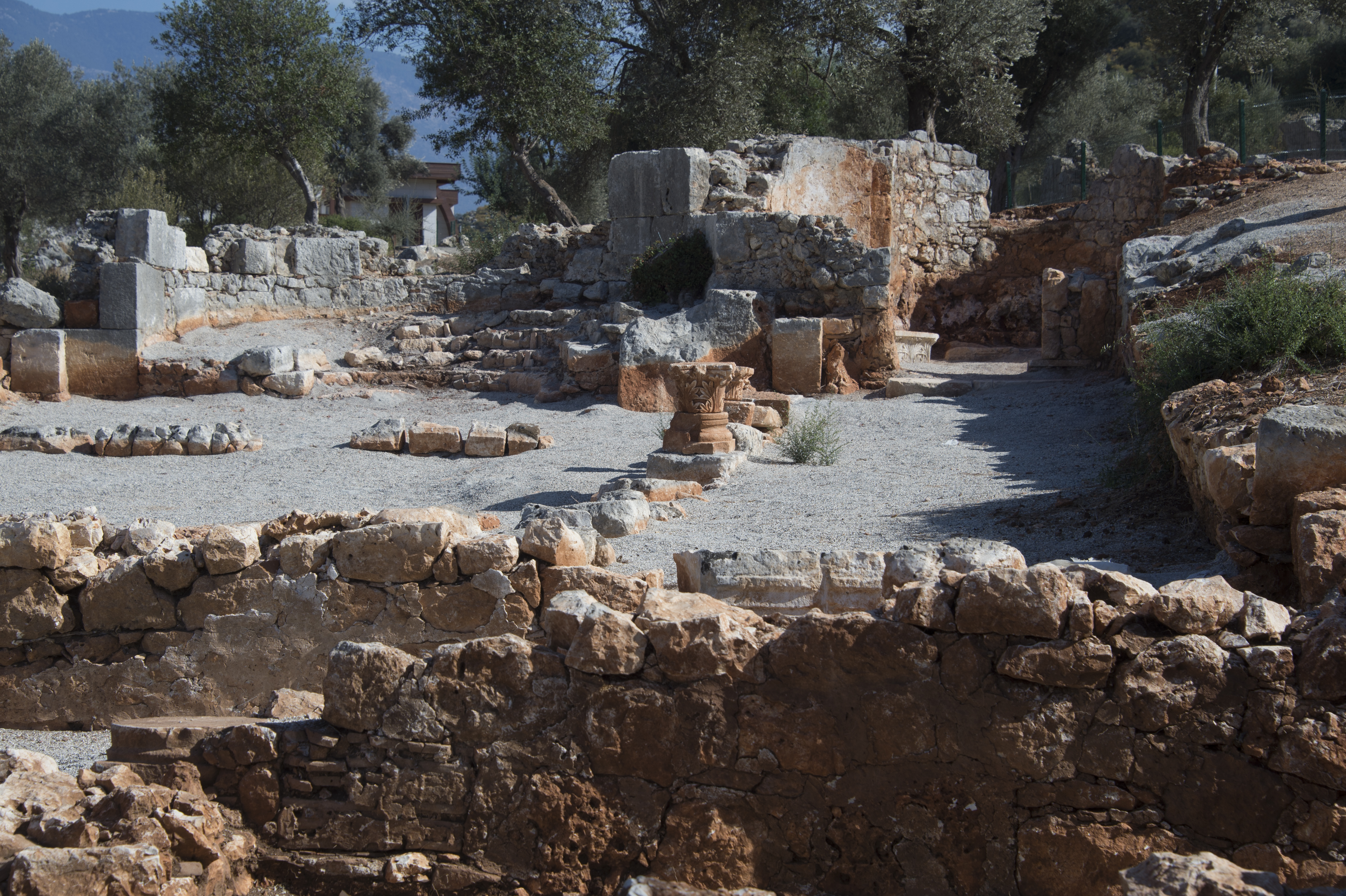
Andriake Church

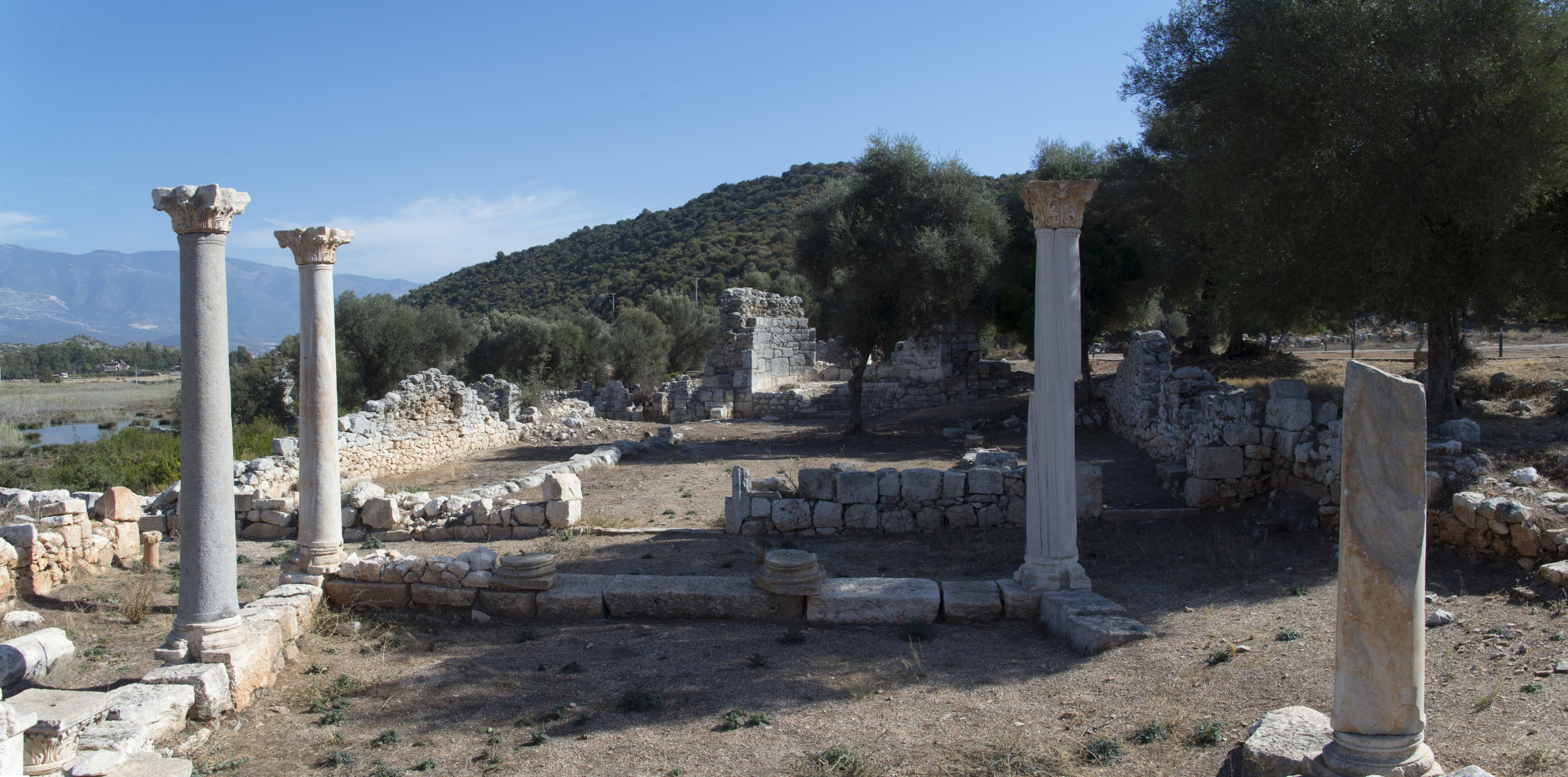
Andriake Church

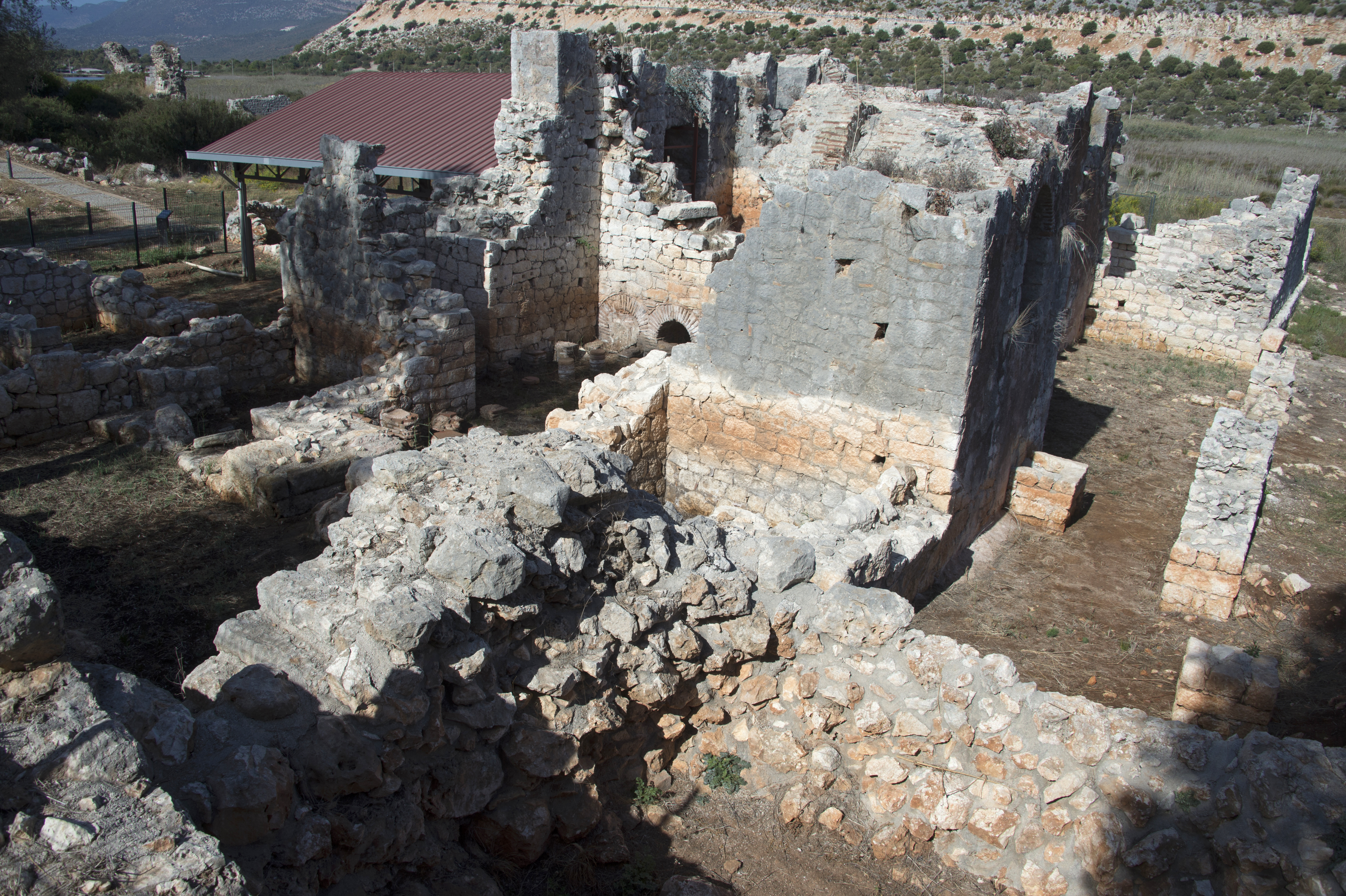
Andriake Eastern Bath

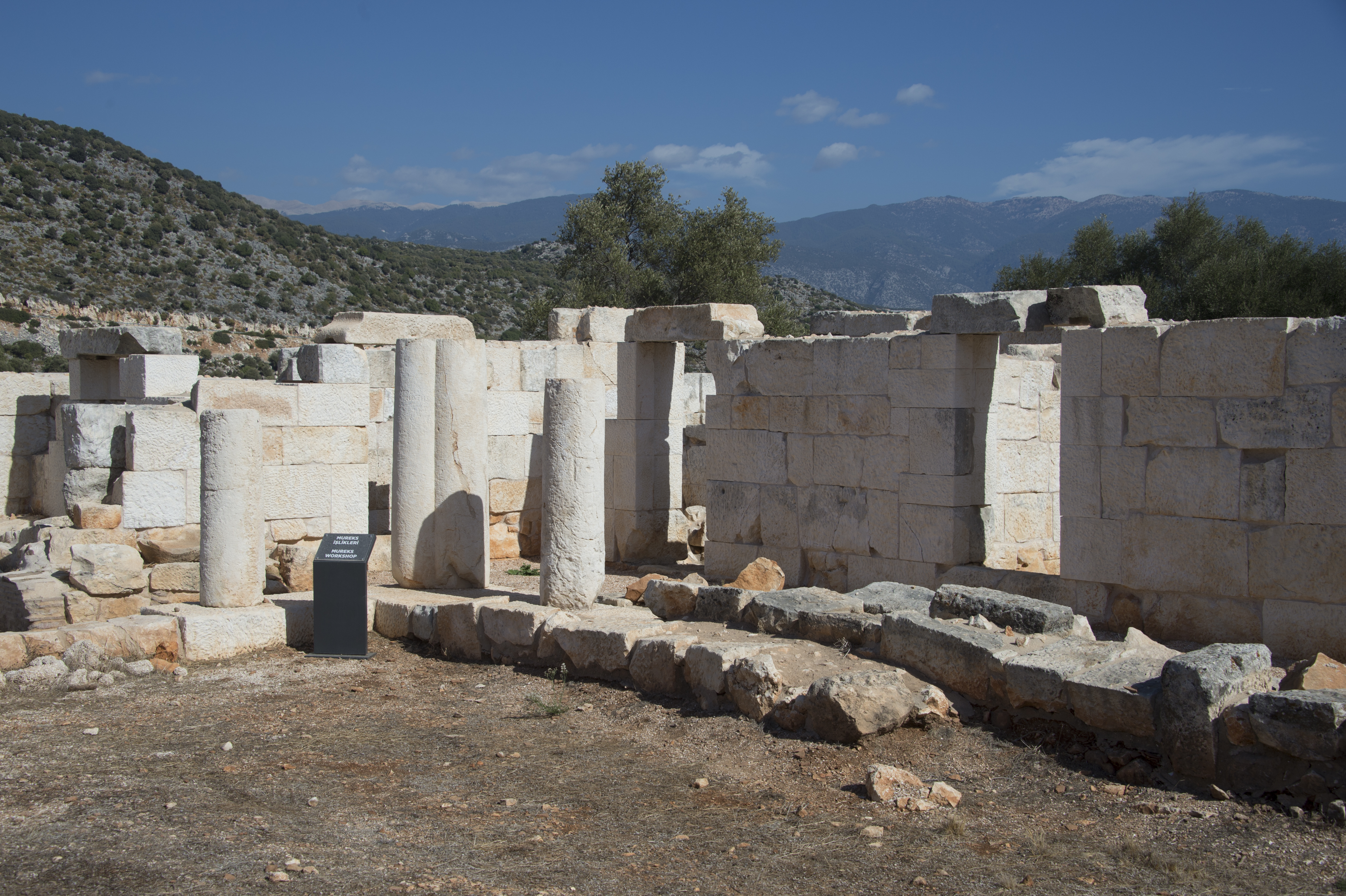
Andriake Harbour agora

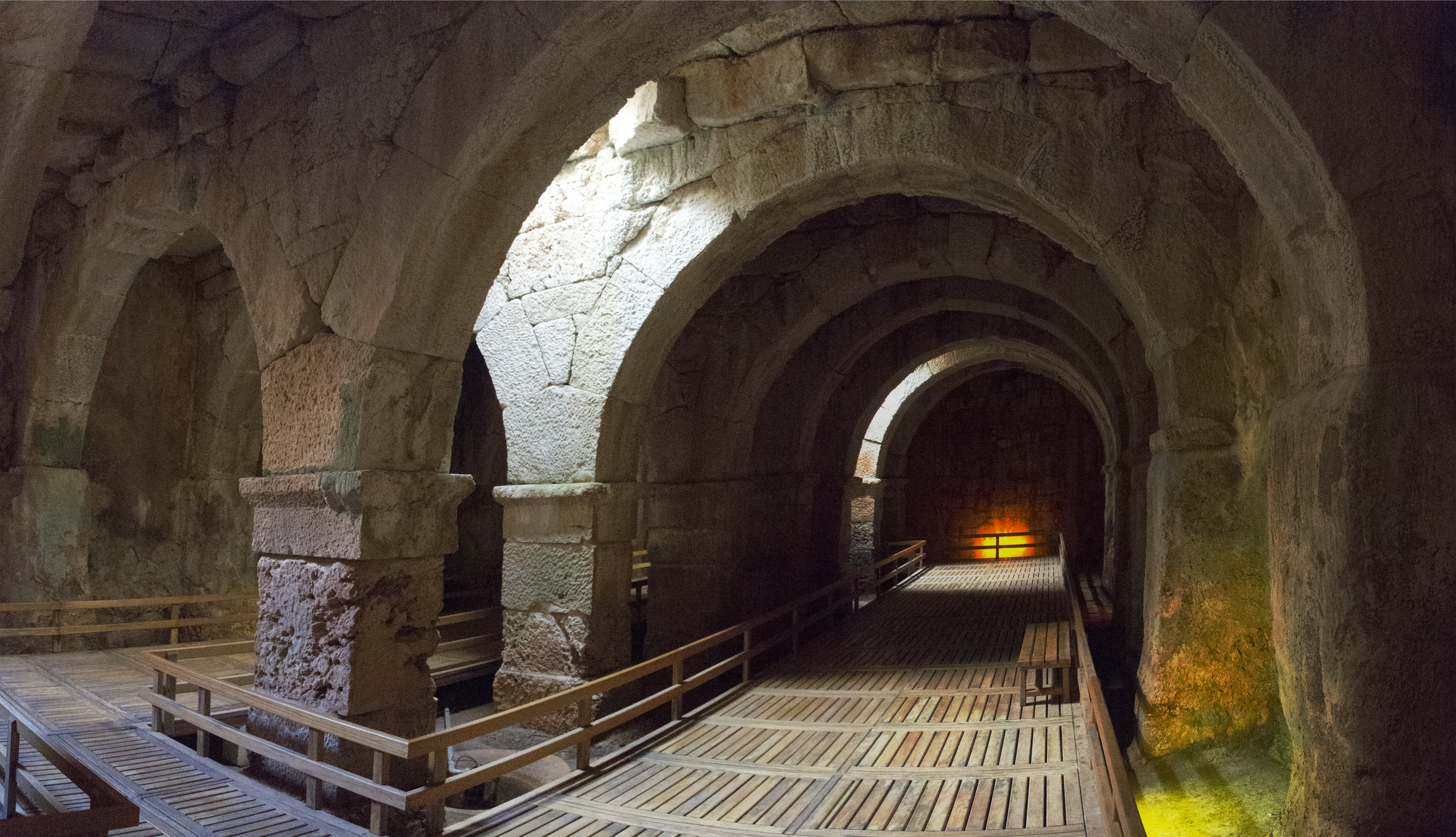
Andriake Harbour agora cistern

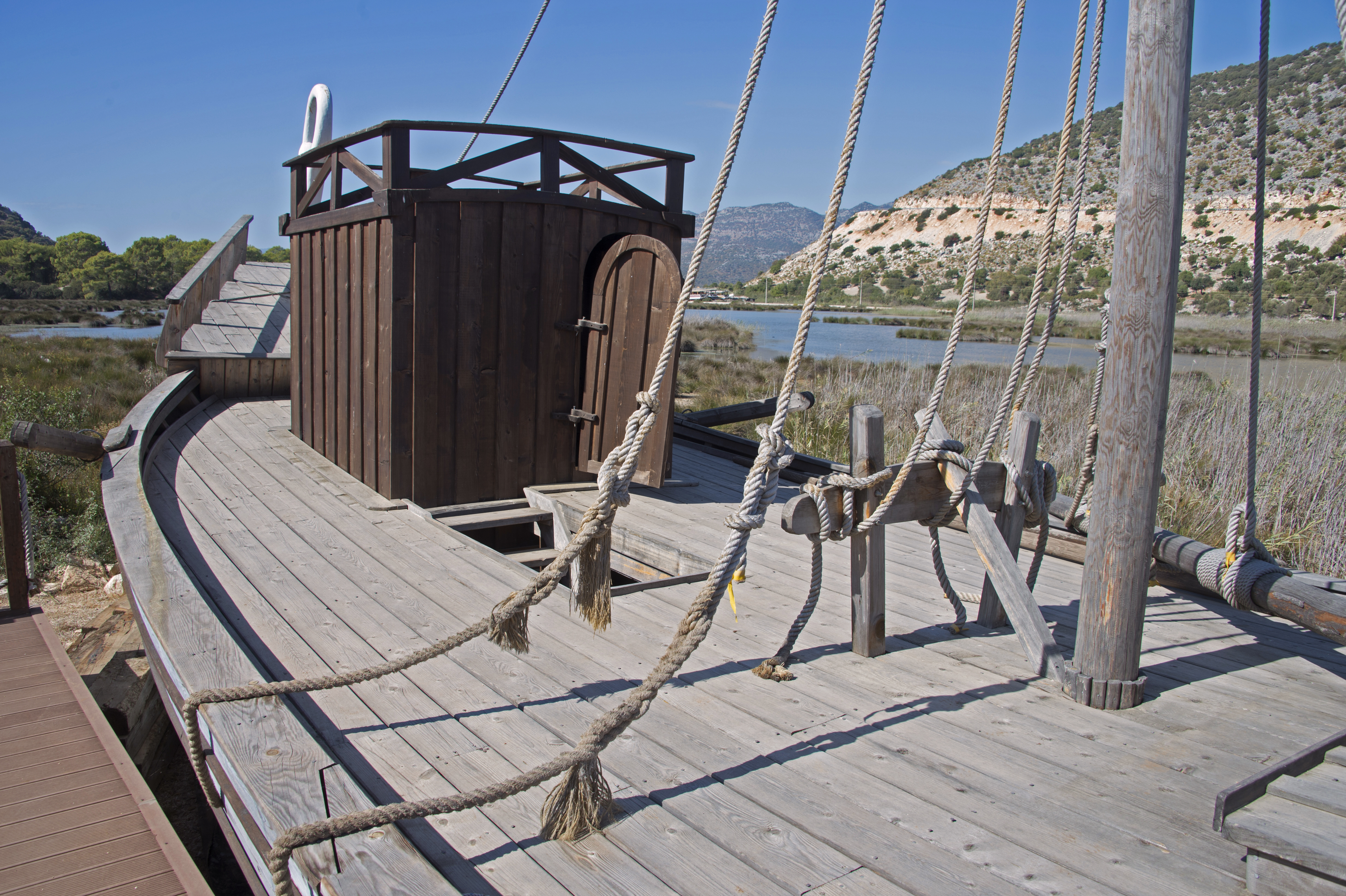
Andriake Harbour area Reconstructed ship

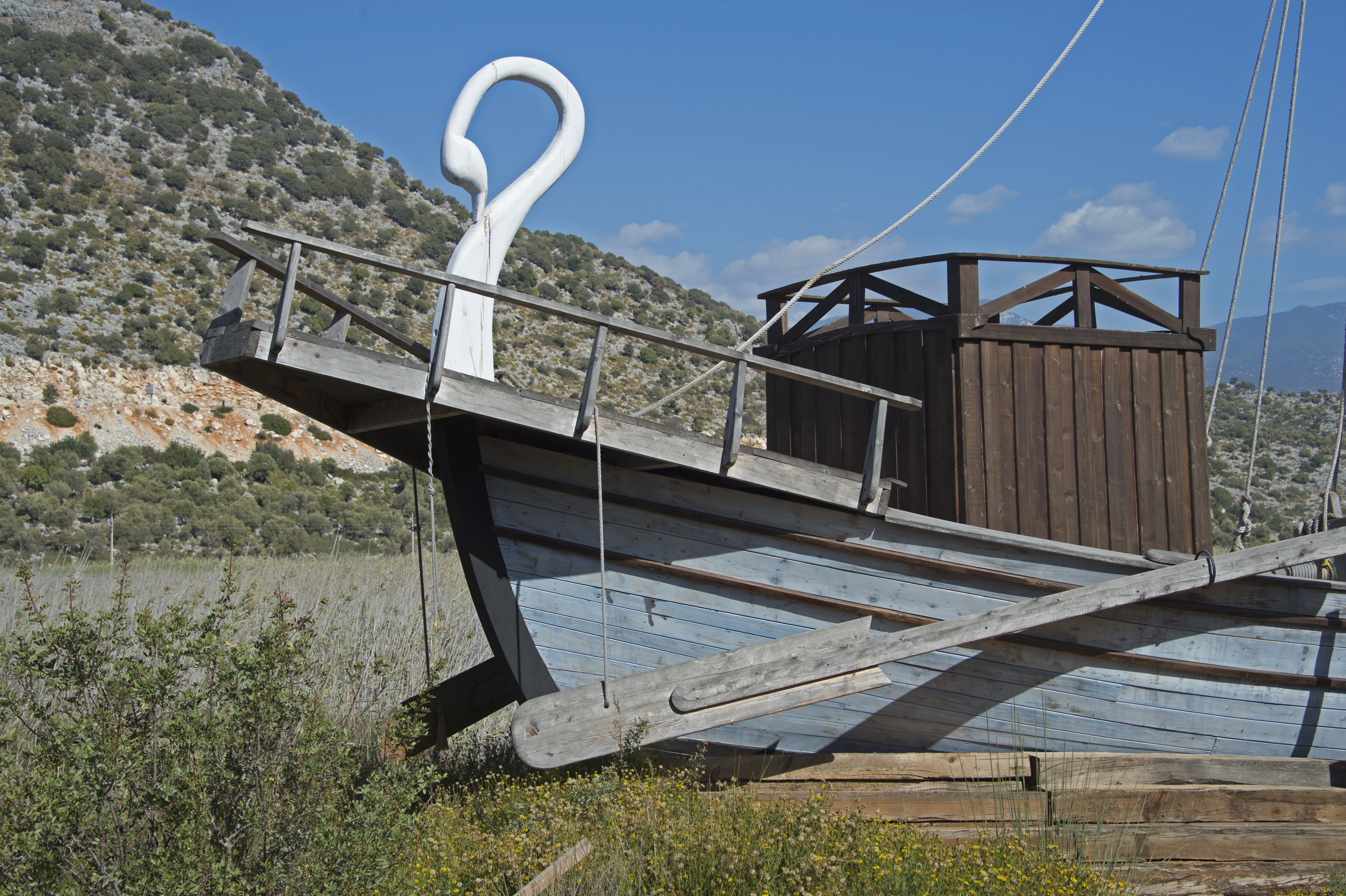
Andriake Harbour area Reconstructed ship

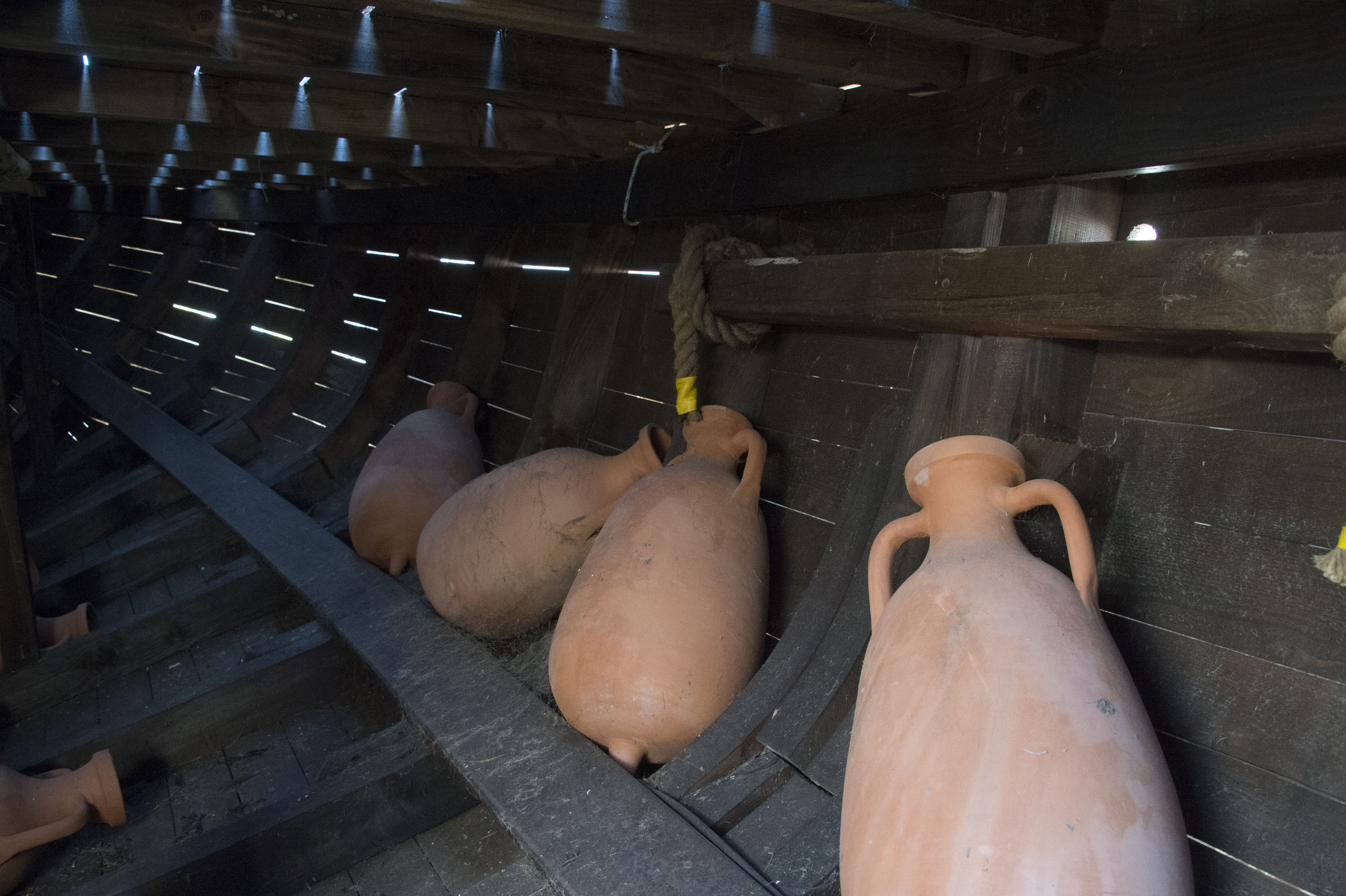
Andriake Harbour area Reconstructed ship

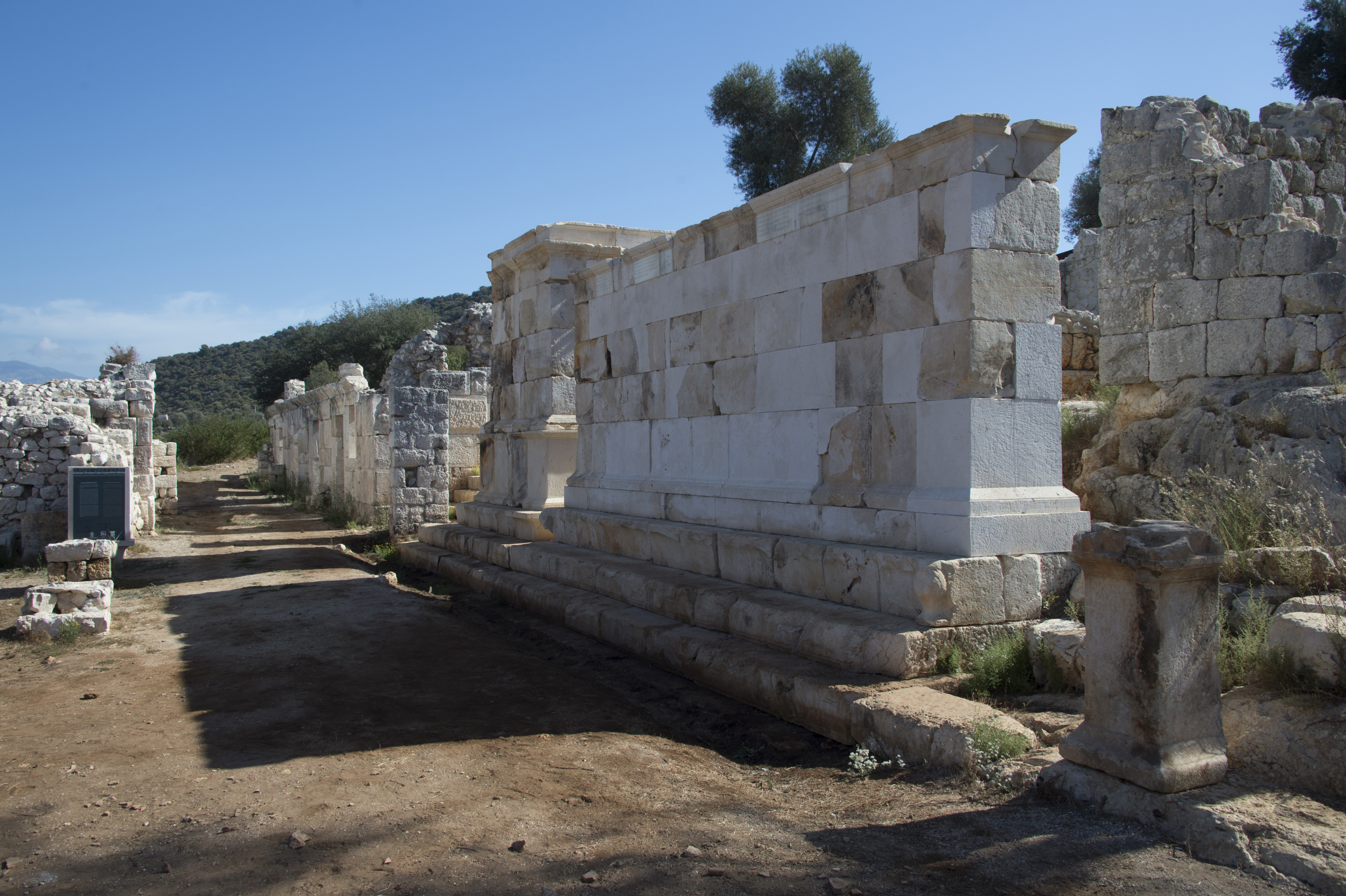
Andriake Harbour area Conferment monument

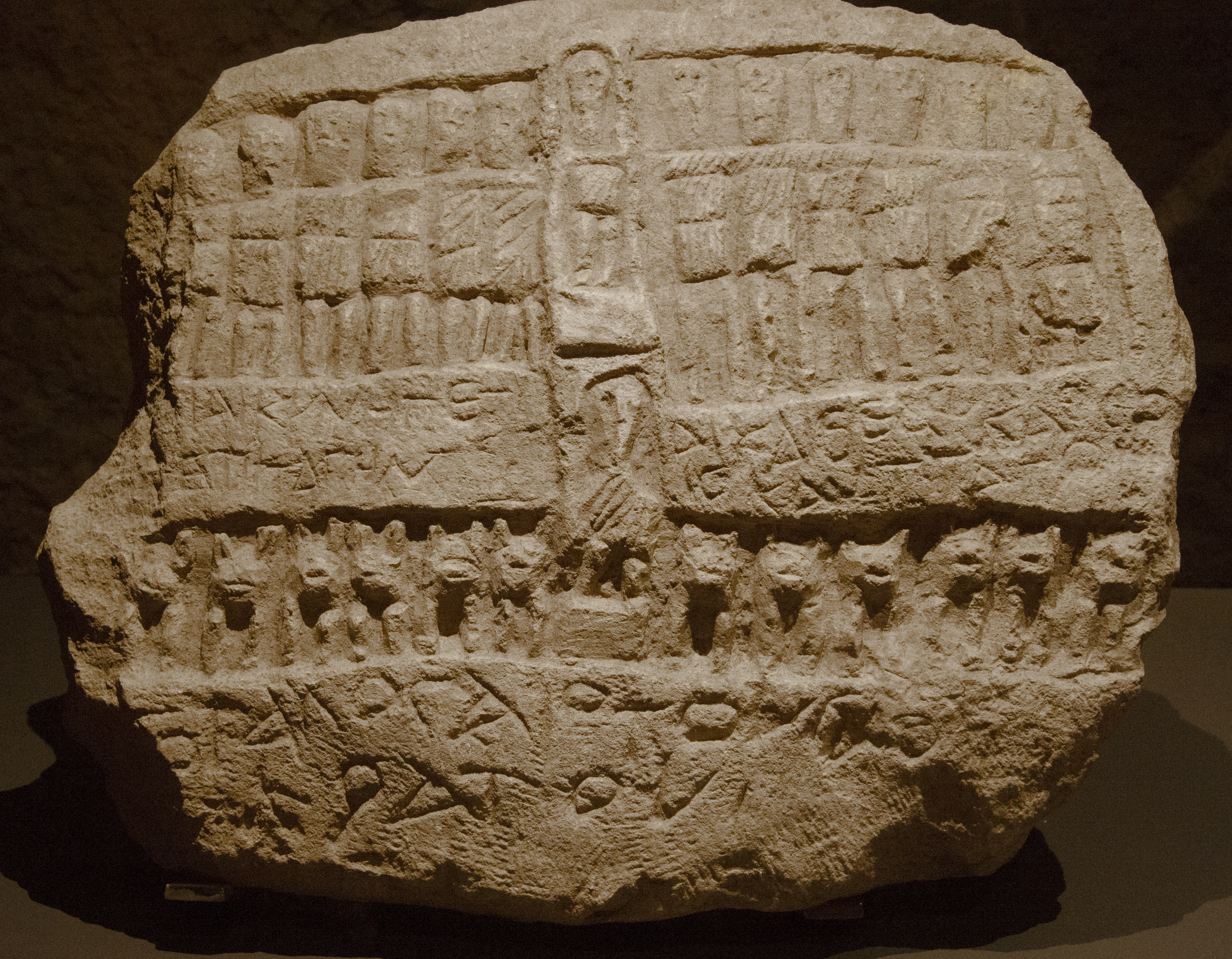
Andriake Museum Votive stele 12 gods

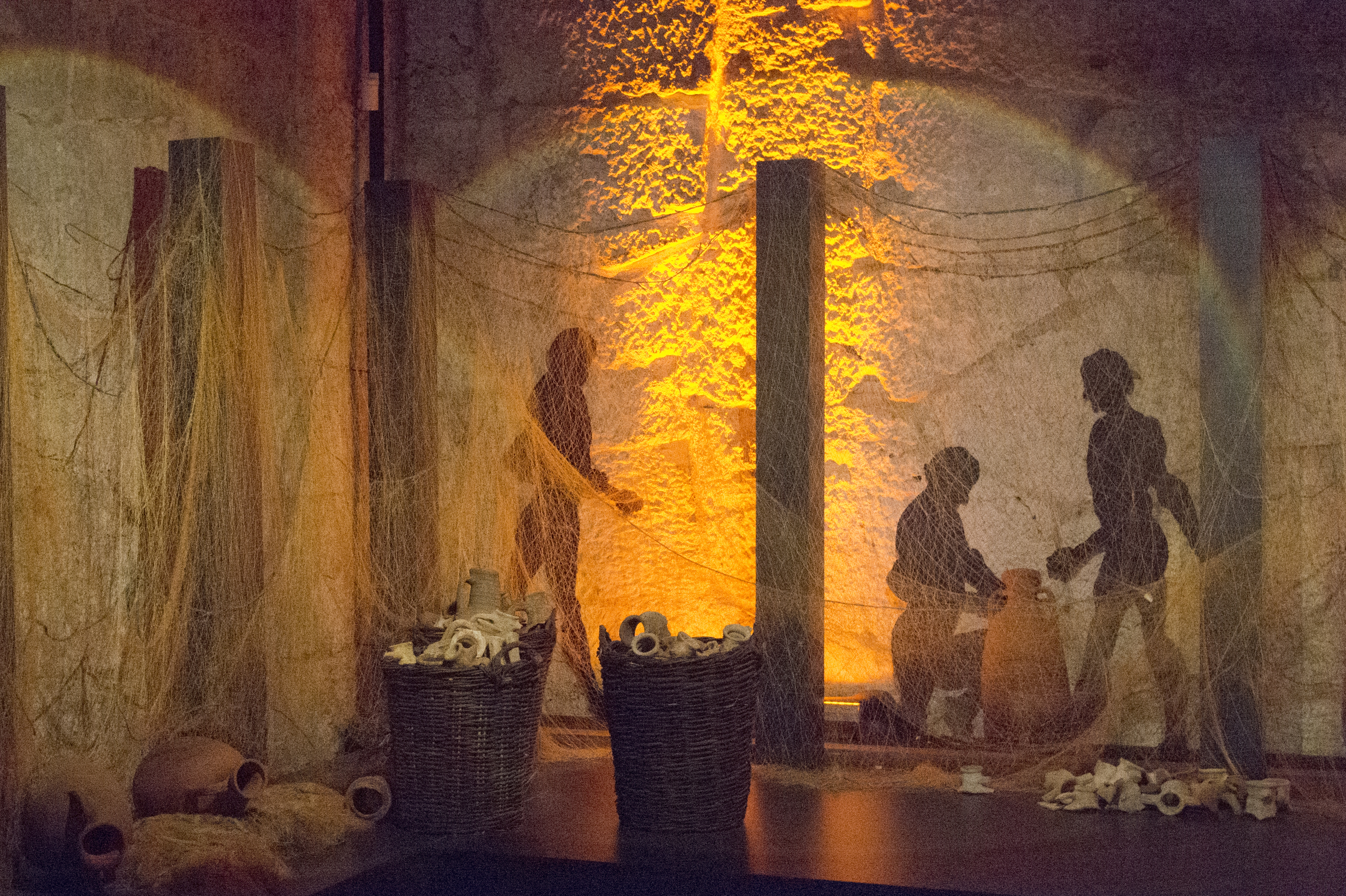
Andriake Museum General view

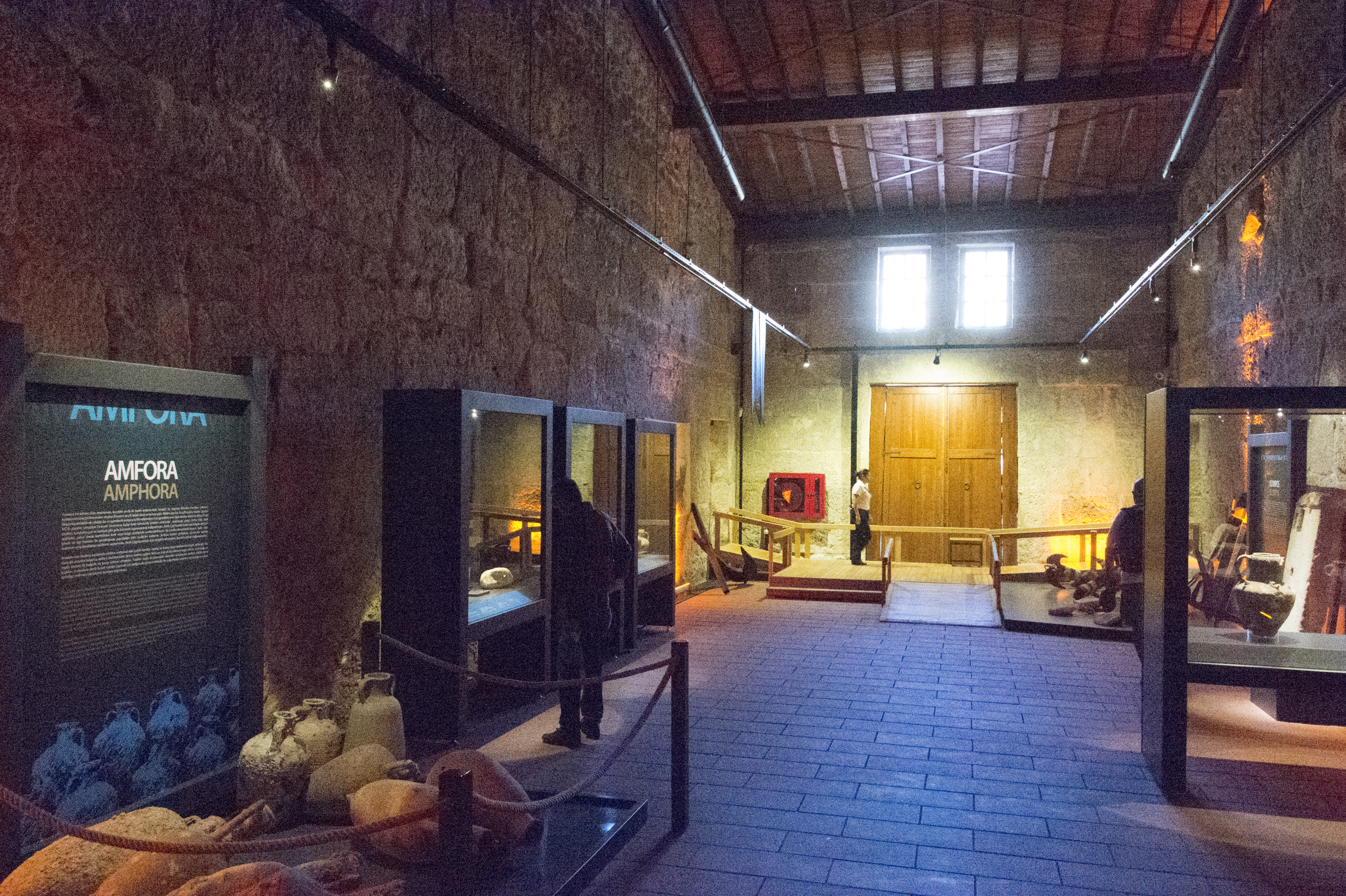
Andriake Museum General view

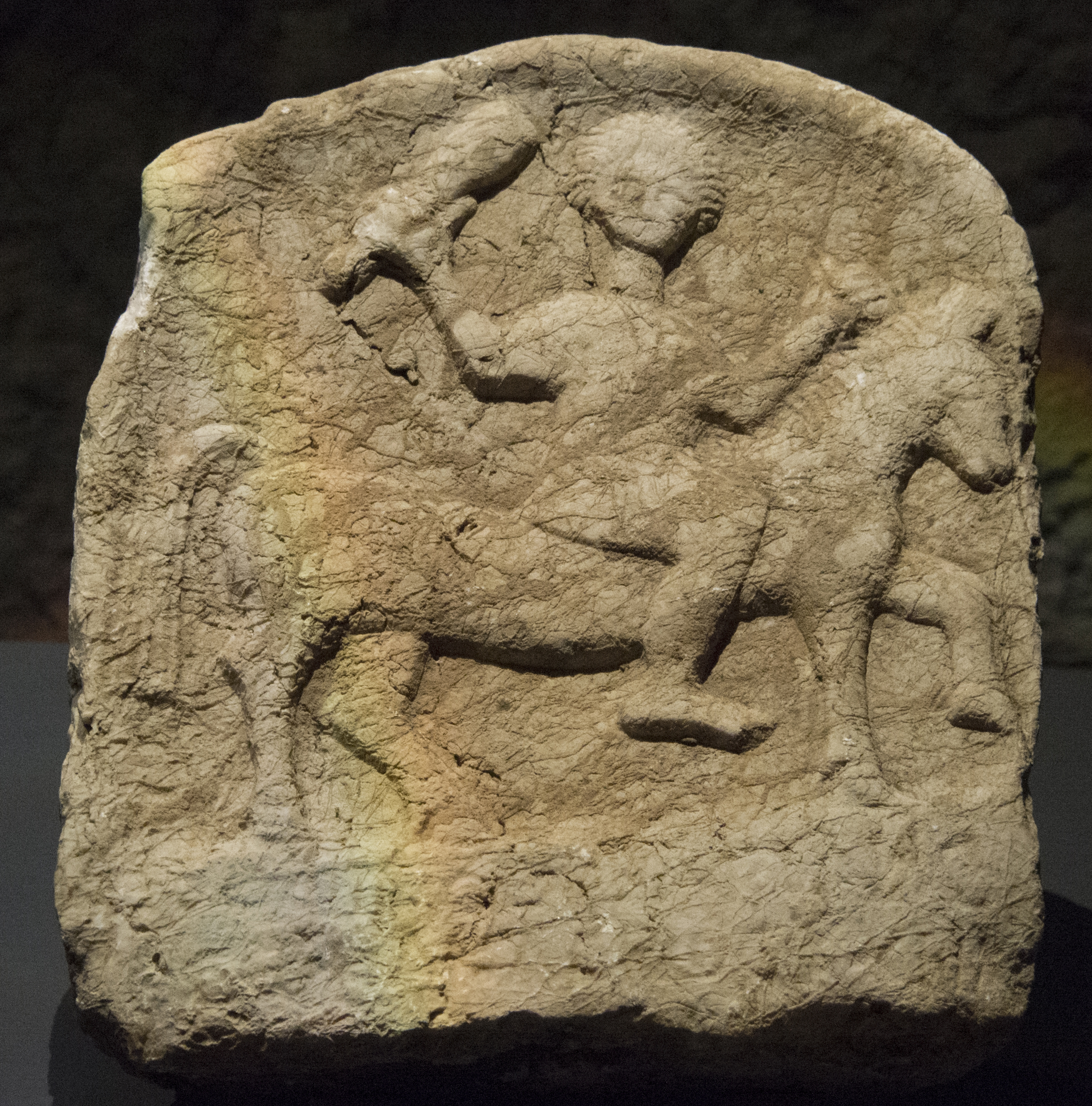
Andriake Museum Votive stele Kakasbos
