= Basilica of Saint Nicholas, Bari =

Church in Bari, Italy

Basilica of Saint Nicholas Basilica di San Nicola
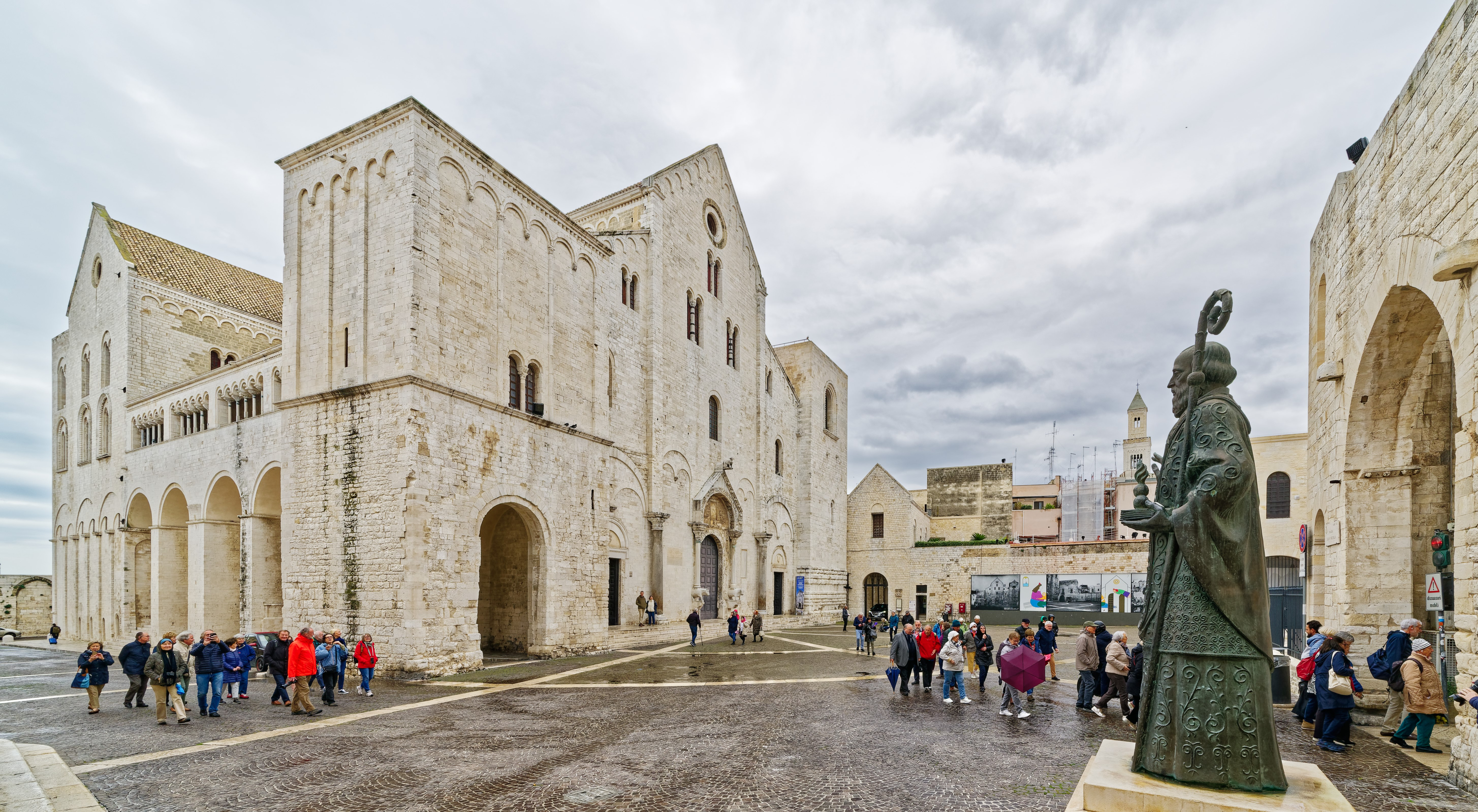
- Side view with statue of St. Nicholas

Religion
- Affiliation: Catholic Church
- Province: Archdiocese of Bari-Bitonto
- Rite: Roman Rite
- Ecclesiastical or organisational status: Pontifical minor basilica
- Year consecrated: 1197
- Status: Active

Location
- Location: Bari, Italy
- Interactive map of Basilica of Saint Nicholas; Basilica di San Nicola
- Coordinates: 41°7′48.94″N 16°52′13.01″E

Architecture
- Type: Church
- Style: Romanesque
- Groundbreaking: 1089
- Completed: 1197

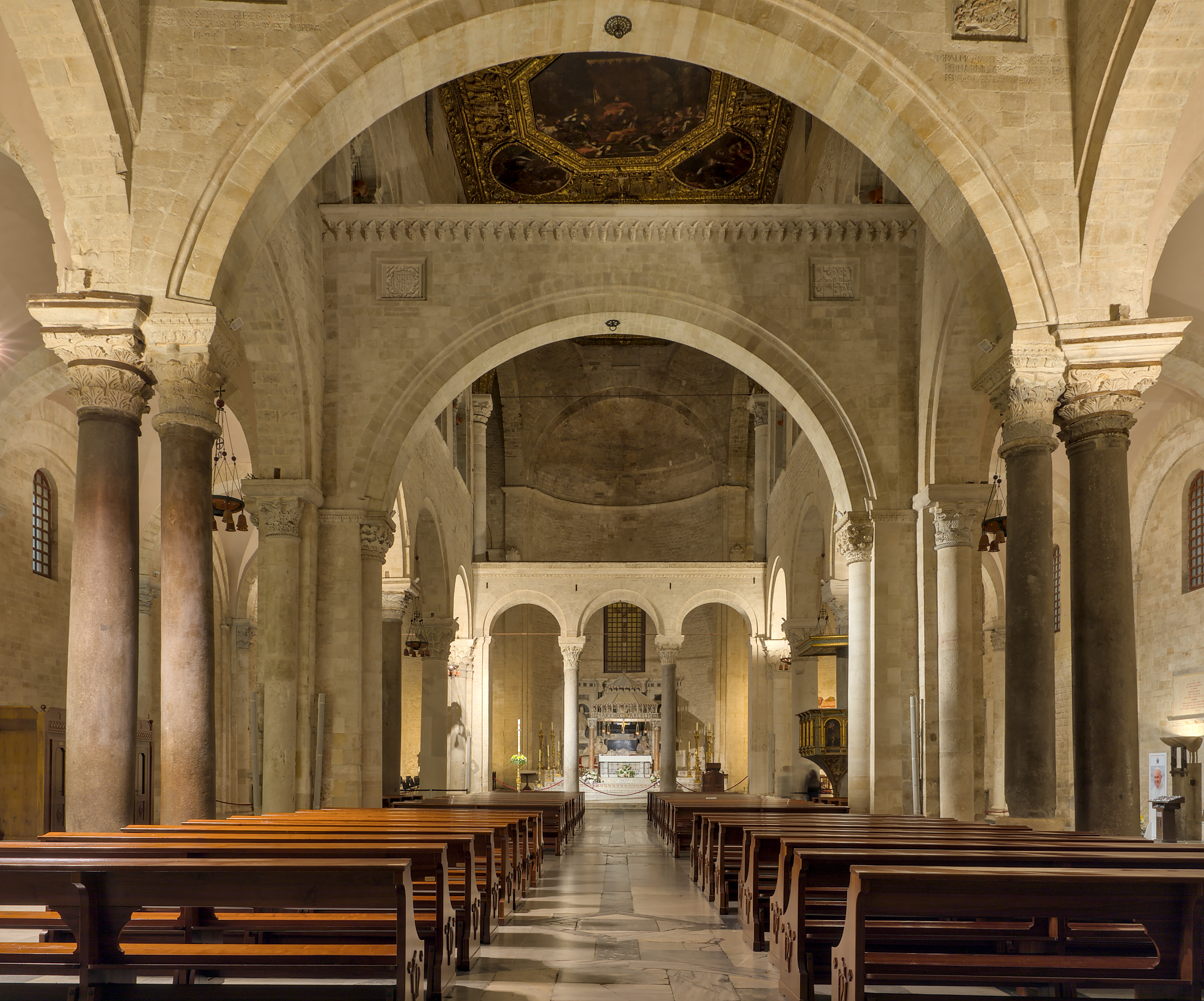
The interior.

The Pontifical Basilica of Saint Nicholas is a church in Bari, southern Italy, that holds wide religious significance throughout Europe and the Christian world.

The shrine is designated a basilica by the privilege of immemorial status. It is an important pilgrimage destination both for Catholics and Orthodox Christians.

== History ==
The basilica was built between 1087 and 1197, during the Italo-Norman domination of Apulia, the area previously occupied by the Byzantine Catapan of which Bari was the seat. Its foundation is related to the recovery of some of the relics of Saint Nicholas from the saint's original shrine in Myra, in what is now Turkey. When Myra passed into the hands of the Saracens, some saw it as an opportunity to move the saint's relics to a safer location. According to the justifying legend, the saint, passing by the city on his way to Rome, had chosen Bari as his burial place. There was great competition for the relics between Venice and Bari. The latter won, the relics were carried off under the noses of the lawful Greek custodians and their Muslim masters, and on 9 May 1087, were safely landed at Bari. A new church was built to shelter Nicholas' remains and Pope Urban II was present at the consecration of the crypt in 1089. The edifice was officially consecrated in 1197, in the presence of the Imperial Vicar, Bishop Conrad of Hildesheim, and of numerous bishops, prelates and noblemen. Elias, abbot of the nearby monastery of Saint Benedict, was named as first archbishop. His cathedra (bishop's throne) still stands in the church.

== Architecture ==
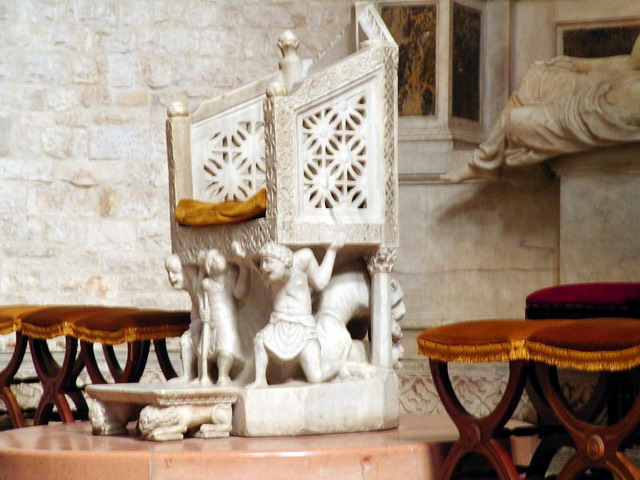
The Cathedra of Bishop Elias.

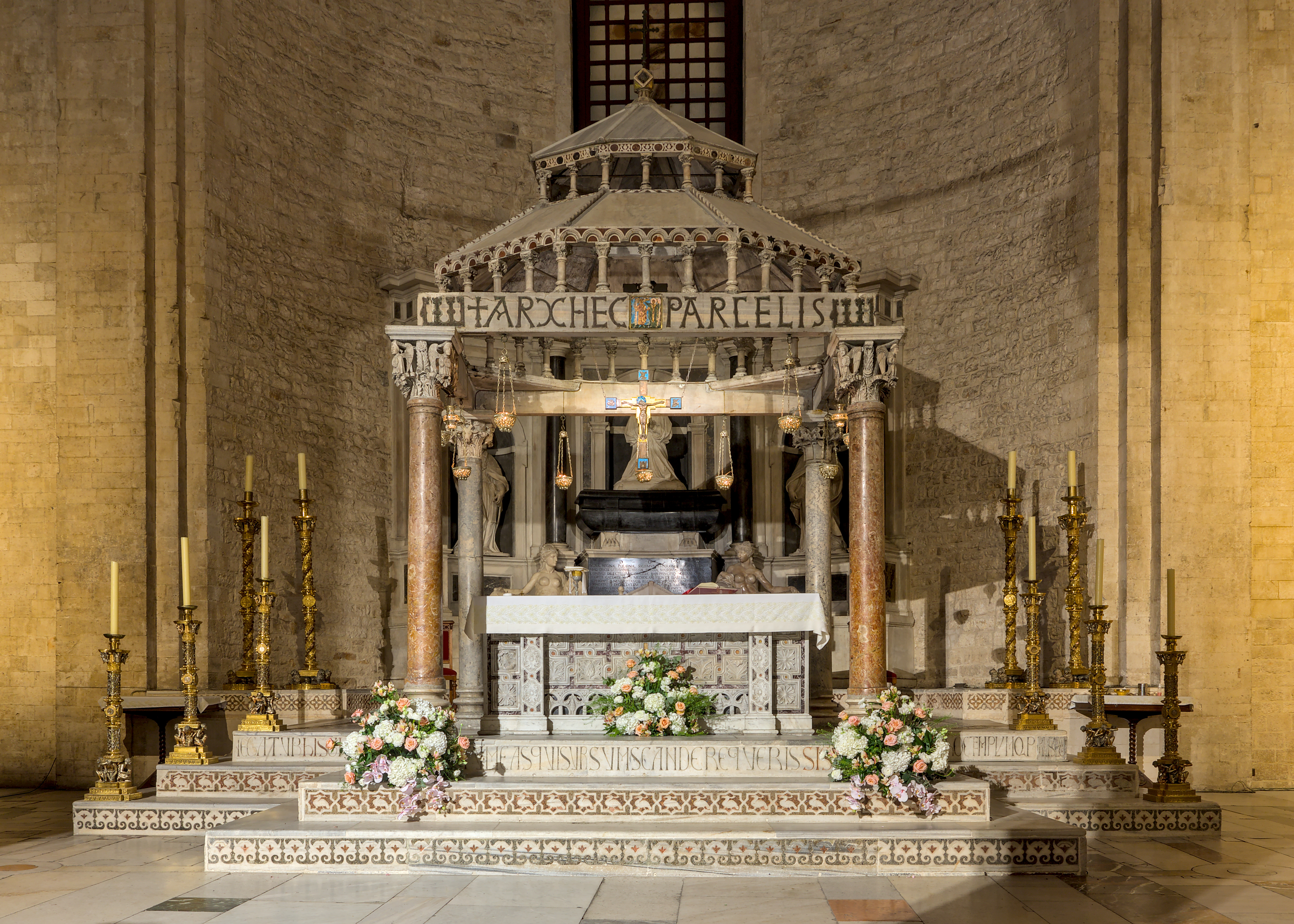
The ciborium.

The church has a rather square appearance, seemingly more suited to a castle than to a church. This impression is strengthened by the presence of two low massive towers framing the facade. It was indeed used several times as castle during its history.

The interior has a nave and two aisles, divided by granite columns and pilasters. The presbytery is separated from the rest of the edifice by mean of three arches supported by columns of Byzantine influence. Above the aisles is the matronaeum, a tribune gallery for women, opening into the nave. The basilica was the first church of this design, setting a precedent which was later imitated in numerous other constructions in the region.

In 2012, a set of integrated data from ground-penetrating radar and seismic sonar highlighted the presence of relevant water infiltrations in two areas of the crypt restored in 1950, which may possibly be due to an accumulation of humidity.

== Treasures ==
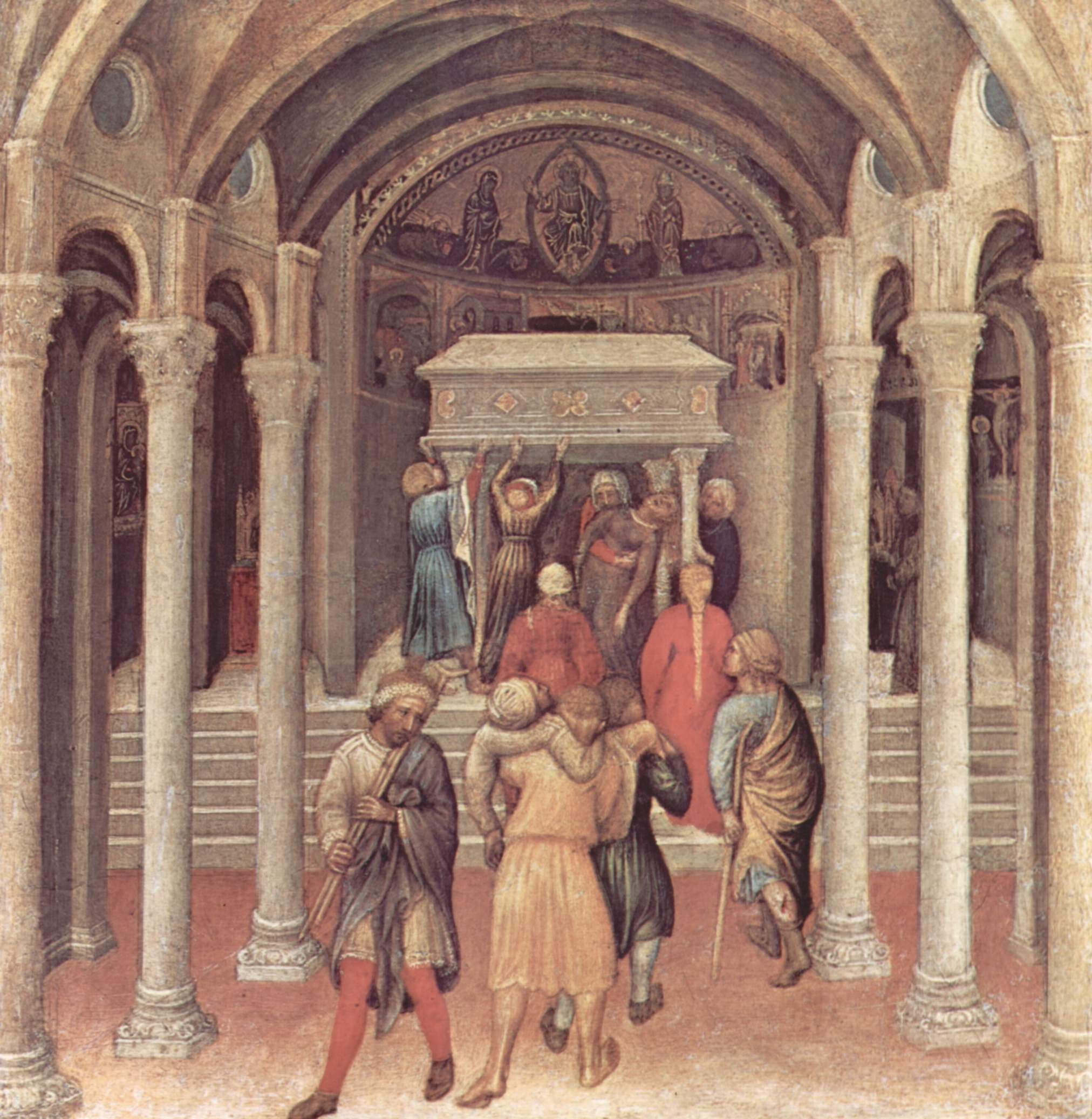
Pilgrims at the tomb of Saint Nicholas in Bari (Gentile da Fabriano, c. 1425, National Gallery of Art, Washington, D.C.).

The Basilica houses one of the most noteworthy Romanesque sculptural works of southern Italy, a cathedra (bishop's throne) finished in the late eleventh century for Elias. There are precious mosaic pavements in the crypt and presbytery. The ciborium, the most ancient in the region, is also decorated with mosaic; it has four columns with foliage, animals and mythological figures. The crypt, with 26 columns sporting capitals in Byzantine and Romanesque style, houses the relics of Saint Nicholas.

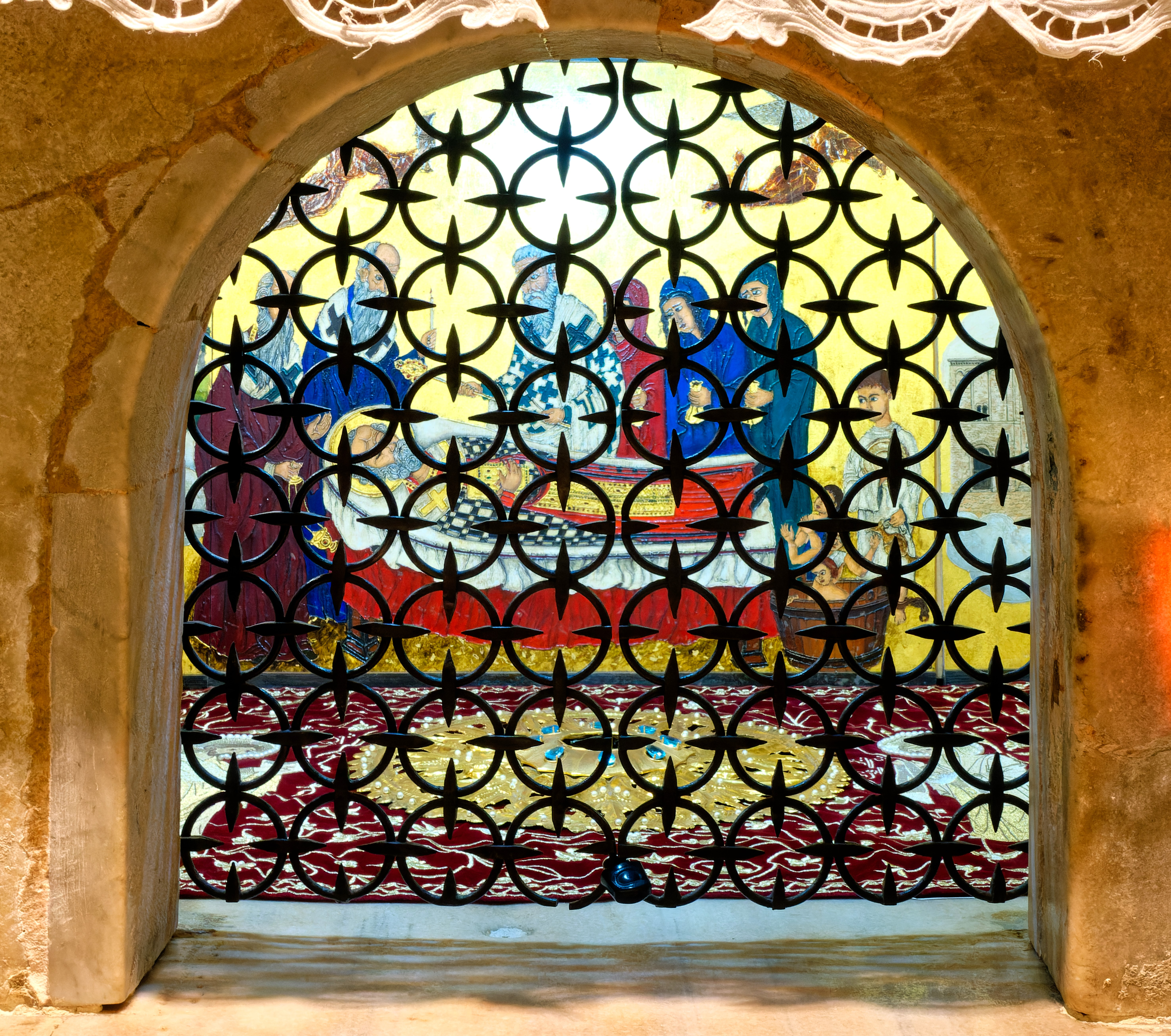
The Tomb of Saint Nicholas (2023).

In the church there is a 16th-century Renaissance tomb of Bona Sforza, Queen of Poland, made from marble. The Museum of the Basilica has valuable works of art, including a collection of twelfth-century candelabras donated by King Charles I of Anjou.

The church was restored in the late 13th century, in 1456 and in the 17th century. In the 20th-century restoration, most of the Baroque additions were removed, leaving only the gilded wooden ceiling, enframing canvases by Carlo De Rosa.

== Feast days ==
6 December is Saint Nicholas Day, the main feast day of Saint Nicholas. On this day, it is traditional for the clergy of the basilica to lower a flask into the subterranean tomb of Saint Nicholas to extract some of the myrrh which is believed to exude from the relics. Containers of this myrrh are sent all over the world, and believers have reported numerous miracles as a result of being anointed with it. For those Orthodox Churches which follow the traditional Julian Calendar, 6 December falls on 19 December of the Gregorian Calendar, so there will actually be two celebrations of the same holy day: one according to the New Calendar (6 December) and one according to the Old Calendar (19 December). Both are celebrated with great solemnity at Bari.

9 May (22 May) is celebrated annually in the Russian Orthodox Church as the feast day of the "Translation of the Relics of Saint Nicholas from Myra to Bari".

Pilgrimages to the basilica from Eastern Europe have increased dramatically since the fall of the Iron Curtain, not only for the feast days, but throughout the year.

== Notable people ==
- Giovanni Giacomo de Antiquis (fl. 1565 – c. 1608), was a canon and choirmaster at the cathedral in the 16th century

== See also ==
- Main sights in Bari
- Cathedral of Acquaviva delle Fonti
- Cathedral of Altamura
- Sanctuary of Monte Sant'Angelo
- St. Nicholas Church, Demre
