= Translation of the Relics of Saint Nicholas from Myra to Bari =

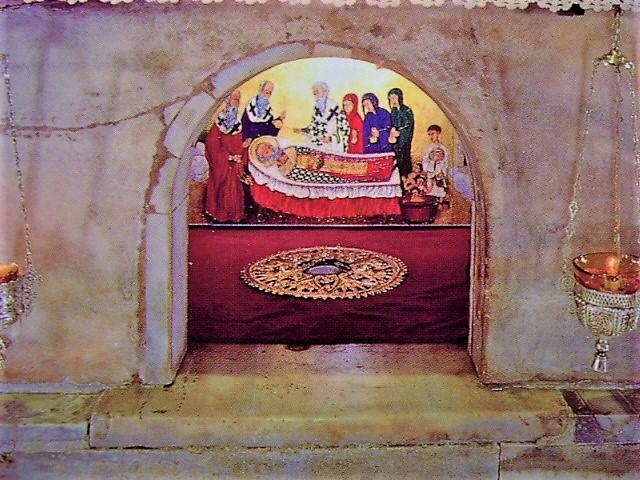
The tomb of Saint Nicholas in Bari, as it appears today

The Translation of the Relics of Saint Nicholas from Myra to Bari is a religious and folk holiday among the East Slavs and, to a lesser extent, the South Slavs and Eastern Romance peoples. It is celebrated on May 9 each year. For Old (Julian) Calendar churches, May 9 falls on May 22 of the New (Gregorian) Calendar. The feast commemorates the translation (movement) of the relics of Saint Nicholas from Myra (in present-day Turkey) to Bari, on the Italian Peninsula. To this day, the relics remain at the Basilica of Saint Nicholas.

== One story of the translation ==
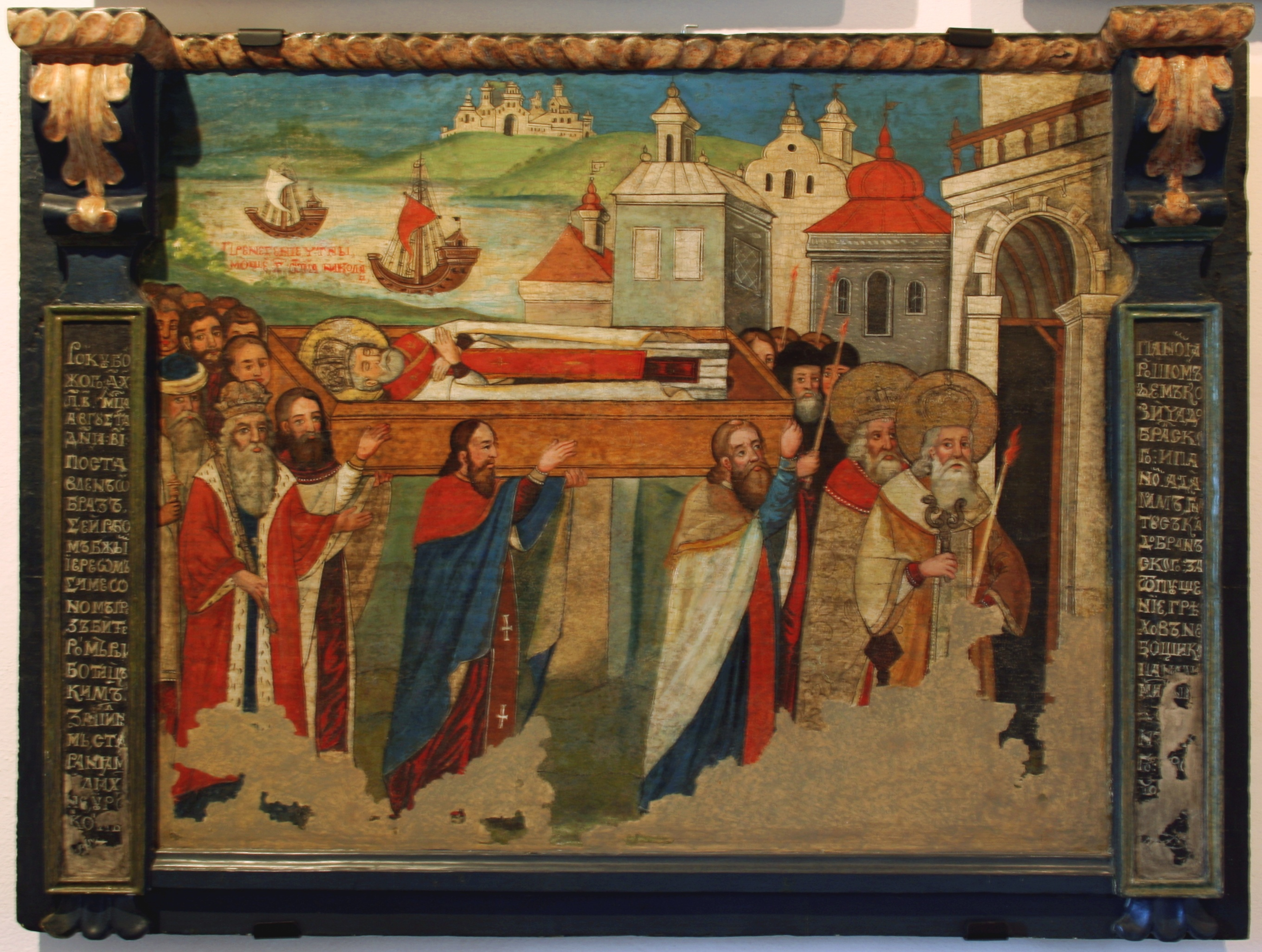
17th-century icon of the Translation of the Relics of Saint Nicholas of Myra (Historic Museum in Sanok, Poland)

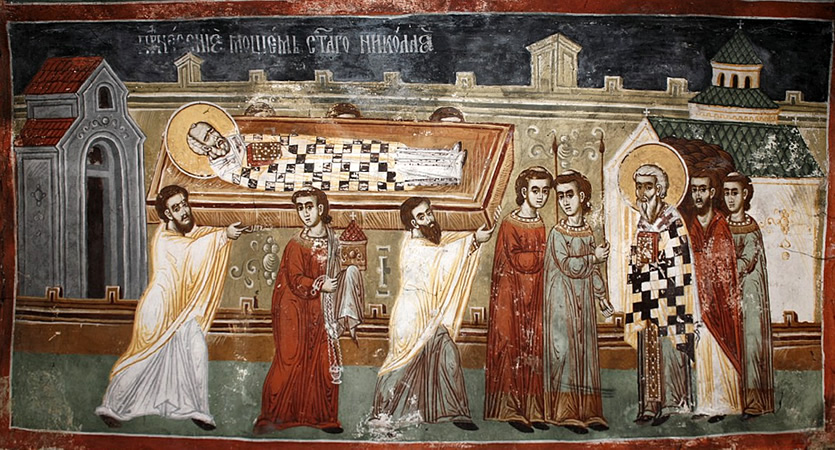
Serbian Orthodox icon, 1673–1674, in the Patriarchal Monastery of Peć, Serbia

In 1087, nobles and merchants of Bari, Italy, visited the relics of Saint Nicholas in 1087 after finding out their resting-place from the monks who guarded them. According to one account, the monks showed the resting-place but then became immediately suspicious: "Why you men, do you make such a request? You haven't planned to carry off the remains of the holy saint from here? You don't intend to remove it to your own region? If that is your purpose, then let it be clearly known to you that you parley with unyielding men, even if it mean our death." The men from Bari tried different tactics, including force, and succeeded in taking possession of the relics. An anonymous chronicler writes about what happened when the inhabitants of Myra found out:

Meanwhile, the inhabitants of the city learned of all that had happened from the monks who had been set free. Therefore they proceeded in a body, a multitude of men and women, to the wharves, all of them filled and heavy with affliction. And they wept for themselves and their children, that they had been left bereft of so great a blessing ... Then they added tears upon tears and wailing and unassuageable lamentation to their groans, saying: "Give us our patron and our champion, who with all consideration protected us from our enemies visible and invisible. And if we are entirely unworthy, do not leave us without a share, of at least some small portion of him."

— Anonymous, Greek account of the transfer of the Body of Saint Nicholas, 13th century

Professor Nevzat Cevik, the Director of Archaeological Excavations in Demre (Myra), has recently recommended that the Turkish government should request the repatriation of Saint Nicholas' relics, alleging that it had always been the saint's intention to be buried in Myra. The Venetians, who also claimed to have some parts of Saint Nicholas, had another story: The Venetians brought the remains back to Venice, but on the way they left an arm of Saint Nicholas at Bari (The Morosini Codex 49A).

== See also ==
- Nikoljdan, December 6
- Basilica di San Nicola
- St. Nicholas Church, Demre
