= Myra =

Ancient town in Lycia

- Μύρα (Ancient Greek)
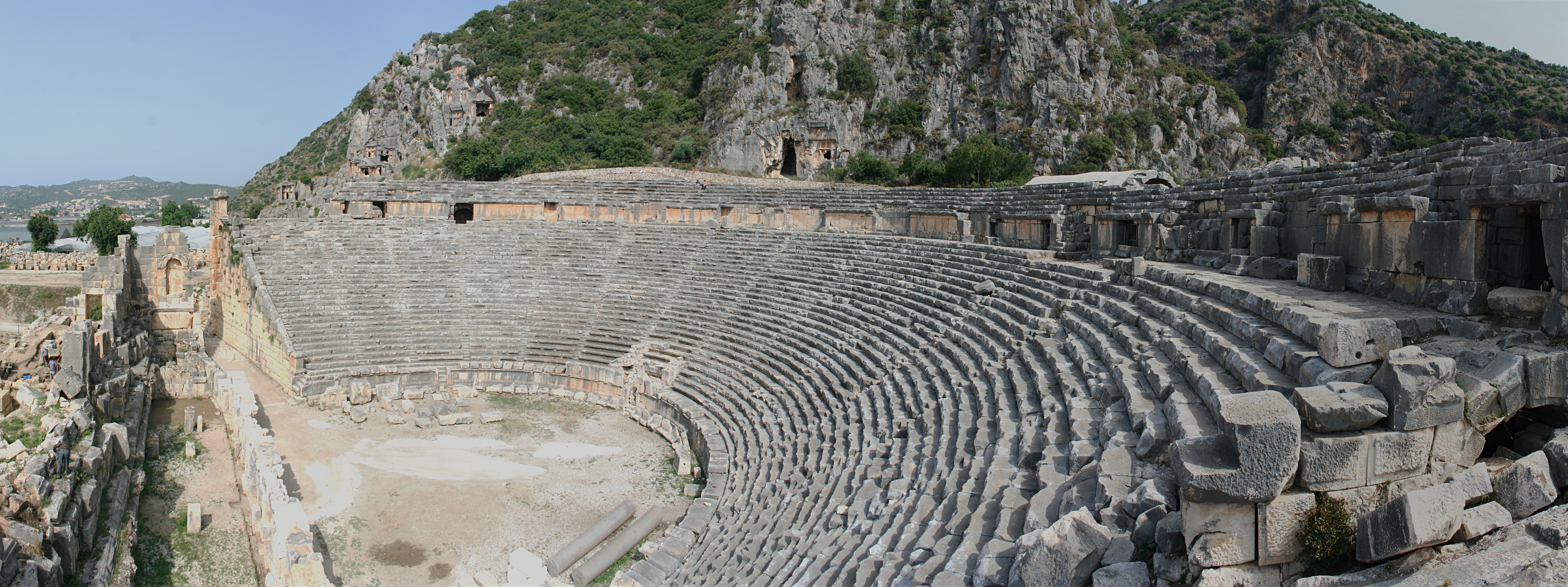
- The theater of Myra, with the rock-cut tombs of the ancient Lycian necropolis on the cliff in the background.

- Location within Turkey
- 36°15′33″N 29°59′07″E
- Type: Settlement
- Location: Demre, Antalya Province, Turkey
- Region: Lycia

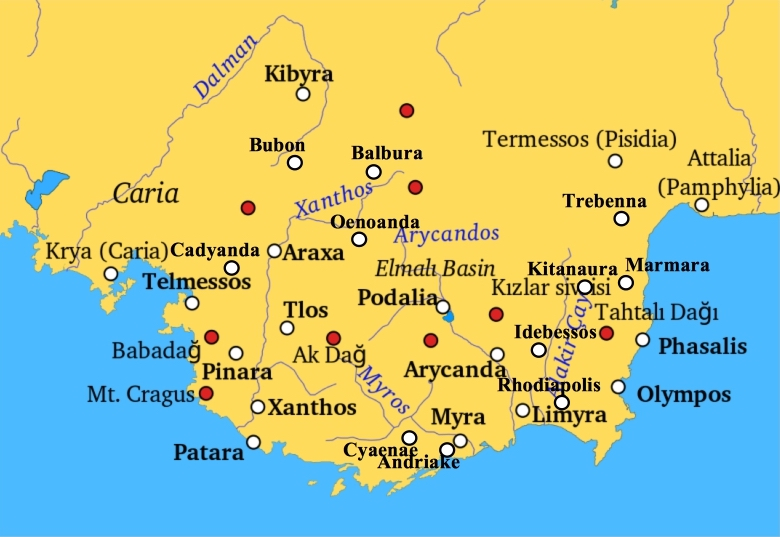
Cities of ancient Lycia. Red dots: mountain peaks, white dots: ancient cities

Myra (/ˈmaɪrə/; Ancient Greek: Μύρα, romanized: Mýra) was a city in Lycia in what is today Turkey. The city was probably founded by Lycians, and was located on the river Myros (Ancient Greek: Μύρος; Turkish: Demre Çay), in the fertile alluvial plain between the Massikytos range (Ancient Greek: Μασσικυτός; Turkish: Alaca Dağ) and the Aegean Sea. By the 3rd century BC, the city was Hellenized. Following the wars of the diadochi the area came under the loose control of the Ptolemies, the Seleucids, and finally the Romans.

The region remained under Roman control until it was conquered by the Seljuks and later the Ottomans. During the Ottoman rule the small Turkish town of Kale was established in the area of Myra in the present-day Antalya Province of Turkey. Kale was renamed to Demre in 2005.

== History ==
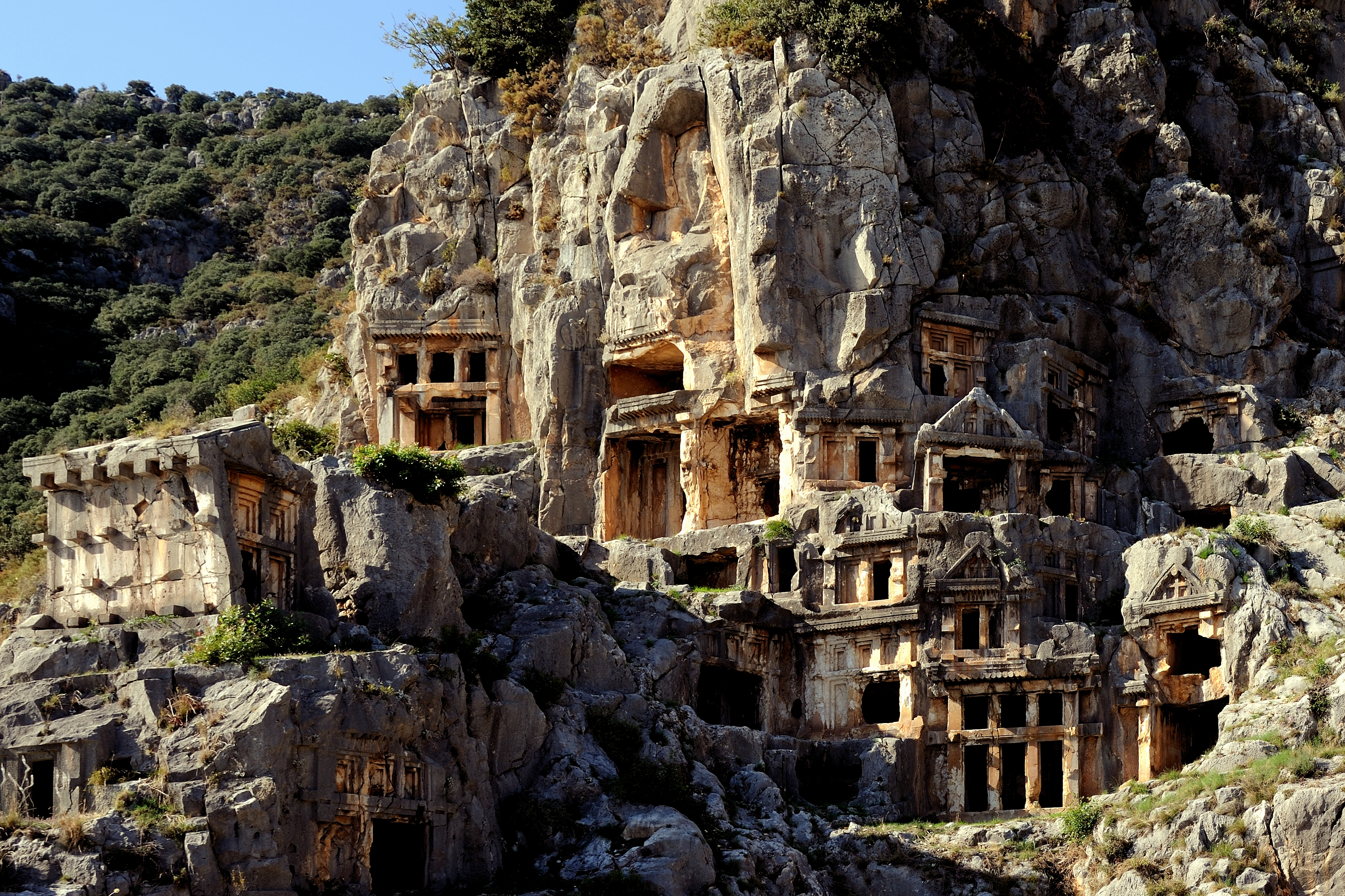
Rock-cut tombs in Myra

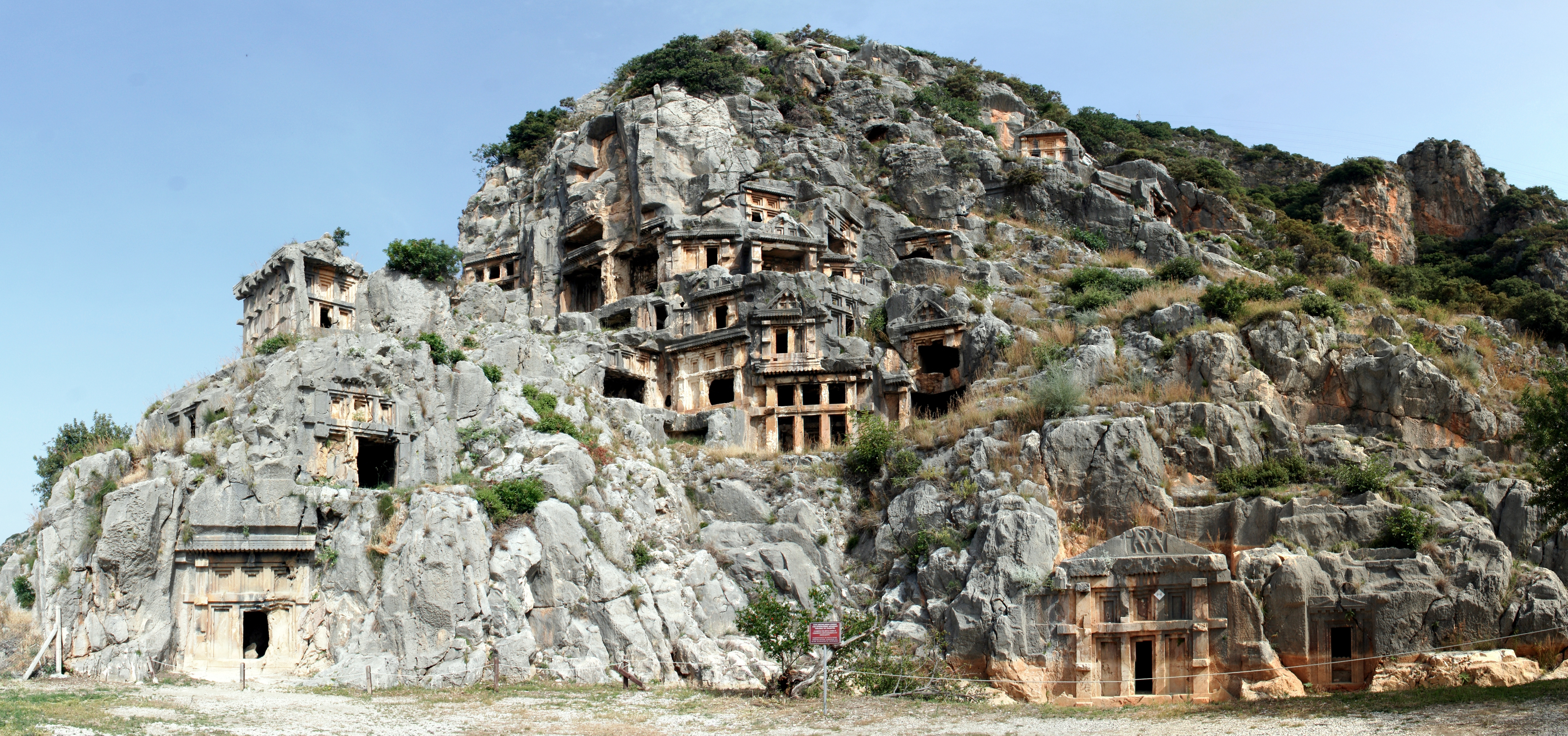
Rock-cut tombs in Myra

Although some scholars equate Myra with the town of Mira in Arzawa, this is not universally accepted. There is no substantiated written reference for Myra before it was listed as a member of the Lycian League (168 BC–AD 43); according to Strabo (14:665), it was one of the largest towns of the alliance.

The ancient Lycian citizens worshiped Artemis Eleutheria, who was the protective goddess of the town. Zeus, Athena and Tyche were venerated as well. Pliny the Elder writes that in Myra there was the spring of Apollo called Curium and when summoned three times by the pipe the fishes come to give oracular responses. In the Roman period, Myra formed a part of the Greek speaking world that rapidly embraced Christianity. One of its early Greek bishops was Saint Nicholas.

In the early Roman Empire its population may have been about 5,000 though it was considered a metropolis.

Alluvial silts mostly cover the ruins of the Lycian and Roman towns. The acropolis on the Demre-plateau, the Roman theatre and the Roman baths (eski hamam) have been partly excavated. The semi-circular theatre was destroyed in an earthquake in 141, but rebuilt afterward.

There are two necropoleis of Lycian rock-cut tombs in the form of temple fronts carved into the vertical faces of cliffs at Myra: the river necropolis and the ocean necropolis. The ocean necropolis is just northwest of the theatre. The best-known tomb in the river necropolis, 1.5 km (0.93 mi) up the Demre Cayi from the theatre, is the "Lion's tomb", also called the "Painted Tomb". When the traveler Charles Fellows saw the tombs in 1840 he found them still colorfully painted red, yellow and blue.

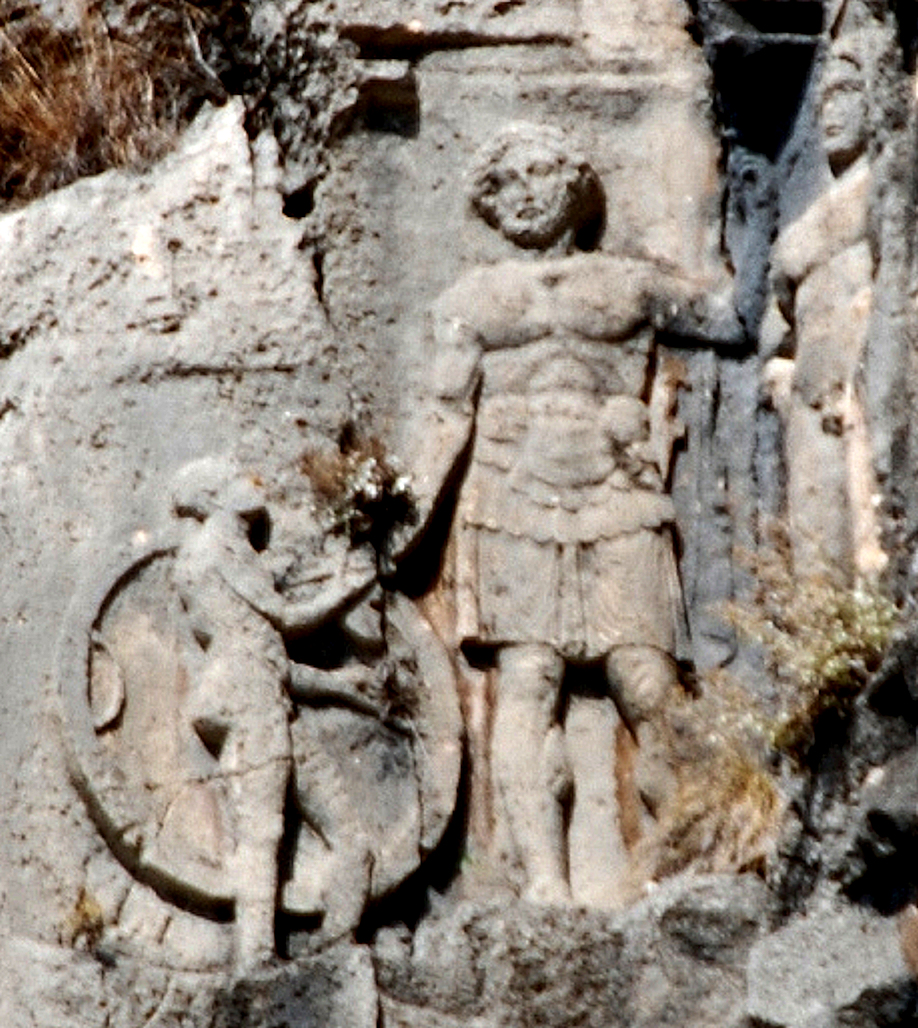
Lycian tomb relief at Myra, 4th century BC.

Andriake was the harbor of Myra in ancient times, but silted up later on. The main structure there surviving to the present day is a granary (horrea) built during the reign of the Roman emperor Hadrian (117–138 AD). Beside this granary is a large heap of Murex shells, evidence that Andriake had an ongoing operation to produce purple dye.

Excavations have been carried out at Andriake since 2009. The granary was turned into the Museum of Lycian Civilizations. The granary has seven rooms and measures 56 meters long and 32 meters wide. Artifacts found during the excavations in the Lycian League were placed in the museum. The structures in the harbor market as well as the agora, synagogue, and a six-meter deep, 24-meter long and 12-meter wide cistern were restored. A 16-meter-long Roman-era boat, a crane, and a cargo car were placed in front of the museum.

In 1923, its Greek inhabitants was required to leave by the population exchange between Greece and Turkey, at which time its church was finally abandoned.

=== Mentions in New Testament ===
The author of the Acts of the Apostles (probably Luke the Evangelist) and Paul the Apostle changed ships here during their journey from Caesarea to Rome for Paul's trial, arriving in a coastal trading vessel and changing to a sea-faring skiff secured by the Roman centurion responsible for Paul's transportation to Rome.

=== Bishopric ===
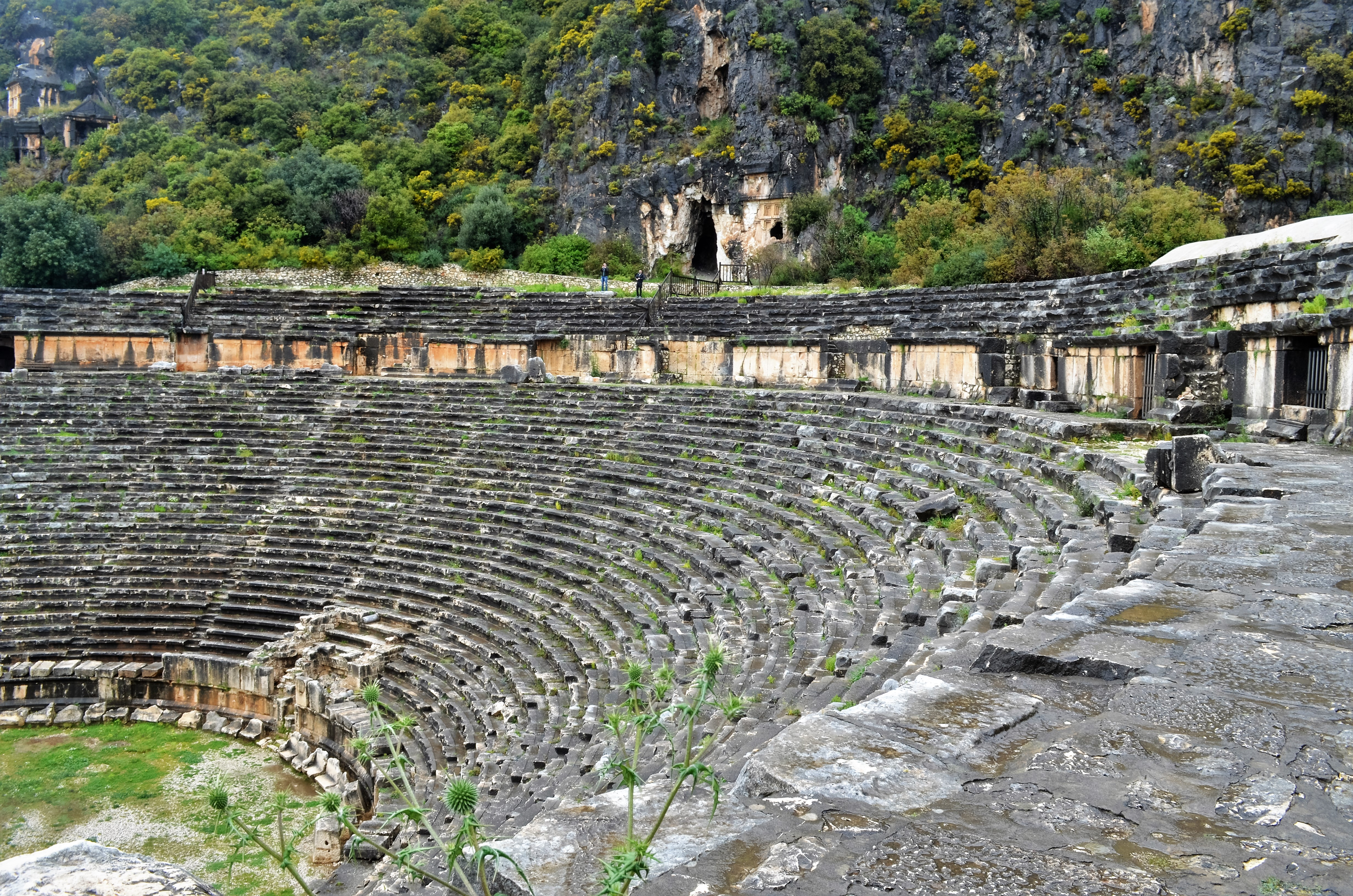
Ancient theatre of Myra

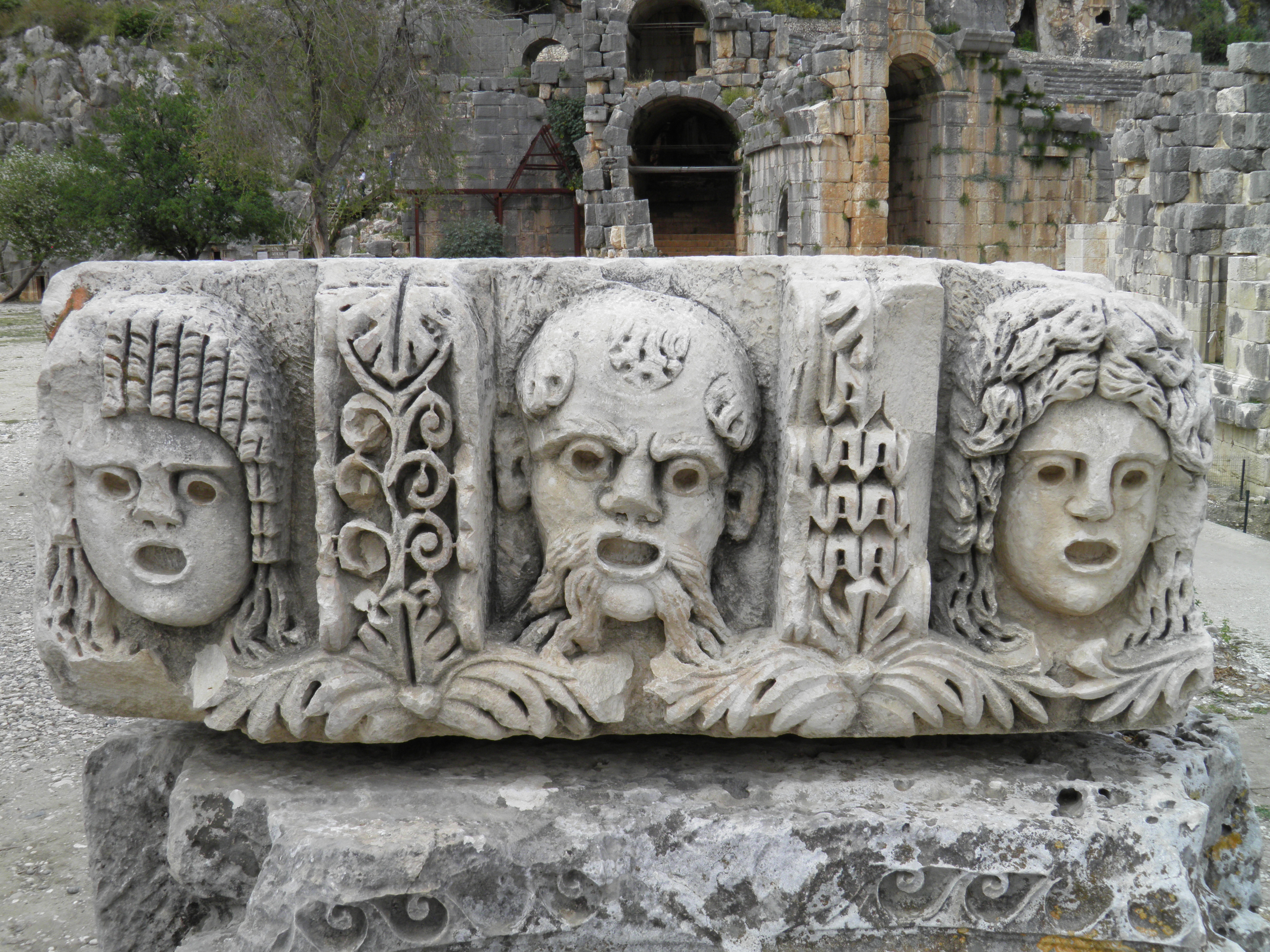
Stone faces in Myra

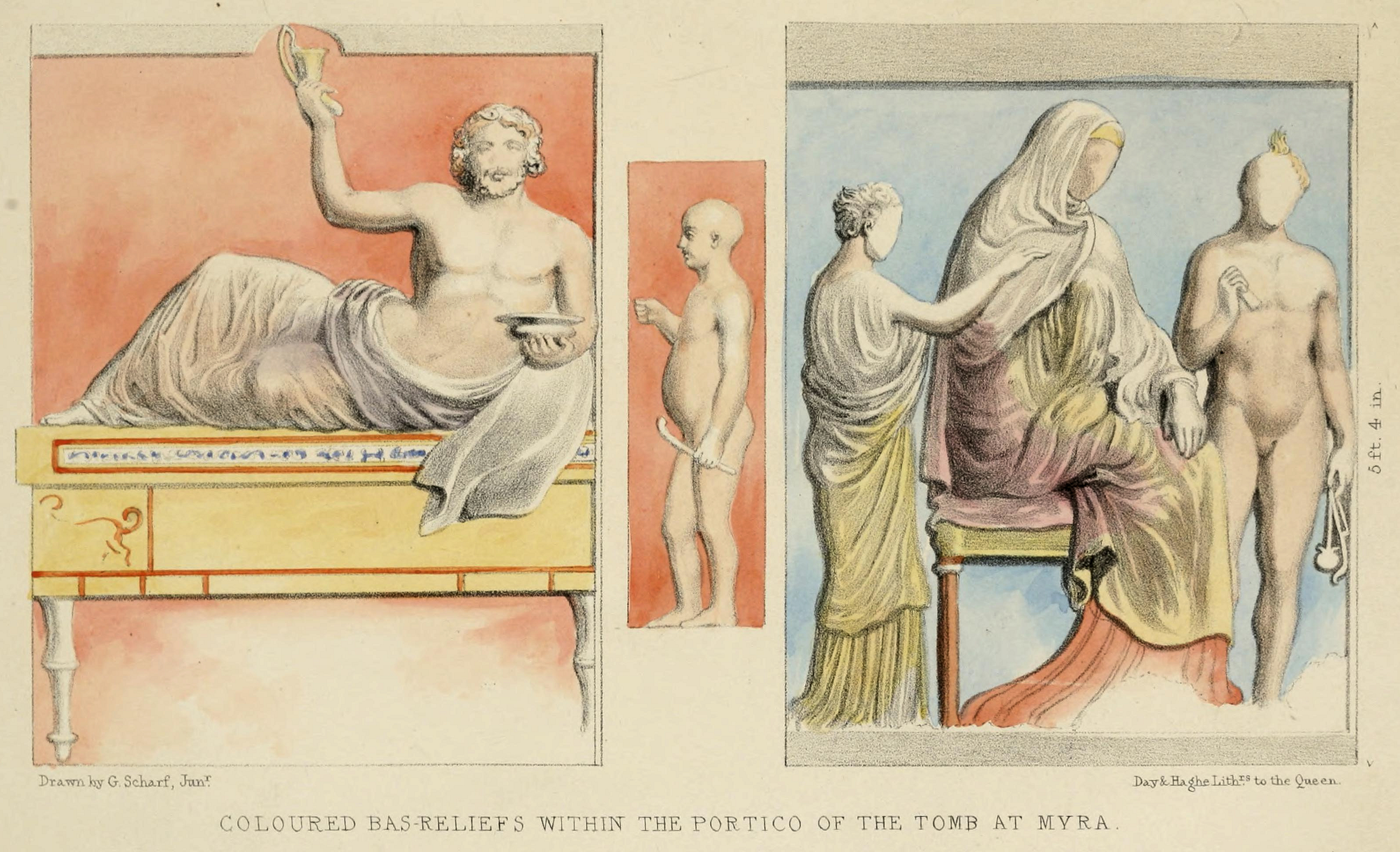
Coloured reliefs at Myra

The Acta Pauli probably testify to the existence of a Christian community at Myra in the 2nd century. Le Quien opens his list of the bishops of this city with St. Nicander, martyred under Domitian in 95, who, according to the Greek Menologion, was ordained bishop by Saint Titus. In 325, Lycia again became a Roman province distinct from that of Pamphylia, with Myra as its capital. Ecclesiastically, it thus became the metropolitan see of the province. The bishop of Myra at that time was Saint Nicholas. The 6th-century Index of Theodorus Lector is the first document that lists him among the fathers of the First Council of Nicaea in 325. Many other bishops of Myra are named in extant documents, including Petrus, the author of theological works in defence of the Council of Chalcedon quoted by Saint Sophronius of Jerusalem and by Photius (Bibliotheca, Codex 23). Theodorus and Nicolaus were both at the Second Council of Nicaea in 787, the former recanting his previous iconoclast position, the latter being the orthodox bishop whom the iconoclasts had expelled. The Notitia Episcopatuum of Pseudo-Epiphanius, composed in about 640 under the Byzantine Emperor Heraclius, reports that Myra at that time had 36 suffragan sees. The early 10th-century Notitia attributed to Emperor Leo VI the Wise lists only 33.

Myra is today listed by the Catholic Church as a titular see both in the Latin Church and as a bishopric of the Melkite Greek Catholic Church in particular. Latin bishops are no longer appointed to this see, though Melkite bishops are.

=== Arab and Turkic invasions ===
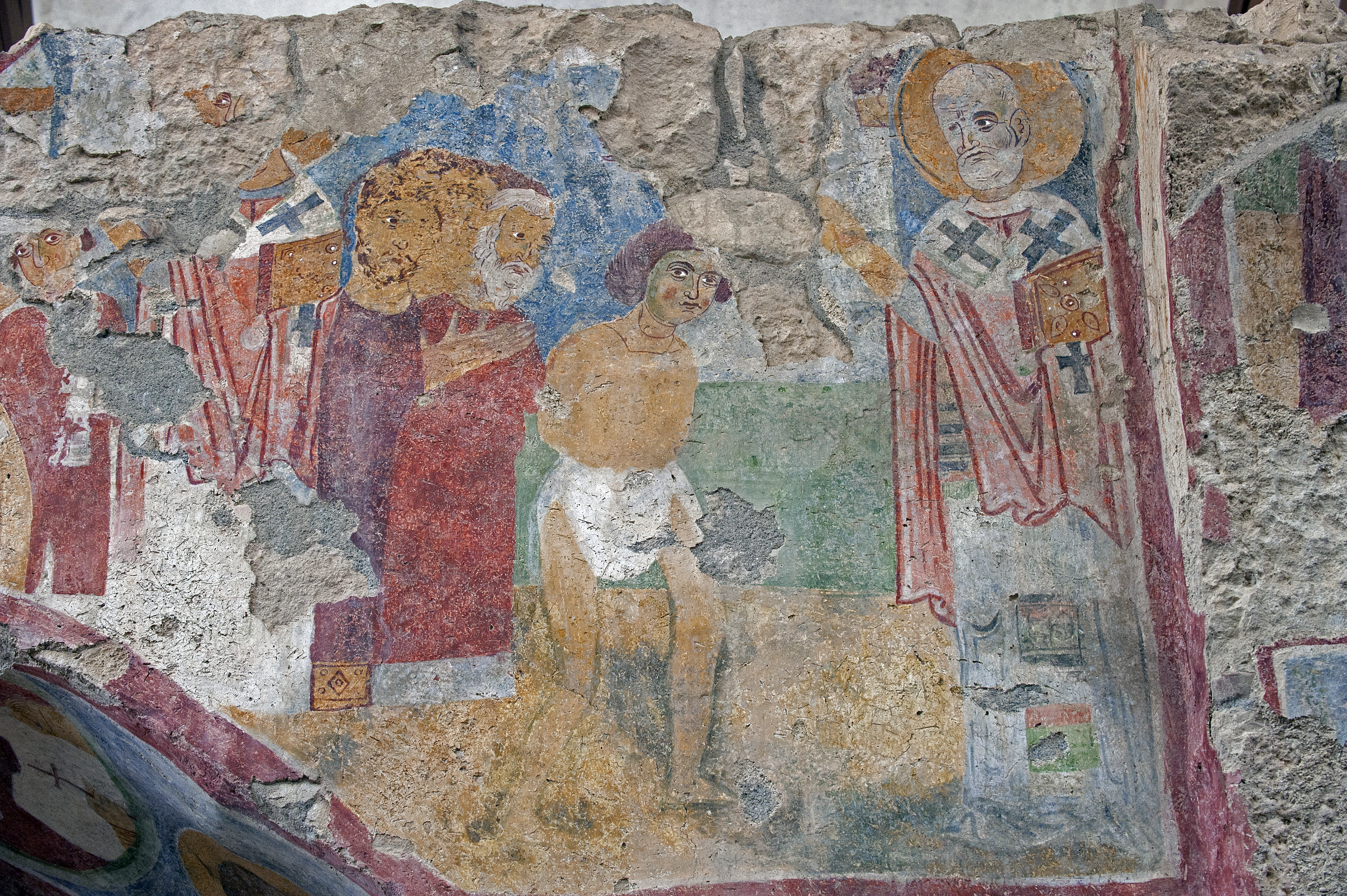
St. Nicholas Church, Demre in Myra

Myra was besieged and sacked by Abbasid troops in 809, but soon returned to Roman control. Early in the reign of emperor Alexius I Comnenus (ruled between 1081 and 1118), Myra was once more overtaken by Islamic invaders, this time the Seljuk Turks. Sailors from Bari, itself a former Roman possession in Italy that had only recently being conquered by Normans, exploited the situation and stole the relics of Saint Nicholas taking them to Bari.

The city was brought back once more under Roman control during the Komnenian restoration, before it was eventually lost at some point after the Fourth Crusade.

== Church of St. Nicholas at Myra ==
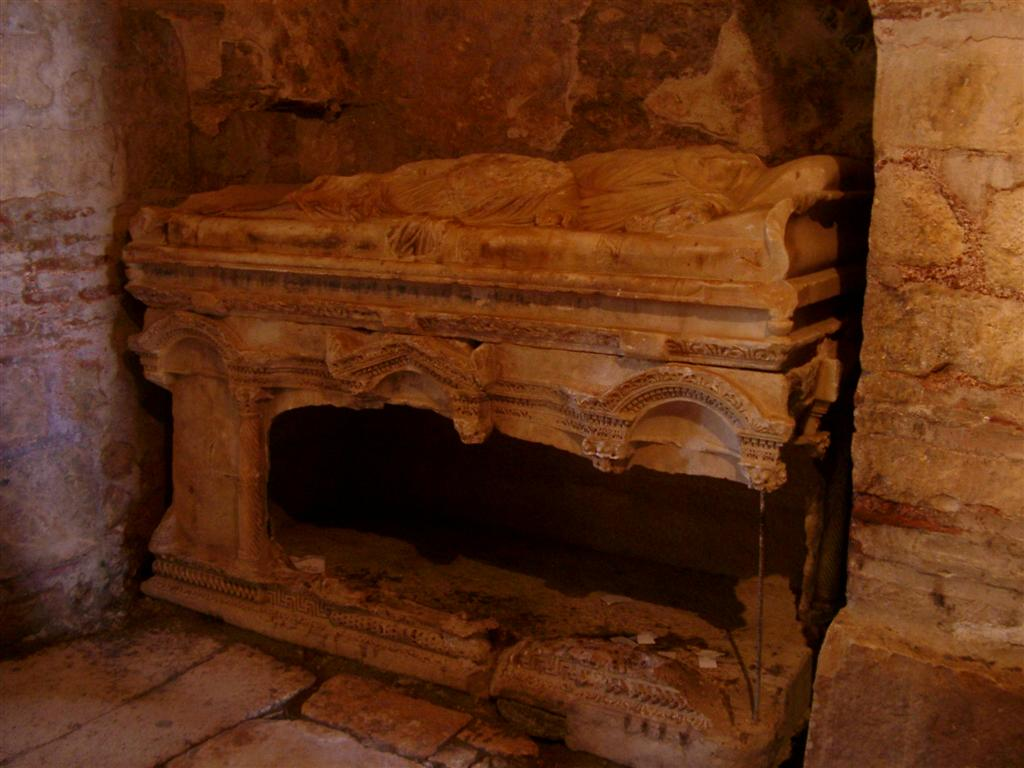
The original tomb of St. Nicholas at the basilica in Myra.

The earliest church of St. Nicholas at Myra was built at the time of Eastern Roman (Byzantine) Empire in the 6th century. The present-day church was constructed mainly from the 8th century onward; an Eastern Orthodox monastery was added in the late 11th century.

In 1863, Emperor Alexander II of Russia purchased the building and began restoration, but the work was never completed. In 1923 the church was abandoned when the city's Greek inhabitants were forced to leave for Greece by the Population exchange between Greece and Turkey. In 1963 the eastern and southern sides of the church were excavated. In 1968 the former confessio (tomb) of St. Nicholas was roofed over.

The floor of the church is made of opus sectile, a mosaic of coloured marble, and there are some remains of frescoes on the walls. A marble sarcophagus had been reused to bury the Saint; but his bones were stolen in 1087 by merchants from Bari, and are now held in that city, in the Basilica of Saint Nicholas.

The church is currently undergoing restoration. In 2007 the Turkish Ministry of Culture gave permission for the Divine Liturgy to be celebrated in the church for the first time in centuries. On 6 December 2011 Metropolitan Chrysostomos, who has the title of Myra, accordingly officiated.

== Archaeology ==
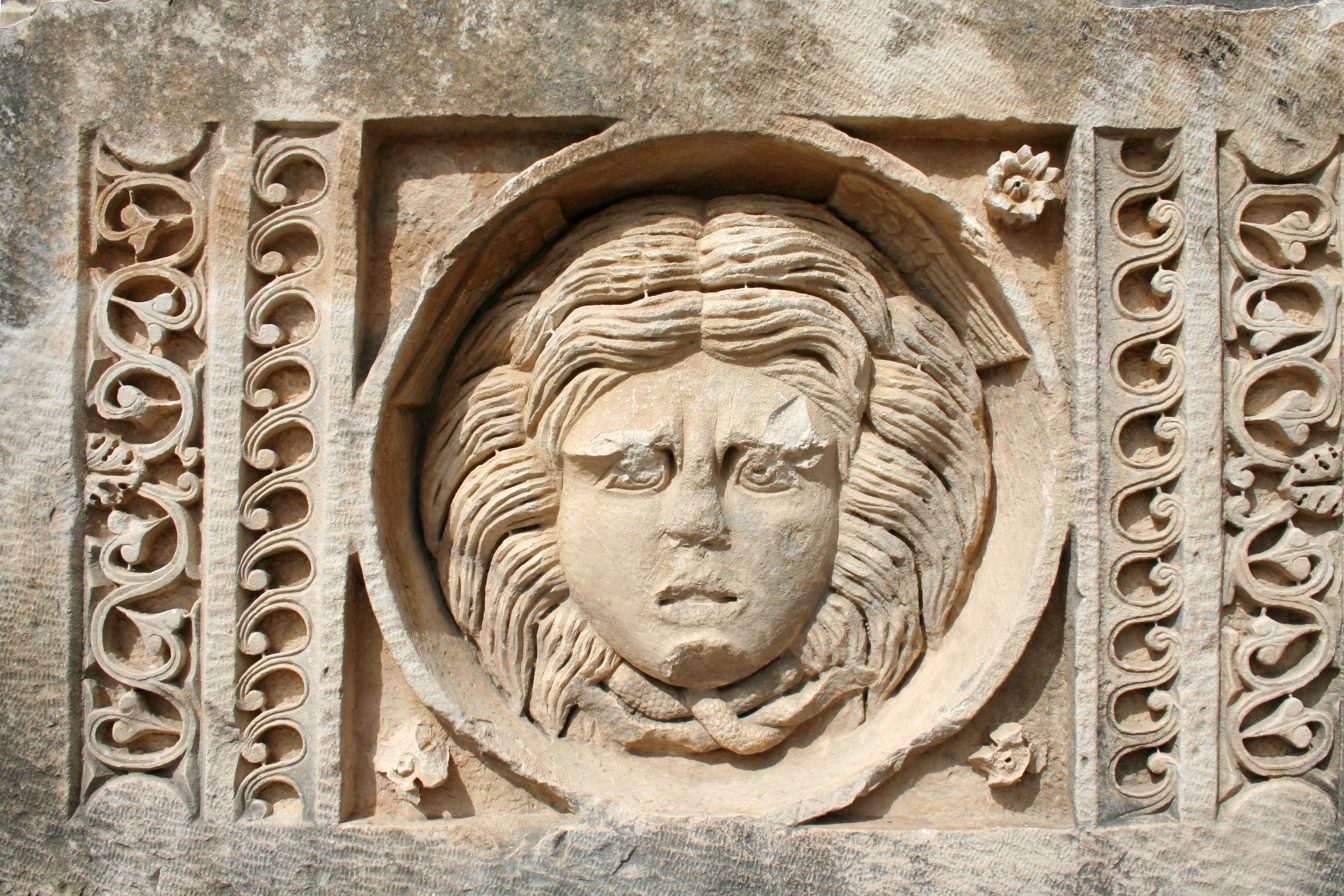
A medusa head at Myra

Archaeologists first detected the ancient city in 2009 using ground-penetrating radar that revealed anomalies whose shape and size suggested walls and buildings. Over the next two years they excavated a small, stunning 13th-century chapel sealed in an uncanny state of preservation. Carved out of one wall is a cross that, when sunlit, beams its shape onto the altar. In February 2021, Akdeniz University researchers led by Nevzat Çevik announced the discovery of dozens of 2,200-year-old terracotta sculptures with inscriptions. Archaeologists also revealed some material remains of the Hellenistic theater made of ceramic, bronze, lead, and silver. The figurines with partly preserved paint contained the appearances of men, women, cavalry, animals, some Greek deities and the names of artists.

== Notable people ==
- Saint Nicholas, bishop of Myra.
- Saint Themistocles, a Christian martyr.
- Dioskorios (Ancient Greek: Διοσκόριος) of Myra, a grammarian and prefect of the city. He was tutor of the daughters of the emperor Leon. Brother of Nicolaus of Myra.
- Nicolaus (Ancient Greek: Νικόλαος) of Myra, a rhetor and sophist who wrote an Art of Rhetoric and declamations, pupil of Lachares. Brother of Dioskorios of Myra.

== See also ==
- List of ancient Greek cities

== Bibliography ==
- Burkett, Delbert (2002). An Introduction to the New Testament and the Origins of Christianity. Cambridge University Press. ISBN 978-0-521-00720-7.
- Charlesworth, James H. (2008). The Historical Jesus: An Essential Guide. Abingdon Press. ISBN 978-1-4267-2475-6.
