= List of twin towns and sister cities in Bulgaria =

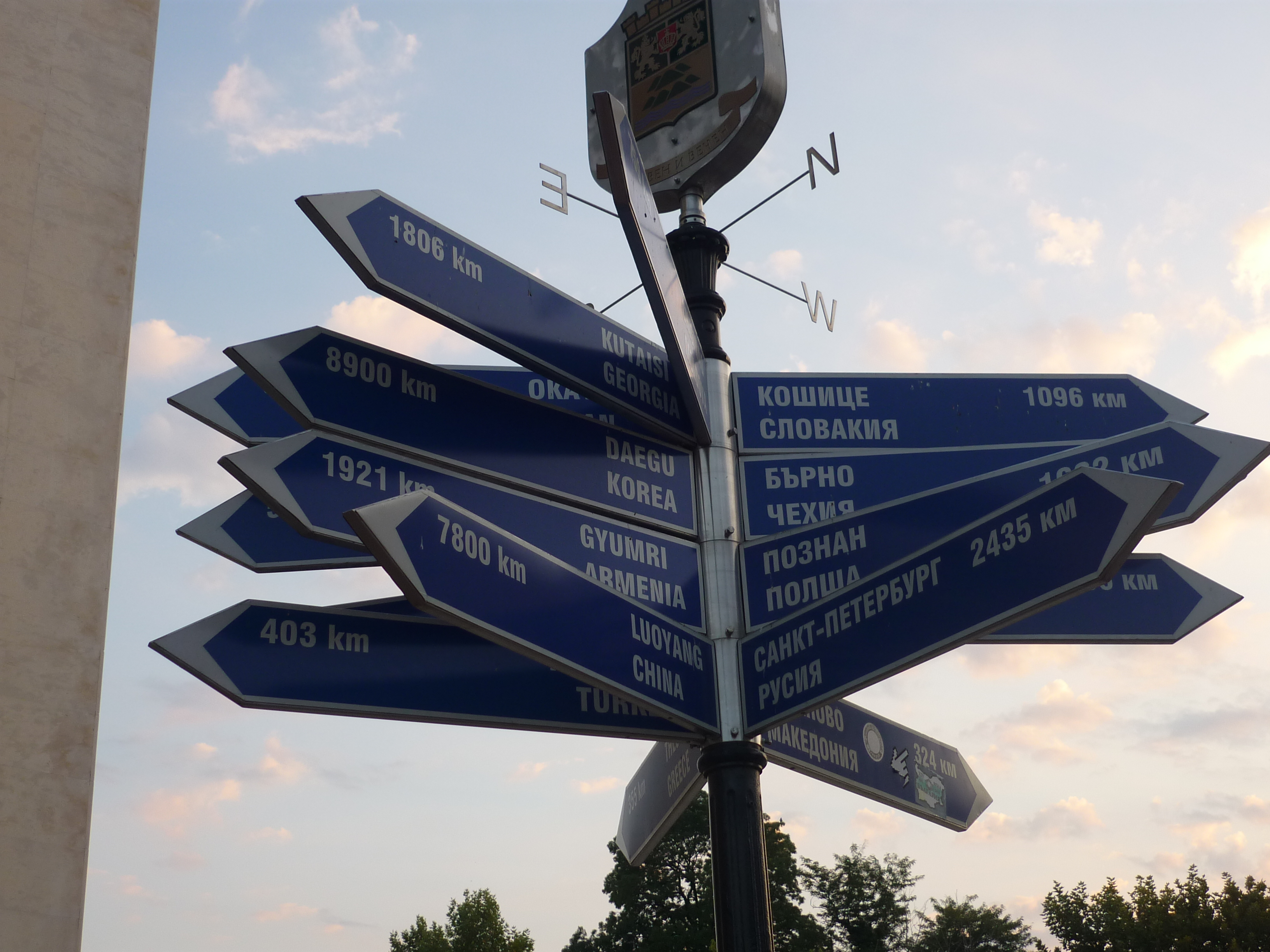
Twin towns of Plovdiv in 2011

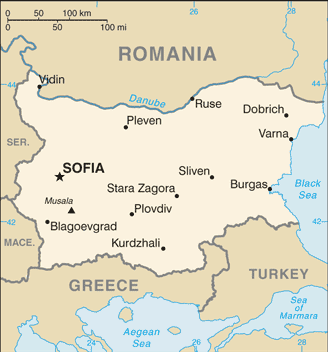
Map of Bulgaria

This is a list of municipalities in Bulgaria which have standing links to local communities in other countries known as "town twinning" (usually in Europe) or "sister cities" (usually in the rest of the world).

== A ==
Antonovo

- Beymelek (Demre), Turkey
- Roccafiorita, Italy

Asenovgrad

- Bergama, Turkey
- Denpasar, Indonesia
- Derinkuyu, Turkey
- Dimitrovgrad, Serbia
- Kilkis, Greece
- Naousa, Greece
- Nilüfer, Turkey
- Prilep, North Macedonia
- Stary Oskol, Russia

Aytos

- Silivri, Turkey
- Traismauer, Austria

== B ==
Balchik

- Boxberg, Germany
- Bran, Romania
- Cieszyn, Poland
- Galich, Russia
- Mangalia, Romania
- Stará Ľubovňa, Slovakia
- Tambov, Russia
- Valašské Meziříčí, Czech Republic

Bansko

- Kriva Palanka, North Macedonia
- Petroșani, Romania
- Triandria, Greece
- Zakopane, Poland

Belene

- Belleville-sur-Loire, France
- Devrek, Turkey
- Hajdúsámson, Hungary
- Lázně Bělohrad, Czech Republic
- Obninsk, Russia
- Popești-Leordeni, Romania
- Vigonza, Italy

Blagoevgrad

- Čakovec, Croatia
- Delčevo, North Macedonia
- Gornji Milanovac, Serbia
- Székesfehérvár, Hungary

Bolyarovo

- Kofçaz, Turkey
- Vyssa, Greece

Botevgrad

- Holbæk, Denmark
- Saransk, Russia

Burgas

- Alexandroupoli, Greece
- (Georgia (country)) Batumi, Georgia
- Gomel, Belarus
- Krasnodar, Russia
- Miskolc, Hungary
- Rijeka, Croatia
- Rotterdam, Netherlands
- South-Western AO (Moscow), Russia
- Ulsan, South Korea
- Vologda, Russia
- Yantai, China
- Yaroslavl, Russia

== D ==
Dimitrovgrad

- Blida, Algeria
- Darkhan, Mongolia
- Dimitrovgrad, Russia
- Eisenhüttenstadt, Germany
- Grosseto, Italy
- Jiaojiang (Taizhou), China
- Kalamaria, Greece
- Kazincbarcika, Hungary
- Nowa Huta (Kraków), Poland
- Pivdenne, Ukraine

Dobrich

- Białystok, Poland
- Golmud, China
- Izmail, Ukraine
- Kavadarci, North Macedonia
- Kırklareli, Turkey
- Nizhny Novgorod, Russia
- Nowy Sącz County, Poland
- Pervomaisk, Ukraine
- Pinsk, Belarus
- Saratov, Russia
- Schaffhausen, Switzerland
- Tambov, Russia
- Zalaegerszeg, Hungary

Dolni Chiflik

- Grünheide, Germany
- Izabelin, Poland
- Krynychne, Ukraine
- Vysoké Mýto, Czech Republic

Dupnitsa

- Bosilegrad, Serbia
- Bryansk, Russia
- Kriva Palanka, North Macedonia

Dve Mogili

- Altınova, Turkey
- Berovo, North Macedonia
- Bielsk Podlaski, Poland
- Bucșani, Romania
- Călărași, Moldova
- Prundu Bârgăului, Romania

== G ==
Gabrovo

- Aalst, Belgium
- Chernihiv, Ukraine
- Kumanovo, North Macedonia
- Mittweida, Germany
- Mogilev, Belarus
- Mytischi, Russia
- Nowy Sącz, Poland
- Panevėžys, Lithuania
- Petah Tikva, Israel
- Prešov, Slovakia
- Shaki, Azerbaijan
- Sisak, Croatia
- Thun, Switzerland

Gorna Oryahovitsa

- Artsyz, Ukraine
- Büyükçekmece, Turkey
- Cherepovets, Russia
- Myrhorod, Ukraine
- Narva, Estonia
- Roșiorii de Vede, Romania
- Smalyavichy, Belarus
- Statte, Italy
- Szigetszentmiklós, Hungary
- Waren an der Müritz, Germany

== H ==
Haskovo

- Châtillon-sur-Indre, France
- Edirne, Turkey
- Enguera, Spain
- Leicester, England, United Kingdom
- Shatura, Russia
- Viseu, Portugal

Hisarya

- Aiani, Greece
- Aleksinac, Serbia
- Hilsenheim, France

== I ==
Ivaylovgrad

- Kyprinos, Greece
- Longueau, France

== K ==
Kardzhali

- East Staffordshire, England, United Kingdom
- Edirne, Turkey
- Elkhart, United States
- Filippoi, Greece
- Komotini, Greece
- Osmangazi, Turkey
- Silivri, Turkey
- Soufli, Greece
- Tekirdağ, Turkey
- Vladimir, Russia

Karlovo

- Baranavichy, Belarus
- Bryansk, Russia
- Konin, Poland
- Vladimir, Russia

Kavarna

- Babadag, Romania
- Bosilegrad, Serbia
- Çiftlikköy, Turkey
- Csopak, Hungary
- Kaarma (Saaremaa), Estonia
- Kostrzyn nad Odrą, Poland
- Kruševo, North Macedonia
- Michalovce, Slovakia
- Năvodari, Romania
- Padenghe sul Garda, Italy
- Pefki, Greece
- Petit-Croix, France
- Piazzola sul Brenta, Italy
- Pivdenne, Ukraine
- Podolsk, Russia
- Prizren, Kosovo
- Shcherbinka (Moscow), Russia
- Skarżysko-Kamienna, Poland
- Stare Babice, Poland
- Štip, North Macedonia
- Szente, Hungary
- Zaječar, Serbia

Kazanlak

- Alexandria, Egypt
- Blida, Algeria
- Cazzago San Martino, Italy
- Cremona, Italy
- Grasse, France
- Jinan, China
- Jungnang (Seoul), South Korea
- Kočani, North Macedonia
- Luxor, Egypt
- Nagykanizsa, Hungary
- Saint-Herblain, France
- Târgoviște, Romania
- Tolyatti, Russia
- Veria, Greece

Kozloduy

- Bechet, Romania
- Bosilegrad, Serbia
- Calafat, Romania
- Copeland, England, United Kingdom

Kubrat

- Åmål, Sweden
- Mtsensk, Russia
- Skuodas, Lithuania
- Videle, Romania

Kyustendil

- Leskovac, Serbia
- Rechytsa, Belarus

== L ==
Lom

- Băilești, Romania
- Debar, North Macedonia
- Moudania, Greece
- Pantelej (Niš), Serbia

Lovech

- Berat, Albania
- Erfurt, Germany
- Iziaslav, Ukraine
- Kolašin, Montenegro
- Laval, France
- Lotoshinsky District, Russia
- Ryazan, Russia
- Syktyvkar, Russia

== M ==
Madan

- Avanos, Turkey
- İhsaniye, Turkey
- Nestos, Greece
- Pendik, Turkey
- Rieulay, France
- Süloğlu, Turkey

Montana

- Alpignano, Italy
- Banská Bystrica, Slovakia
- Białogard, Poland
- Caracal, Romania
- Dzerzhinsky, Russia
- Fontaine-Vercors, France
- Medijana (Niš), Serbia
- Pirot, Serbia
- Schmalkalden, Germany
- Vranje, Serbia
- Yinchuan, China
- Zhytomyr, Ukraine

== N ==
Nesebar

- Kotor, Montenegro
- (Georgia (country)) Mtskheta, Georgia
- Pestszentlőrinc-Pestszentimre (Budapest), Hungary
- Safranbolu, Turkey
- Zvyozdny gorodok, Russia

Nova Zagora

- Feres, Greece
- Petroșani, Romania

== P ==
Panagyurishte

- Kavadarci, North Macedonia
- Zhodzina, Belarus

Pavlikeni

- Boldești-Scăeni, Romania
- Leova, Moldova
- Łomża, Poland
- Pruzhany, Belarus
- Torrelodones, Spain

Pazardzhik

- Aerodrom (Skopje), North Macedonia
- Chekhov, Russia
- Salerno, Italy
- Al-Salt, Jordan
- Stavropol, Russia
- Thái Bình, Vietnam
- West Bend, United States

Pernik

- Balashikha, Russia
- Elektrostal, Russia
- Jenin, Palestine
- Kavadarci, North Macedonia
- Lausanne, Switzerland
- Lublin, Poland
- Luhansk, Ukraine
- Orosei, Italy
- Orsha, Belarus
- Ovar, Portugal
- Pantelej (Niš), Serbia
- Pardubice, Czech Republic
- Pyongsong, North Korea
- Rožaje, Montenegro

Petrich

- Istra, Russia
- Mioveni, Romania
- Serres, Greece

Pleven

- Agadir, Morocco
- Bitola, North Macedonia
- Brăila, Romania
- Brest, Belarus
- Bursa, Turkey
- Central AO (Moscow), Russia
- Charlottesville, United States
- Gandia, Spain
- Gornji Milanovac, Serbia
- Jinzhou, China
- Kaiserslautern, Germany
- Kavadarci, North Macedonia
- Mykolaiv, Ukraine
- Ponta Delgada, Portugal
- Płock, Poland
- Rostov-on-Don, Russia
- Volos, Greece
- Yangquan, China

Plovdiv

- Bursa, Turkey
- Changchun, China
- Columbia, United States
- Daegu, South Korea
- Gyumri, Armenia
- Istanbul, Turkey
- Jeddah, Saudi Arabia
- Kastoria, Greece
- Košice, Slovakia
- Kumanovo, North Macedonia
- Leskovac, Serbia
- Lviv, Ukraine
- Okayama, Japan
- Petra, Jordan
- Saint Petersburg, Russia
- Samarkand, Uzbekistan
- Shenzhen, China
- Thessaloniki, Greece
- Valencia, Venezuela
- Yekaterinburg, Russia

Pomorie

- Ajak, Hungary
- Gorodets, Russia
- Nea Anchialos, Greece
- Troitsk, Russia
- Yenice, Turkey

Provadia

- Bilhorod-Dnistrovskyi, Ukraine
- Rokiškis, Lithuania

== R ==
Razgrad

- Armagh, Northern Ireland, United Kingdom
- Avcılar, Turkey
- Călărași, Romania
- Châlons-en-Champagne, France
- Odunpazarı, Turkey
- Slobozia, Romania
- Wittenberge, Germany

Ruse

- Bijeljina, Bosnia and Herzegovina
- Giurgiu, Romania
- Huainan, China
- Peristeri, Greece
- Saint-Ouen-sur-Seine, France
- Trogir, Croatia
- Újbuda (Budapest), Hungary
- Volgograd, Russia

== S ==
Samokov

- Kostroma, Russia

Sandanski

- Ataşehir, Turkey
- Dzerzhinsky (Volgograd), Russia
- Freudenstadt, Germany
- Mělník, Czech Republic
- Novokosino (Moscow), Russia
- Thasos, Greece
- Voskresensk, Russia

Sevlievo

- Gevgelija, North Macedonia
- Legionowo, Poland
- Nanhai (Foshan), China
- Szentes, Hungary
- Valašské Meziříčí, Czech Republic

Shumen

- Barnaul, Russia
- Debrecen, Hungary
- Kherson, Ukraine
- Podolsk, Russia
- Tournai, Belgium
- Tulcea, Romania
- Zhengzhou, China

Silistra

- Călărași, Romania
- Dunaújváros, Hungary
- Khmelnytskyi, Ukraine
- Kikinda, Serbia
- Leskovac, Serbia
- Lüleburgaz, Turkey
- Promissão, Brazil
- Rzhev, Russia
- Sakuragawa, Japan
- Slobozia, Romania

Sliven

- Alba Iulia, Romania
- Chongqing, China
- Gera, Germany
- Jerash, Jordan
- Kaisariani, Greece
- Melitopol, Ukraine
- Pécs, Hungary
- Svietlahorsk, Belarus
- Taraclia, Moldova
- Tekirdağ, Turkey
- Ternopil, Ukraine
- Voronezh, Russia

Smolyan

- Controguerra, Italy
- Gostivar, North Macedonia
- Kispest (Budapest), Hungary
- Martinsicuro, Italy
- Michurinsk, Russia
- Motril, Spain
- Pendik, Turkey
- Suhl, Germany
- Võru, Estonia
- Xanthi, Greece
- Yalova, Turkey

Sofia

- Algiers, Algeria
- Amman, Jordan
- Ankara, Turkey
- Bucharest, Romania
- Doha, Qatar
- Ho Chi Minh City, Vietnam
- Kyiv, Ukraine
- Pittsburgh, United States
- Shanghai, China
- (Georgia (country)) Tbilisi, Georgia
- Tel Aviv, Israel
- Zagreb, Croatia

Sozopol

- Alushta, Ukraine
- Sighișoara, Romania

Stara Zagora

- Barreiro, Portugal
- Larissa, Greece
- Radom, Poland
- Samara, Russia
- Yueyang, China

Strelcha

- Bleicherode, Germany
- Călimănești, Romania
- Orneta, Poland
- Yessentuki, Russia

Strumyani

- Kuşadası, Turkey
- Târgu Mureș, Romania

Sungurlare

- Jastrebarsko, Croatia

Svilengrad

- Didymoteicho, Greece
- Feres, Greece
- Lefortovo (Moscow), Russia
- Oebisfelde-Weferlingen, Germany
- Soufli, Greece
- Uzunköprü, Turkey

Svishtov

- Barcelos, Portugal
- Bijelo Polje, Montenegro
- Dębica, Poland
- Frigento, Italy
- Hrubieszów, Poland
- Ismailia, Egypt
- Kapuvár, Hungary
- Kremenchuk, Ukraine
- Ludza, Latvia
- Nafpaktos, Greece
- Prijepolje, Serbia
- Veles, North Macedonia
- Videle, Romania
- Zheleznogorsk, Russia

Svoge is a member of the Charter of European Rural Communities, a town twinning association across the European Union. Svoge also has two other twin towns.

Charter of European Rural Communities

- Bienvenida, Spain
- Bièvre, Belgium
- Bucine, Italy
- (Republic of Ireland) Cashel, Ireland
- Cissé, France
- Desborough, England, United Kingdom
- Esch (Haaren), Netherlands
- Hepstedt, Germany
- Ibănești, Romania
- Kandava (Tukums), Latvia
- Kannus, Finland
- Kolindros, Greece
- Lassee, Austria
- Medzev, Slovakia
- Næstved, Denmark
- Nagycenk, Hungary
- Nadur, Malta
- Ockelbo, Sweden
- Pano Lefkara, Cyprus
- Põlva, Estonia
- Samuel (Soure), Portugal
- Starý Poddvorov, Czech Republic
- Strzyżów, Poland
- Tisno, Croatia
- Troisvierges, Luxembourg
- Žagarė (Joniškis), Lithuania

Other

- Novi Grad, Bosnia and Herzegovina
- Stupava, Slovakia

== T ==
Targovishte

- Cottbus, Germany
- Kozani, Greece
- Santa Maria da Feira, Portugal
- Smolensk, Russia
- Târgoviște, Romania
- Waterloo, United States

Troyan

- Dojran, North Macedonia
- Ellwangen, Germany
- Pernes-les-Fontaines, France
- Vigneux-sur-Seine, France

Tryavna is a member of the Douzelage, a town twinning association of towns across the European Union. Tryavna also has three other twin towns.

Douzelage

- Agros, Cyprus
- Altea, Spain
- Asikkala, Finland
- Bad Kötzting, Germany
- Bellagio, Italy
- (Republic of Ireland) Bundoran, Ireland
- Chojna, Poland
- Granville, France
- Holstebro, Denmark
- Houffalize, Belgium
- Judenburg, Austria
- Kőszeg, Hungary
- Marsaskala, Malta
- Meerssen, Netherlands
- Niederanven, Luxembourg
- Oxelösund, Sweden
- Preveza, Greece
- Rokiškis, Lithuania
- Rovinj, Croatia
- Sesimbra, Portugal
- Sherborne, England, United Kingdom
- Sigulda, Latvia
- Siret, Romania
- Škofja Loka, Slovenia
- Sušice, Czech Republic
- Türi, Estonia
- Zvolen, Slovakia

Other

- Brienz, Switzerland
- Vinica, North Macedonia
- Żyrardów, Poland

Tundzha

- Madaba, Jordan
- Slonim, Belarus
- Warta, Poland

Tvarditsa

- Soroksár (Budapest), Hungary

== V ==
Varna

- Aalborg, Denmark
- Aqaba, Jordan
- Cape Town, South Africa
- Dordrecht, Netherlands
- Kharkiv, Ukraine
- Malmö, Sweden
- Ningbo, China
- Novorossiysk, Russia
- Novosibirsk, Russia
- Odesa, Ukraine
- Piraeus, Greece
- Rostock, Germany
- Surabaya, Indonesia
- Turku, Finland
- Urmia, Iran

Veliko Tarnovo

- Asti, Italy
- Bitola, North Macedonia
- Braga, Portugal
- Bursa, Turkey
- Cetinje, Montenegro
- Colonia Tovar, Venezuela
- Iaşi, Romania
- Al-Karak, Jordan
- Nakhchivan, Azerbaijan
- Niš, Serbia
- Serres, Greece
- Tarxien, Malta
- Toledo, Spain
- Tver, Russia

Velingrad

- Maladzyechna, Belarus
- Silivri, Turkey
- Stupino, Russia
- Yakutsk, Russia

Vidin

- Calafat, Romania
- Demre, Turkey
- Hódmezővásárhely, Hungary
- Rivne, Ukraine
- West Carrollton, United States
- Zaječar, Serbia

Vratsa

- Bor, Serbia
- Craiova, Romania
- Frankfurt an der Oder, Germany
- Kičevo, North Macedonia
- Kobryn, Belarus
- Sumy, Ukraine
- Villeneuve-le-Roi, France

== Y ==
Yambol

- Berdiansk, Ukraine
- Edirne, Turkey
- Izhevsk, Russia
- Sieradz, Poland
- Târgu-Jiu, Romania
- Villejuif, France

== Z ==
Zlatograd

- Chrysoupoli, Greece
