= Bièvre =

Bièvre may refer to:

- Bièvre (river), river in France
- Bièvre, Belgium, municipality in the province of Namur
