= Tyinda =

Ancient Lycian town

Coordinates: 36°14′14″N 29°43′52″E

Tyinda was a town of ancient Lycia, between Cyaneae and Phellus. The name is not attested in history, but is derived from epigraphic and other evidence.

Its site is located near the modern town of Bağlıca, Asiatic Turkey.
