= Çevreli, Demre =

Çevreli
- Neighbourhood
- Location in Turkey
- Coordinates: 36.2182°N 29.8372°E
- Country: Turkey
- Province: Antalya
- District: Demre
- Population (2022): 786
- Time zone: UTC+3 (TRT)

Çevreli is a neighbourhood in the municipality and district of Demre, Antalya Province, Turkey. Its population is 786 (2022).
