= List of protected heritage sites in Bièvre =

This table shows an overview of the protected heritage sites in the Walloon town Bièvre. This list is part of Belgium's national heritage.

Object	Year/architect	Town/section	Address	Coordinates	Number^{?}	Image
Tower of the Church of Saint-Denis ^{(nl)} ^{(fr)}		Bièvre	Graide	49.951209°N 5.067122°E	91015-CLT-0001-01 Info	Toren kerk Saint-Denis More images
Ensemble of Foy-Notre-Dame chapel, two lime trees and the surrounding area ^{(nl)} ^{(fr)}		Bièvre		49.888488°N 5.020947°E	91015-CLT-0002-01 Info	
Church of Saint-Hubert and interior furnishings ^{(nl)} ^{(fr)}		Bièvre	Oizy	49.894029°N 5.008428°E	91015-CLT-0003-01 Info	Kerk Saint-Hubert en zijn meubilair More images
Fontain of Saint-Furcy and the ensemble of the fountain and its surroundings ^{(nl)} ^{(fr)}		Bièvre	Bellefontaine	49.914881°N 4.968905°E	91015-CLT-0005-01 Info	Fontaine Saint-Furcy en het ensemble van de fontein en haar omgeving

== See also ==
- List of protected heritage sites in Namur (province)
