= Kaleüçağız, Demre =

Kaleüçağız
- Neighbourhood
- Location in Turkey
- Coordinates: 36°12′N 29°51′E
- Country: Turkey
- Province: Antalya
- District: Demre
- Population (2022): 517
- Time zone: UTC+3 (TRT)

Kaleüçağız is a neighbourhood in the municipality and district of Demre, Antalya Province, Turkey. Its population is 517 (2022).
