= Köşkerler, Demre =

Köşkerler
- Neighbourhood
- Location in Turkey
- Coordinates: 36°16′27″N 29°59′51″E
- Country: Turkey
- Province: Antalya
- District: Demre
- Population (2022): 2,282
- Time zone: UTC+3 (TRT)

Köşkerler is a neighbourhood in the municipality and district of Demre, Antalya Province, Turkey. Its population is 2,282 (2022).

Köşkerler is 3 kilometres (2 mi) from the town of Demre. The provincial capital Antalya is 145 kilometres (90 mi) away.

The village's economy is based on agriculture. Oranges, peppers, cucumbers, tomatoes are the principal crops grown in the village.
