= Çağman, Demre =

Çağman
- Neighbourhood
- Country: Turkey
- Province: Antalya
- District: Demre
- Population (2022): 228
- Time zone: UTC+3 (TRT)

Çağman is a neighbourhood in the municipality and district of Demre, Antalya Province, Turkey. Its population is 228 (2022).
