= Gürses, Demre =

Gürses
- Neighbourhood
- Country: Turkey
- Province: Antalya
- District: Demre
- Population (2022): 383
- Time zone: UTC+3 (TRT)

Gürses is a neighbourhood in the municipality and district of Demre, Antalya Province, Turkey. Its population is 383 (2022).
