= Belören, Demre =

Belören
- Neighbourhood
- Location in Turkey
- Coordinates: 36.3076°N 29.9743°E
- Country: Turkey
- Province: Antalya
- District: Demre
- Population (2022): 481
- Time zone: UTC+3 (TRT)

Belören is a neighbourhood in the municipality and district of Demre, Antalya Province, Turkey. Its population is 481 (2022).
