= Davazlar, Demre =

Davazlar
- Neighbourhood
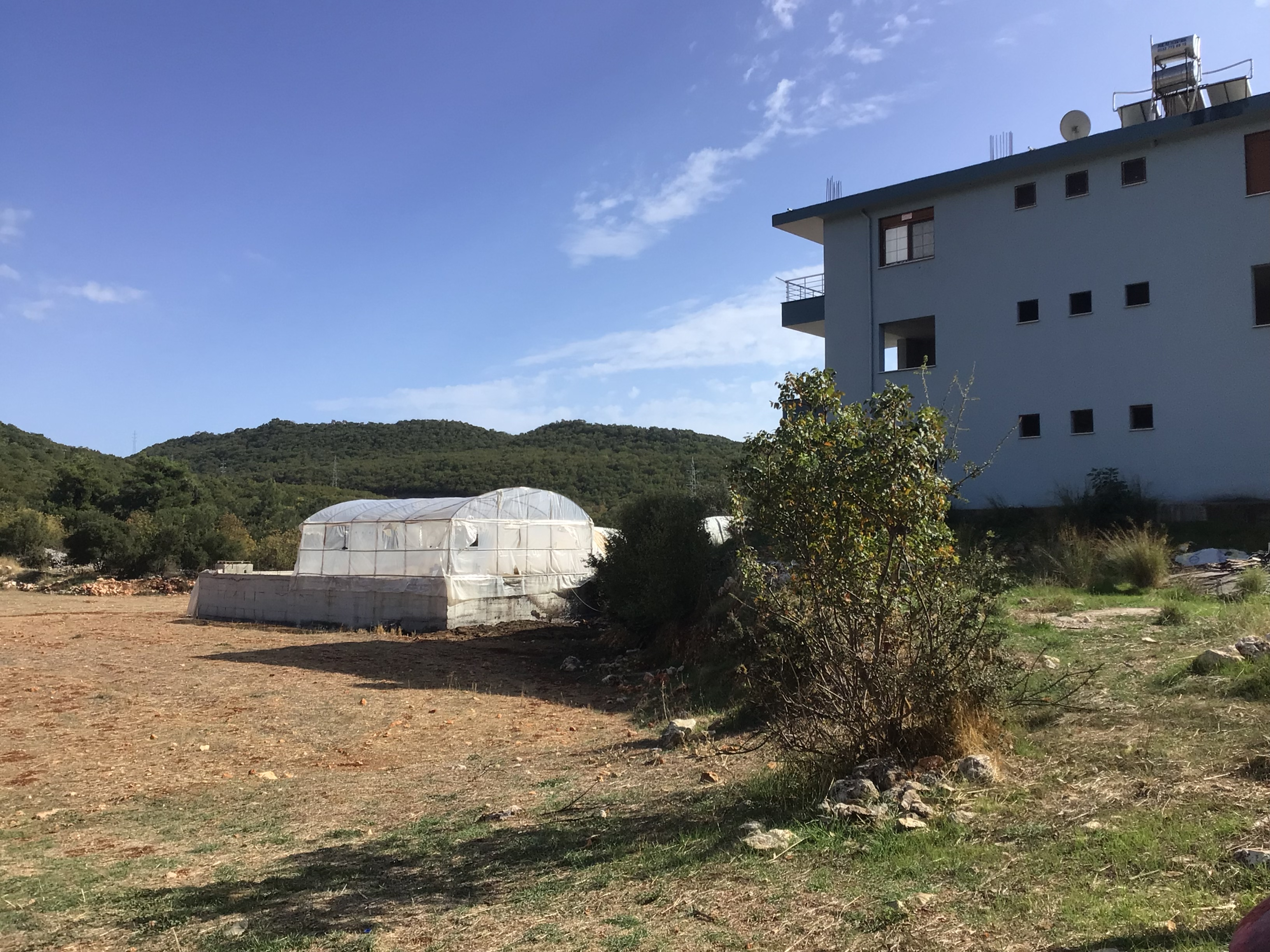

- Location within Turkey
- Country: Turkey
- Province: Antalya
- District: Demre
- Population (2022): 116
- Time zone: UTC+3 (TRT)

Davazlar is a neighbourhood in the municipality and district of Demre, Antalya Province, Turkey Its population is 116 (2022).

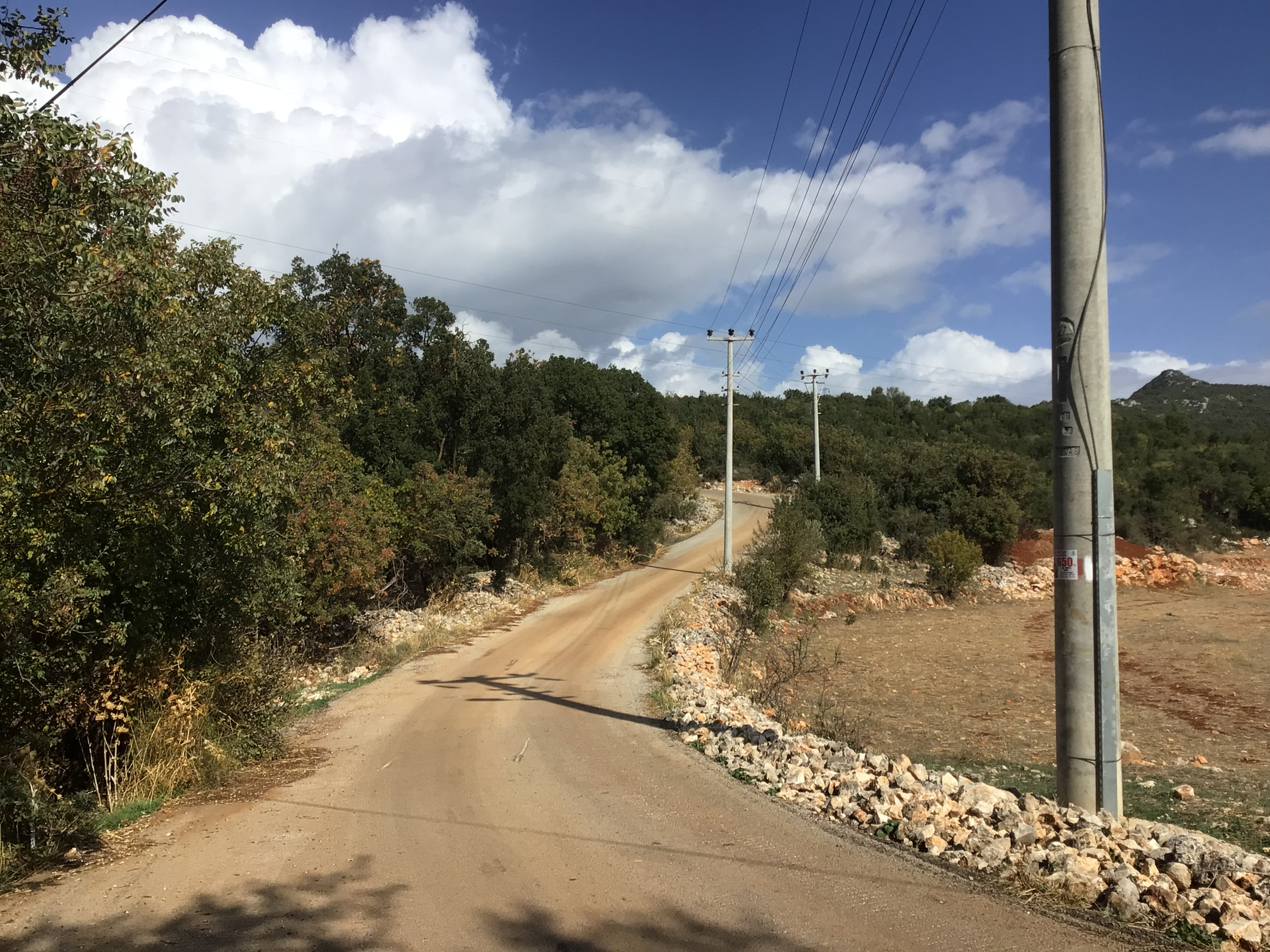
Another view from the Main Street in Davazlar.

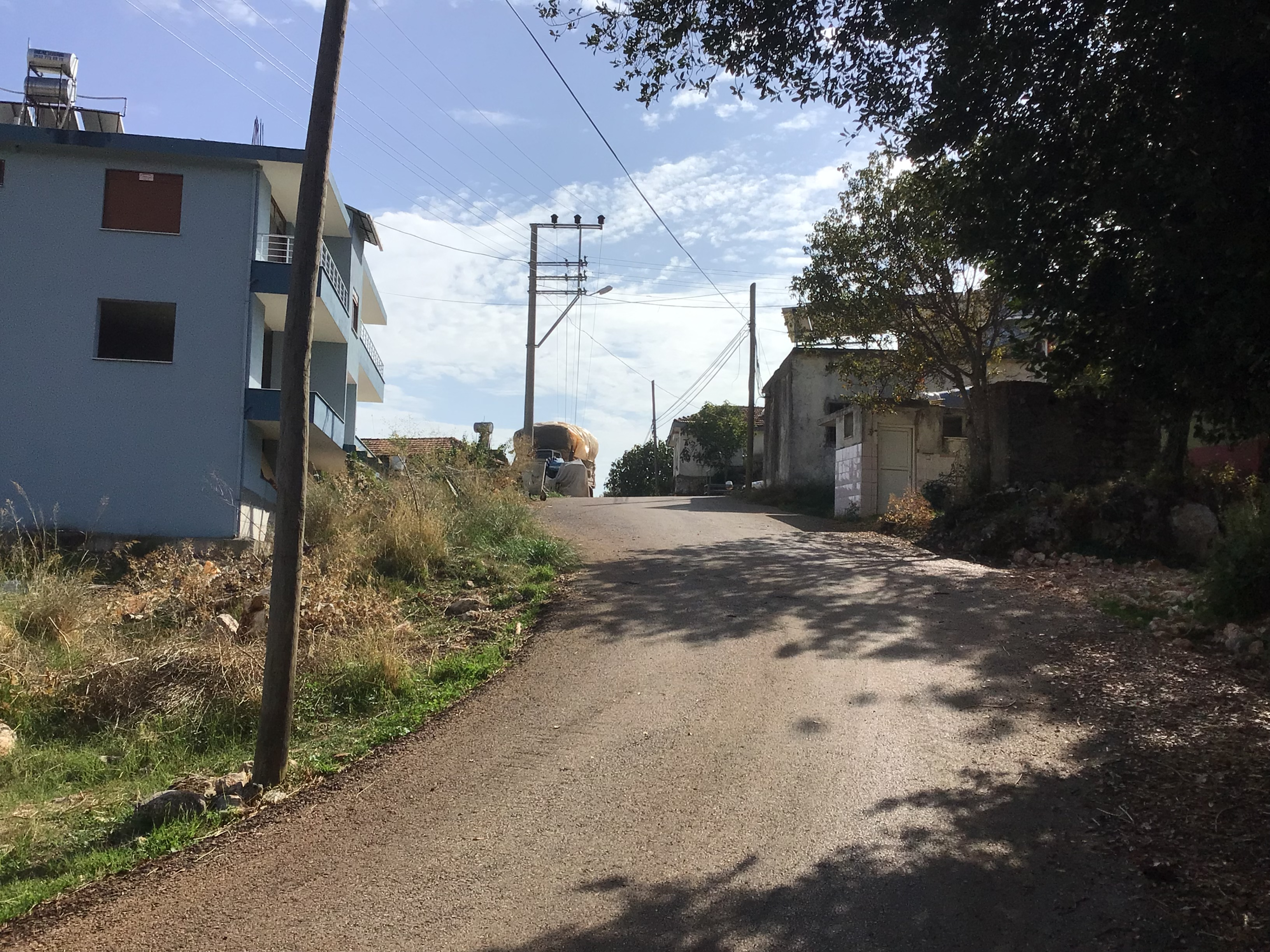
The Main Street in Davazlar.
