= Cyaneae =

Human settlement

- 𐊜𐊂𐊀𐊏 (Lycian); Xban-
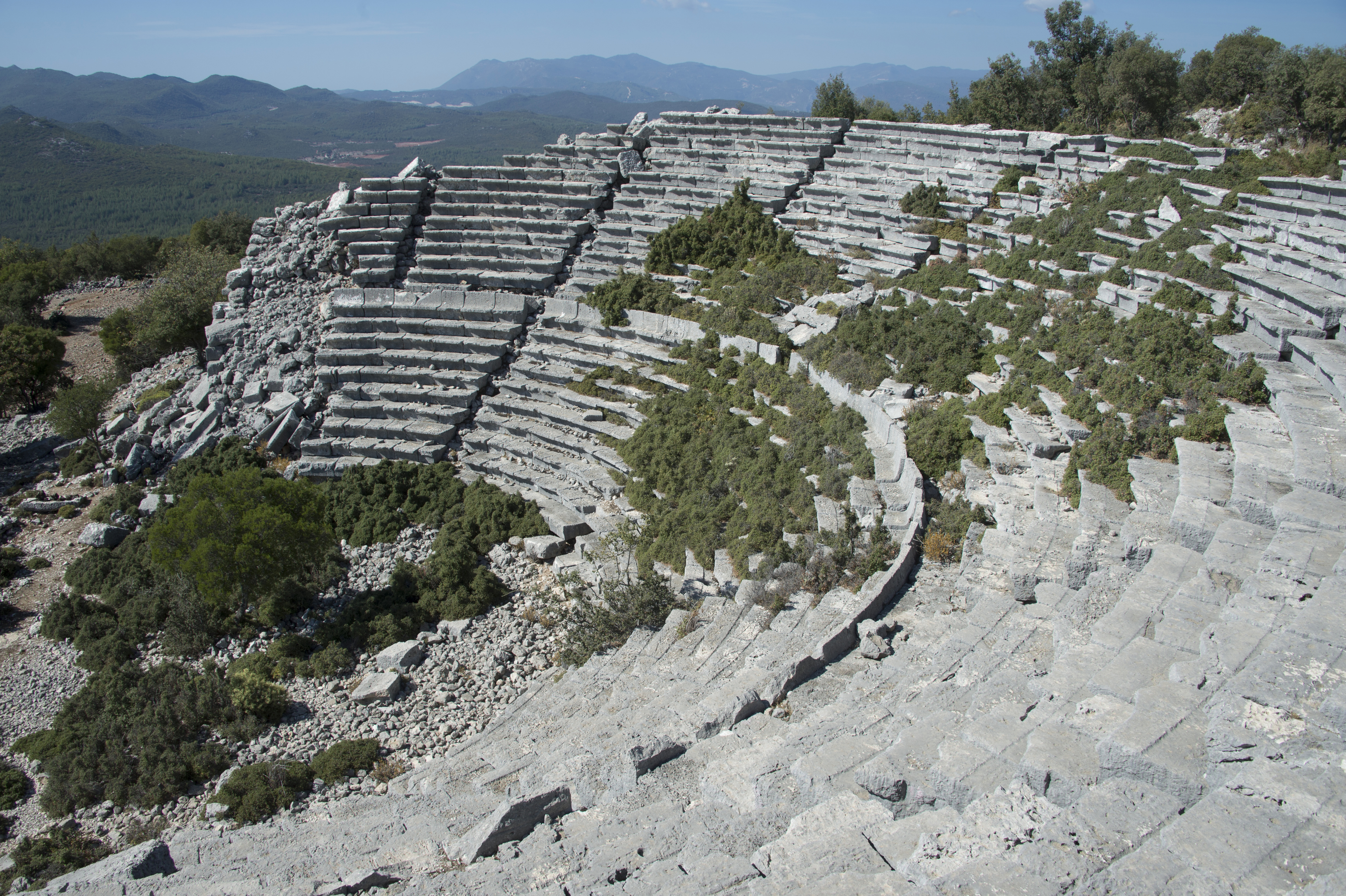
- Theatre at Cyaneae

- Location within Turkey
- 36°15′03″N 29°48′20″E
- Type: Settlement
- Location: Antalya Province, Turkey
- Region: Lycia

Site notes
- Condition: In ruins

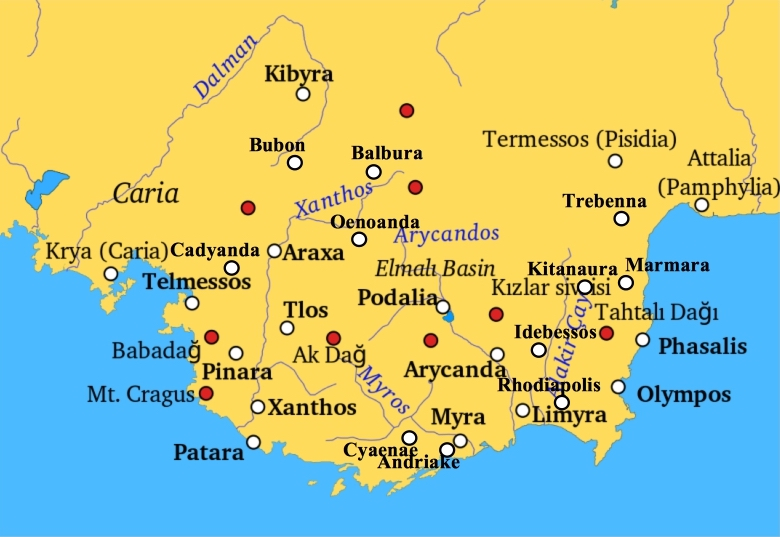
Cities of ancient Lycia. Red dots: mountain peaks, white dots: ancient cities

Cyaneae (Ancient Greek: Κυανέαι, [ky.a.né.ai̯]; Lycian: 𐊜𐊂𐊀𐊏 Xban-), also spelled Kyaneai or Cyanae, was a town of ancient Lycia, or perhaps three towns known collectively by the name. Leake observes that in some copies of Pliny it is written Cyane; in Hierocles and the Notitiae Episcopatuum it is Cyaneae.

To Spratt and Forbes, Cyaneae appeared to be a city ranking in importance with Phellus and Candyba, but in a better state of preservation. No longer a residential bishopric, Cyanae is today listed by the Catholic Church as a titular see.

Pausanias wrote that the oracle of Apollo Thyrxeus (Ἀπόλλων Θυρξεύς) was there.

== Discovery ==
Leake says that its remains were discovered west of Andriaca. The site at the head of Port Tristomo was confirmed by an inscription.

It is said in Spratt and Forbes: Cyaneae is located on the high table land between port Tristomo and the inland valley of Kassabar; we found three ancient sites, which, from the inscriptions copied at each, appeared to be severally—or perhaps collectively—styled Cyaneae. At one of these places, called Tousa, a sarcophagus contained the feminine ethnic name Κυανειτις, if it is copied right. A pedestal found at another place, called Yarvu, contains a Greek inscription of the Roman period, with the usual formula, Κυανειτων ἡ Βουλη και ὁ Δημος. And at a third place, named Ghiouristan, a Greek inscription contained the form Κυανειτων: and it is added,--the words Κυανειτων γερουσια occur in the inscription on a sarcophagus at the same locality.

It is singular that three distinct sites seem to have had the name Cyaneae, for the plural form appears to be the genuine name of the place. Yarvu, which seems to be the chief place, is due north of the head of the port Tristomo: Ghiouristan is due north of Yarvu, and about 3 miles distant, according to the map in Spratt and Forbes's work. Tousa is west-northwest of Yarvu, and further distant than Ghiouristan. Yarvu is on a high platform, with a steep descent on two sides. The walls are in a good state of preservation, and from 5 to 15 feet high. There is a theatre 165 feet in diameter, many plain rock tombs, groups of sarcophagi, and confused heaps of ruins. The remains are of the Roman and middle age construction; and some of a doubtful age. There were none of the earlier Lycian tombs and inscriptions. At Tousa a Lycian inscription was found. The city was small, and surrounded by a rudely constructed Hellenic wall, very perfect in some parts, combining the polygonal and cyclopean styles in its construction.

Tousa is nearly 5 hours from the sea. At Ghiouristan there are three Lycian rock tombs, one of which has a Lycian and Greek inscription. There are many tombs and sarcophagi here.

This is another example of the discovery of Lycian towns of which no historical record has been preserved except the names. It is not easy to conjecture why all these places had the same name, But it is very possible that one of them, Yarvu, was the chief place under the name of Cyaneae; and that the other two, which belonged to Cyaneae, might have other names, and yet be considered as dependent on the chief place, and might be comprehended under the same name.

== Gallery ==
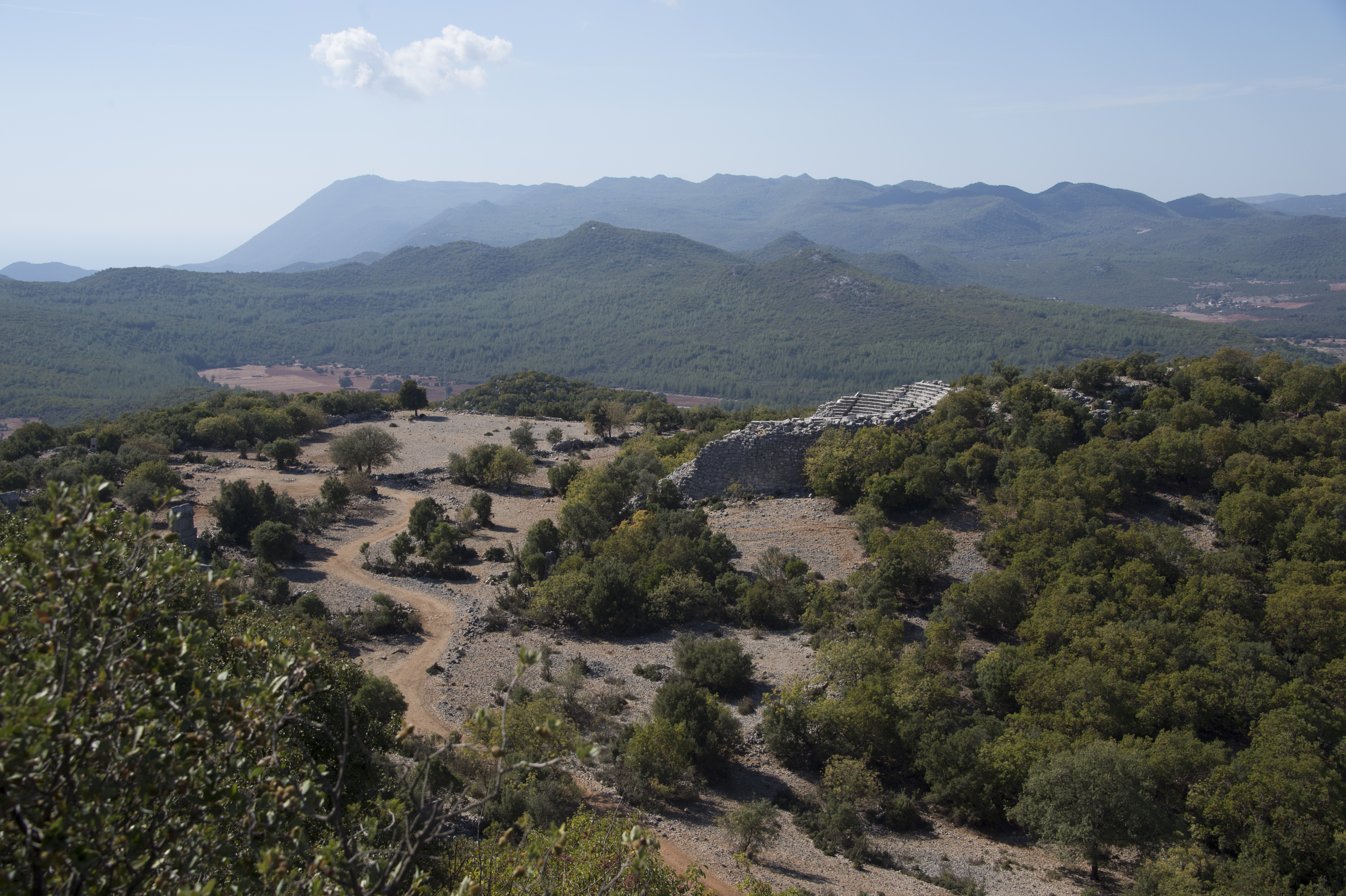
Cyaneae Theatre from high

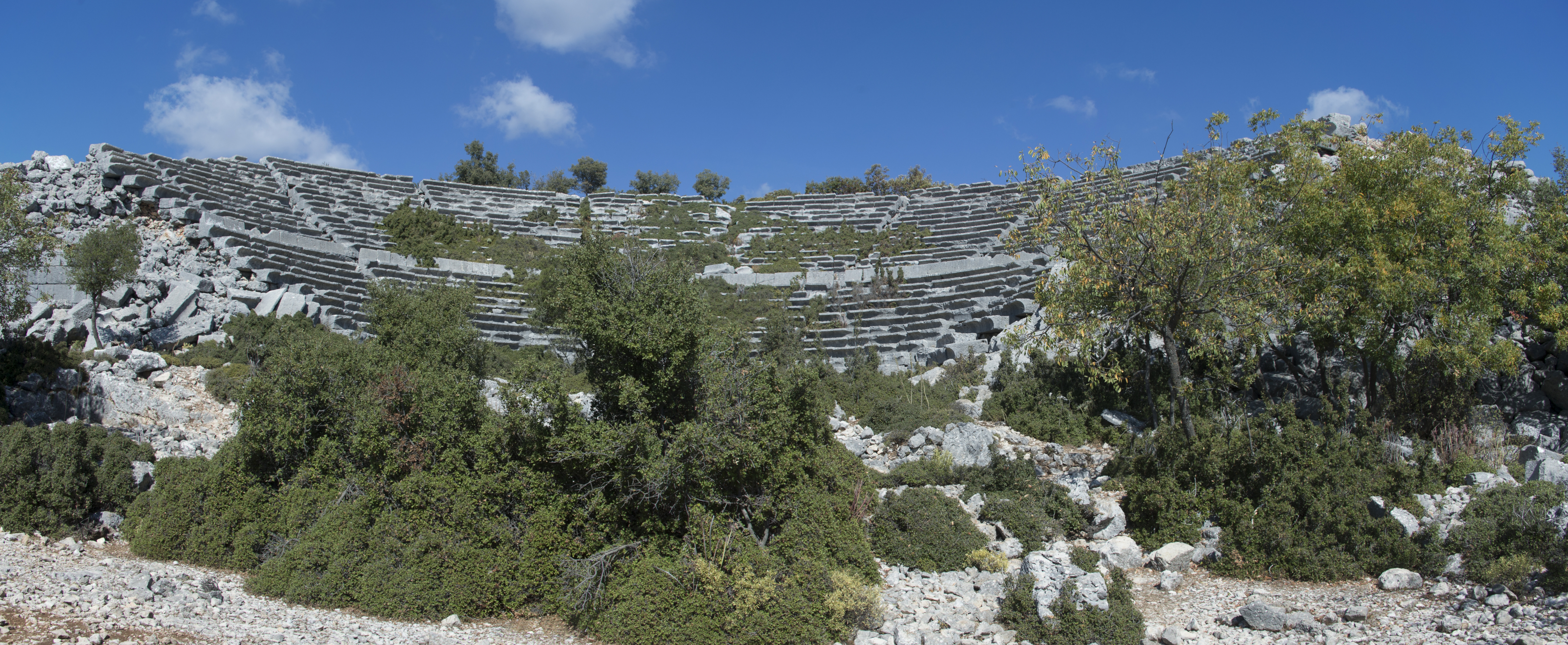

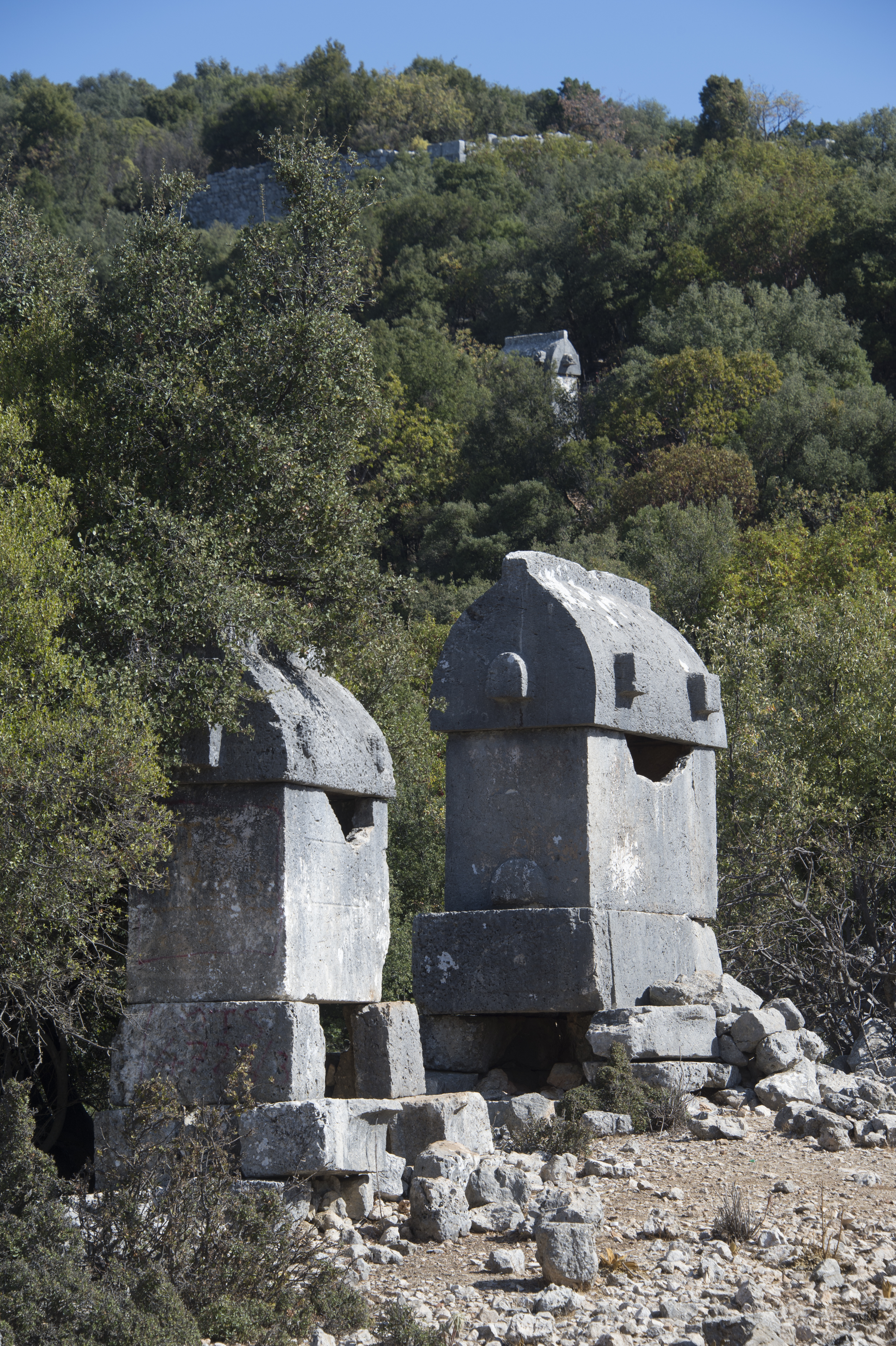
Cyaneae Necropolis

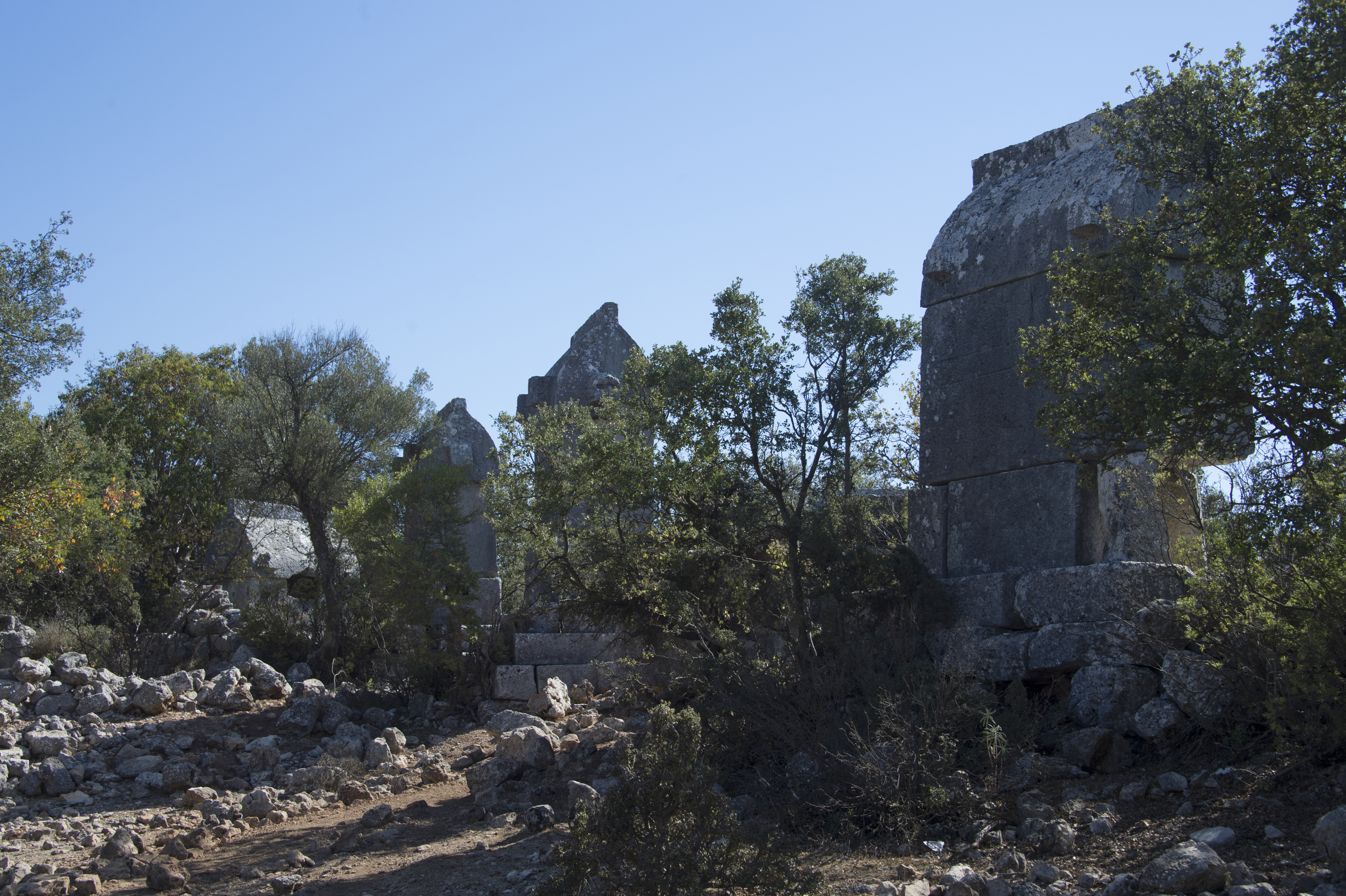
Cyaneae Necropolis

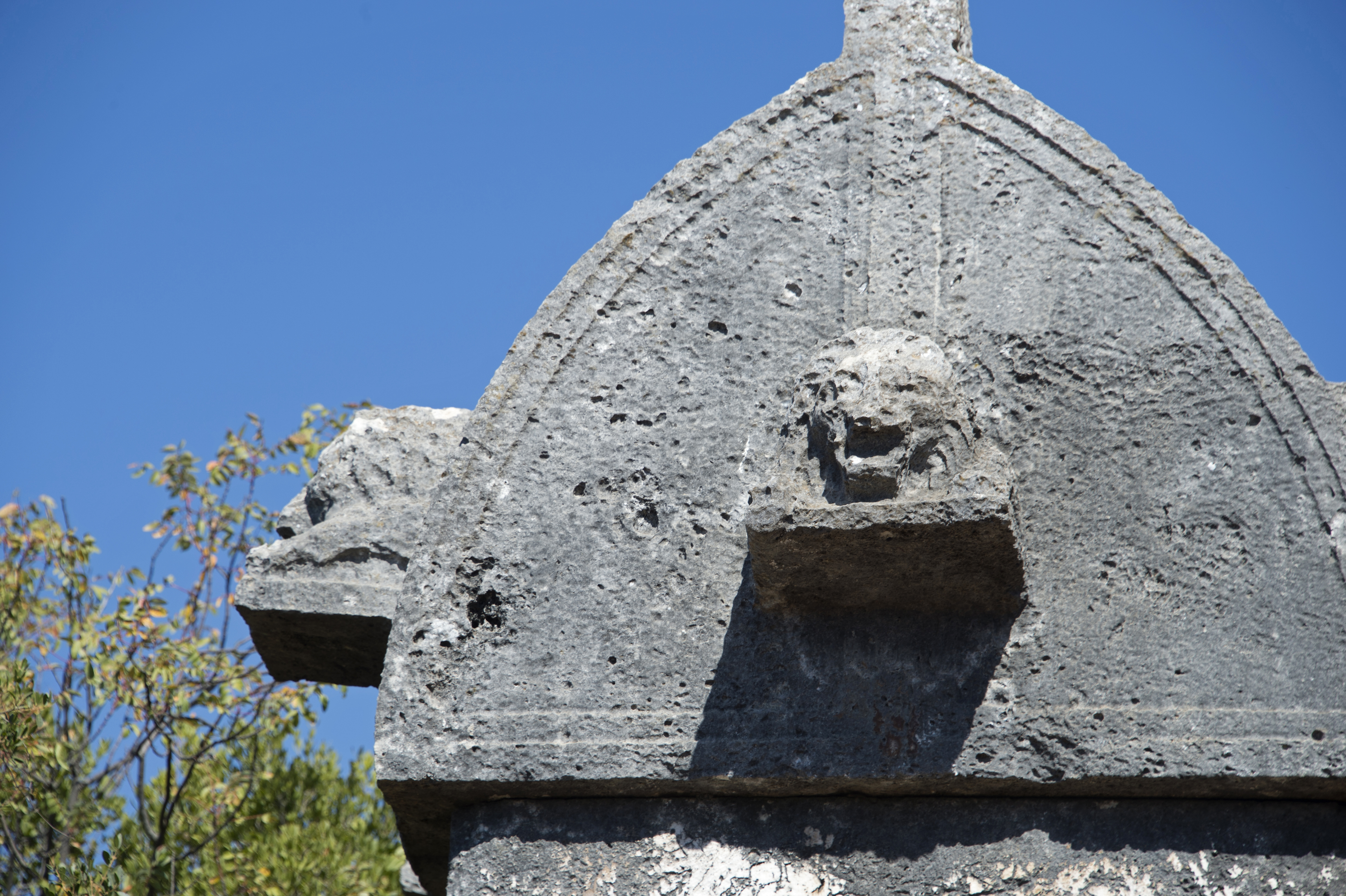
Cyaneae Necropolis Detail of tomb

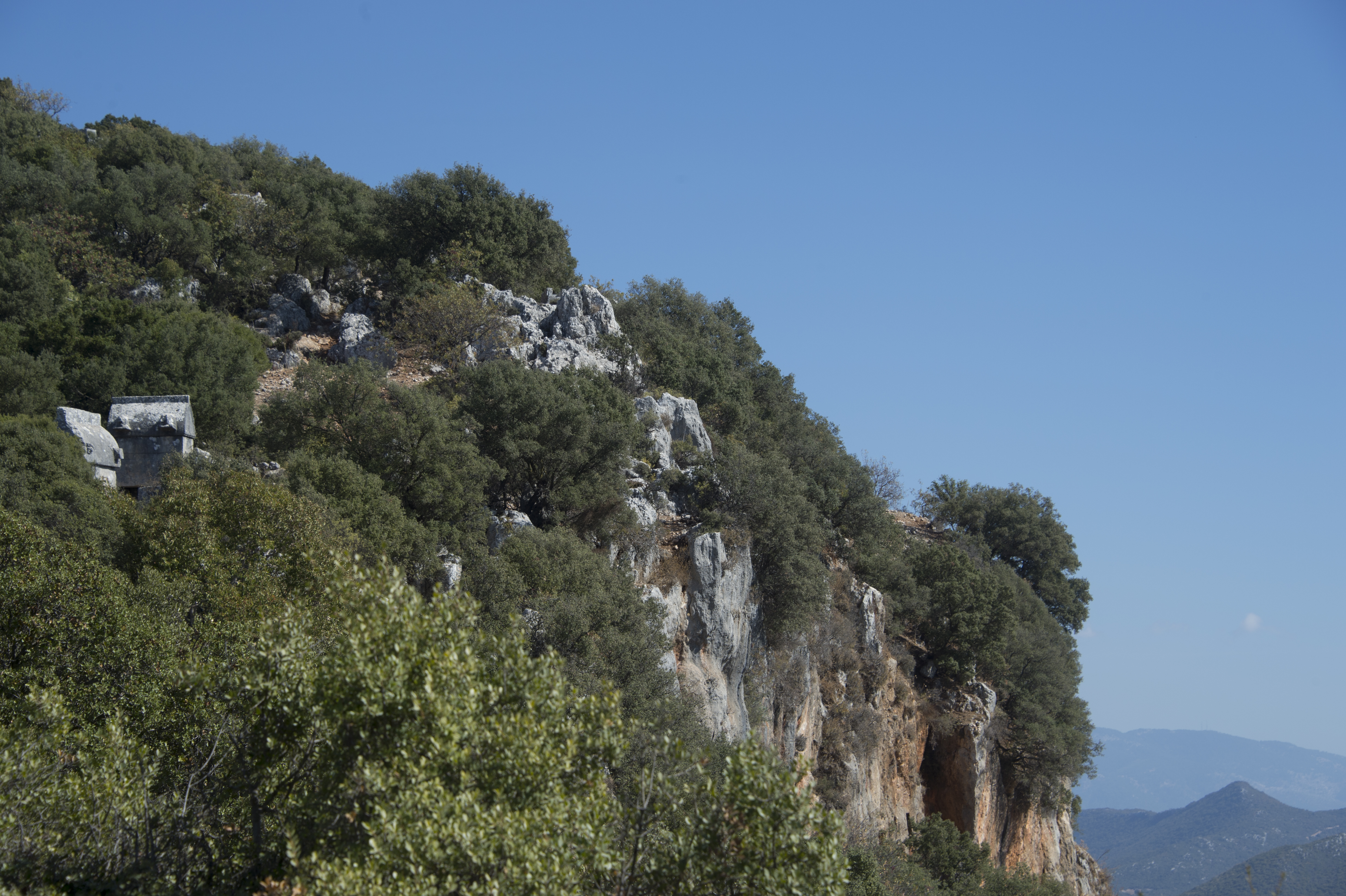
Cyaneae Necropolis

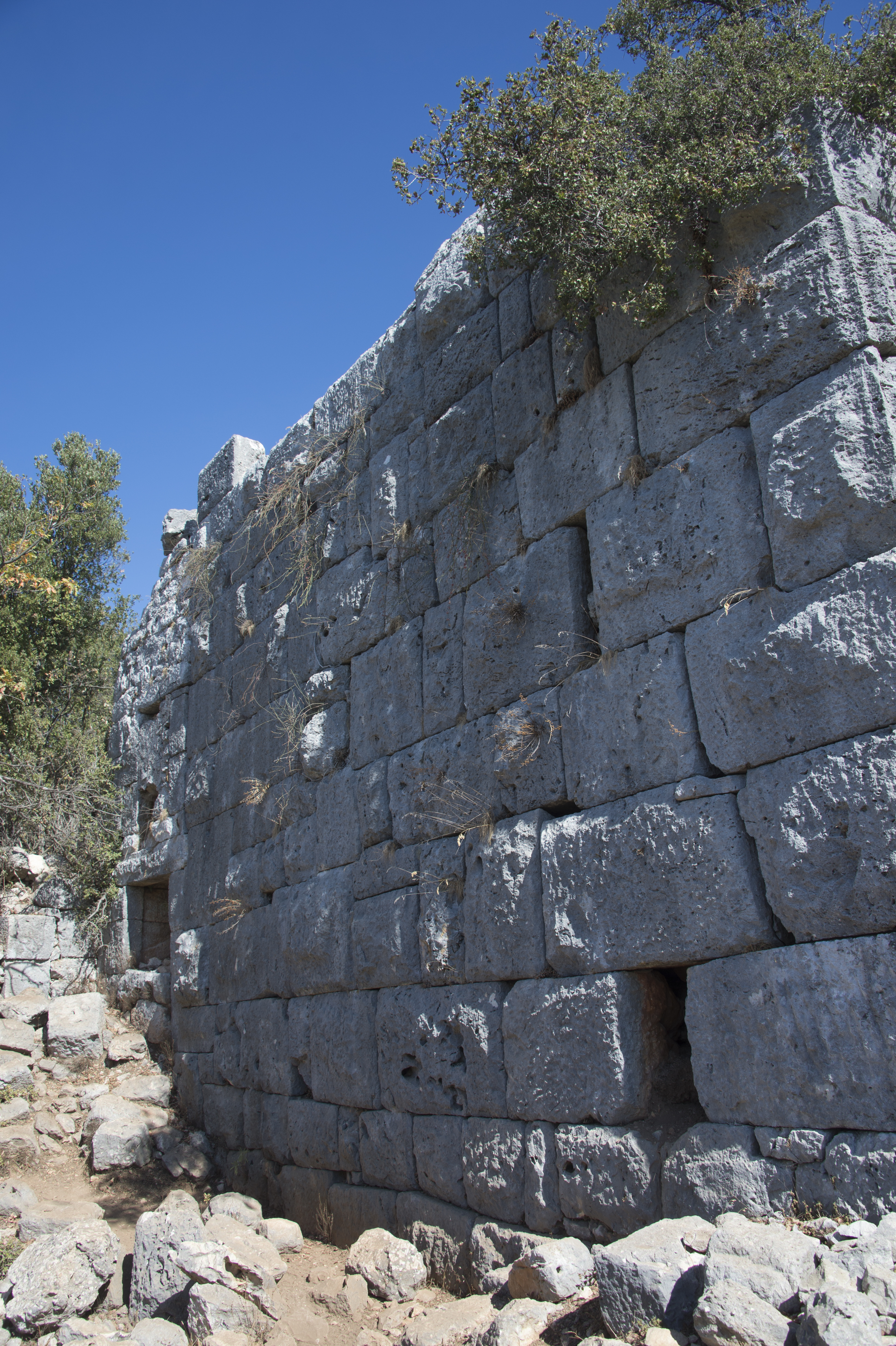
Cyaneae Acropolis area

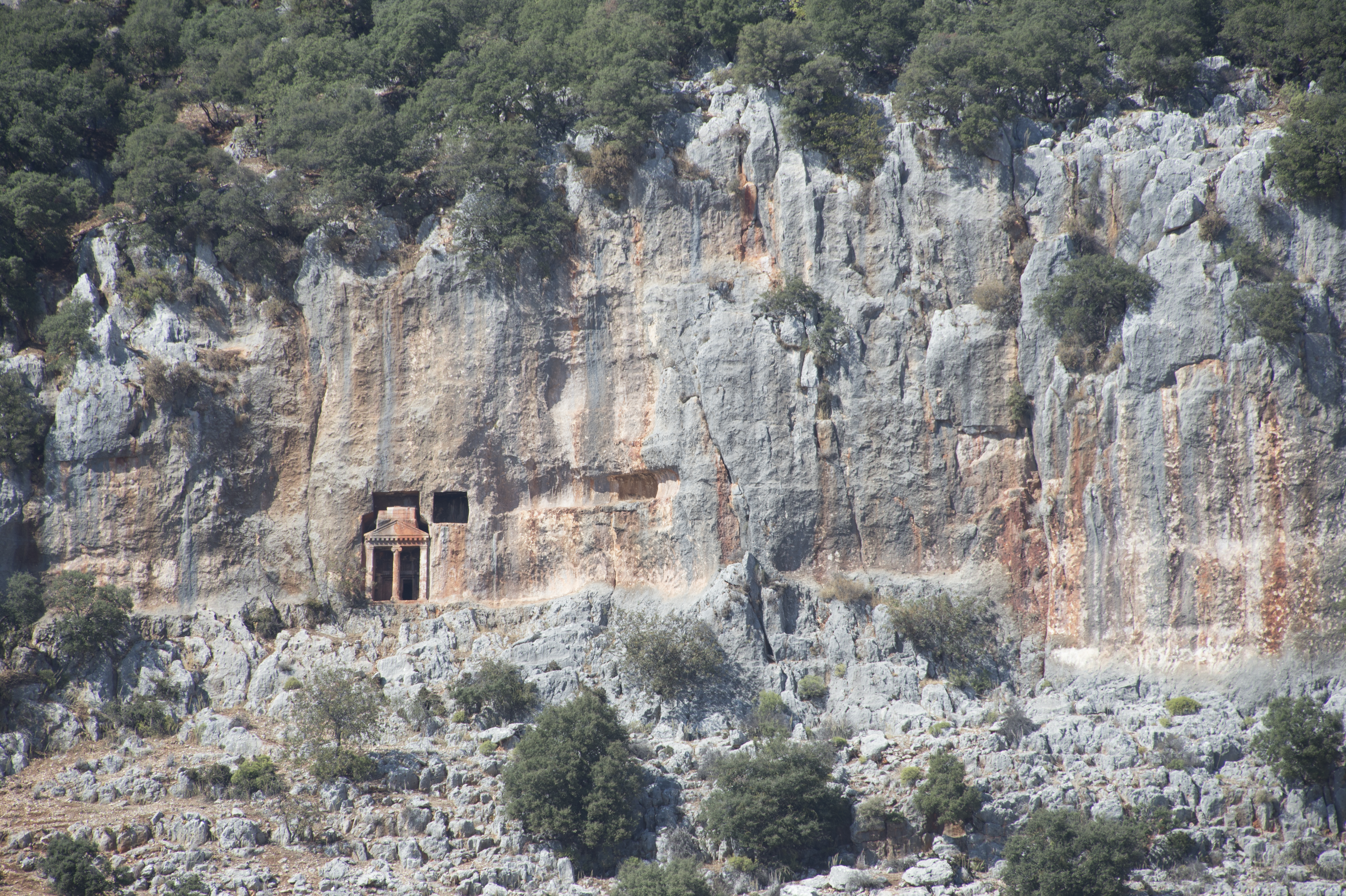
Cyaneae Rock Temple tomb

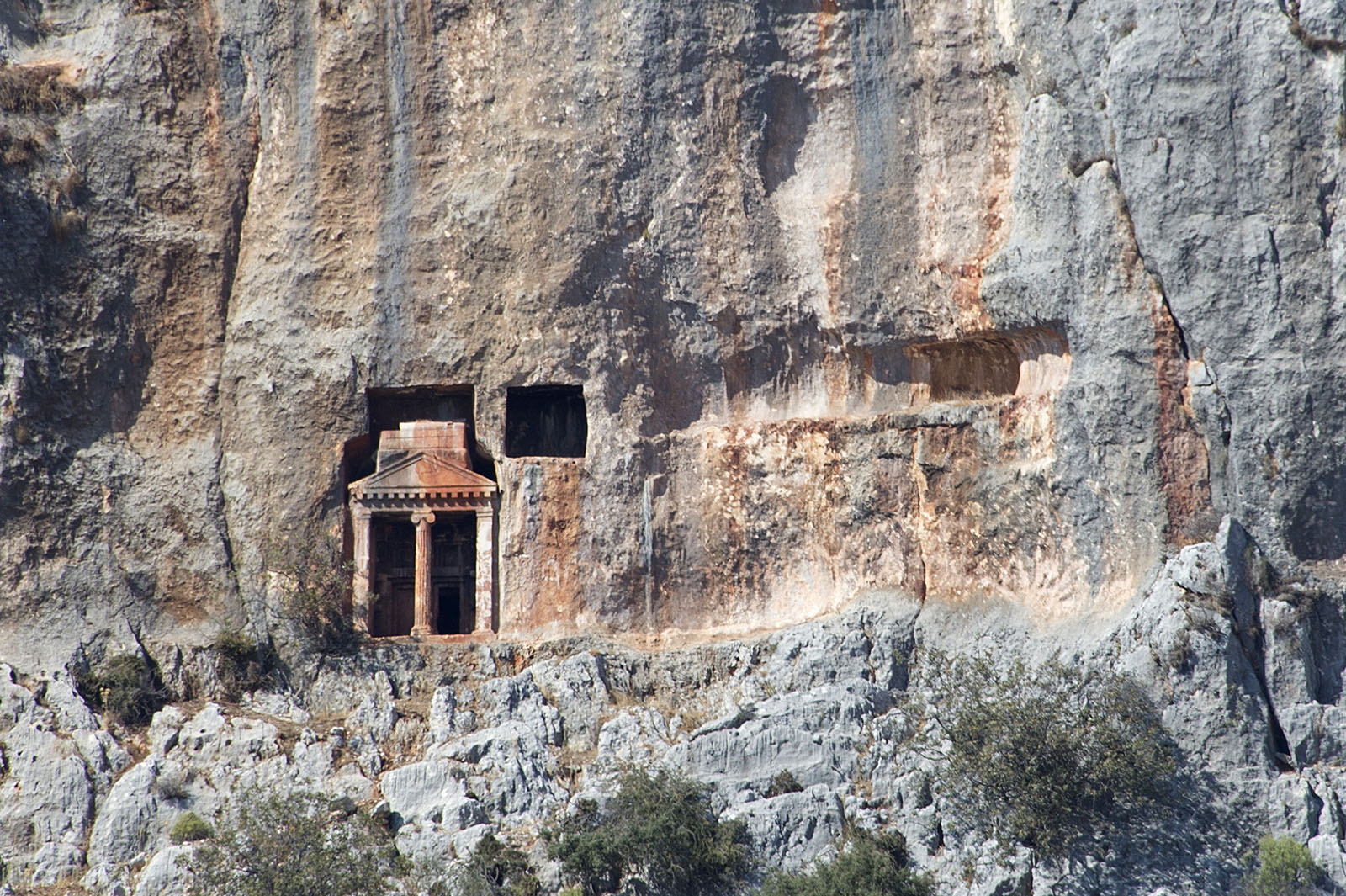
Cyaneae Rock Temple tomb

== Bishopric ==
In the Notitia Episcopatuum of Pseudo-Epiphanius, written in about 640 under Byzantine Emperor Heraclius, the bishopric of Cyanae is ranked 15th among the suffragans of the metropolitan see of Myra, the capital of Lycia. There are no extant records of the names of bishops of the see.

No longer a residential bishopric, Cyanae is listed by the Greek Orthodox Archdiocese of Australia and Catholic Church as a titular see. Bishop Elpidios of Perth and Kyaneon was ordained bishop of Kyaneon in 2020.

== See also ==
- Catholic Church in Turkey

== Bibliography ==
- Kolb, Frank (2008). Burg – Polis – Bischofssitz. Geschichte der Siedlungskammer von Kyaneai in der Südwesttürkei [Castle – City – Bishopric. History of the settlement area of Kyaneai in south-western Turkey]. Mainz: Zabern, ISBN 978-3-8053-3900-1.
- Kolb, Frank (ed.) (2010). Die Siedlung von Kyaneai in Zentrallykien I: Öffentliche Bauten und Wohnareale [The Settlement of Kyaneai in Central Lycia I: Public Buildings and Residential Areas]. Lykische Studien, vol. 9.1. Bonn: Habelt, ISBN 978-3-7749-3613-3.
- Hülden, Oliver (2010). Die Siedlung von Kyaneai in Zentrallykien II: Die Nekropolen von Kyaneai. Studien zur antiken Grabkultur in Lykien [The Settlement of Kyaneai in Central Lycia II: The Necropolises of Kyaneai. Studies on Ancient Funerary Culture in Lycia]. Lykische Studien, vol. 9,2. Bonn: Habelt, ISBN 978-3-7749-3677-5.
