= Hilsenheim =

Hilsenheim Hílse
- Commune
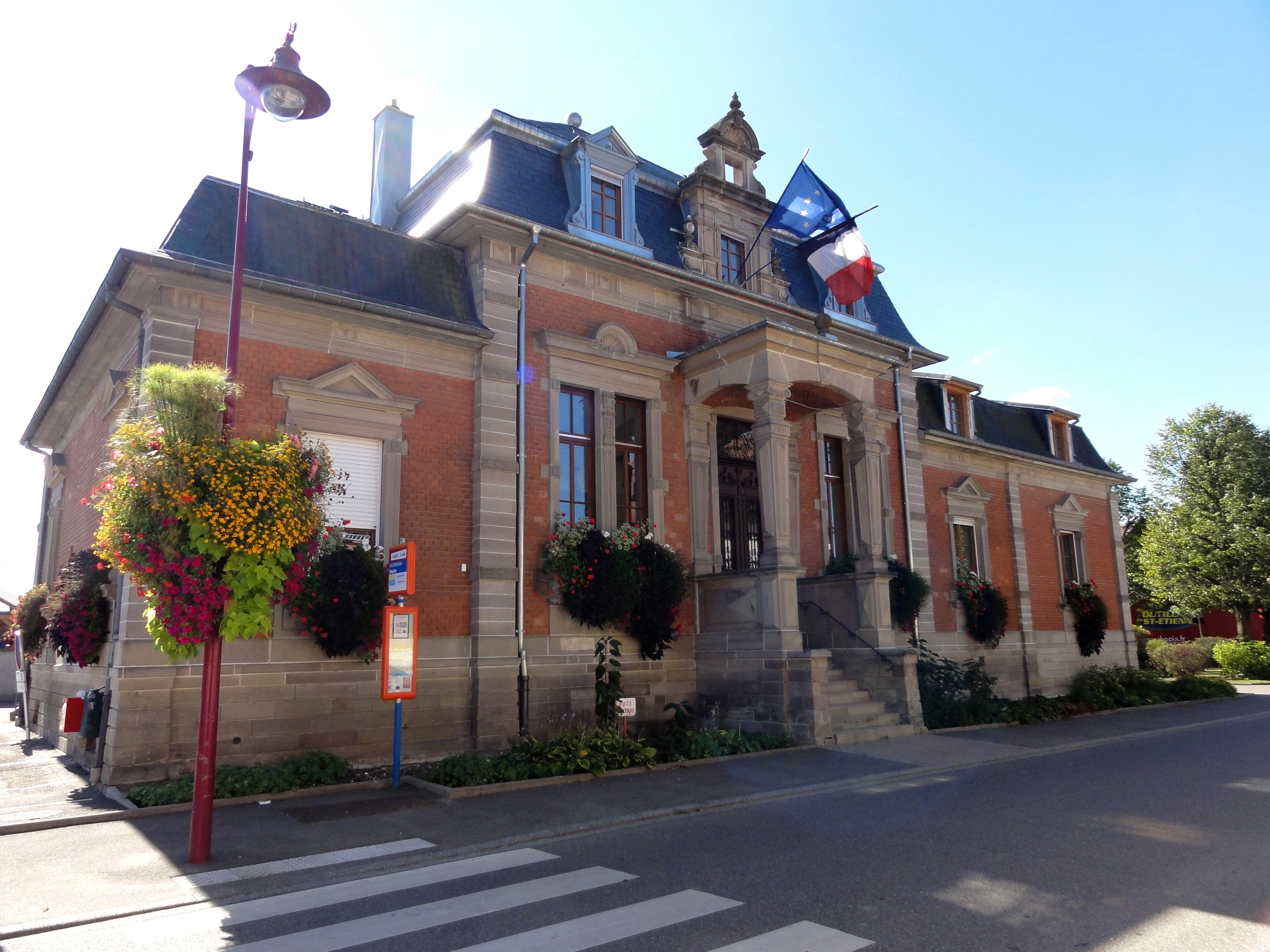
- The town hall in Hilsenheim

- Coat of arms
- Location of Hilsenheim
- Location within France Location within Grand Est
- Coordinates: 48°17′21″N 7°33′58″E
- Country: France
- Region: Grand Est
- Department: Bas-Rhin
- Arrondissement: Sélestat-Erstein
- Canton: Sélestat

Government
  - Mayor (2020–2026): Mireille Mosser
- Area^{1}: 19.91 km^{2} (7.69 sq mi)
- Highest elevation: 168 m (551 ft)
- Lowest elevation: 160 m (520 ft)
- Population (2023): 2,604
  - Density: 130.8/km^{2} (338.7/sq mi)
- Time zone: UTC+01:00 (CET)
  - Summer (DST): UTC+02:00 (CEST)
- INSEE/Postal code: 67196 /67600
- ^{1} French Land Register data, which excludes lakes, ponds, glaciers > 1 km^{2} (0.386 sq mi or 247 acres) and river estuaries.

Hilsenheim (French pronunciation: [ilzənaim]; Alsatian: Helsa) is a commune in the Bas-Rhin department in Alsace in north-eastern France.

== Geography ==
=== Neighbouring communes ===
Surrounding communes are Witternheim, Bindernheim und Wittisheim to the east, Muttersholtz in the south, Ebersmunster to the west and Kogenheim, Sermersheim and Rossfeld to the north. Further afield, Sélestat is some 10 kilometres (6 mi) to the southwest, and the Strasbourg conurbation is 40 kilometres (25 mi) to the north. About 10 kilometres to the east is the river Rhine, which here is tracked by the German frontier.

=== The land ===
The land, characteristic of the Ried district of which this is a part, is composed of rich alluvial deposits. Before the Rhine was channeled much of the land was marshy and prone to flooding: even today there are many areas where the water table is only two meters below the surface of the land.

Currently the non-built land in the commune is divided between forests (27%) and arable farming (52%). The predominant arable crop is currently maize Brit (corn US English). Vineyards and orchards taking up most of the balance. In addition to agriculture the local economy features some small scale manufacturing and logistical activity.

=== Communication links ===
The village is the crossing point of numerous small local roads. The Autoroute A35 is some twelve kilometres to the west and the German Autobahn A5 is some twenty kilometres to the east. The French autoroute is here toll free, but both the highways suffer from congestion and the risk of serious delays at peak times, so drivers setting out on a long drive to the north or south do well to listen to the traffic reports before choosing on which side of the Rhine to travel.

Between 1909 and 1944 a steam railway (le Riedbahnnel) connecting Sélestat to Sundhouse passed close to the village, but Hilsenheim never had its own station, and after the War, with the surge in car ownership that followed, the railway was abandoned and then progressively dismantled.

A currently unused NATO pipeline also passes close to the village, beneath the road to Wittisheim.

=== Tension ===
The little town has a strong sense of its history, with many traditional Alsatian houses from the seventeenth, eighteenth and nineteenth centuries ever more scrupulously maintained and restored. There is, as in many villages of this kind within commuting distance of Strasbourg, a perceived tension between preserving Hilsenheim as a balanced and integrated community and the risk of progressively transforming it into a dormitory town increasingly dominated by the requirements and developments in the larger urban economies such as Sélestat (Schlettstadt in Alsatian and German) and, above all, Strasbourg.

== History ==
=== Prehistory ===
Several Iron Age tumuli testify to settlement here in prehistoric times: some in the Willermatt quarter were archeologically investigated early in the twentieth century. It is thought that the proximity of the Celtic site at Novientum (modern Ebersmunster) indicates that the Hilsenheim area will have been strongly influenced by tribes mentioned by Caesar and Tacitus such as the Mediomatrici and the Triboci: during the early centuries of the first millennium the overwhelming political power and cultural influence came from the Romans themselves.

=== Roman period ===
Hilsenheim is on the old paved Roman road that connected Basel and Strasbourg. Today this follows the line of a rural road (RD212) called Heidenstraessel. Some three kilometres to the north of the village, at the edge of the road the water table breaks the surface of the land. This point is known locally as "Waechterquellen" which indicates a clear water source, and seems to have originated with a Roman guard post of some sort. According to local legend King Dagobert III of Neustria and of Austrasia drowned in this spring when his carriage ran into it.

Directly to the south of the spring is an isolated fortified farm called The Riedhof, which may have been built on the foundations of a Roman fort, possibly an outlying fortification of the Fourth Legion garrison which guarded the important religious centre at Hellelum (modern Ehl, Bas-Rhin).

=== Franco-German competition ===
As the French state expanded towards its 'natural' eastern frontier, the Rhine, Alsace found itself a French territory by the eighteenth century. Between 1871 and 1918, however, Hilsenheim, in common with the whole of Alsace was annexed by Germany. Several of the town's public buildings including the mairie and some schools date from the period, and provide good examples of the heavy Wilhelmine architecture of imperial Germany.

Ahead of the Second World War citizens living closer to the German frontier were evacuated to central and western France, but the people of Hilsenheim, 8 kilometres (5 mi) from the frontier, suffered German occupation. Several villagers were forcibly conscripted into the German Army and died on the Russian front.

On the night of 15 March 1944 a Canadian Lancaster bomber was shot down by German anti-aircraft guns, crashing near to the road towards Wittisheim. The seven crew members, members of the 408th squadron, are buried in Hilsenheim cemetery.

Two Maginot Line bunkers survive at the edge of the commune, both in ruins: one is on the Rue des Vergers (Orchard Road) on the edge of the village on the road towards Wittisheim, and the second is about 1.5 kilometres (1 mi) east of the village on the road towards Bindernheim, level with a patch of woodland.

In the winter of 1944/45 the village found itself on the edge of the Colmar Pocket, and during the heavy fighting that took place over the enclave, several buildings in Hilsenheim were destroyed including the church. This would be rebuilt during the 1950s to a contemporary design. After two months of intensive fighting, during which the population, still not evacuated, hid in their cellars, the village was finally liberated in January 1945 by the Moroccan Goumiers of the 15th Tabor (2nd GTM), part of the First French Army under General de Lattre. The liberating forces continued east to the Rhine while other First Army units took over their position in the village. During the fighting several villagers were killed, and more were killed subsequently because of mines set on some of the surrounding roads and fields.

=== The name ===
The name Hilsenheim can be analysed as a combination of two words, being "Hils", a Celtic word which refers to the hilt of a sword or to fighting, and "heim", a widely used old word for a home or a place: this explanation is consistent with the modern coat of arms used by the village. An alternative etymology suggests the word means "habitat above the water", and certainly any settlement in this area would, two thousand years ago, have rested on a raised piece of ground surrounded by marsh land: this interpretation is based on an Indo-European linguistic root indicating the vertical movement of water.

The coat of arms incorporates the golden handle of a sword.

== Population ==
Historical population
| Year | Pop. | ±% p.a. |
|---|---|---|
| 1968 | 1,666 | — |
| 1975 | 1,933 | +2.15% |
| 1982 | 1,890 | −0.32% |
| 1990 | 1,788 | −0.69% |
| 1999 | 1,980 | +1.14% |
| 2007 | 2,439 | +2.64% |
| 2012 | 2,551 | +0.90% |
| 2017 | 2,633 | +0.63% |
| 2023 | 2,604 | −0.18% |
Source: INSEE

== See also ==
- Communes of the Bas-Rhin department
