= Demre =

- District and municipality
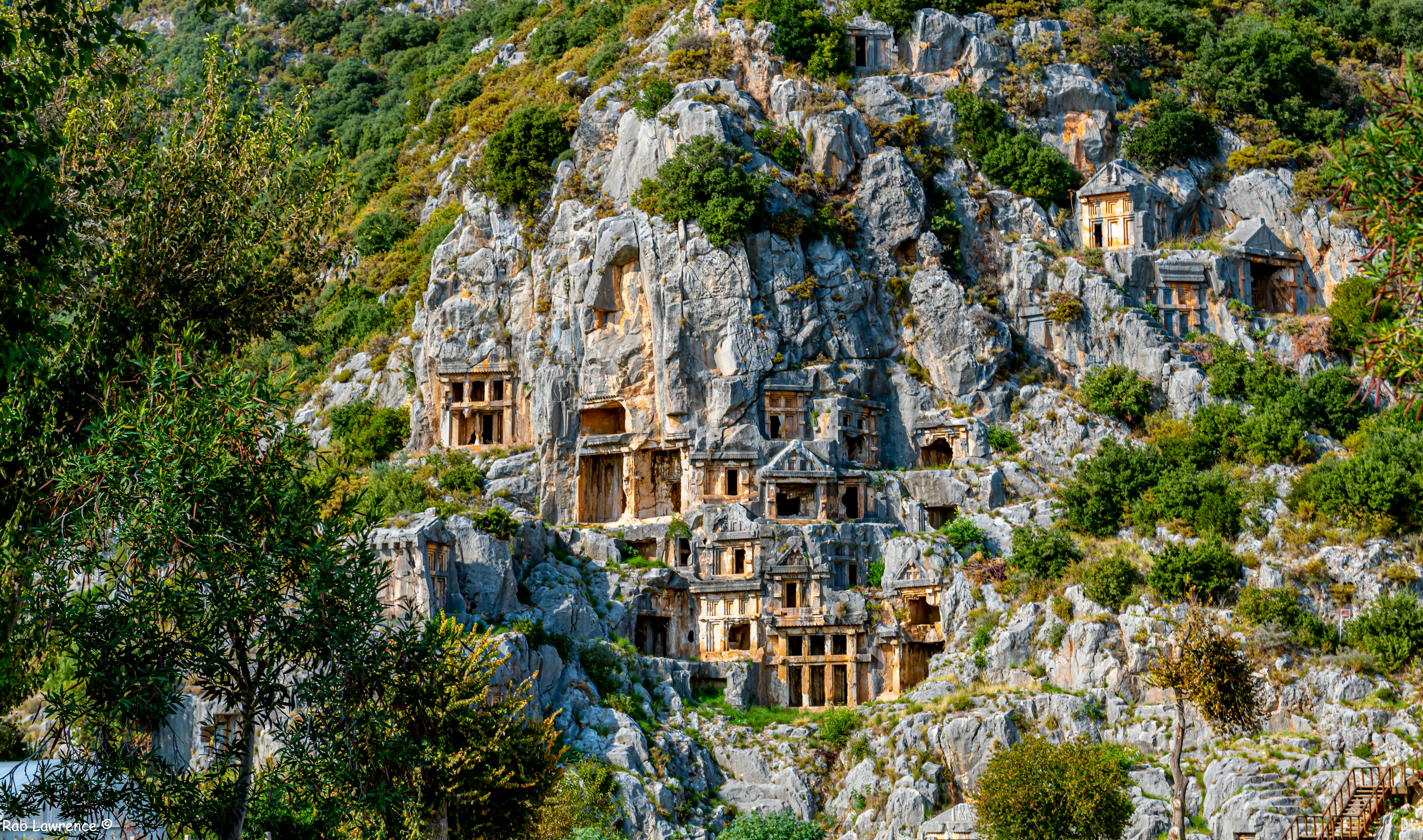
- Myra Rock Tombs, Demre

- Logo

- Map showing Demre District in Antalya Province

- Location within Turkey
- Coordinates: 36°14′50″N 29°58′58″E
- Country: Turkey
- Province: Antalya

Government
  - Mayor: Fahri Duran (CHP)
- Area: 329 km^{2} (127 sq mi)
- Elevation: 10 m (33 ft)
- Population (2022): 27,691
  - Density: 84.2/km^{2} (218/sq mi)
- Time zone: UTC+3 (TRT)
- Postal code: 07570
- Area code: 0242
- Website: www.demre.bel.tr

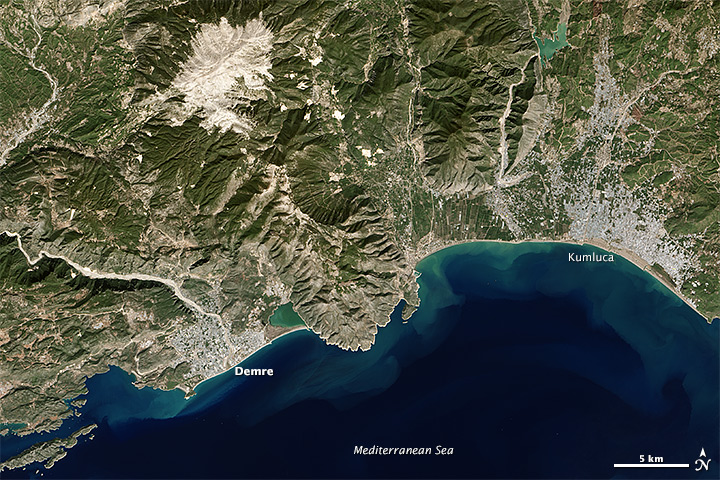
Demre, Kumluca and the Turkish Riviera from space

Demre is a municipality and district of Antalya Province, Turkey. Its area is 329 square kilometres (127 sq mi), and its population is 27,691 (2022). It was named after the river Demre.

Demre is the Lycian town of Myra, the home of Saint Nicholas of Myra. The district was known as Kale until it was renamed in 2005. A substantial Christian community of Greeks lived in Demre until the 1920s when they migrated to Greece as part of the 1923 population exchange between Greece and Turkey. A small population of Turkish farmers moved into the region when the Greeks migrated. The region is popular with tourists today, particularly Christian pilgrims who visit the tomb of Saint Nicholas.

== Geography ==
Demre is on the coast of the Teke peninsula, west of the bay of Antalya, with the Taurus Mountains behind. The mountains are forested and the coastal strip is made of good soil brought down by the mountain rivers. The climate is the typical Mediterranean pattern of hot dry summers and warm wet winters.

Before the tourism boom began in the 1980s, the local economy depended on agriculture, which is still important today. The villages of Demre grow pomegranates and citrus fruits and now a large quantity of fruits and vegetables all year round in greenhouses. Also with its rich history, attractions like the island of Kekova, the sea and warm weather, this coast is very popular with holidaymakers from Turkey and all over Europe, although Demre still does not have the high volume of tourists enjoyed by districts nearer Antalya Airport. Some local handicrafts like rug making, and events such as the annual camel wrestling festival bring in extra income.

The local cuisine includes fish and other seafood from the Mediterranean.

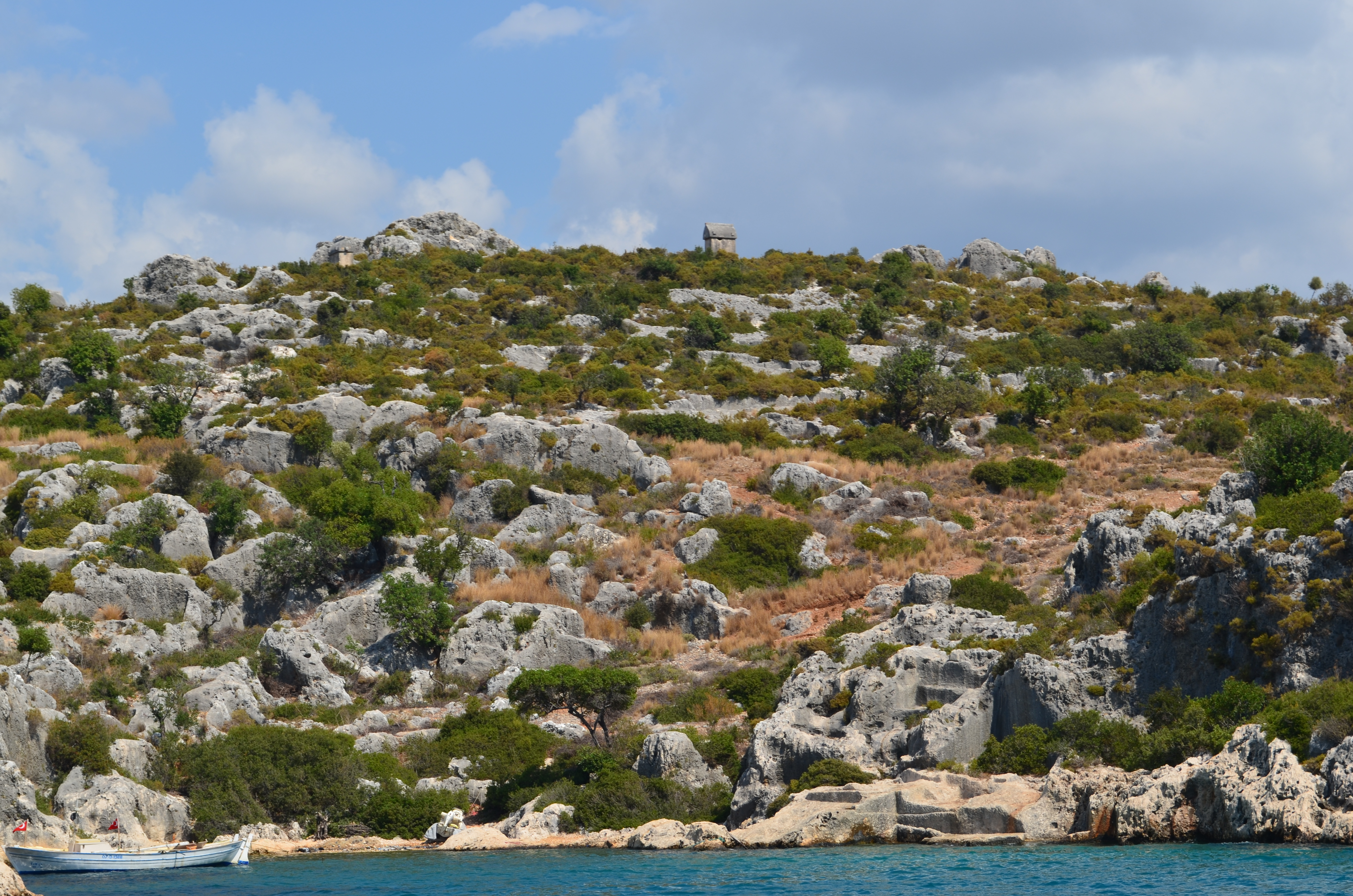
Rocky coast in Demre

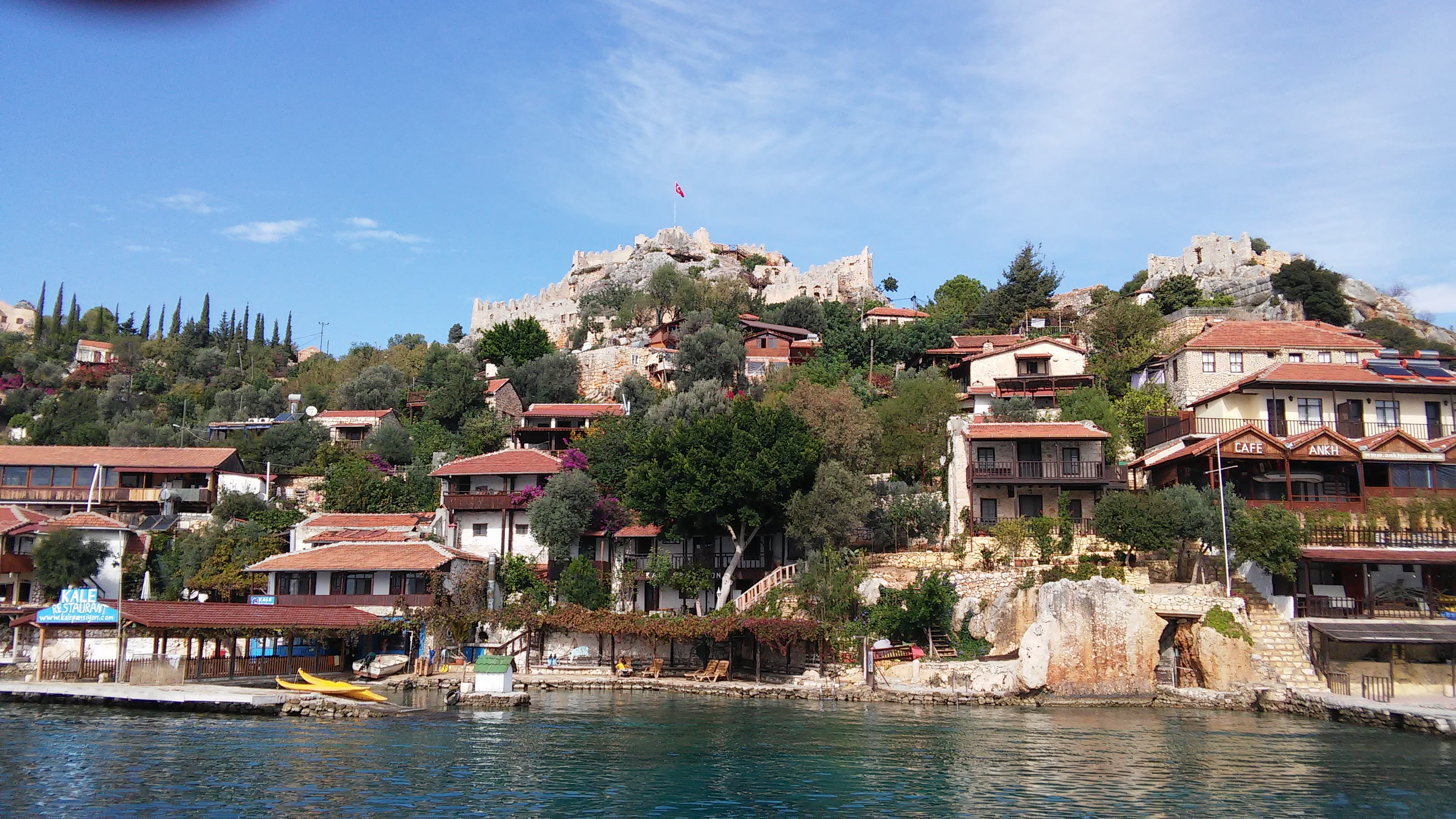
A view of coastal homes and the castle

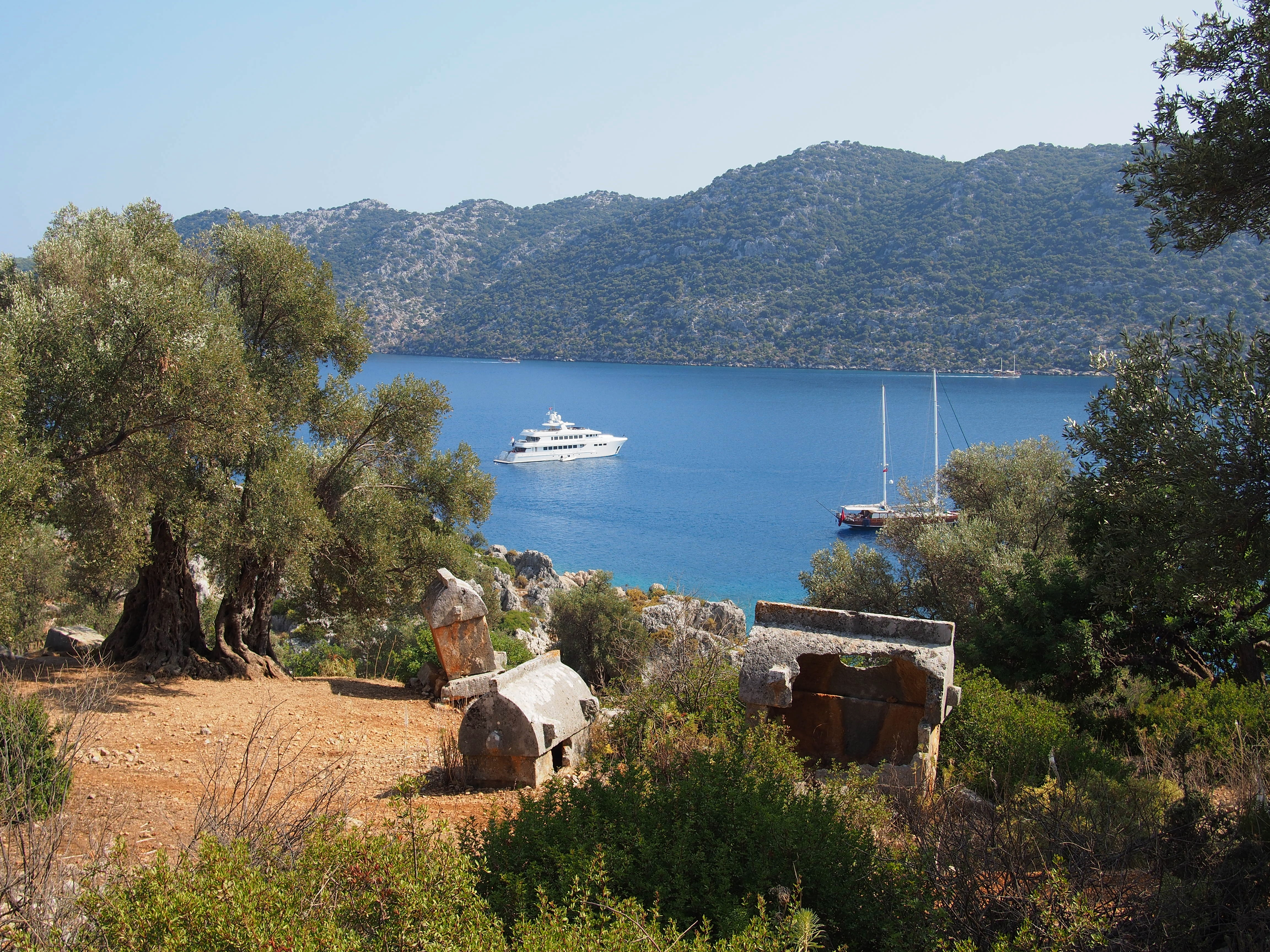
Ancient Lycian Tombs overlooking the coast

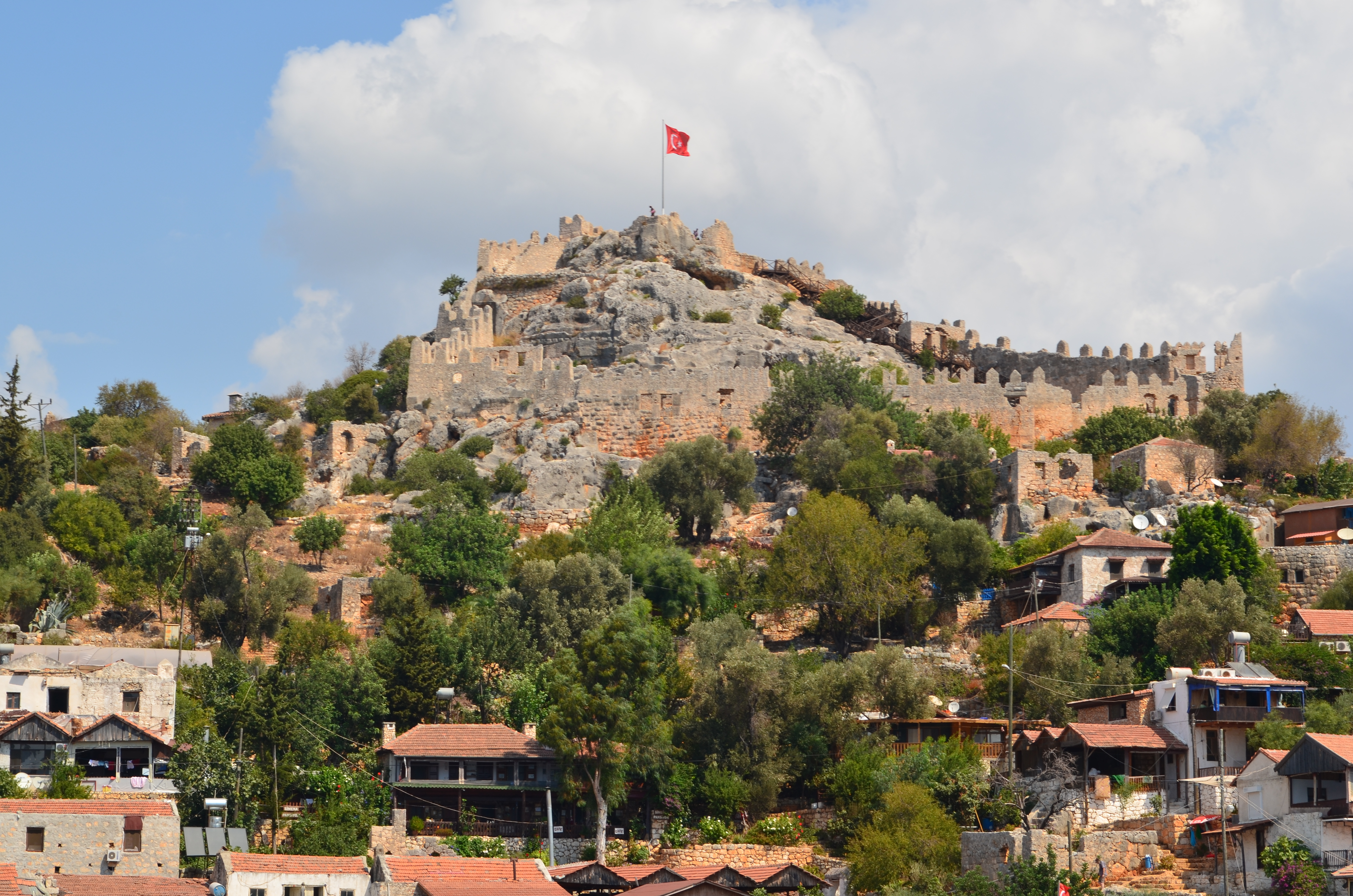
Demre Castle

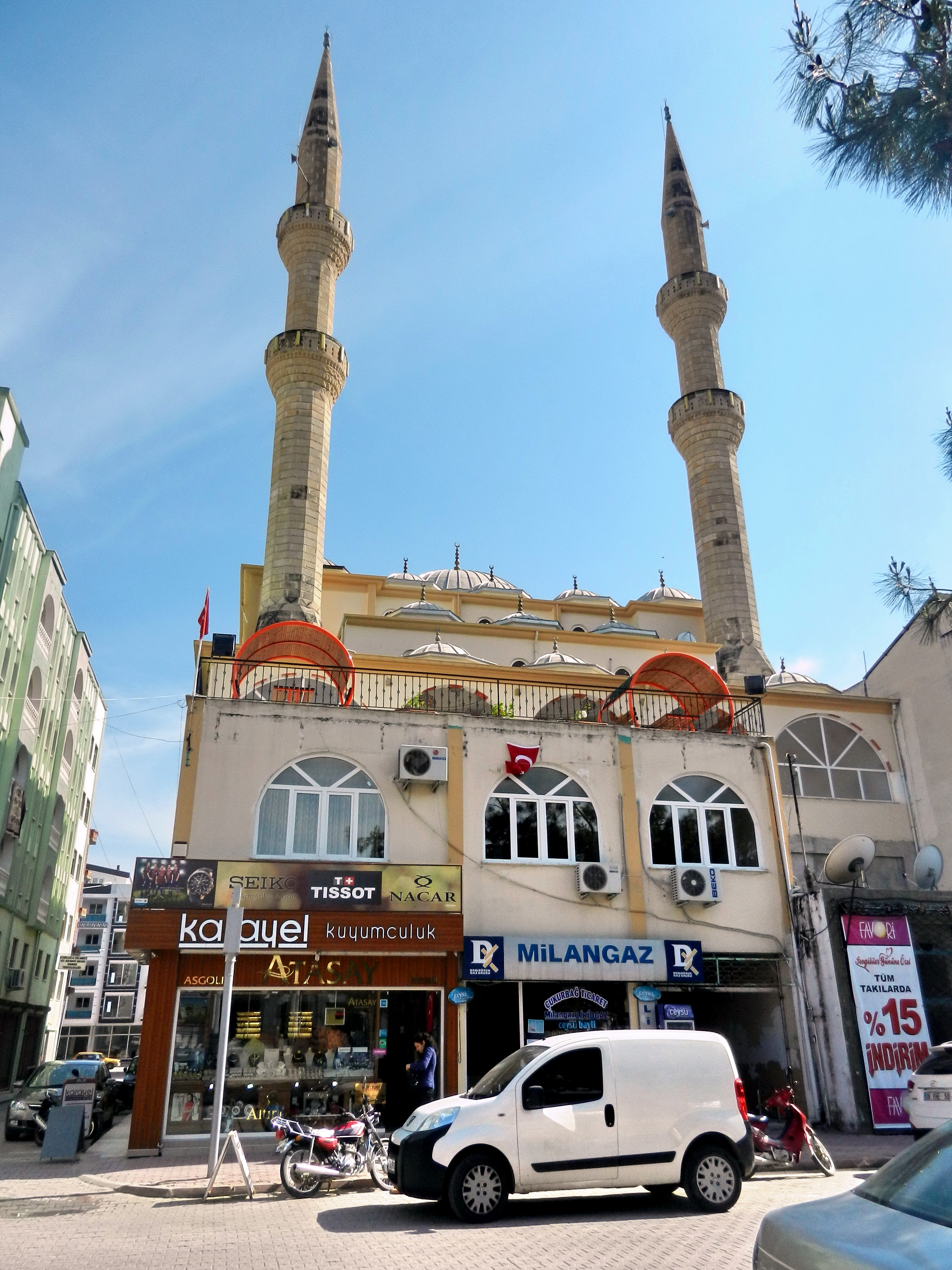
A local mosque

== Climate ==
Demre has a hot-summer Mediterranean climate (Köppen: Csa), with very hot, dry summers and mild, rainy winters.

Climate data for Demre (1991–2020)
Month	Jan	Feb	Mar	Apr	May	Jun	Jul	Aug	Sep	Oct	Nov	Dec	Year
Mean daily maximum °C (°F)	16.4 (61.5)	16.7 (62.1)	18.7 (65.7)	21.9 (71.4)	26.2 (79.2)	30.9 (87.6)	34.1 (93.4)	34.4 (93.9)	31.4 (88.5)	26.9 (80.4)	22.0 (71.6)	17.8 (64.0)	24.8 (76.6)
Daily mean °C (°F)	10.6 (51.1)	11.2 (52.2)	13.2 (55.8)	16.3 (61.3)	20.7 (69.3)	25.3 (77.5)	28.7 (83.7)	29.0 (84.2)	25.5 (77.9)	20.5 (68.9)	15.4 (59.7)	11.9 (53.4)	19.1 (66.4)
Mean daily minimum °C (°F)	5.7 (42.3)	5.9 (42.6)	7.3 (45.1)	10.3 (50.5)	14.6 (58.3)	18.6 (65.5)	22.4 (72.3)	23.1 (73.6)	19.3 (66.7)	14.6 (58.3)	10.0 (50.0)	7.0 (44.6)	13.3 (55.9)
Average precipitation mm (inches)	167.38 (6.59)	115.19 (4.54)	66.25 (2.61)	34.54 (1.36)	15.83 (0.62)	3.86 (0.15)	1.0 (0.04)	4.72 (0.19)	13.6 (0.54)	71.06 (2.80)	115.96 (4.57)	201.45 (7.93)	810.84 (31.92)
Average precipitation days (≥ 1.0 mm)	10.8	8.6	6.3	4.3	2.2	1.2	1.0	1.0	1.5	4.3	6.2	10.3	57.7
Source: NOAA

== Composition ==
There are 17 neighbourhoods in Demre District:

- Alakent
- Belören
- Beymelek
- Büyükkum
- Çağman
- Çevreli
- Davazlar
- Gökyazı
- Gürses
- Kaleüçağız
- Kapaklı
- Karabucak
- Kayaaltı
- Köşkerler
- Küçükkum
- Yavu
- Yaylakaya

== Demographics ==
The district has a population of 27,691 (2022). The town itself has 18,268 inhabitants.

== History ==
=== Lycian period ===
The settlement now known as Demre was founded as Myra, one of the most important city-states of ancient Lycia. The earliest physical evidence of habitation dates to the 5th century BCE, when monumental rock-cut tombs were carved into the cliff faces above the river plain. However, Lycian civilisation in the broader region dates back to at least the 8th century BCE, and the settlement may be considerably older.

Lycia occupied a mountainous strip of southwestern Anatolia, roughly between modern Fethiye and Antalya. Unlike the empires that surrounded it, Lycia governed itself through a federation — the Lycian League — now recognised as one of history's earliest experiments in representative democracy. Each member city received one, two, or three votes in the federal assembly based on its size and importance. Myra held three votes — the maximum — placing it alongside Xanthos, Patara, Pinara, Olympos, and Tlos as one of the League's six most powerful cities. The League's system of proportional representation later attracted the attention of Montesquieu, who discussed it in The Spirit of the Laws (1748), and of Alexander Hamilton and James Madison, who referenced it during the Constitutional Convention of 1787 as a model for balancing federal and state power.

Myra's wealth derived from fertile agricultural land on the river plain and maritime trade through its harbour at Andriake, five kilometres to the southwest. Andriake connected Myra to the broader Mediterranean trading network — grain from Egypt, olive oil from Greece, timber from the Taurus Mountains. The rock-cut tombs that dominate the cliff face above the modern town are monuments to this prosperity: over a hundred carved chambers survive in two groups, the River Necropolis and the Sea Necropolis, their facades imitating Lycian wooden architecture and Greek temple fronts. Some preserve traces of the original painted decoration in red, blue, and yellow.

=== Roman period ===
Rome absorbed Lycia as a province in 43 CE, and Myra entered its most prosperous period. The city's theatre — a semicircle carved into the hillside with a capacity of over 10,000 — was expanded and adorned with elaborate stone masks and friezes. Myra became strategically vital to the empire through the Egyptian grain trade: the sea route from Alexandria to Italy passed directly through the Lycian coast, and Andriake harbour became a mandatory stopping point for grain ships.

In 129–130 CE, Emperor Hadrian visited the region and commissioned a colossal granarium at Andriake — a seven-room warehouse measuring 2,307 square metres, large enough to store grain for the entire eastern Mediterranean fleet. An inscription above the entrance, still readable today, records Hadrian's patronage. The granary has been restored and since 2016 houses the Lycian Civilizations Museum.

Around 59 CE, the apostle Paul, while being transported to Rome for trial, changed ships at Andriake harbour. The Acts of the Apostles records the event: "And there the centurion found a ship of Alexandria sailing into Italy; and he put us therein" (Acts 27:5–6).

=== Saint Nicholas ===
Nicholas was born around 270 CE in Patara, a coastal city sixty kilometres west of Myra, to a wealthy Christian family. After his parents died in an epidemic, he gave away his inheritance to the poor. He became Bishop of Myra in his thirties and served for approximately three decades, surviving imprisonment under Emperor Diocletian's persecution and attending the First Council of Nicaea in 325.

The legends that grew around Nicholas — secret gifts of gold coins to save three sisters from poverty, miraculous provision of grain during a famine, the calming of a deadly storm at sea — became the foundation for the figure the world would come to know as Santa Claus. He died in 343 and was buried in a church built over his grave in Myra's town centre. That church, rebuilt and expanded over the following centuries, still stands today as the Church of St. Nicholas and is the most visited site in Demre.

=== Earthquakes, Arab raids, and decline ===
The centuries following Nicholas's death brought repeated crises. A series of powerful earthquakes struck the Lycian coast — the exact dates are debated, with scholarly estimates ranging from the 2nd to the 4th century CE. The most dramatic consequence occurred at Kekova, thirty-five kilometres from Myra, where the southern shoreline of the ancient settlement of Dolichiste sank into the Mediterranean, submerging houses, stairways, harbour walls, and water cisterns. These ruins, visible beneath the clear water to this day, make Kekova one of the most remarkable underwater archaeological sites in the Mediterranean.

From the 7th century, Arab naval raids devastated the coast. The Church of St. Nicholas was damaged in raids in 808 and again in 1034. Emperor Constantine IX Monomachos ordered its restoration in 1043, adding defensive walls. Andriake harbour, once bustling with Egyptian grain ships, began silting up as alluvial deposits from the Demre River (ancient Myros) choked the bay.

In 1087, a group of merchants from the Italian city of Bari broke into St. Nicholas's sarcophagus and removed the majority of his bones. The relics were transported to Bari, where they remain in the Basilica di San Nicola. A smaller portion was later taken to Venice. The question of whether the relics should be returned has been raised repeatedly by Turkish authorities, most recently in 2009, but Italy has not agreed.

=== Ottoman period and European rediscovery ===
The Seljuk Turks took control of the Lycian coast in the late 12th century, and Ottoman rule followed in the 15th. For Myra — increasingly known by its Turkish name Kale ("castle") — these transitions marked slow, quiet decline. The grand public buildings fell into disrepair. The theatre filled with rubble and vegetation. The rock-cut tombs became goat shelters.

The most insidious force of destruction was geological. The Demre River carried silt from the Taurus Mountains year after year, depositing layer upon layer of alluvial sediment across the river plain. By the 19th century, metres of earth covered Myra's streets, its agora, and the lower tiers of its theatre. The harbour at Andriake had become a shallow marsh. The Church of St. Nicholas sat below the rising ground level, water seeping into its foundations.

European travellers began to pull Demre's past back into view. Captain Francis Beaufort mapped the coast in 1811–12 and identified the ruins at Myra. Sir Charles Fellows explored the site in 1838, publishing detailed drawings that astonished London. Thomas Spratt and Edward Forbes conducted systematic surveys in the 1840s. Their work initiated a slow process of excavation and recognition that continues to this day.

=== Modern era ===
The 1923 population exchange between Greece and Turkey — part of the Treaty of Lausanne — removed the town's remaining Greek Orthodox community, the direct spiritual descendants of the congregation Nicholas had served sixteen centuries earlier. The Church of St. Nicholas lost its last worshippers.

The event that shaped modern Demre most decisively occurred in the 1960s, when local farmers learned about plastic greenhouse technology being used in the Netherlands and began to experiment. The Demre valley offered near-ideal conditions: a flat plain at sea level, more than 300 days of sunshine per year, mild winters buffered by the Taurus Mountains, and ample water from the river. Within two decades, the open fields were covered with plastic-roofed greenhouses. Tomatoes, peppers, aubergines, and cucumbers could be grown year-round. The region's economy shifted from subsistence agriculture to industrial-scale vegetable production. Today, Demre is one of Turkey's major greenhouse vegetable centres.

The town was officially renamed from Kale to Demre in 2005. Its population is approximately 25,000.

Archaeological work continues at every major site. At Myra, Hacettepe University has conducted excavations for decades, gradually uncovering the theatre's lower tiers from beneath centuries of alluvial deposit. In February 2021, researchers from Akdeniz University led by Nevzat Çevik announced the discovery of dozens of 2,200-year-old terracotta figurines with inscriptions at Myra, some depicting Greek deities and preserving traces of original paint. Archaeologists also recovered material remains of the Hellenistic theatre made of ceramic, bronze, lead, and silver.

In December 2024, archaeologists excavating beneath the Church of St. Nicholas discovered a previously unknown limestone sarcophagus, found 1.5–2 metres beneath the mosaic floor of a two-storey annexe. The discovery, made during the "Legacy for the Future" project led by Assoc. Prof. Ebru Fatma Fındık, included lamp fragments and animal bones suggesting a ritual burial context. Radiocarbon dating is underway to determine whether the sarcophagus may be connected to the saint's original burial.

In 2016, the Lycian Civilizations Museum opened inside the restored Hadrian's Granary at Andriake, housing 1,476 artefacts from across the Lycian region. In 2025, the village of Üçağız (ancient Teimiussa), which serves as the departure point for Kekova boat tours, was selected as a UNWTO Best Tourism Village.

== Places of interest ==
=== Myra Ancient City ===
The archaeological site of Myra lies approximately 2 km (1.2 mi) north of Demre town centre and comprises two principal monument groups:

- Lycian rock-cut tombs: Over one hundred tombs carved into the cliff face in two groups — the River Necropolis and the Sea Necropolis. The tombs date primarily to the 5th–4th centuries BCE and include temple-facade and house-type tombs with carved reliefs depicting funeral scenes. Some retain traces of original paint. The so-called Lion Tomb (or Painted Tomb) in the Sea Necropolis features eleven life-sized figures and is considered one of the finest examples of Lycian funerary art.
- Roman theatre: A well-preserved theatre with 35 rows of seats and a capacity of over 10,000. The scaenae frons (stage building facade) is decorated with carved theatrical masks and mythological friezes. The theatre was damaged by an earthquake in 141 CE and restored with funds donated by Opramoas of Rhodiapolis, one of the wealthiest philanthropists of the ancient world.

Myra is a ticketed site. The Turkish Museum Pass is accepted.

=== Church of St. Nicholas ===
The Church of St. Nicholas (Turkish: Aziz Nikolaos Kilisesi) is a 6th-century Byzantine basilica in Demre town centre, built over the burial place of Saint Nicholas, the 4th-century Bishop of Myra who inspired the legend of Santa Claus. The basilica features a Greek cross plan, 11th-century frescoes depicting scenes from the saint's life and miracles, opus sectile marble inlay floors, and a synthronon (semicircular clergy bench) in the apse.

The sarcophagus associated with St. Nicholas is displayed within the church but was damaged in 1087 when merchants from Bari removed the saint's relics. The church was restored in 1862 under the patronage of Tsar Alexander II of Russia, during which vaults and a tower were added to the original Byzantine structure.

The church has been on the Tentative List of UNESCO World Heritage Sites since 2000. Archaeological excavations have continued since 1988, initially led by Hacettepe University and subsequently by the Turkish Ministry of Culture's "Legacy for the Future" project. A new limestone sarcophagus was discovered beneath the church floor in December 2024; carbon dating results are pending.

The church is a ticketed site. The Turkish Museum Pass is accepted. Divine Liturgy, according with the rites of Eastern Orthodox Christianity, is held annually on 6 December, Saint Nicholas Day.

=== Andriake ===
Andriake, located 5 km (3.1 mi) southwest of Demre at the mouth of the Demre River, was the harbour city of ancient Myra. The site includes:

- Hadrian's Granary and the Lycian Civilizations Museum: A monumental seven-room granarium (2,307 m²) built by Emperor Hadrian in 129–130 CE for the storage of grain on the Egypt-to-Rome trade route. Restored between 2009 and 2016, it now houses the Lycian Civilizations Museum with 1,476 artefacts displayed across eight exhibition halls, covering Lycian history, epigraphy, coinage, economy, religion, and funerary culture. The museum also contains a reconstructed ancient trading ship.
- Ancient harbour and ruins: The harbour area includes the remains of a 5th-century synagogue (discovered in 2010), Roman baths, an agora, six Byzantine churches, and a large restored cistern. A mound of Murex shells near the granary provides evidence of ancient Tyrian purple dye production.
- Çayağzı Beach and wetlands: Adjacent to the ancient harbour, Çayağzı offers a sandy beach that serves as a nesting ground for loggerhead sea turtles (Caretta caretta) between May and September. The surrounding wetlands host 149 recorded bird species. Çayağzı is also the departure point for Kekova boat tours.

The museum is a ticketed site; the outdoor ruins are freely accessible. The Turkish Museum Pass is accepted for the museum.

=== Kekova and Simena ===
The Kekova region, approximately 35 km (22 mi) from Demre centre, encompasses three ancient settlements around a sheltered bay:

- Kekova Sunken City: The southern coast of Kekova Island (ancient Dolichiste) subsided into the sea following earthquakes in the 2nd century CE. Submerged ruins — walls, stairways, harbour foundations, water cisterns — are visible beneath the clear water. The area was designated a Specially Protected Area (Turkish: Özel Çevre Koruma Bölgesi) in 1990, one of Turkey's first. Swimming and diving are prohibited in the protected zone. The ruins are accessible by boat tour from Üçağız.
- Simena Castle and Kaleköy: The hilltop village of Kaleköy (ancient Simena) is a car-free settlement accessible only by boat or on foot. It is crowned by a medieval Byzantine castle offering panoramic views of the bay. A small Lycian rock-cut theatre (the smallest known in Lycia) and Lycian sarcophagi are integrated into the village fabric. The castle is a ticketed site.
- Üçağız: The fishing village of Üçağız (ancient Teimiussa) at the bay's western edge is the main departure point for Kekova boat tours. Rock-cut Lycian tombs and sarcophagi are found within the village. Üçağız was selected as a UNWTO Best Tourism Village in 2025. A 30-minute footpath connects Üçağız to Kaleköy.

== See also ==
- Saint Nicholas § Myra
