= Yavu, Demre =

Yavu
- Neighbourhood
- Country: Turkey
- Province: Antalya
- District: Demre
- Population (2022): 402
- Time zone: UTC+3 (TRT)

Yavu is a neighbourhood in the municipality and district of Demre, Antalya Province, Turkey. Its population is 402 (2022).
