= Beymelek, Demre =

Beymelek
- Neighbourhood
- Location in Turkey
- Coordinates: 36°15′N 30°01′E
- Country: Turkey
- Province: Antalya
- District: Demre
- Population (2022): 3,708
- Time zone: UTC+3 (TRT)

Beymelek is a neighbourhood in the municipality and district of Demre, Antalya Province, Turkey. Its population is 3,708 (2022). Before the 2013 reorganisation, it was a town (belde).
