= Bièvre, Belgium =

Municipality in Wallonia, Belgium

Bièvre Bive (Walloon)
- Municipality
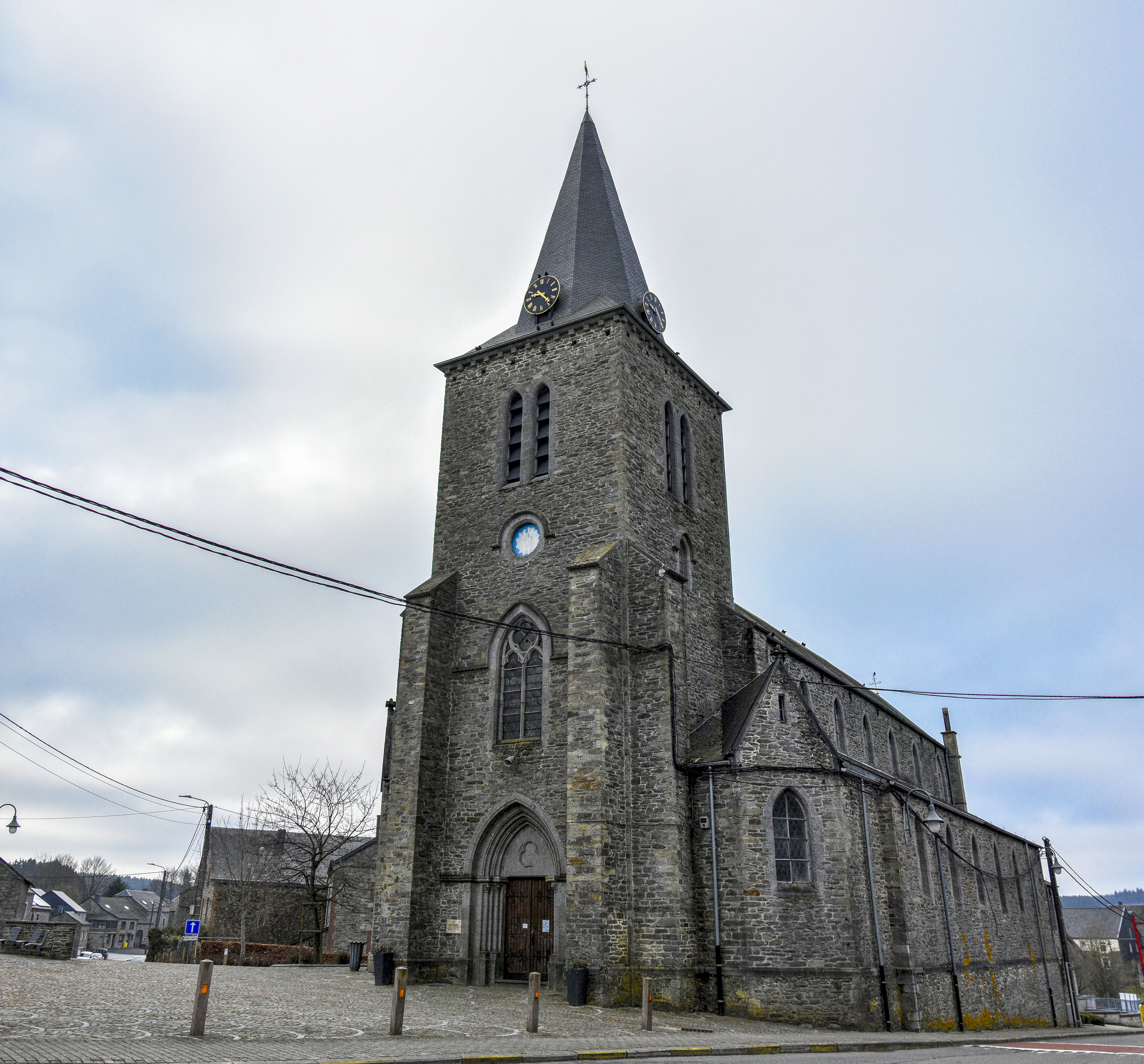

- Flag Coat of arms

- Location of Bièvre in Namur province
- Interactive map of Bièvre
- Location in Belgium
- Coordinates: 49°56′N 05°01′E
- Country: Belgium
- Community: French Community
- Region: Wallonia
- Province: Namur
- Arrondissement: Dinant

Government
  - Mayor: David Clarinval
  - Governing party: Ensemble Pour Vous

Area
  - Total: 109.55 km^{2} (42.30 sq mi)

Population (2018-01-01)
  - Total: 3,307
  - Density: 30.19/km^{2} (78.18/sq mi)
- Postal codes: 5555
- NIS code: 91015
- Area codes: 061
- Website: www.bievre.be

Bièvre (French pronunciation: [bjɛvʁ]; Walloon: Bive) is a municipality of Wallonia located in the province of Namur, Belgium.

On 1 January 2006 the municipality had 3,151 inhabitants. The total area is 109.59 km^{2}, giving a population density of 29 inhabitants per km^{2}.

The municipality consists of the following districts: Bièvre, Baillamont, Bellefontaine, Cornimont, Graide, Gros-Fays, Monceau-en-Ardenne, Naomé, Oizy, and Petit-Fays.

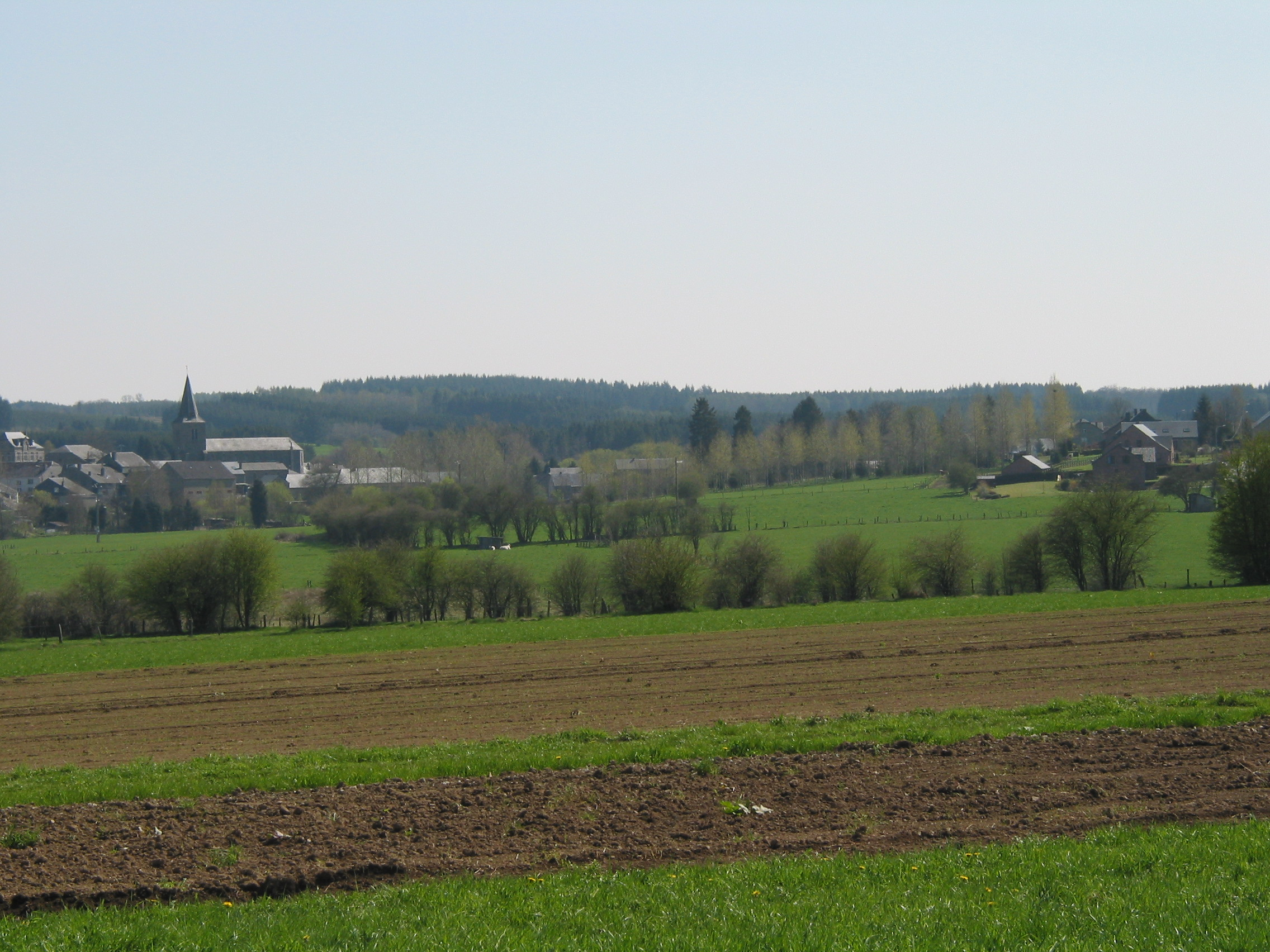
View on Bièvre

== See also ==
- List of protected heritage sites in Bièvre
