= Tomb of Saint Nicholas =

Irish historical site

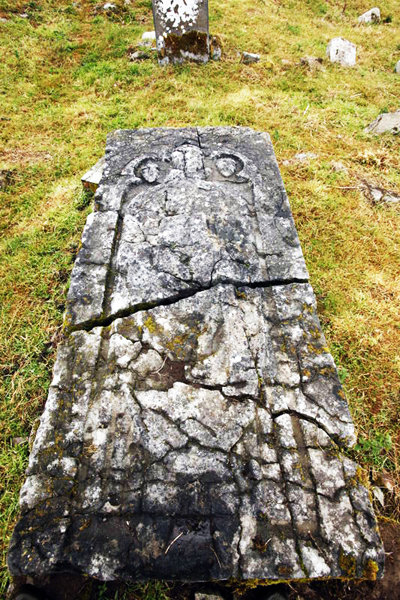
- Tombstone of a medieval cleric, popularly believed to depict Saint Nicholas

- Location within Ireland
- 52.5100°N 7.1688°W
- Type: effigy
- Location: County Kilkenny, Republic of Ireland
- Part of: Newtown Jerpoint

History
- Built: early 14th century

Site notes
- Material: Stone

The tomb of Saint Nicholas is a slab effigy in low relief in County Kilkenny, Ireland, popularly believed to be the tombstone of Saint Nicholas of Myra. Located in the medieval lost town of Newtown Jerpoint, the grave is more likely that of a Cistercian priest from Jerpoint Abbey east of the town.

It is 2.0 miles (3.2 km) southwest of Thomastown in the grounds of the privately owned Jerpoint Park. St. Nicholas's Church and graveyard are in the town, where the earthly remains of Saint Nicholas of Myra are said to be buried. Belmore House stands at the top of the town.

The memorial has been moved since 1839, and it has sustained damage from the fall of a tree. A conservation plan was developed by the Heritage Council in 2007. In advance of conservation work in 2013, St. Nicholas' church and the tomb of Saint Nicholas were surveyed and modelled in 3D.

== History ==
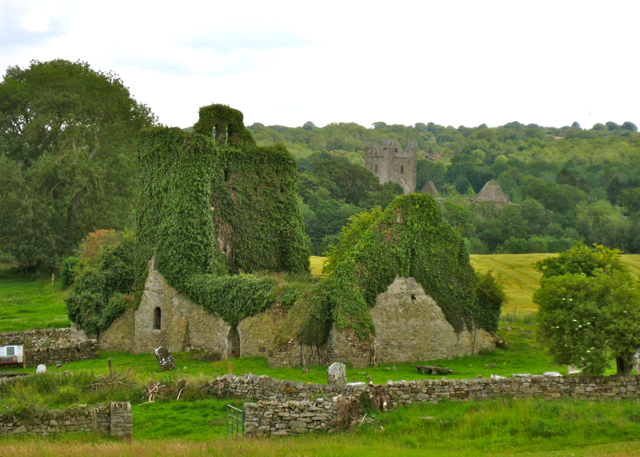
View of St. Nicholas Church from Belmore House

The lost town of Newtown Jerpoint was founded by either Earl Marshall or Griffin Fitzwilliam in the 12th century at the main crossing of the River Nore by a toll bridge, giving Jerpoint its name, meaning 'Nore bridge'. It was a vibrant town, with about 27 dwellings, a court house, woollen mill, a tannery, a brewery, and reputedly 14 taverns. Newtown Jerpoint lasted at least into the 17th century, but eventually declined, perhaps from the loss of its bridge and the re-routing of the road. Its visible remains and its proximity to one of Ireland's best-known and well-preserved Cistercian abbeys makes Newtown Jerpoint one of the most important sites in the study of medieval settlements in Ireland. The ruins of St Nicholas's medieval parish church dates from the 12th to 13th century, with a late medieval rood gallery and a tower where the parish priest would have resided.

Belmore House was commissioned as a hunting lodge by Earl Belmore in the 18th century and designed by the Irish architect Sir Richard Morrison. An extension of the house was planned as a square villa at the east end of the house with the rest of the house to become a service wing, but it was never built. The Earl of Belmore's main residence was Castle Coole, in County Fermanagh.

== Legends ==
The bones of Saint Nicholas, who inspired the legend of Santa Claus, were believed to have been buried in Newtown Jerpoint in the 12th century. The grave's stone slab is carved with the image of a cleric with the heads of two knights behind each shoulder, said to be those of the two crusaders who, so the story goes, brought Nicholas's remains to Ireland. Evidence lends some credence to this tale as the Normans in Kilkenny were keen collectors of religious relics, and it is known that Norman knights participated in the Holy Land Crusades.

== Churches dedicated to Saint Nicholas ==
In a papal bull dated 1191, Pope Celestine III created the parish of St. Nicholas in Dublin. Other Irish churches in the Medieval Pale included Skryne, Dunsany and the Church of St. Nicholas Within, Dublin (i.e., within the city walls). After the Reformation, the latter church was rivalled by Church of St. Nicholas Without, less than a kilometre away, and by the Roman Catholic Church of St. Nicholas of Myra Without in nearby Francis Street.
