= Gemiler Island =

Island in Turkey

Gemiler Island (originally Gemile)
Native name: Gemiler Adası (originally Gemile) Nickname: St. Nicholas Island
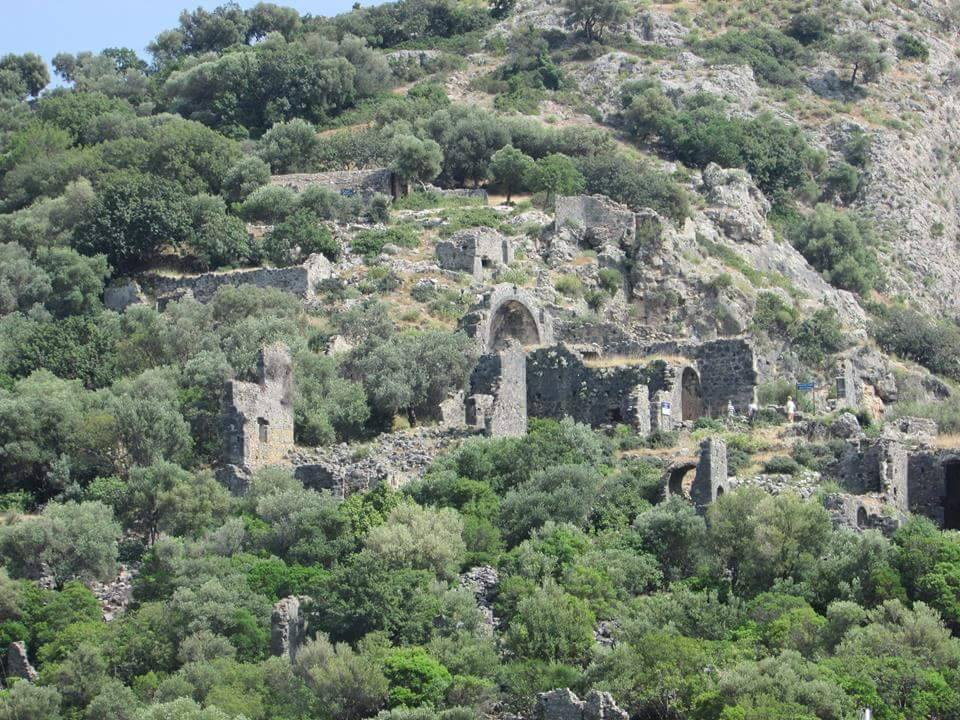
- A view from the ruins on island.
- Interactive map of Gemiler Island (originally Gemile)

Geography
- Location: Mediterranean Sea near Fethiye
- Coordinates: 36.553448°N 29.069352°E
- Length: 1 km (0.6 mi)

Administration
- Turkey

Gemiler Island (Turkish: Gemile Adası or Gemiler Adası, Greek: Γκεμιλέρ) is an island located off the coast of Turkey near the city of Fethiye. On the island are the remains of several churches built between the fourth and sixth centuries AD, along with a variety of associated buildings. Archaeologists believe it was the location of the original tomb of Saint Nicholas. The original Turkish name is Gemile from the Greek word καμήλα (kamila) meaning camel, so called because of its geographical shape (see Fethiye Gemile Island Archaeological Site).

== History ==
The Byzantine ruins of five Greek churches built between the fourth and sixth centuries AD remain on the island, along with a 350 metres (1,150 ft) processional walkway. Other remains from the same period include around forty other ecclesiastical buildings and over fifty Christian tombs. One of the churches was cut directly from the rock at the island's highest point, and is located at the far western end of the processional walkway. It is possible that the Island was used by Christian pilgrims en route to the Holy Lands.

Modern archaeologists believe that the island may be the location of St. Nicholas' original tomb. The traditional Turkish name for the island is Gemiler Adası, meaning "Island of Boats", which may be a reference to St. Nicholas's role as the patron saint of sailors; the island was also referred to as St. Nicholas Island by seafarers in the medieval period. Archaeologists believe he was interred in the rock-hewn church following his death in 326. His relics remained there until the 650s, when the island was abandoned as it was threatened by an Arab fleet. They were then moved to the town of Myra some 25 miles (40 km) to the east.

== Economy ==
The island is currently a popular destination for large Turkish gulets (for instance from Ölüdeniz), bringing many tourists to the island as well as many smaller private boats since the crescent-shaped bay can be used as a safe anchorage. The Byzantine ruins can be seen from the sea. A small makeshift restaurant stands in the bay for the summer sailors. A charge of 125 TL is currently levied upon visitors to the ruins.
