= Jerpoint Abbey =

Ruined Cistercian abbey in Kilkenny, Ireland

- Mainistir Sheireapúin
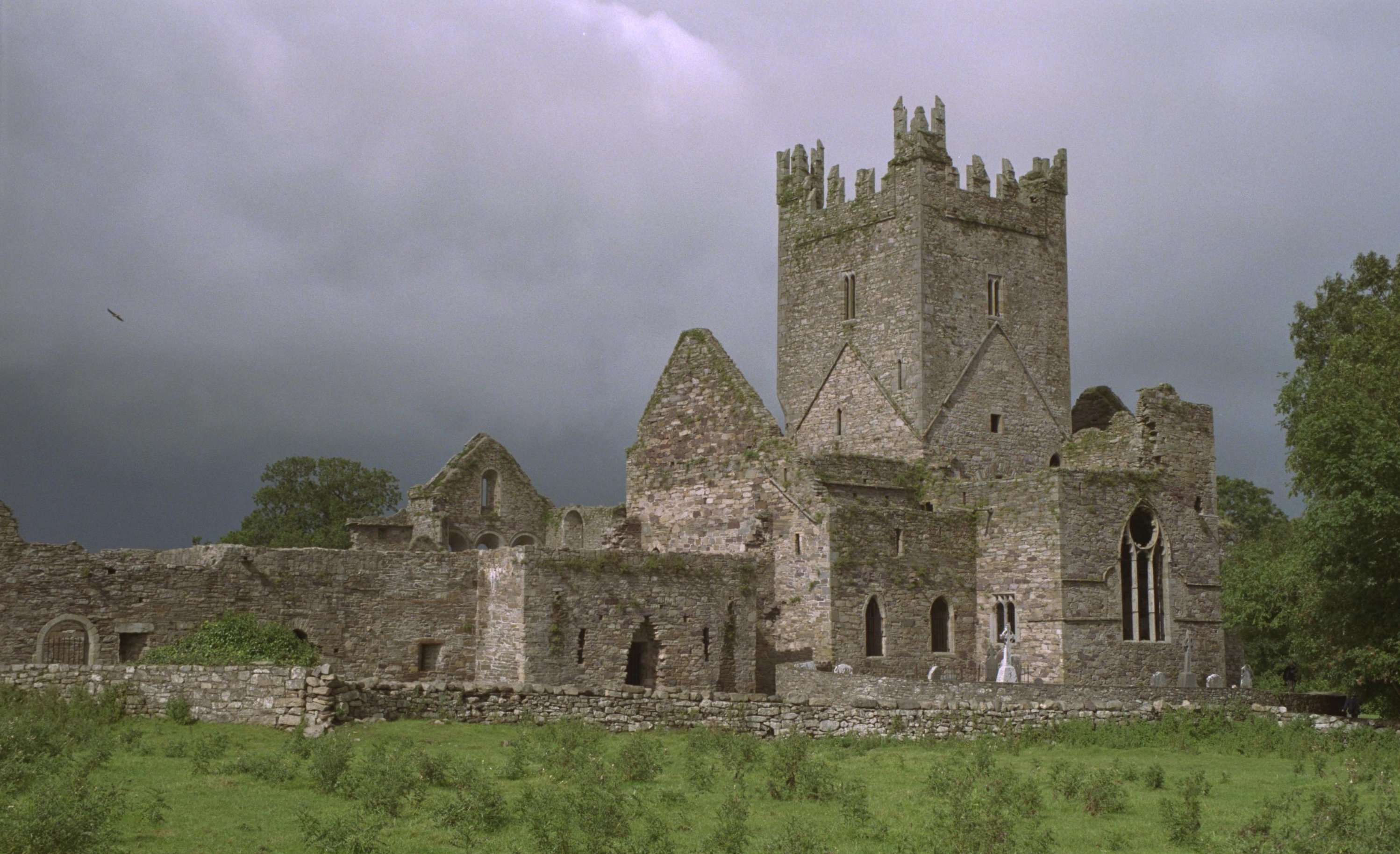
- East front of Jerpoint Abbey

- Location within Ireland

Monastery information
- Order: Cistercians
- Established: 1180
- Disestablished: 1541
- Diocese: Ossory

People
- Founders: Donchadh Ó Donnchadha Mac Giolla Phátraic, King of Osraige

Architecture
- Status: Inactive
- Style: Cistercian

Site
- Location: Thomastown, County Kilkenny, Ireland
- Coordinates: 52.51093°N 07.15798°W
- Public access: No

National monument of Ireland
- Official name: Jerpoint Abbey
- Reference no.: 80

Jerpoint Abbey (Irish: Mainistir Sheireapúin) is a ruined Cistercian abbey, founded in the second half of the 12th century in County Kilkenny, Ireland. It is located 2.5 km south west of Thomastown on the R448 regional road. There is a visitor centre with an exhibition. It has been declared a national monument and has been in the care of the Office of Public Works since 1880.

Scholars believe that Domnall Mac Gilla Pátraic (d.1176), the son of Cerball Mac Gilla Pátraic was possibly the founder of Jerpoint Abbey. Jerpoint Abbey may have been in existence since the 1160s but was only formally affiliated to the Cistercian order in 1180. It was dedicated to the Blessed Virgin. Jerpoint is notable for its stone carvings, including one at the tomb of Felix Ua Duib Sláin, Bishop of the Diocese of Ossory and Cistercian founder of the abbey. The abbey flourished until the dissolution of the monasteries by the English king Henry VIII.

Until c. 1310, Jerpoint housed monks of Irish descent, whereas the Cistercian monastery in Graiguenamanagh housed monks of Norman descent.

Jerpoint Abbey gives its name to the civil parish of Jerpoint Abbey or Abbey-Jerpoint in the barony of Knocktopher. It lies near the anciently corporate town of Newtown Jerpoint.

== Etymology ==
Several theories about the origin of the name "Jerpoint" exist, one of them being that Jeri is the Latinised version of the Irish name for the River Nore, An Fheoir (without the article "an") and that a bridge (Lat. pons) across the river gave its name to the monastic foundation.

== History ==
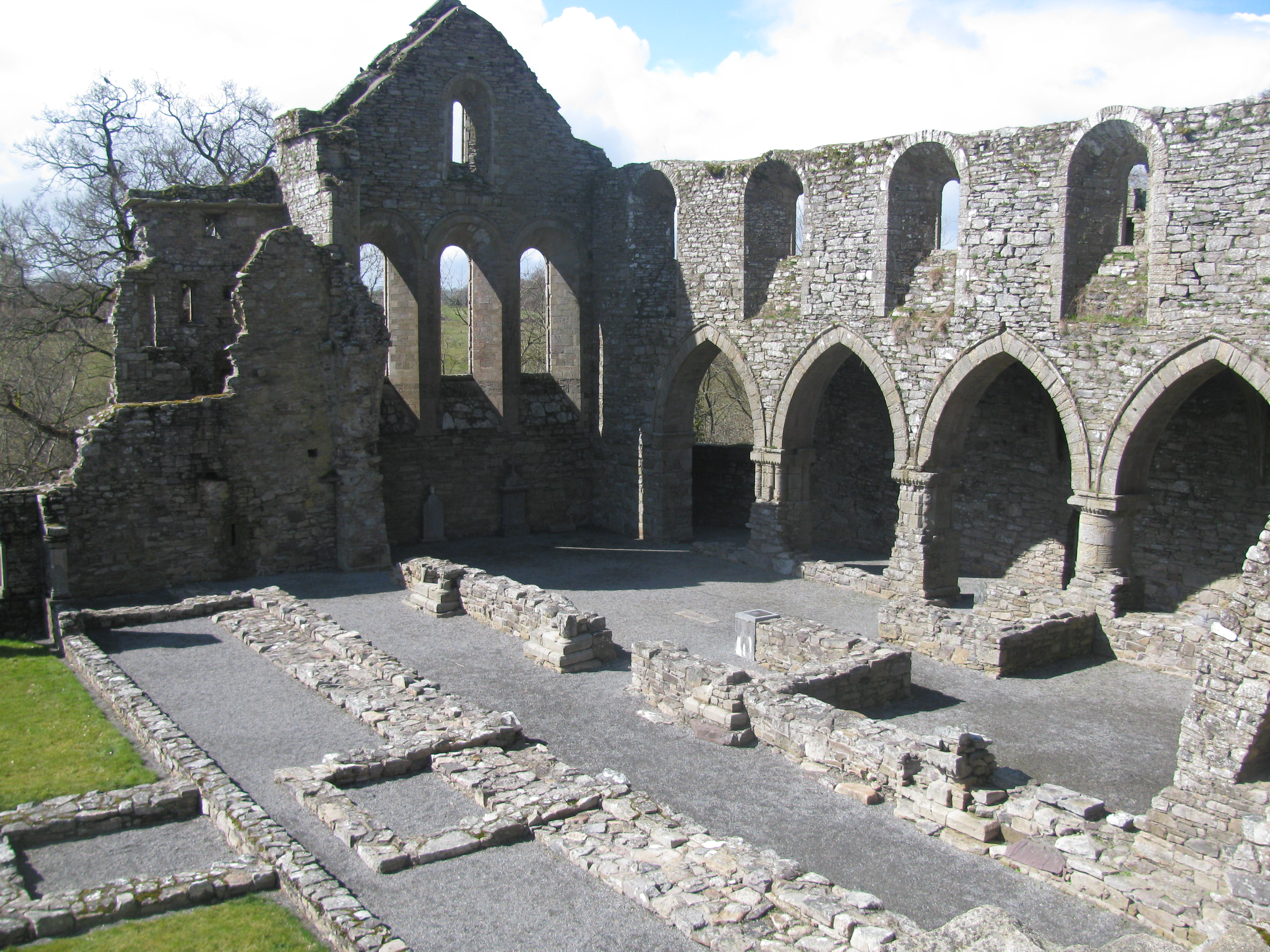
Abbey ruins from above

In 1180, Donogh O'Donoghoe Mac Gilla Patraic, the King of Kingdom of Ossory, moved the monks of the Cistercian Order from a distant part of Ossory to the present site. Here he constructed the abbey, probably on the site of an earlier Benedictine monastery built in 1160 by Domnall Mac Gilla Patraic, King of Osraige.

The abbey continued to flourish and owned about 14,000 acres until the dissolution of the monasteries by Henry VIII. It was surrendered to the king by Oliver Grace, the last abbot. In 1541 it was leased by Philip and Mary to James Butler, the 9th Earl Earl of Ormond. The abbey became a favourite place of sepulture with all the great families in the surrounding country. In 1202, Felix Ua Duib Sláin, Bishop of Ossory and first abbot of Jerpoint, was interred here.

It has been declared a national monument and has been in the care of the Office of Public Works since 1880.

== Architecture ==
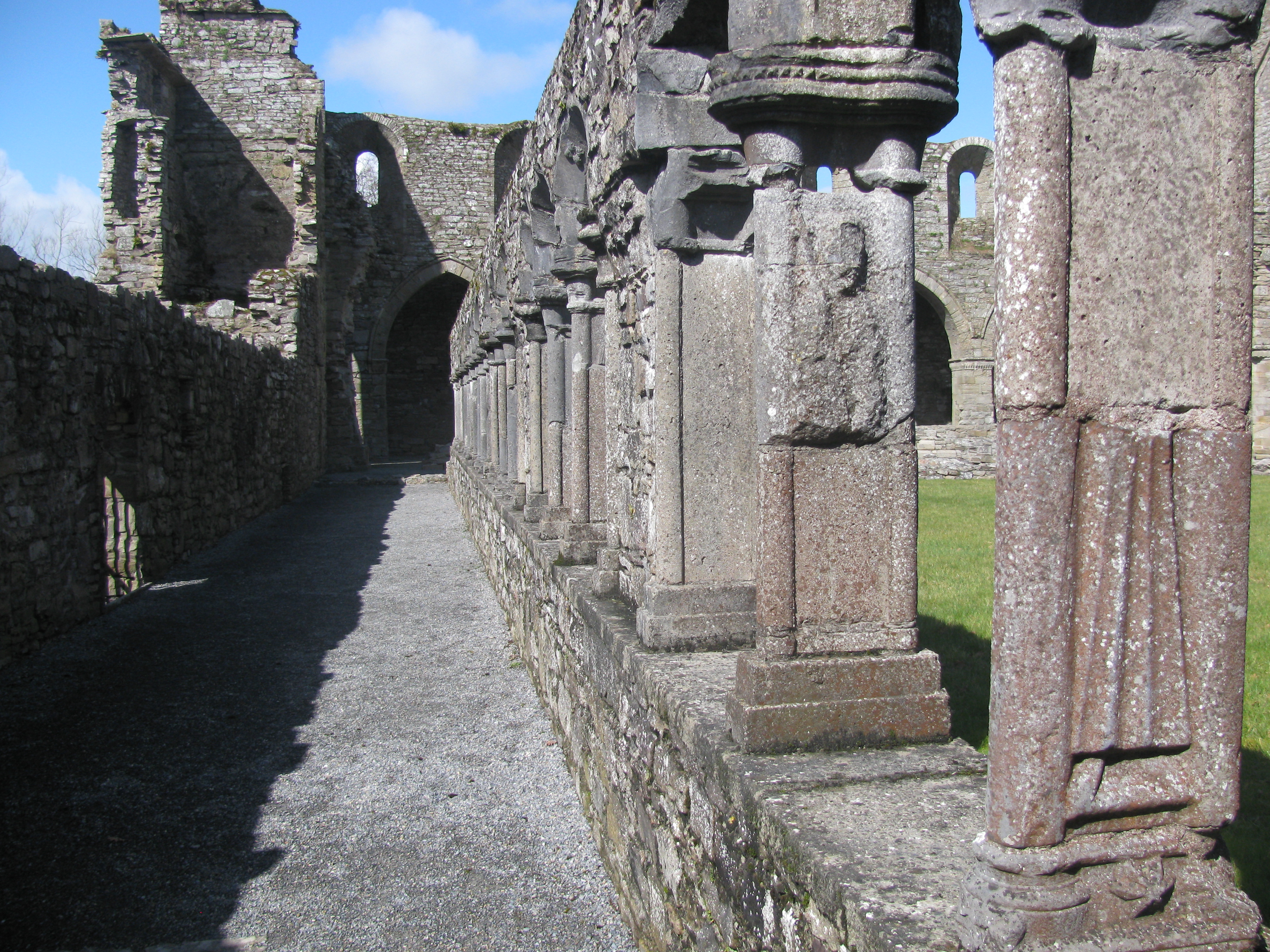
The Cloister Arcade

The present ruins are very extensive and display some specimens of the later Norman passing into the early English style of architecture. Jerpoint is notable for its stone carvings, including one at the tomb of Felix Ua Duib Sláin, Bishop of the Diocese of Ossory.

There is a well-proportioned, square, embattled tower. The church with its Romanesque details dates from the 12th century. In the transept chapels are 13th to 16th-century tomb sculptures. The tower and cloister date from the 15th century. In the Abbey is the sculptured cloister arcade with unique figure carvings between the columns.

== Tombs ==
The Cistercian founder of the abbey, Bishop Felix O'Dullany (also O Dulany) who also moved the episcopal see from Aghaboe to Kilkenny is buried Jerpoint. His grave became a place of pilgrimage and devotees would take soil from his grave for its miraculous powers, especially for healing sore eyes. A reference in the Schools' Collection might refer to this practise.

Another abbot buried at Jerpoint whose effigy tomb is still well preserved and next to that of Felix is William, Bishop of Cork, also known as William of Jerpoint. His crozier, according to Carrigan, is an exact copy of Bishop Ledrede's at St. Canice's Cathedral.

These two were the only monks from Jerpoint "ever elevated to the Episcopal dignity".

Nearby is the effigial graveslab of a layman bearing the inscription "HIC IACET THOMAS [...] P[RO]PICIETUR DEUS. A. MC•C•C• PAT. N. AC [AVE]".

Several tombs were carved by Callan sculptor Rory O'Tunney, such as the Walsh/ Butler tomb under the rib vaulted ceiling which he signed twice.

Another graveslab depicts an eight-pointed cross and the coats-of-arms of the Walsh family. It bears the inscription "Hic iacet edmu[n]dus uaullshe & iohana le botteler uxor eius q[uorum a]nimarum p[ro]picietur deus. Anno dni M•[c]cc[c]lxxvi" translating to "Hier lie Edmund Walsh & Johanna le Boteller (Butler) his wife. On whose souls God may have mercy. A.D. 1476".

A coffin-shaped slab with an incised 13th century cross which was recycled in the 16th century has faint lettering and has been identified as that of Nicholas Baron who died in 1523 after having served as the abbot for 22 years.

Several tombs bear the Tudor rose, an indication of their date.

== Gallery of tombs ==
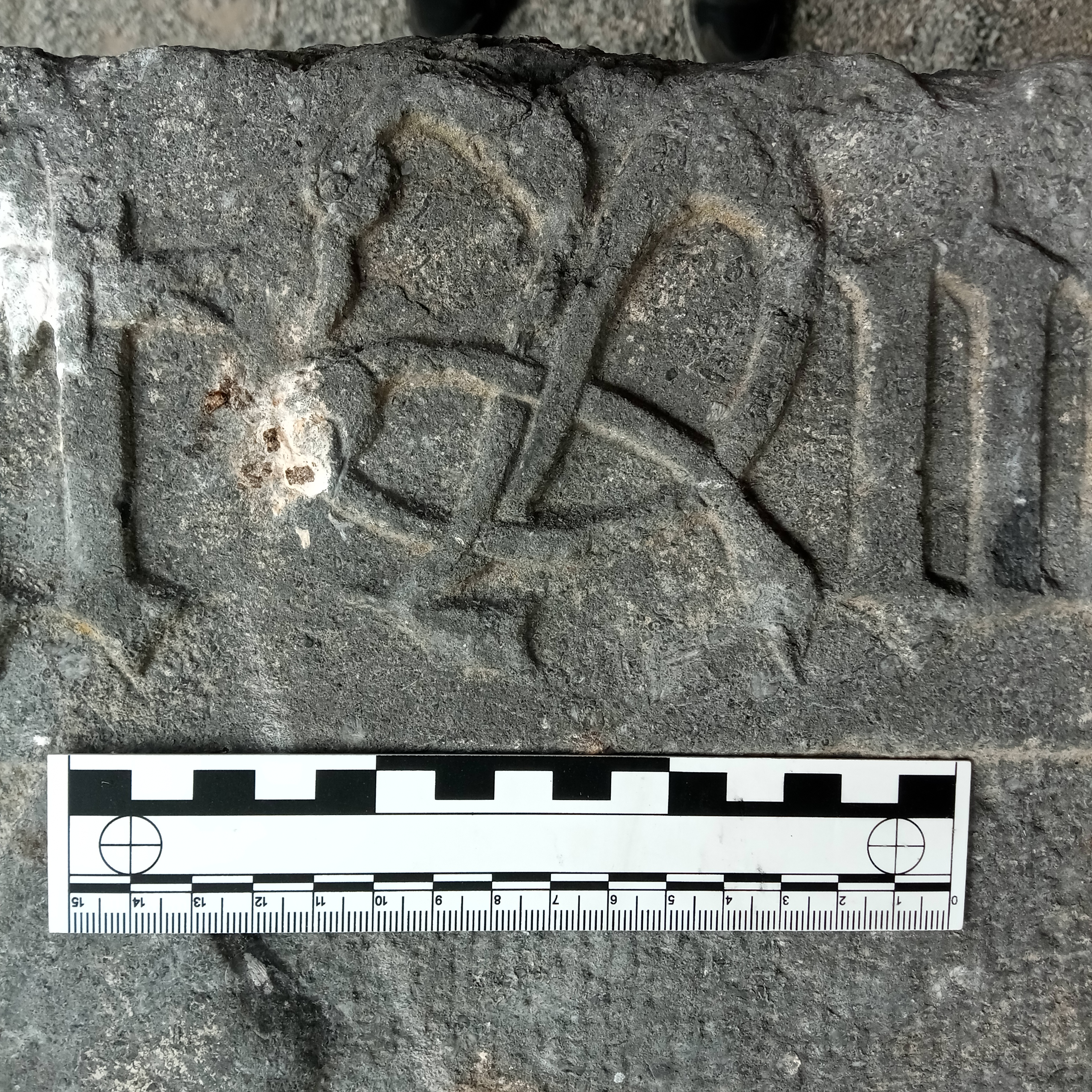
Rory O'Tunney's signature on the Walsh-Butler tomb (upside down)

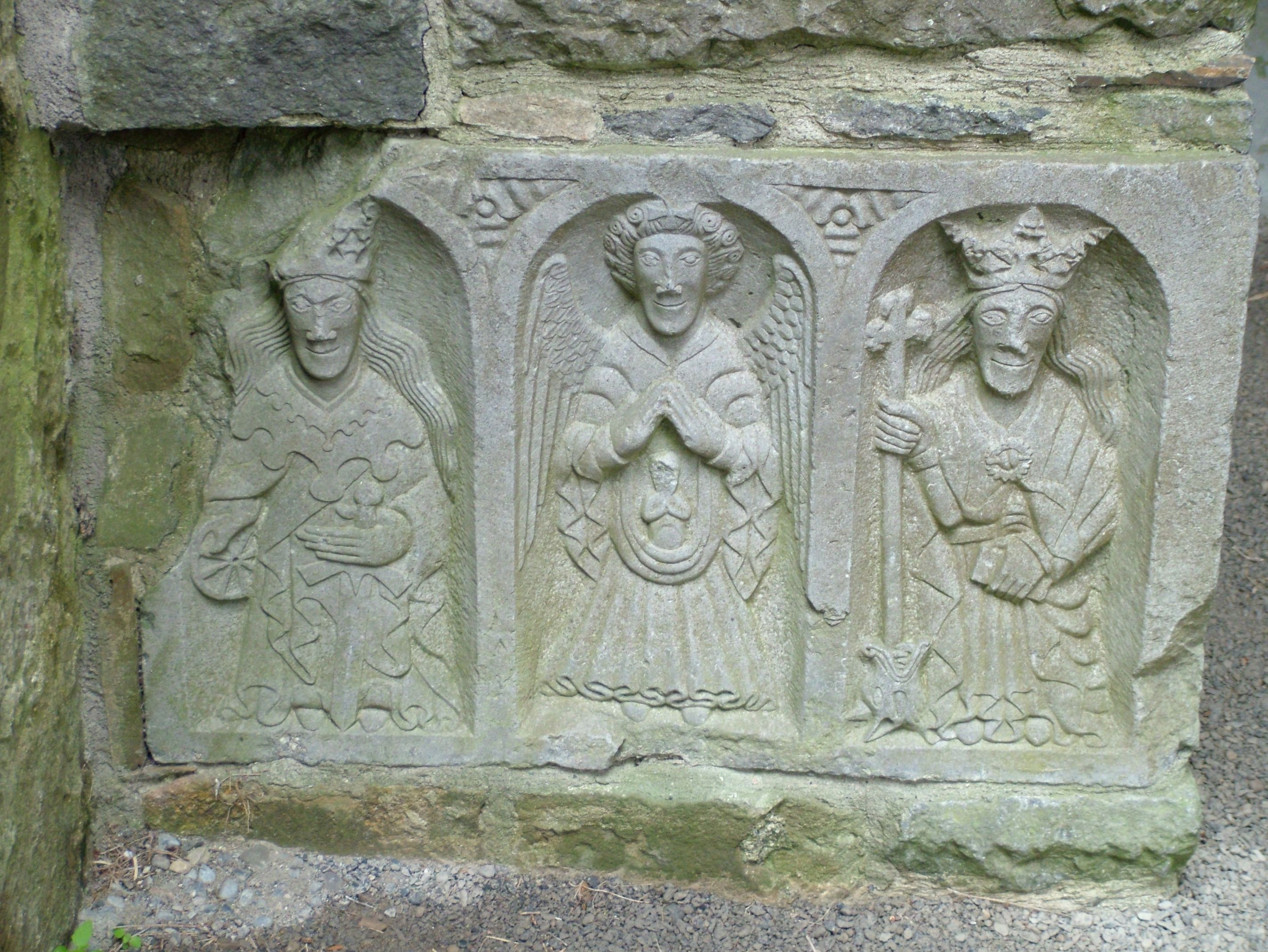
The Weepers from the O'Tunney workshop

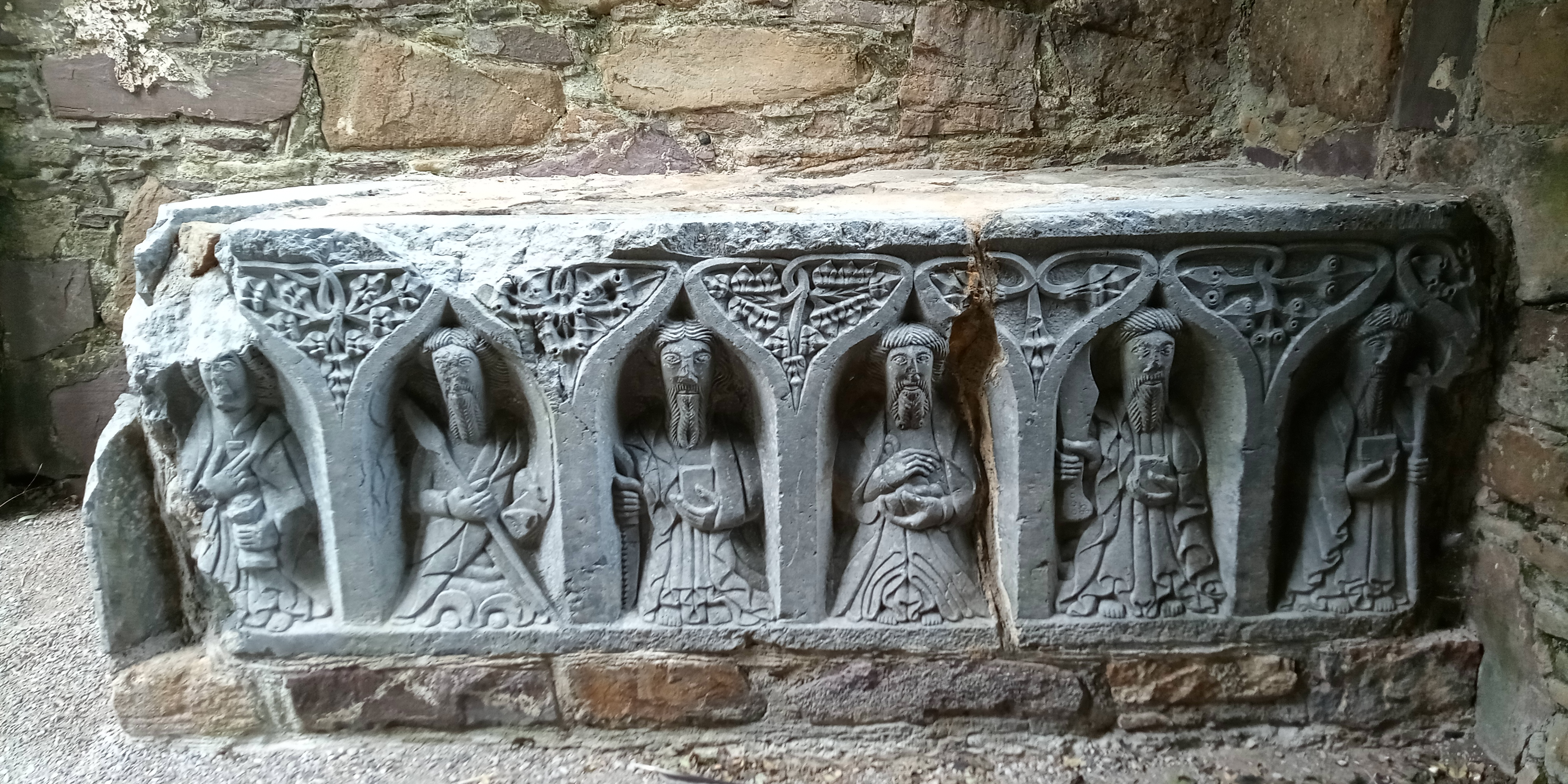
Side panel of a table tomb from the O'Tunney workshop

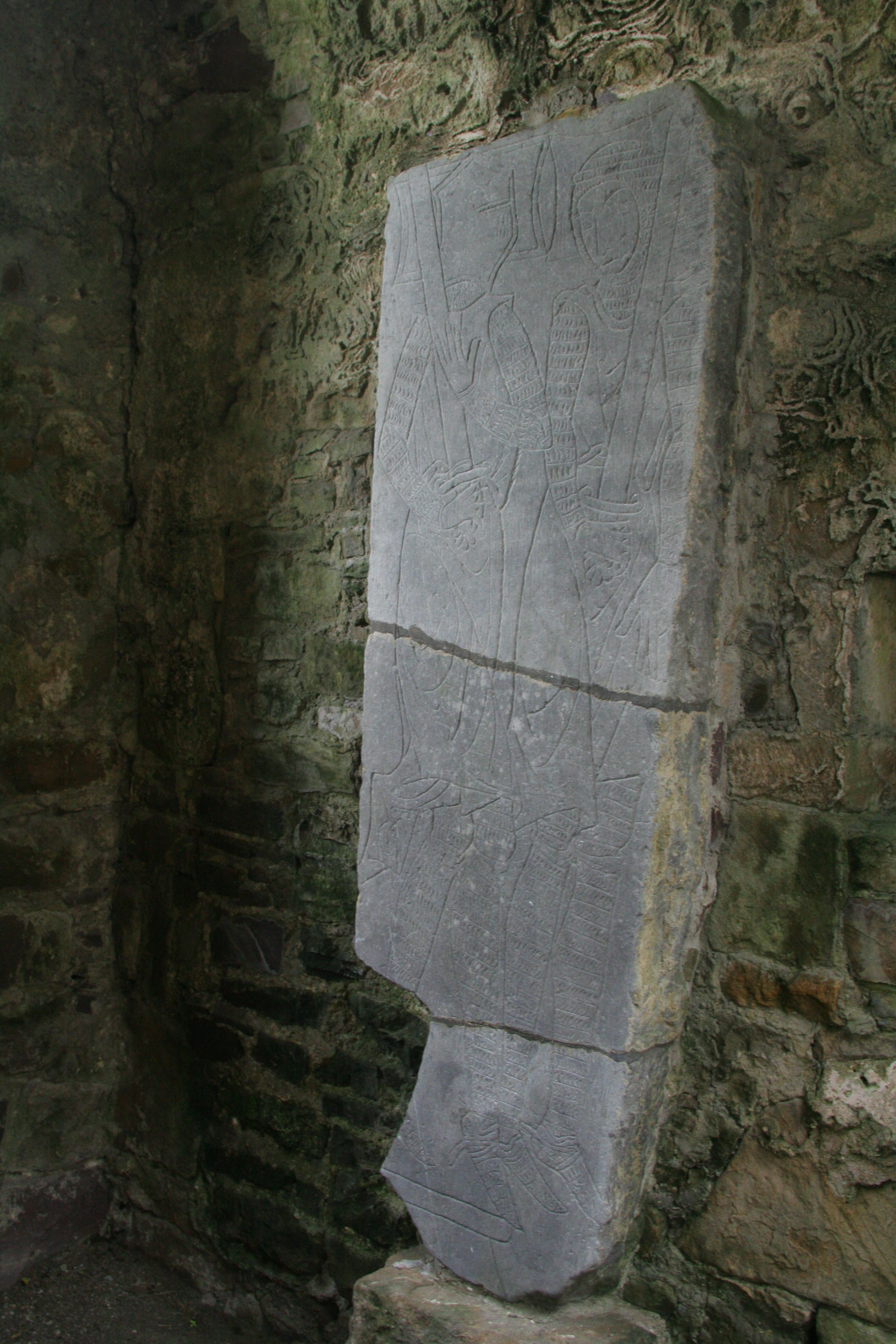
Graveslab of "The Brethren" depicting two knights

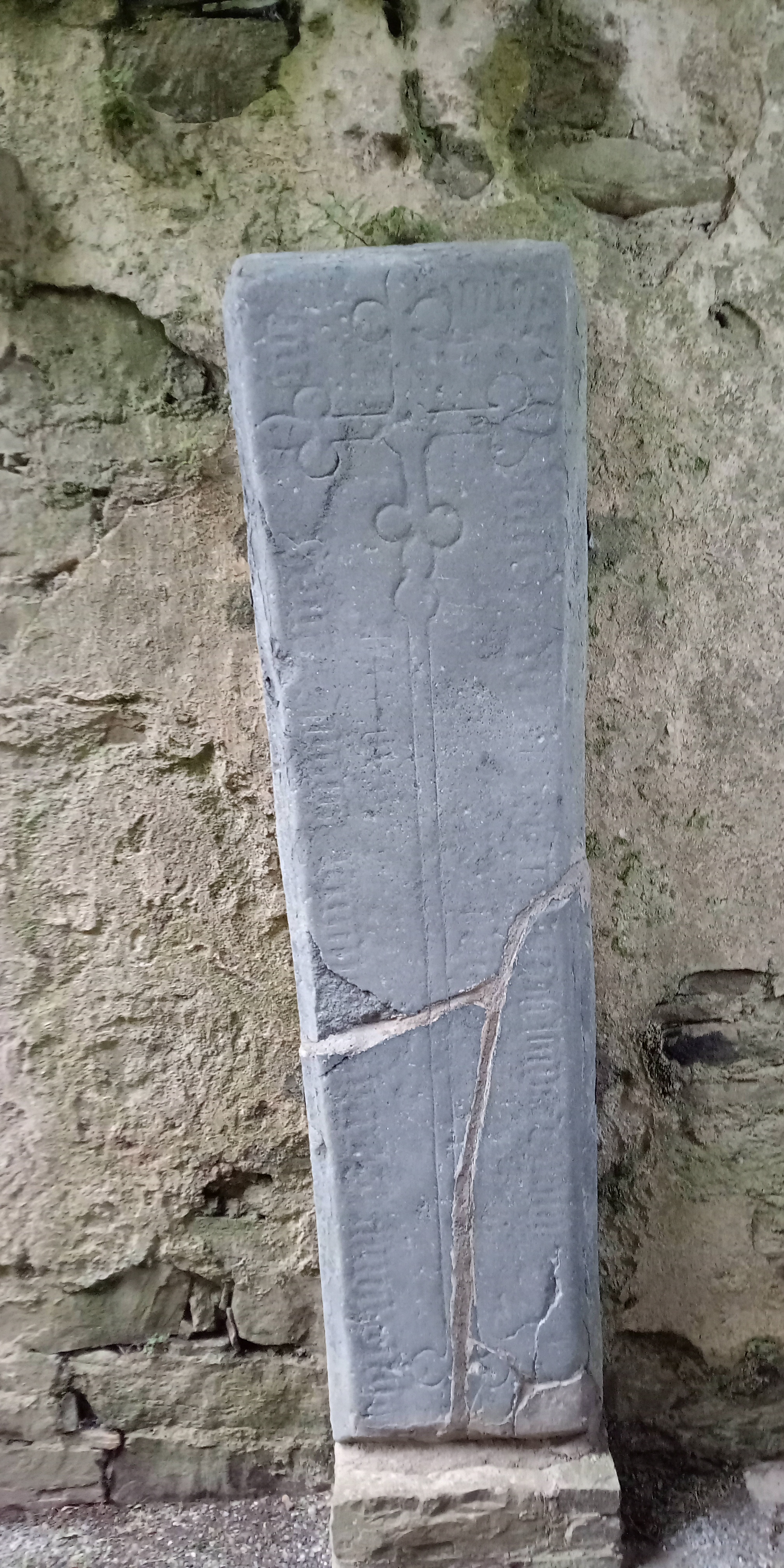
Graveslab of Nicholas Baron, abbot until 1532, using an earlier, 13th century gravestone

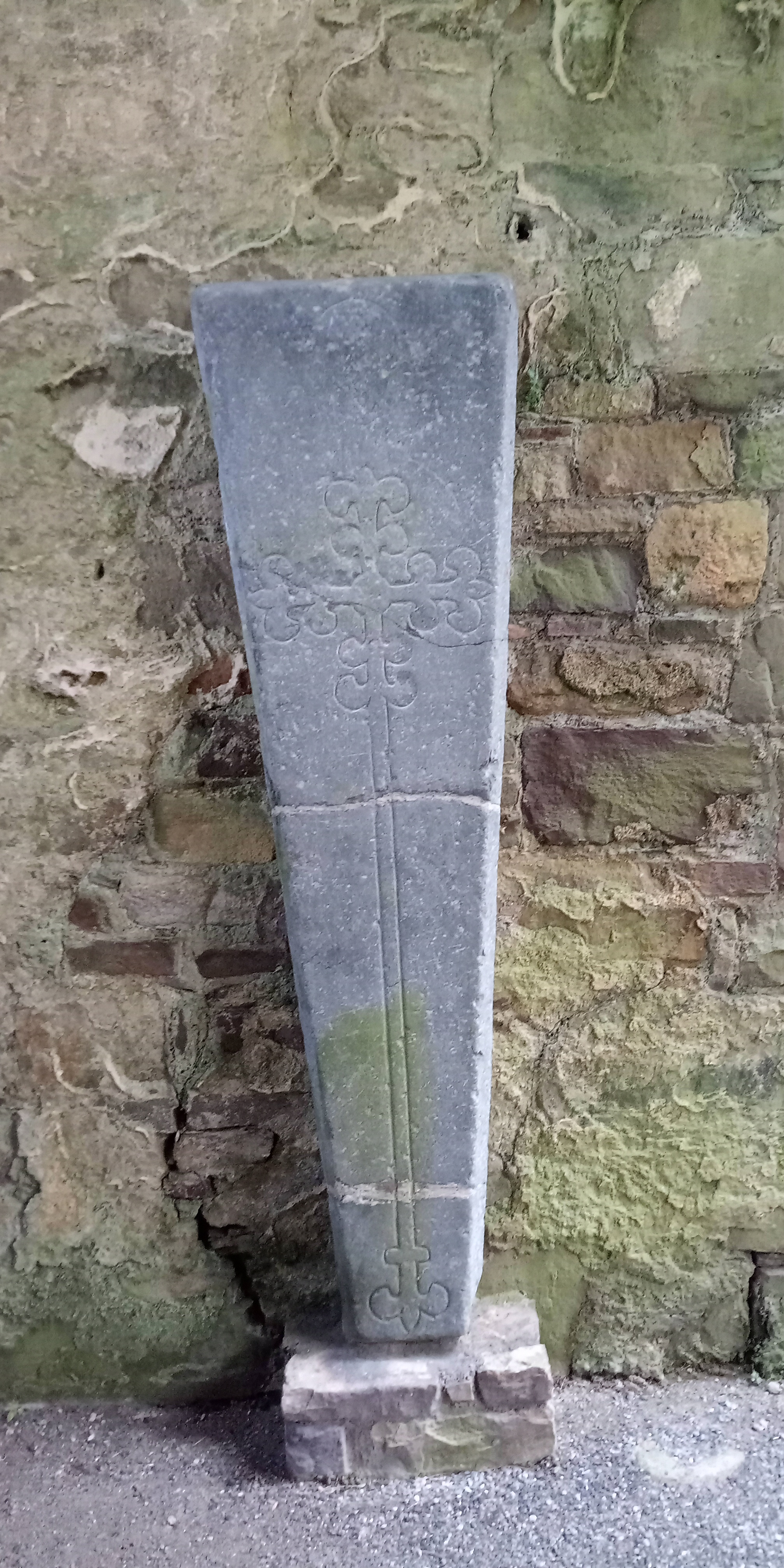
Another cross slab which is a recycled grave slab once depicting a cleric

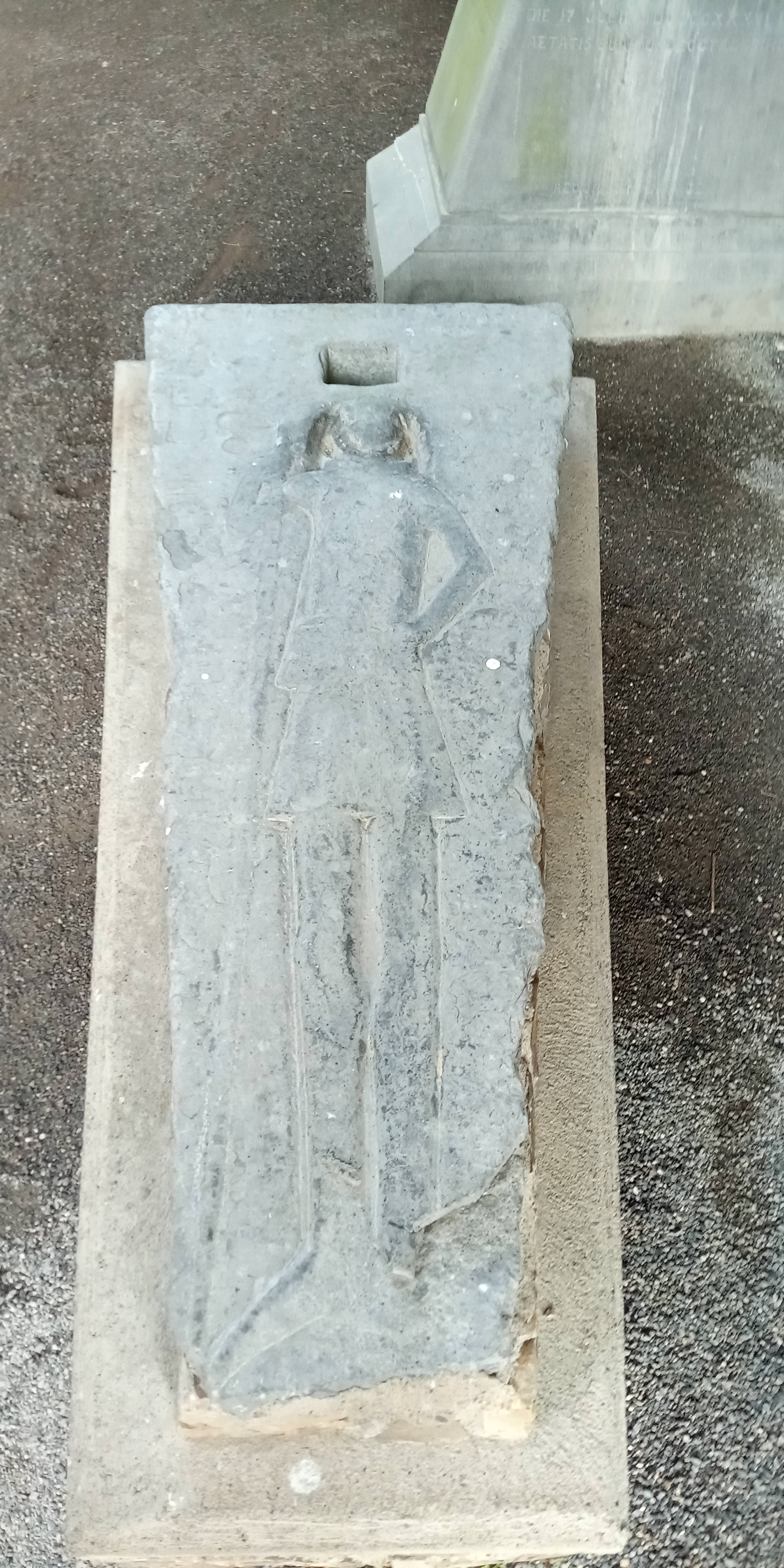
Graveslab of a layman

== Legends and Folklore ==
Close to Jerpoint Abbey, at Newtown Jerpoint, are the ruins of a church where a local legend places the grave of Saint Nicholas.

An account in the Schools' Collection tells a story of how Cromwellian soldiers killed all the monks of the abbey. This allegedly took place longer after the dissolution of monasteries.

Another account explains the destruction by Cromwellian soldiers as the result of a misunderstanding.

Another story tells of how two local boys became priests after serving mass with an otherworldly priest at the abbey during Penal Times.

A poem in the Schools' Collection tells of a journey to Jerpoint passing several other points of interest such as Kilfane.
