= Newtown Jerpoint =

Former medieval town in Ireland

Coordinates: 52.5100°N 7.1688°W

The medieval lost town of Newtown Jerpoint is just west of the Cistercian Jerpoint Abbey, near Thomastown, County Kilkenny, Ireland. It is located 3.2 km south west from Thomastown just off the R448 regional road. In the grounds of the privately owned Jerpoint Park. St. Nicholas’s Church and graveyard are in the town, where the earthly remains of Saint Nicholas of Myra are said to be buried. Belmore House stands at the top of the town.

== History ==
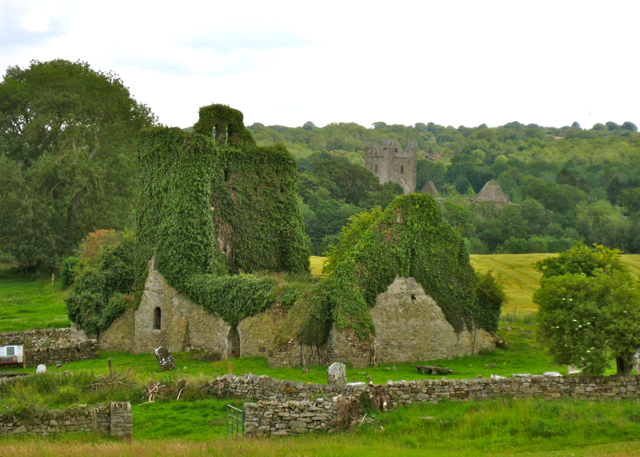
View of St Nicholas Church from Belmore House

- The lost town of Newtown Jerpoint. It was founded by either Earl Marshall or Griffin Fitzwilliam in 12th century where the main crossing of the River Nore was formed by a toll bridge, giving Jerpoint its name as it means 'Nore bridge'.
- It was a vibrant town, with approx 27 dwelling houses, a court house, woollen mill, a tannery, a brewery and reputed to have had 14 taverns.
- Newtown Jerpoint lasted at least into the 17th century, but eventually declined, perhaps from the loss of its bridge and the re-routing of the road. Its visible remains and its close proximity to one of Ireland’s best-known and well-preserved Cistercian abbeys makes Newtown Jerpoint one of the most important sites in the study of medieval settlements in Ireland.
- The ruins of Saint Nicholas’ medieval parish church dates from the 12th to the 13th century, with a late medieval rood gallery and a tower where the parish priest would have resided.
- Belmore House was commissioned as a hunting lodge by Earl Belmore in the 18th century and designed by the Irish architect Sir Richard Morrison. An extension of the house was planned as a square villa at the east end of the house with the rest of the house to become a service wing, but it was never built. The Earl of Belmore's main residence was Castle Coole, in Co. Fermanagh

== Legends ==
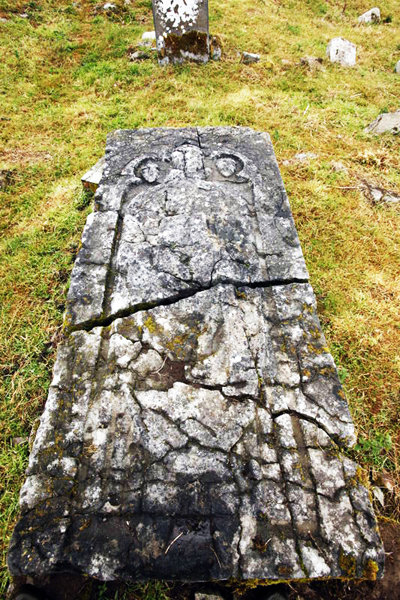
Tomb of Saint Nicholas (Santa Claus)

Saint Nicholas, who inspired the legend of Santa Claus, is believed to have been buried in Newtown Jerpoint some 800 years ago. The grave slab features a cleric with the heads of two knights behind each shoulder and is said to be Saint Nicholas and the heads, the two crusaders who, so the story goes, brought Nicholas' remains back to Ireland. Evidence lends some possible credence to this tale as the Normans in Kilkenny were keen collectors of religious relics. And it is known that Norman knights participated in the Holy Land Crusades

Another version of the story tells of a French family, the de Frainets, who removed Nicholas' remains from Myra to Bari, Italy, in 1169 when Bari was under the Normans. The de Frainets were crusaders to the Holy Land and also owned land in Thomastown, Ireland. After the Normans were forced out of Bari, the de Frainets moved to Nice, France, taking the relics with them. When the Normans lost power in France, Nicholas de Frainet moved to Ireland. This story has the relics being buried in Jerpoint in 1200.

== Archaeology ==
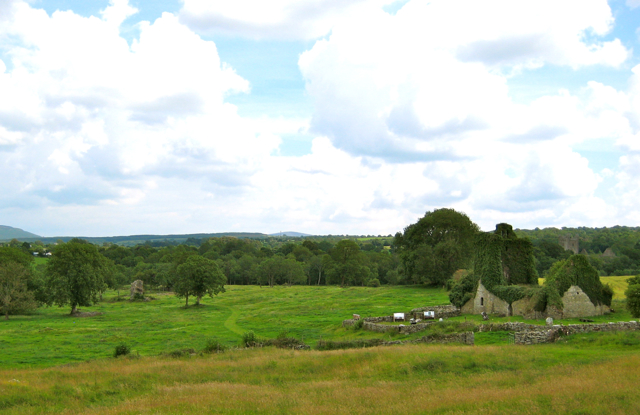
View of the Lost Town of Newtown Jerpoint

A survey was commissioned in 2007 by the Heritage Council Ireland and the Discovery Programme that used Lidar to show the extent of Newtown Jerpoint. "One of Ireland’s best surviving examples of a deserted 12th Century Medieval Town" ....... Quote from The Heritage Council of Ireland
