= Saint Nicholas =

4th-century Christian saint

Saint Nicholas of Myra
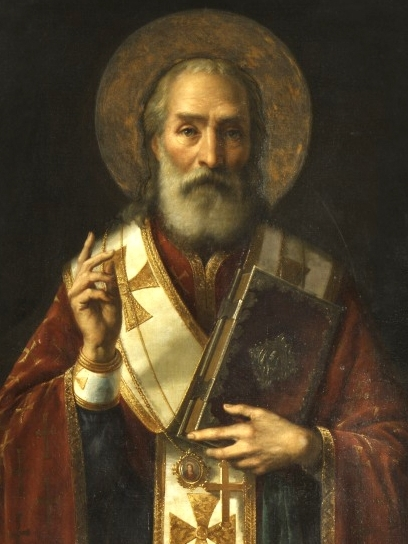
- St. Nicholas by Jaroslav Čermák

Defender of the Faith; Wonderworker; Holy Hierarch; Bishop of Myra; Venerable
- Born: Traditionally 15 March 270; Patara, Lycia et Pamphylia, Roman Empire
- Died: Traditionally 6 December 343 (aged 73); Myra, Diocese of Asia, Roman Empire
- Venerated in: All Christian denominations which venerate saints
- Major shrine: Basilica di San Nicola, Bari, Italy
- Feast: 6 December in the Gregorian calendar; 19 December in the Julian calendar (main feast day – Saint Nicholas Day) 22 May [O.S. 9 May] (translation of relics)
- Attributes: Vested as a bishop. In Eastern Christianity, wearing an omophorion and holding a Gospel Book.
- Patronage: Children; coopers; travelers; sailors; fishermen; merchants; toymakers; broadcasters; the falsely accused; repentant thieves; brewers; pharmacists; archers; pawnbrokers; unmarried people; Prilep; Aberdeen; Galway; Albania; Russia; Greece; Hellenic Navy; Liverpool; Bari; Čilipi; Siġġiewi; Moscow; Amsterdam; Lorraine; Royal School of Church Music and Duchy of Lorraine; students in various cities and countries around Europe; Russian Navy

Saint Nicholas of Myra (Note: Greek: Ἅγιος Νικόλαος, Hágios Nikólaos; Latin: Sanctus Nicolaus) (traditionally 15 March 270 – 6 December 343), (Note: The date of his birth and the year of his death are disputed, but 6 December has long been established as the traditional date of his death. Jeremy Seal remarks, "As vampires shun daylight, so saints are distinguished from ordinary mortals by the anniversaries they keep. The date of their death rather than their birth is commemorated.") also known as Nicholas of Bari, was an early Christian bishop of Greek descent from the maritime city of Patara in Anatolia (in modern-day Antalya Province, Turkey) during the time of the Roman Empire. Because of the many miracles attributed to his intercession, he is also known as Nicholas the Wonderworker. (Note: Νικόλαος ὁ Θαυματουργός, Nikólaos ho Thaumaturgós) Saint Nicholas is the patron saint of sailors, merchants, archers, repentant thieves, children, brewers, pawnbrokers, toymakers, unmarried people, and students in various cities and countries around Europe. His reputation evolved among the pious, as was common for early Christian saints, and his legendary habit of secret gift-giving gave rise to the folklore of Santa Claus ("Saint Nick") through Sinterklaas.

Little is known about the historical Saint Nicholas. The earliest accounts of his life were written centuries after his death and probably contain legendary elaborations. He is said to have been born in the Anatolian seaport of Patara, Lycia, in Asia Minor to wealthy Christian parents. In one of the earliest attested and most famous incidents from his life, he is said to have rescued three girls from being forced into prostitution by dropping a sack of gold coins through the window of their house each night for three nights so their father could pay a dowry for each of them. Other early stories tell of him calming a storm at sea, saving three innocent soldiers from wrongful execution, and chopping down a tree possessed by a demon. In his youth, he is said to have made a pilgrimage to Egypt and Syria Palaestina. Shortly after his return, he became Bishop of Myra. He was later cast into prison during the persecution of Diocletian, but was released after the accession of Constantine.

An early list makes him an attendee at the First Council of Nicaea in 325, but he is never mentioned in any writings by people who were at the council. Late, unsubstantiated legends claim that he was temporarily defrocked and imprisoned during the council for slapping the heretic Arius. Another famous late legend tells how he resurrected three children, who had been murdered and pickled in brine by a butcher planning to sell them as pork during a famine.

Less than 200 years after Nicholas's death, the St. Nicholas Church was built in Myra under the orders of Theodosius II over the site of the church where he had served as bishop, and his remains were moved to a sarcophagus in that church. In 1087, while the Greek Christian inhabitants of the region were subjugated by the newly arrived Muslim Seljuk Turks, and soon after the beginning of the East–West schism, a group of merchants from the Italian city of Bari removed the major bones of Nicholas's skeleton from his sarcophagus in the church without authorization and brought them to their hometown, where they are now enshrined in the Basilica di San Nicola. The remaining bone fragments from the sarcophagus were later removed by Venetian sailors and taken to Venice during the First Crusade.

== Biographical sources ==
Very little is known about Saint Nicholas's historical life. Any writings Nicholas himself may have produced have been lost and he is not mentioned by any contemporary chroniclers. This is not surprising, since Nicholas lived during a turbulent time in Roman history. The earliest mentions of Saint Nicholas indicate that, by the sixth century, his following was already well established. Less than two hundred years after Saint Nicholas's probable death, the Eastern Roman Emperor Theodosius II (ruled 401–450) ordered the building of the Church of Saint Nicholas in Myra, which thereby preserves an early mention of his name. The Byzantine historian Procopius also mentions that the Emperor Justinian I (ruled 527–565) renovated churches in Constantinople dedicated to Saint Nicholas and Saint Priscus, which may have originally been built as early as c. 490.

Nicholas's name also occurs as "Nicholas of Myra of Lycia" on the tenth line of a list of attendees at the Council of Nicaea included by Theodore Lector in the Historiae Ecclesiasticae Tripartitae Epitome, written sometime between 510 and 515. A single, offhand mention of Nicholas of Myra also occurs in the biography of another saint, Saint Nicholas of Sion, who apparently took the name "Nicholas" to honor him. The Life of Saint Nicholas of Sion, written around 250 years after Nicholas of Myra's death, briefly mentions Nicholas of Sion visiting Nicholas's tomb to pay homage to him. According to Jeremy Seal, the fact that Nicholas had a tomb that could be visited serves as the almost solitary definitive proof that he was a real historical figure.

In his treatise De statu animarum post mortem (written c. 583), the theologian Eustratius of Constantinople cites Saint Nicholas of Myra's miracle of the three generals as evidence that souls may work independent from the body. Eustratius credits a lost Life of Saint Nicholas as his source. Nearly all the sources Eustratius references date from the late fourth century to early fifth century, indicating the Life of Saint Nicholas to which he refers was probably written during this time period, shortly after Nicholas's death. The earliest complete account of Nicholas's life that has survived to the present is a Life of Saint Nicholas, written in the early ninth century by Michael the Archimandrite (814–842), nearly 500 years after Nicholas's probable death.

Despite its extremely late date, Michael the Archimandrite's Life of Saint Nicholas is believed to heavily rely on older written sources and oral traditions. The identity and reliability of these sources, however, remains uncertain. Catholic historian D. L. Cann and medievalist Charles W. Jones both consider Michael the Archimandrite's Life the only account of Saint Nicholas that is likely to contain any historical truth. Jona Lendering, a Dutch historian of classical antiquity, notes that Michael the Archimandrite's Life does not contain a "conversion narrative", which was unusual for saints' lives of the period when it was written. He therefore argues that it is possible Michael the Archimandrite may have been relying on a source written before conversion narratives became popular, which would be a positive indication of that source's reliability. He notes that many of the stories recounted by Michael the Archimandrite closely resemble stories told about the first-century AD Neopythagorean philosopher Apollonius of Tyana in the Life of Apollonius of Tyana, an eight-volume biography of him written in the early third century by the Greek writer Philostratus. It was not unusual for Christian saints to adapt older stories of pagan cults. As Apollonius's hometown of Tyana was not far from Myra, Lendering contends that many popular stories about Apollonius may have become attached to Saint Nicholas.

== Life and legends ==
=== Family and background ===
Accounts of Saint Nicholas's life agree on the essence of his story, but modern historians disagree about how much of it is rooted in historical fact. Traditionally, Nicholas was born in the city of Patara (Lycia et Pamphylia), a port on the Mediterranean Sea, in Asia Minor in the Roman Empire, to a wealthy family of Greek Christians. According to some accounts, his parents were named Epiphanius (Ἐπιφάνιος, Epiphánios) and Johanna (Ἰωάννα, Iōánna), but, according to others, they were named Theophanes (Θεοφάνης, Theophánēs) and Nonna (Νόννα, Nónna). In some accounts, Nicholas's uncle was the bishop of the city of Myra, also in Lycia. Recognizing his nephew's calling, Nicholas's uncle ordained him as a priest.

=== Generosity and travels ===
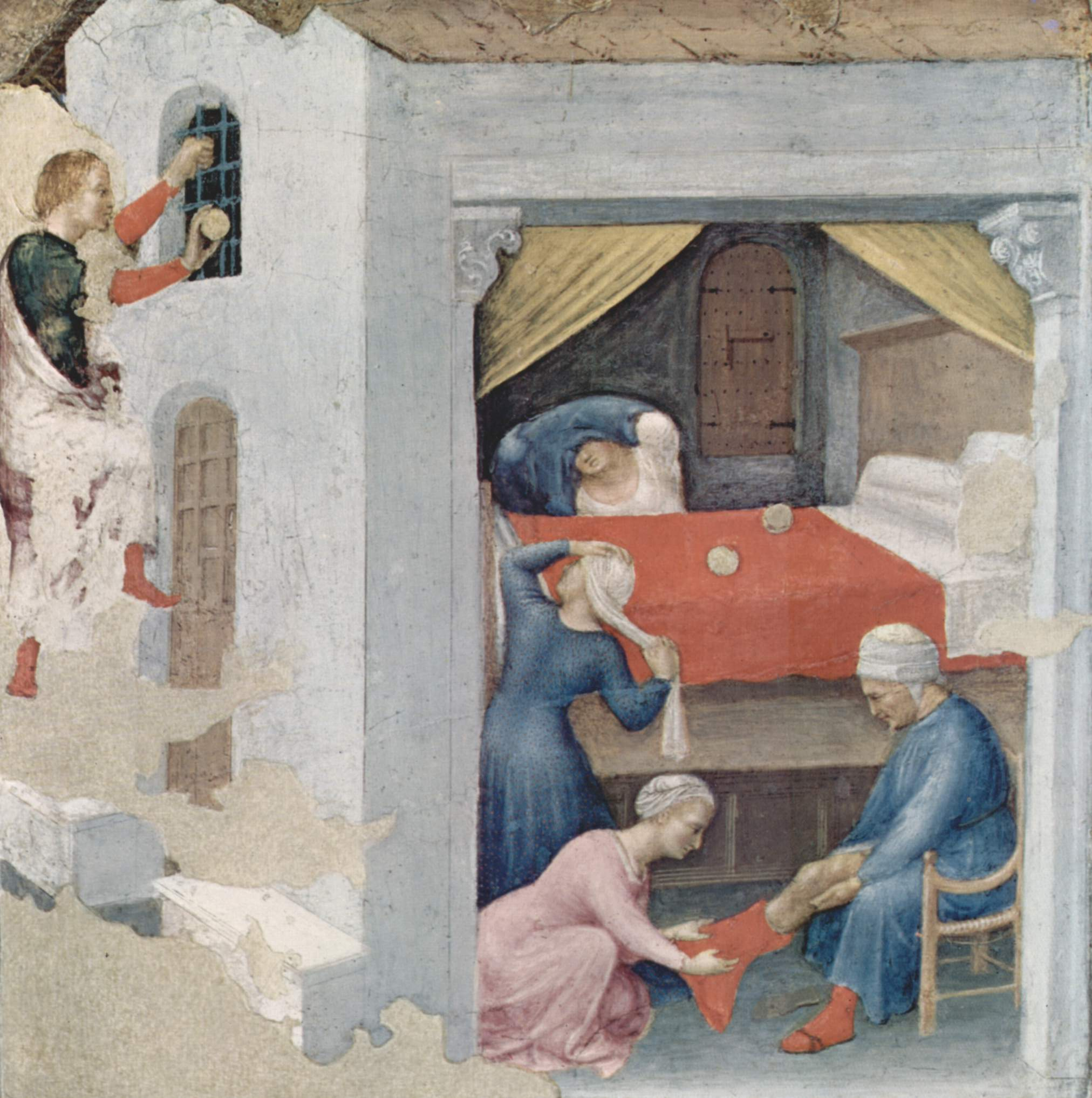
The dowry for the three virgins (Gentile da Fabriano, c. 1425, Pinacoteca Vaticana, Rome)

After his parents died from an epidemic, Nicholas is said to have distributed their wealth to the poor. In his most famous exploit, which is first attested in Michael the Archimandrite's Life of Saint Nicholas, Nicholas heard of a devout man who had once been wealthy but had lost all of his money due to the "plotting and envy of Satan." The man could not afford proper dowries for his three daughters. (Note: Joe L. Wheeler and Jona Lendering both note that the legends of Saint Nicholas are filled with sets of three, which may be symbolic for Nicholas's vehement defense of the Holy Trinity.) This meant that they would remain unmarried and probably, in absence of any other possible employment, be forced to become prostitutes. Hearing of the girls' plight, Nicholas decided to help them, but, being too modest to help the family in public (or to save them the humiliation of accepting charity), he went to the house under the cover of night and threw a purse filled with gold coins through the window opening into the house. The father immediately arranged a marriage for his first daughter, and after her wedding, Nicholas threw a second bag of gold through the same window late at night.

According to Michael the Archimandrite's account, after the second daughter was married, the father stayed awake for at least two "nights" and caught Saint Nicholas in the same act of charity toward the third daughter. The father fell on his knees, thanking him, and Nicholas ordered him not to tell anyone about the gifts. The scene of Nicholas's secret gift-giving is one of the most popular scenes in Christian devotional art, appearing in icons and frescoes from across Europe. Although depictions vary depending on time and place, Nicholas is often shown wearing a cowl while the daughters are typically shown in bed, dressed in their nightclothes. Many renderings contain a cypress tree or a cross-shaped cupola.

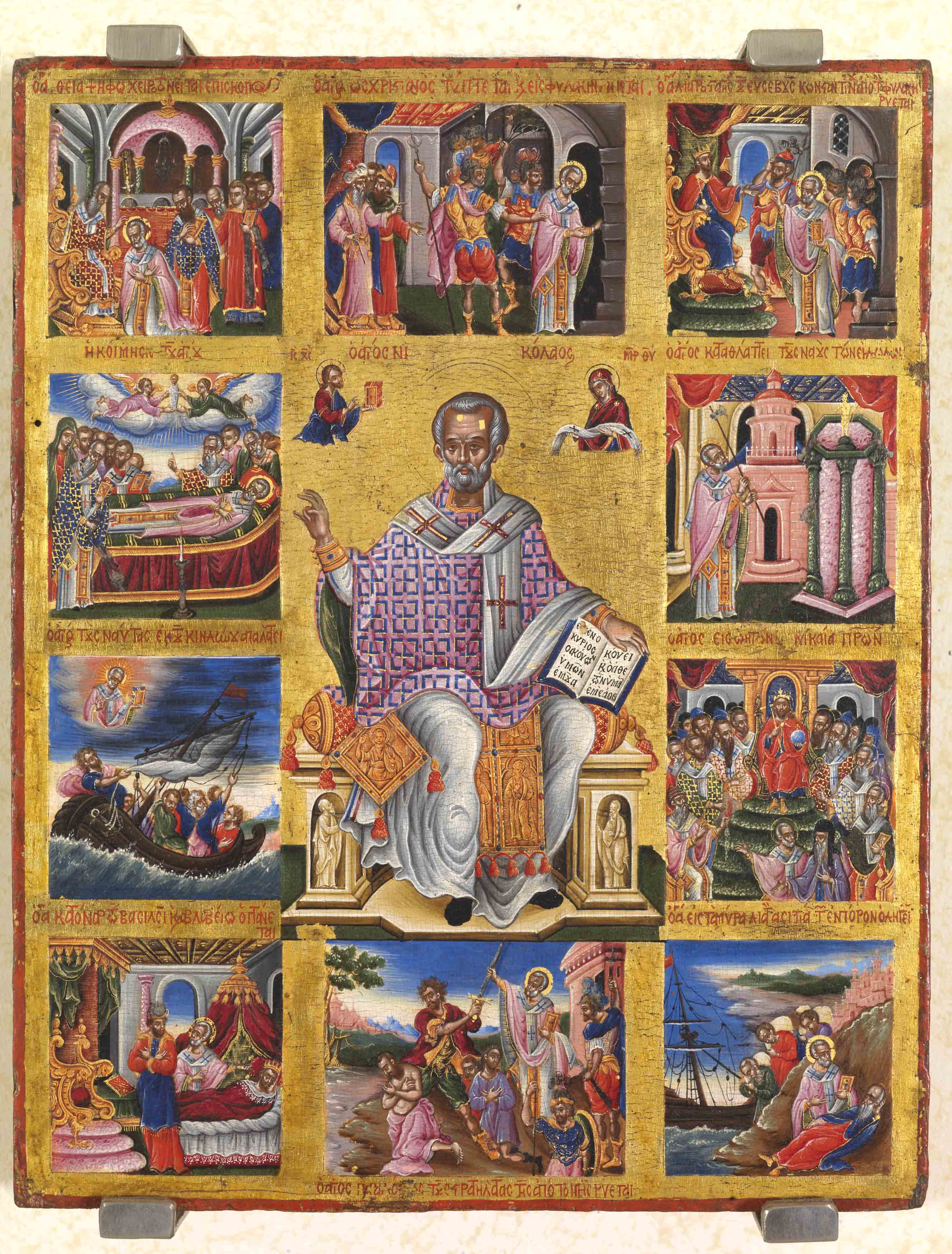
Icon of Saint Nicholas with scenes written by Theodore Poulakis (1650–1692)

The historicity of this incident is disputed. Adam C. English argues for a historical kernel in the legend, noting the story's early attestation and the fact that no similar stories were told about any other Christian saints. Jona Lendering, who also argues for the story's authenticity, notes that a similar story is told in Philostratus's Life of Apollonius of Tyana, in which Apollonius gives money to an impoverished father but posits that Michael the Archimandrite's account is markedly different. Philostratus does not mention the fate of the daughters and, in his story, Apollonius's generosity is purely motivated out of sympathy for the father; in Michael the Archimandrite's account, however, Saint Nicholas is instead expressly stated to be motivated by a desire to save the daughters from being sold into prostitution. He argues that this desire to help women is most characteristic of fourth-century Christianity, due to the prominent role women played in the early Christian movement, rather than Greco-Roman paganism or the Christianity of Michael the Archimandrite's time in the ninth century, by which point the position of women had drastically declined.

Nicholas is also said to have visited the Holy Land. The ship he was on was nearly destroyed by a terrible storm, but he rebuked the waves, causing the storm to subside. Thus, Nicholas became venerated as the patron saint of sailors and travelers.

While in Palestine, Nicholas is said to have lived in a crypt near Bethlehem, where the Nativity of Jesus is believed to have taken place. Over the crypt where Nicholas is believed to have lived now stands the "Church of Saint Nicholas" in Beit Jala, a Christian town of which Nicholas is the patron saint.

=== Bishop of Myra ===
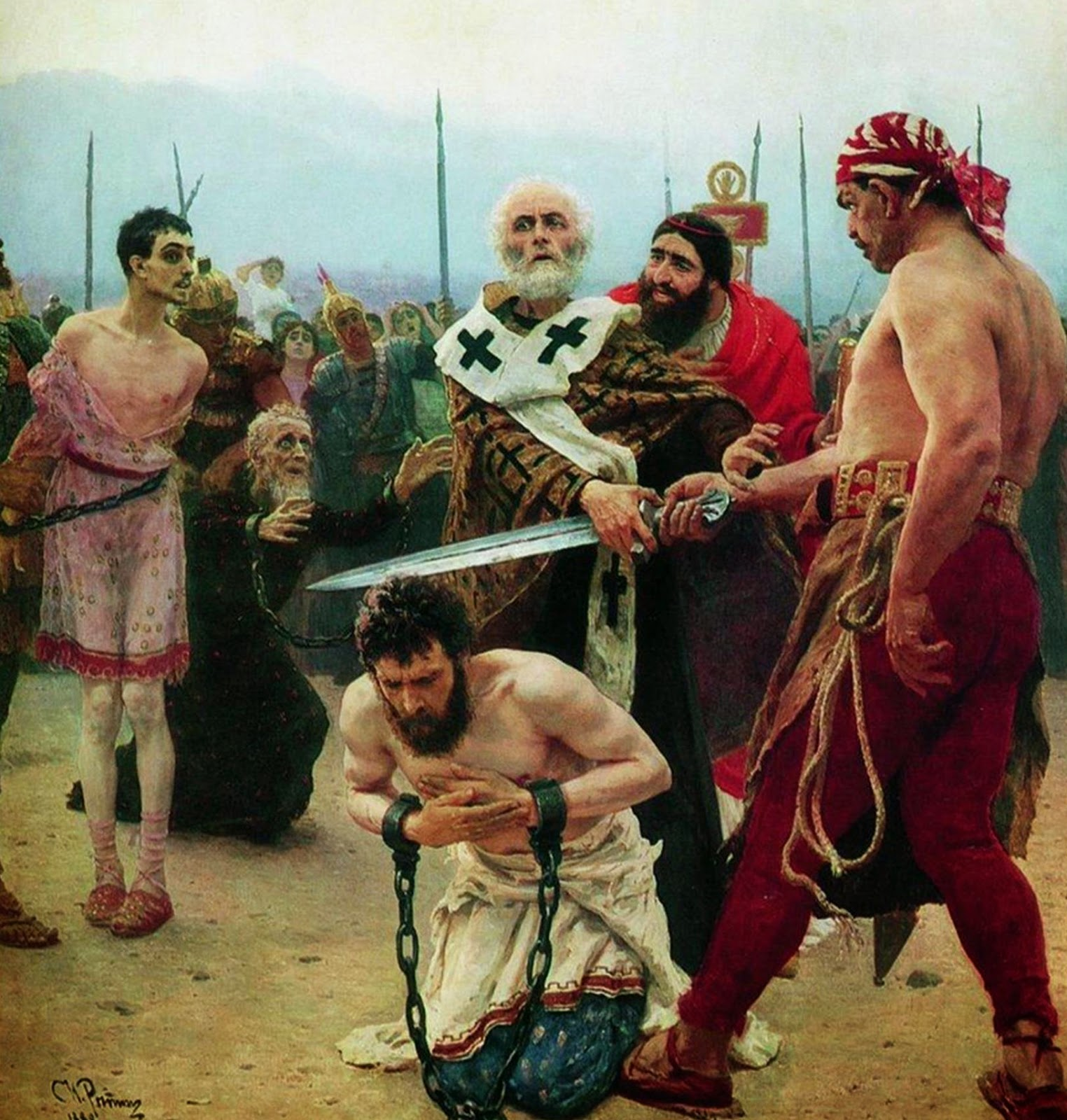
Saint Nicholas of Myra saves three innocents from death (1888) by Ilya Repin

After visiting the Holy Land, Nicholas returned to Myra. The bishop of Myra, who had succeeded Nicholas's uncle, had recently died and the priests in the city had decided that the first priest to enter the church that morning would be made bishop. Nicholas went to the church to pray and was therefore proclaimed the new bishop. He is said to have been imprisoned and tortured during the Great Persecution under the Emperor Diocletian (ruled 284–305), but was released under the orders of the Emperor Constantine the Great (ruled 306–337). This story sounds plausible, but is not attested in the earliest sources and is therefore unlikely to be historical.

One of the earliest attested stories of Saint Nicholas is one in which he saves three innocent men from execution. According to Michael the Archimandrite, three innocent men were condemned to death by the governor Eustathius. As they were about to be executed, Nicholas appeared, pushed the executioner's sword to the ground, released them from their chains, and angrily chastised a juror who had accepted a bribe. According to Jona Lendering, this story directly parallels an earlier story in Philostratus's Life of Apollonius of Tyana, in which Apollonius prevents the execution of a man falsely condemned of banditry. Michael the Archimandrite also tells another story in which the consul Ablabius accepted a bribe to put three famous generals to death, in spite of their actual innocence. Saint Nicholas appeared to Constantine and Ablabius in dreams, informing Constantine of the truth and frightening Ablabius into releasing the generals, for fear of Hell.

Later versions of the story are more elaborate, interweaving the two stories together. According to one version, Emperor Constantine sent three of his most trusted generals, named Ursos, Nepotianos, and Herpylion, to put down a rebellion in Phrygia. However, a storm forced them to take refuge in Myra. Unbeknownst to the generals, who were in the harbor, their soldiers further inland were fighting with local merchants and engaging in looting and destruction. Nicholas confronted the generals for allowing their soldiers to misbehave, and the generals brought an end to the looting. Immediately after the soldiers had returned to their ships, Nicholas heard word of the three innocent men about to be executed, and the three generals aided him in stopping the execution. Eustathius attempted to flee on his horse, but Nicholas stopped him and chastised him for his corruption. Eustathius, under the threat of being reported directly to the Emperor, repented of his corrupt ways. Afterward, the generals succeeded in ending the rebellion and were promoted by Constantine to even higher status. The generals' enemies, however, slandered them to the consul Ablabius, telling him that they had not really put down the revolt, but instead encouraged their own soldiers to join it. The generals' enemies also bribed Ablabius, and he had the three generals imprisoned. Nicholas then made his dream appearances, and the three generals were set free.

=== Council of Nicaea ===
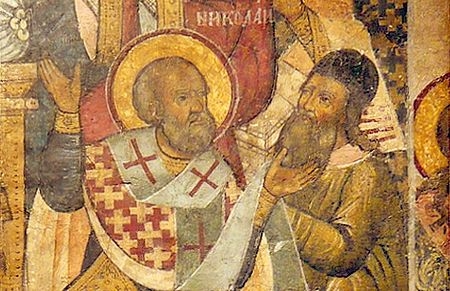
Detail of a late medieval Greek Orthodox fresco showing Saint Nicholas slapping Arius at the First Council of Nicaea

In 325, Nicholas is said to have attended the First Council of Nicaea, where he is said to have been a staunch opponent of Arianism and a devoted supporter of Trinitarianism, and one of the bishops who signed the Nicene Creed. Nicholas's attendance at the Council of Nicaea is attested early by Theodore the Lector's list of attendees, which records him as the 151st attendee. However, he is conspicuously never mentioned by Athanasius of Alexandria, the foremost defender of Trinitarianism at the council, who knew all the notable bishops of the period, nor is he mentioned by the historian Eusebius, who was also present at the council. Adam C. English notes that lists of attendees at Nicaea vary considerably: shorter lists include roughly 200 names, while longer lists include around 300. Saint Nicholas's name only appears on the longer lists, not the shorter ones. Nicholas's name appears on a total of three early lists, one of which, Theodore the Lector, is generally considered to be the most accurate. According to Jona Lendering, there are two main possibilities:

1. Nicholas did not attend the Council of Nicaea, but someone at an early date was baffled that his name was not listed and so added him to the list. Many scholars tend to favor this explanation.
2. Nicholas did attend the Council of Nicaea, but, at an early date, someone decided to remove his name from the list, apparently deciding that it was better if no one remembered he had been there.

A later legend, first attested in the fourteenth century, over 1,000 years after Nicholas's death, holds that, during the Council of Nicaea, Nicholas lost his temper and slapped "a certain Arian" across the face. On account of this, Constantine revoked Nicholas's miter and pallium. Steven D. Greydanus concludes that, because of the story's late attestation, it "has no historical value." Jona Lendering, however, defends the veracity and historicity of the incident, arguing that, as it was embarrassing and reflects poorly on Nicholas's reputation, it is inexplicable why later hagiographers would have invented it. Later versions of the legend embellish it, making the heretic Arius himself and having Nicholas punch him rather than merely slapping him with his open hand. In these versions of the story, Nicholas is also imprisoned, but Christ and the Virgin Mary appear to him in his cell. He tells them he is imprisoned "for loving you," and they free him from his chains and restore his vestments. The scene of Nicholas slapping Arius is celebrated in Eastern Orthodox icons and episodes of Saint Nicholas at Nicaea are shown in a series of paintings from the 1660s in the Basilica di San Nicola in Bari.

=== Other reputed miracles ===
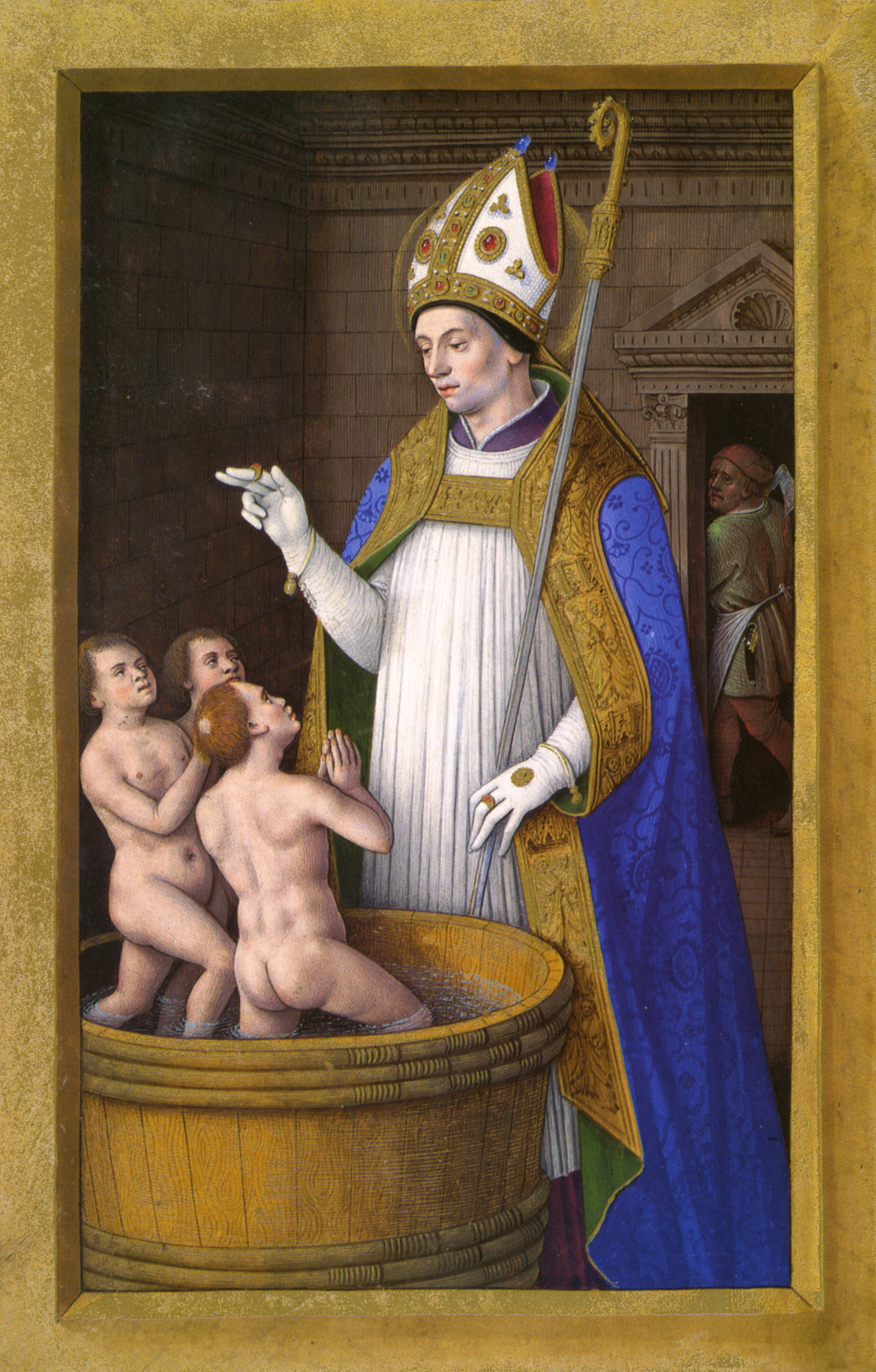
Illustration of Saint Nicholas resurrecting the three butchered children from the Grandes Heures d'Anne de Bretagne (created between 1503 and 1508)

One story tells how, during a terrible famine, a malicious butcher lured three little children into his house, where he killed them, placing their remains in a barrel to cure, planning to sell them off as ham. Nicholas, visiting the region to care for the hungry, saw through the butcher's lies and resurrected the pickled children by making the sign of the cross. Jona Lendering opines that the story is "without any historical value". Adam C. English notes that the story of the resurrection of the pickled children is a late medieval addition to the legendary biography of Saint Nicholas and that it is not found in any of his earliest Lives. Although this story seems bizarre and horrifying to modern audiences, it was tremendously popular throughout the Late Middle Ages and the early modern period, and widely beloved by ordinary folk. It is depicted in stained glass windows, wood panel paintings, tapestries, and frescoes. Eventually, the scene became so widely reproduced that, rather than showing the whole scene, artists began to merely depict Saint Nicholas with three naked children and a wooden barrel at his feet.

According to English, eventually, people who had forgotten or never learned the story began misinterpreting representations of it. That Saint Nicholas was shown with children led people to conclude he was the patron saint of children; meanwhile, the fact that he was shown with a barrel led people to conclude that he was the patron saint of brewers.

According to another story, during a great famine Myra experienced in 311–312, a ship was at anchor in the port, loaded with wheat for the emperor in Constantinople. Nicholas invited the sailors to unload a part of the wheat to help in times of need. The sailors at first disliked the request, because the wheat had to be weighed accurately and delivered to the emperor. Only when Nicholas promised them that they would not suffer any loss for their consideration did the sailors agree. When they arrived later in the capital, they made a surprising find: the weight of the load had not changed, although the wheat removed in Myra was enough for two full years and could even be used for sowing.

== Relics ==
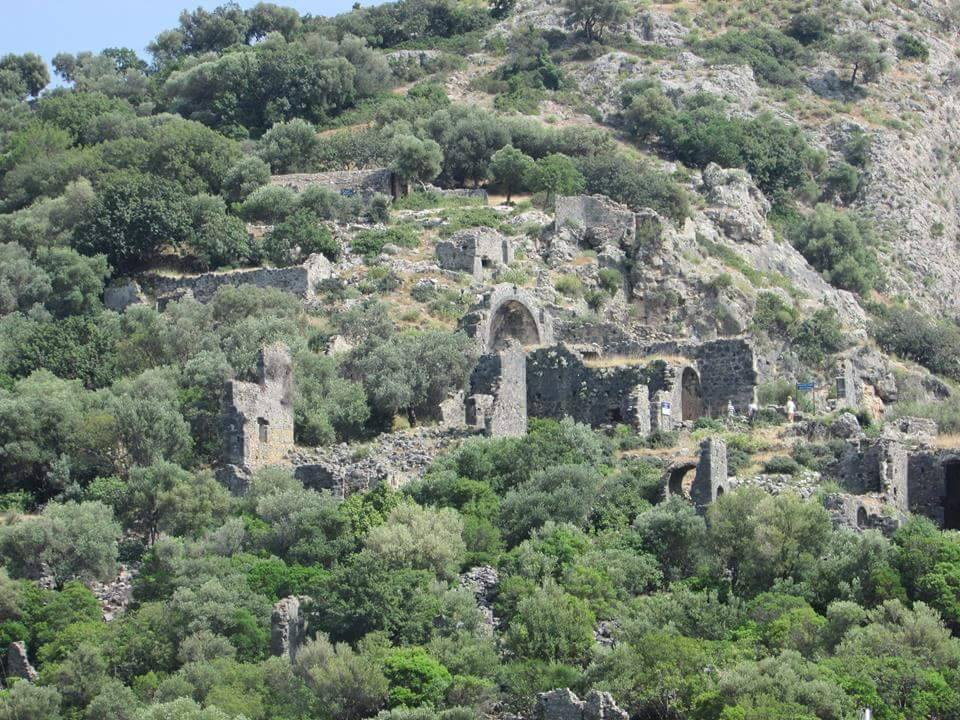
Ruins of the fourth-century church on the island of Gemile, where some scholars believe Saint Nicholas was originally entombed

=== Gemile ===
Tradition has long assumed that Saint Nicholas was originally buried in his hometown of Myra, where his relics are later known to have been kept, but some recent archaeological evidence indicates that Saint Nicholas may have originally been entombed in a rock-cut church located at the highest point on the small Turkish island of Gemile, only twenty miles away from his birthplace of Patara. Nicholas's name is painted on part of the ruined building. In antiquity, the island was known as "Saint Nicholas Island", and today it is known in Turkish as Gemiler Adasi, meaning "Island of Boats", in reference to Saint Nicholas's traditional role as the patron saint of seafarers.

The church was built in the fourth century, around the time of Nicholas's death, and is typical of saints' shrines from that time period. Nicholas was the only major saint associated with that part of Turkey. The church where historians believe he was originally entombed is at the western end of the great processional way.

=== Myra ===
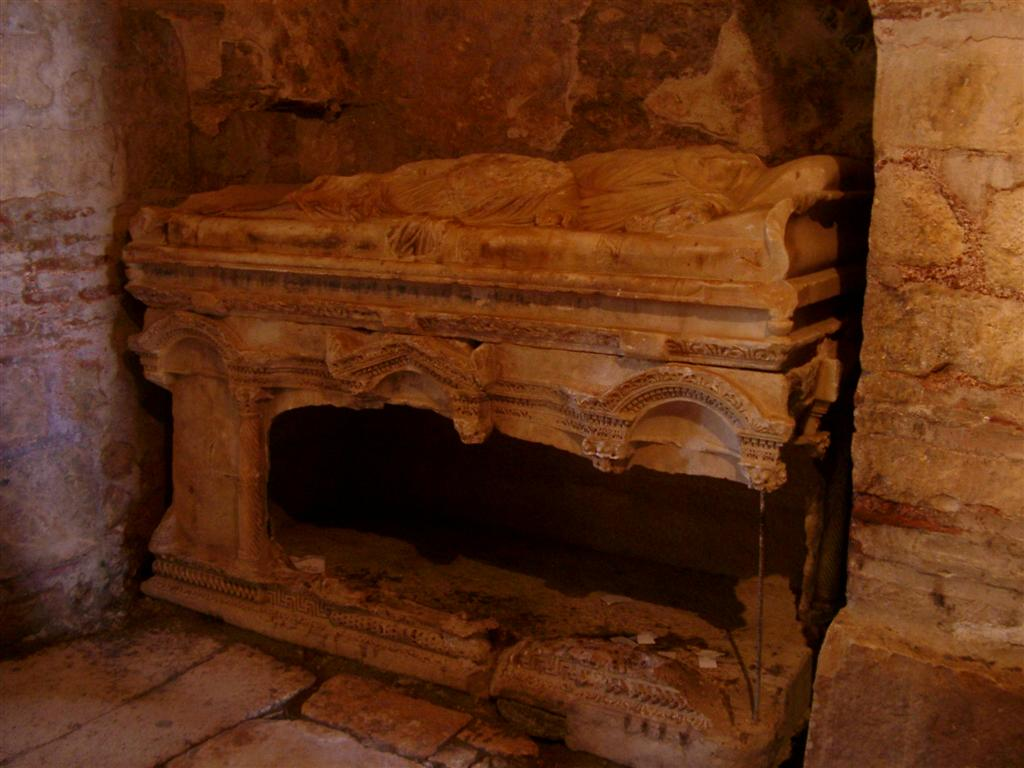
Desecrated sarcophagus in the St. Nicholas Church, Demre, where Saint Nicholas's bones were kept until 1087.

In the mid-7th century, Gemile was vulnerable to attack by Arab fleets. Hence, Nicholas's remains appear to have been moved from the island to the city of Myra, where Nicholas had served as bishop for most of his life. Myra is located roughly 40 km (25 mi) east of Gemile, and its location further inland made it safer from seafaring Arab forces.

It is said that, in Myra, the relics of Saint Nicholas each year exuded a clear watery liquid which smelled like rose water, called manna, or myrrh, which was believed by the faithful to possess miraculous powers. As it was widely known that all Nicholas's relics were at Myra in their sealed sarcophagus, it was rare during this period for forgers of relics to claim to possess those belonging to Saint Nicholas.

A solemn bronze statue of the saint by Russian sculptor Gregory Pototsky was donated by the Russian government in 2000 and given a prominent place in the square in front of the medieval Church of St Nicholas. In 2005, Mayor Süleyman Topçu had the statue replaced with a red-suited plastic Santa Claus because he wanted an image more recognisable to foreign visitors. Protests from the Russian government against this were successful, and the bronze statue was returned (albeit without its original high pedestal) to a corner nearer the church.

Basilica di San Nicola in Bari, Italy where most of the relics of Saint Nicholas are kept today

=== Bari ===
After the Battle of Manzikert in 1071, the Byzantine Empire temporarily lost control over most of Asia Minor to the invading Seljuk Turks, and so Christian Byzantine Greeks of Myra became subjects of the Turks. At the same time the Catholic Church in the West had declared (in 1054 AD) that the Greek church, the official church of the Byzantine Empire, was in schism. Because of the many wars in the region, some Christians were concerned that access to the tomb might become difficult.

Taking advantage of the confusion and the loss by the Greek Christian community of Myra of its Byzantine imperial protection, in the spring of 1087, Italian sailors from Bari in Apulia seized part of the remains of the saint from his burial church in Myra, over the objections of the Greek Orthodox monks in the church.

Adam C. English describes the removal of the relics from Myra as "essentially a holy robbery" and notes the thieves were not only afraid of being caught or chased after by the locals, but also the power of Saint Nicholas himself. Returning to Bari, they brought the remains with them and cared for them. The remains arrived on 9 May 1087. Two years later, Pope Urban II inaugurated a new church, the Basilica di San Nicola, to Saint Nicholas in Bari. The Pope himself personally placed Nicholas's relics into the tomb beneath the altar of the new church. The removal of Saint Nicholas's relics from Myra and their arrival in Bari is reliably recorded by multiple chroniclers, including Orderic Vitalis and 9 May continued to be celebrated every year by western Christians as the day of Nicholas's "translation". Eastern Orthodox Christians and the Turks have both long regarded the unauthorized removal of the relics from Myra as a blatant theft, but the people of Bari have instead maintained that it was a rescue mission to save the bones from the Turkish invaders. A legend, shown on the ceiling of the Basilica di San Nicola, holds that Nicholas once visited Bari and predicted that his bones would one day rest there.

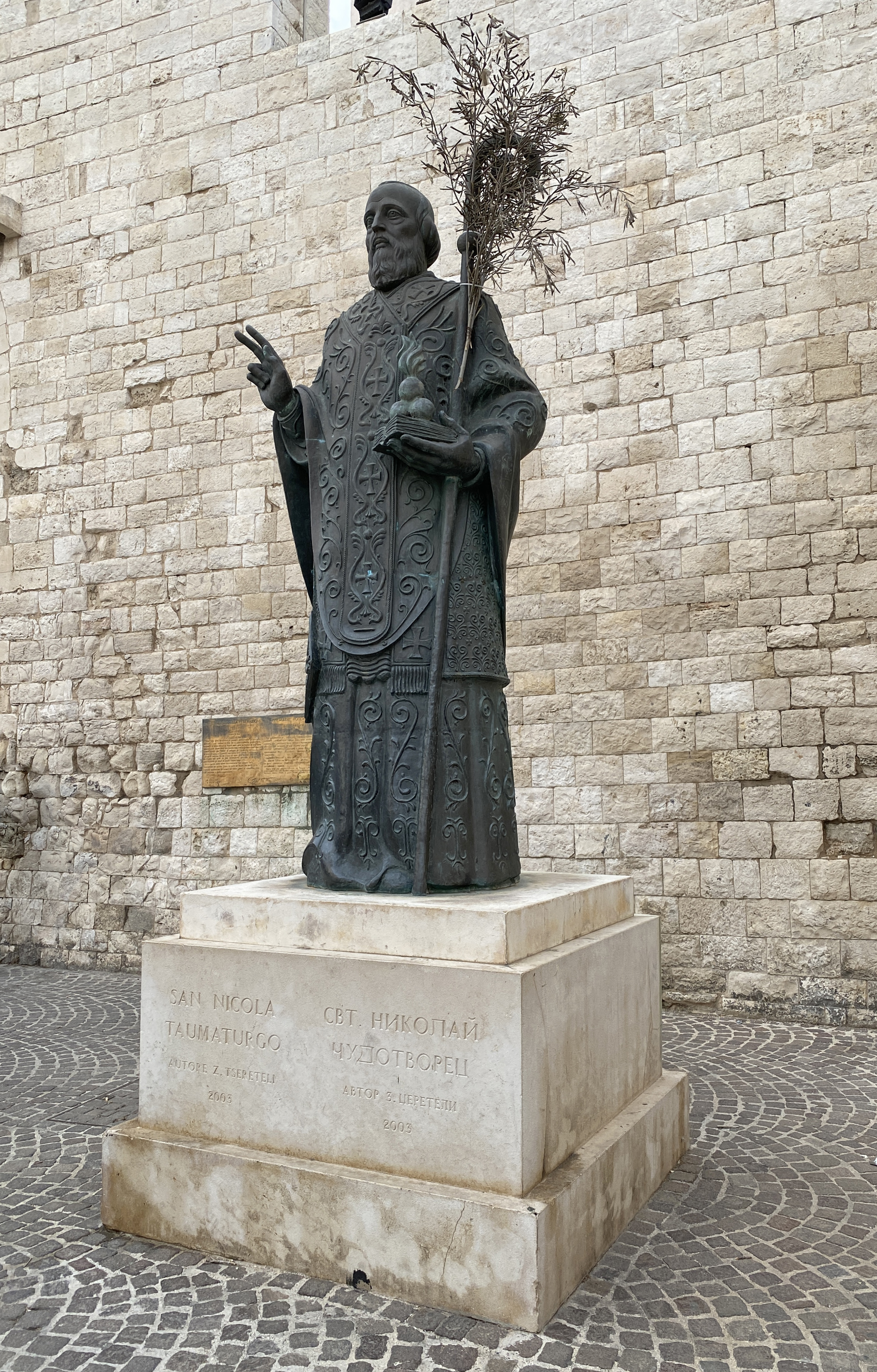
Statue of Nicholas in Bari.

Prior to the translation of Nicholas's relics to Bari, his following was known in western Europe but not particularly popular. In autumn of 1096, Norman and Frankish soldiers mustered in Bari in preparation for the First Crusade. Although the Crusaders generally favored warrior saints, which Saint Nicholas was not, the presence of his relics in Bari made him materially accessible to them. Nicholas's associations with aiding travelers and seafarers also made him a popular choice for veneration. Nicholas's veneration by Crusaders helped promote his following throughout western Europe.

After the relics were brought to Bari, they continued to produce "myrrh", much to the joy of their new owners. Vials of myrrh from his relics have been taken around the world for centuries and can still be obtained from his church in Bari. Even up to the present day, a flask of manna is extracted from the tomb of Saint Nicholas every year on 6 December (the Saint's feast day) by the clergy of the basilica. Myrrh is collected from a sarcophagus located in the basilica vault and can be obtained at the nearby shop. The liquid gradually seeps out of the tomb, but it is unclear whether it originates from the body within the tomb, or from the marble itself; since the town of Bari is a harbour, and the tomb is below sea level, there have been several natural explanations proposed for the manna fluid, including the transfer of seawater to the tomb by capillary action.

In 1966, a vault in the crypt underneath the Basilica di San Nicola was dedicated as an Orthodox chapel with an iconostasis in commemoration of the recent lifting of the anathemas the Roman Catholic and Eastern Orthodox Churches had issued against each other during the Great Schism in 1054.

In May 2017, following talks between Pope Francis and Russian Orthodox Patriarch Kirill, a portion of the relics of Saint Nicholas in Bari were sent on loan to Moscow. The relic was on display for veneration at Christ the Savior Cathedral before being taken to Saint Petersburg in mid-June before returning to Bari. More than a million people lined up in Moscow for a momentary glimpse of the gilded ark holding one of the saint's ribs.

=== Venice ===
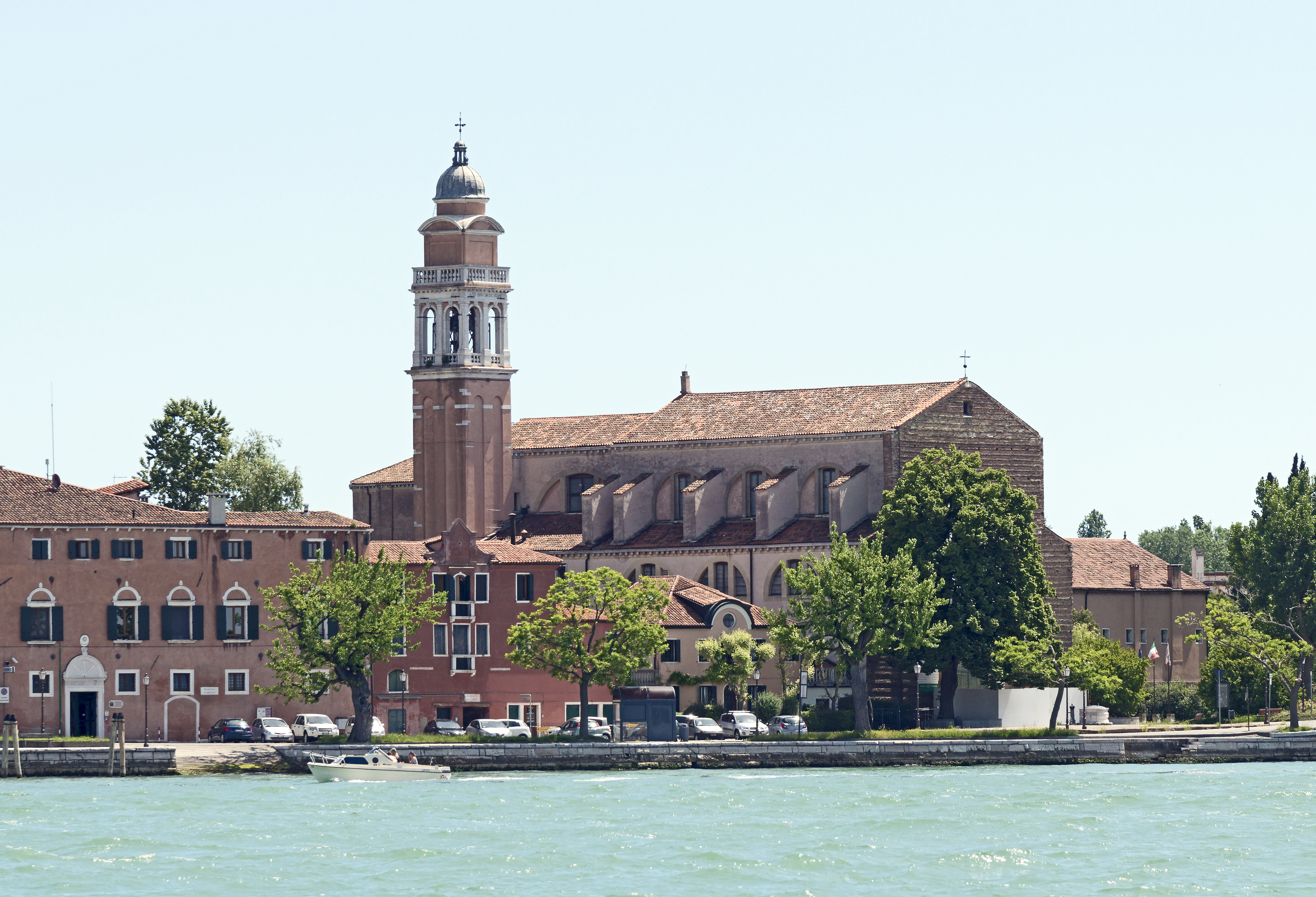
The church of San Nicolò al Lido in Venice, which claims to hold roughly 500 bone fragments from Nicholas's skeleton

The sailors from Bari took only the main bones of Nicholas's skeleton, leaving all the minor fragments in the grave. The city of Venice had an interest in obtaining the remaining fragments of his skeleton. In 1044, they dedicated the San Nicolò al Lido monastery basilica to him on the north end of the Lido di Venezia. According to a single chronicle written by an anonymous monk at this monastery, in 1100, a fleet of Venetian ships accompanied by Bishop Enrico Contarini sailed past Myra on their way to Palestine for the First Crusade. Bishop Enrico insisted that the fleet turn back and set anchor in Myra. The Venetians took the remaining bones of Saint Nicholas, as well as those of several other bishops of Myra, from the church there, which was only guarded by four Orthodox monks, and brought them to Venice, where they deposited them in the San Nicolò al Lido. This tradition was lent credence in two scientific investigations of the relics in Bari and Venice, which confirmed that the relics in the two cities are anatomically compatible and may belong to the same person. It is said that someone dies every time the bones of Saint Nicholas in Venice are disturbed. The last time the bones were examined was in July 1992.

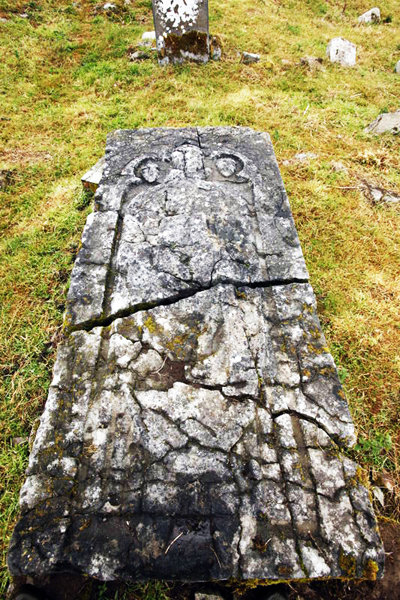
Tomb of Saint Nicholas near Thomastown, Ireland

=== Other locations ===
Because of Nicholas's skeleton's long confinement in Myra, after it was brought to Bari, demand for its pieces rose. Small bones quickly began to disperse across western Europe. The sailors who had transported the bones gave one tooth and two fragments chipped from Nicholas's sarcophagus to the Norman knight William Pantulf. Pantulf took these relics to his hometown of Noron in Normandy, where they were placed in the local Church of St. Peter in June 1092. In 1096, the duke of Apulia gave several bones of Saint Nicholas to the count of Flanders, which he then enshrined in the Abbey of Watten. According to legend, in 1101, Saint Nicholas appeared in a vision to a French clerk visiting the shrine at Bari and told him to take one of his bones with him to his hometown of Port, near Nancy. The clerk took a finger bone back with him to Port, where a chapel was built to Saint Nicholas. Port became an important center of devotion in the following of Nicholas and, in the fifteenth century, a church known as the Basilique Saint-Nicolas was built there and dedicated to him. The town itself is now known as "Saint Nicolas de Port" in honor of Nicholas.

The clergy at Bari strategically distributed samples of Nicholas's bones to promote the cult and enhance its prestige. Many of these bones were initially kept in Constantinople, but, after the Sack of Constantinople in 1204 during the Fourth Crusade, these fragments were scattered across western Europe. A hand claimed to be that of Saint Nicholas was kept at San Nicola in Carcere in Rome. This church, whose name means "Saint Nicholas in Chains", was built on the site of a former municipal prison. Stories quickly developed about Nicholas himself having been held in that prison. Mothers would come to the church to pray to Saint Nicholas for their jailed sons to be released, and repentant criminals would place votive offerings in the church. As a result of this, Nicholas became the patron saint of prisoners and those falsely accused of crimes. An index finger claimed to belong to Saint Nicholas was kept in a chapel along the Ostian Way in Rome. Another finger was held in Ventimiglia in Liguria. Today, many churches in Europe, Russia, and the United States claim to possess small relics, such as a tooth or a finger bone.

An Irish tradition states that the relics of Saint Nicholas are also reputed to have been stolen from Myra by local Norman crusading knights in the twelfth century and buried near Thomastown, County Kilkenny, where a stone slab marks the reputed "Tomb of Saint Nicholas". According to the Irish antiquarian John Hunt, the tomb probably actually belongs to a local priest from Jerpoint Abbey.

The Russian Orthodox Church announced on 22 September 2024 that Holy Myrrhbearers Cathedral in Baku received a part of Nicholas' relic as a gift.

=== Turkish repatriation request ===
On 28 December 2009, the Turkish government announced that it would be formally requesting the return of Saint Nicholas's skeletal remains to Turkey from the Italian government. Turkish authorities asserted that Nicholas himself desired to be buried at his episcopal town and that his remains were illegally removed from his homeland. In 2017, an archaeological survey at St. Nicholas Church in Demre reportedly uncovered a temple beneath the modern church, with further excavation planned to determine whether it contained the remains of Nicholas. A sarcophagus possibly containing his remains was found there in 2024.

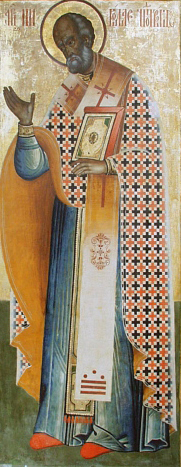
18th-century Russian icon at Kizhi monastery, Karelia

=== Scientific analysis ===
Whereas the devotional importance of relics and the economics of pilgrimages led to the division and dispersal of the remains of most saints across numerous churches in several countries, Saint Nicholas is unusual in that most of his bones have been preserved in one place: his grave crypt in Bari. Even with the allegedly continuing miracle of the manna, the archdiocese of Bari has allowed for one scientific survey of the bones. In the late 1950s, while the crypt was undergoing much-needed restoration, the bones were removed from it for the first time since their interment in 1089. A special Pontifical Commission permitted Luigi Martino, a professor of human anatomy at the University of Bari, to examine the bones under the commission's supervision. Martino took thousands of measurements, detailed scientific drawings, photographs, and X-rays. These examinations revealed the saint to have died at over seventy years of age and to have been of average height and slender-to-average build. He also suffered from severe chronic arthritis in his spine and pelvis.

In 2004, at the University of Manchester, researchers Caroline Wilkinson and Francesco Introna reconstructed the saint's face based on Martino's examination. The review of the data revealed that the historical Saint Nicholas was 5 ft 6 in (1.68 m) in height and had a broken nose, which had partially healed, revealing that the injury had occurred before his death. The broken nose appeared to conform with hagiographical reports that Saint Nicholas had been beaten and tortured during the Diocletianic Persecution. The facial reconstruction was produced by Caroline Wilkinson at the University of Manchester and was shown on a BBC2 TV program The Real Face of Santa. In 2014, the Face Lab at Liverpool John Moores University produced an updated reconstruction of Saint Nicholas's face.

In 2017, two researchers from Oxford University, Professor Tom Higham and Doctor Georges Kazan, radiocarbon dated a fragment of a pelvis claimed to belong to Saint Nicholas. The fragment originally came from a church in Lyon, France and, at the time of testing, was in the possession of Father Dennis O'Neill, a priest from St Martha of Bethany Church in Illinois. The results of the radiocarbon dating confirmed that the pelvis dates to the fourth century AD, around the same time that Saint Nicholas would have died, and is not a medieval forgery. The bone was one of the oldest the Oxford team had ever examined.

According to Professor Higham, most of the relics the team has examined are too recent to have actually belonged to the saint to whom they are attributed, but he states, "This bone fragment, in contrast, suggests that we could possibly be looking at remains from St Nicholas himself." Kazan believes the pelvis fragment may come from the same individual as the skeleton divided between the churches in Bari and Venice, since the bone they tested comes from the left pubis, and the only pelvis bone in the collection at Bari is the left ilium. In the absence of DNA testing, however, it is not yet possible to know for certain whether the pelvis is from the same man.

== Veneration and celebrations ==
Among Greeks and Italians, Saint Nicholas is a favorite of sailors, fishermen, ships and sailing. As a result, and over time, he has become the patron saint of several cities which maintain harbours. In centuries of Greek folklore, Nicholas was seen as "The Lord of the Sea", often described by modern Greek scholars as a kind of Christianized version of Poseidon. In modern Greece, he is still easily among the most recognizable saints and 6 December finds many cities celebrating their patron saint. He is also the patron saint of all of Greece and particularly of the Hellenic Navy.

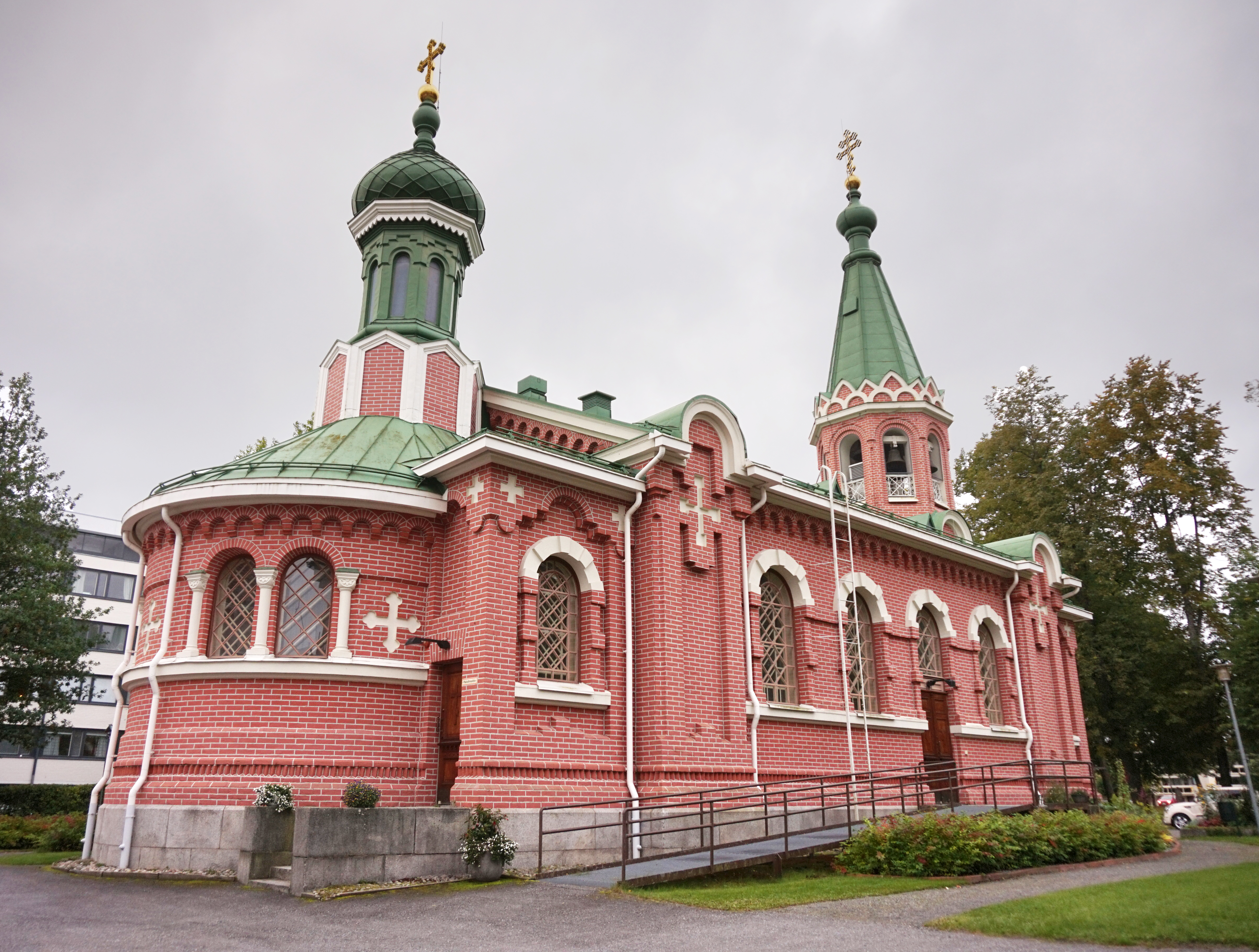
Eastern Orthodox Saint Nicholas Cathedral in Kuopio, Finland

In the Eastern Orthodox Church, Saint Nicholas's memory is celebrated on almost every Thursday of the year (together with the Apostles) with special hymns to him which are found in the liturgical book known as the Octoechos. Soon after the transfer of Saint Nicholas's relics from Myra to Bari, an East Slavic version of his Life and an account of the transfer of his relics were written by a contemporary to this event.

Devotional akathists and canons have been composed in his honour, and are frequently chanted by the faithful as they ask for his intercession. He is mentioned in the Liturgy of Preparation during the Divine Liturgy (Eastern Orthodox Eucharist) and during the All-Night Vigil. Many Orthodox churches will have his icon, even if they are not named after him. In Oriental Orthodoxy, the Coptic Church observes the Departure of St. Nicholas on 10 Kiahk, or 10 Taḫśaś in Ethiopia, which corresponds to the Julian Calendar's 6 December and Gregorian Calendar's 19 December.

Nicholas had a reputation for secret gift-giving, such as putting coins in the shoes of those who left them out for him, a practice celebrated on his feast day, 6 December. For those who still observe the Julian calendar the celebration currently takes place thirteen days later than it happens in the Gregorian calendar and Revised Julian calendar.

In Serbia, the most common Slava (annual ceremony and veneration of a Serbian family's patron saint) is Saint Nicholas' day celebrated on 19 December.

In Monaco, the Cathedral of Our Lady Immaculate was built from 1874 on the site of St Nicholas's church, founded in 1252. A children's Mass is still held on 6 December in the cathedral.

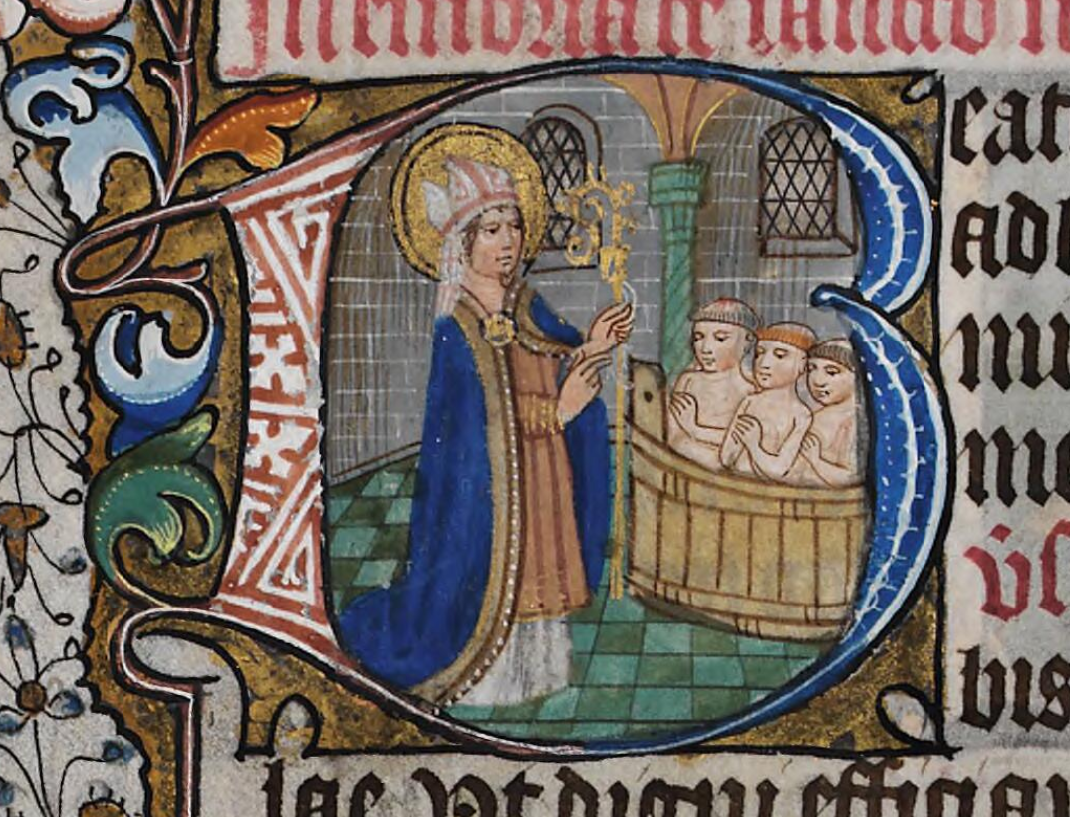
Saint Nicholas depicted in a 14th-century English book of hours

In late medieval England, on Saint Nicholas Day parishes held Christmastide "boy bishop" celebrations. As part of this celebration, youths performed the functions of priests and bishops, and exercised rule over their elders. Today, Saint Nicholas is still celebrated as a great gift-giver in several Western European and Central European countries. In medieval times, Christian nuns in Belgium and France began to deposit baskets of food and clothes anonymously at the doorsteps of the needy, which gave rise to the practice of gift giving on Saint Nicholas Day. According to another source, on 6 December every sailor or ex-sailor of the Low Countries (which at that time was virtually all of the male population) would descend to the harbour towns to participate in a church celebration for their patron saint. On the way back they would stop at one of the various Nicholas fairs to buy some hard-to-come-by goods, gifts for their loved ones and invariably some little presents for their children. While the real gifts would only be presented at Christmas, the little presents for the children were given right away, courtesy of Saint Nicholas. This and his miracle of him resurrecting the three butchered children made Saint Nicholas a patron saint of children and later students as well. The custom of giving gifts on Saint Nicholas Day is popular in various parts of Christendom, with a popular tradition including children placing their shoes in the foyer for Saint Nicholas to deliver presents therein.

Santa Claus evolved from Dutch traditions regarding Saint Nicholas (Sinterklaas). When the Dutch established the colony of New Amsterdam, they brought the legend and traditions of Sinterklaas with them. Howard G. Hageman, of New Brunswick Theological Seminary, maintains that the tradition of celebrating Sinterklaas in New York existed in the early settlements of the Hudson Valley, although by the early nineteenth century had fallen by the way. St. Nicholas Avenue and St. Nicholas Terrace, streets in the Harlem neighborhood of Manhattan, New York City, an area originally settled by Dutch farmers, were named for St. Nicholas of Myra. The name later was taken for nearby St. Nicholas Park, located at the intersection of St. Nicholas Avenue and 127th Street.

Nicholas is honored in the calendar of saints of the Lutheran Churches, as well as in Church of England and in the Episcopal Church on 6 December.

=== Eastern Orthodox feast days for Saint Nicholas of Myra in Lycia ===
- 9 May – Translation of the relics of Saint Nicholas the Wonderworker from Myra to Bari, in 1087.
- 10 May – Passage of the relics (sojourn) in 1087 of Saint Nicholas the Wonderworker through the island of Zakynthos, while on their way to Bari.
- 20 May – Arrival of the relics in Bari.
- 29 July – Nativity of Saint Nicholas the Wonderworker.
- Movable holiday on the Sunday between 16 and 22 August – Synaxis of All Saints of Lefkados.
- 22 September – Synaxis of All Saints of Tula (commemoration of the protection of Tula from the invasion of the Crimean Khan Devlet Giray in 1552).
- 6 December – Commemoration of his death.

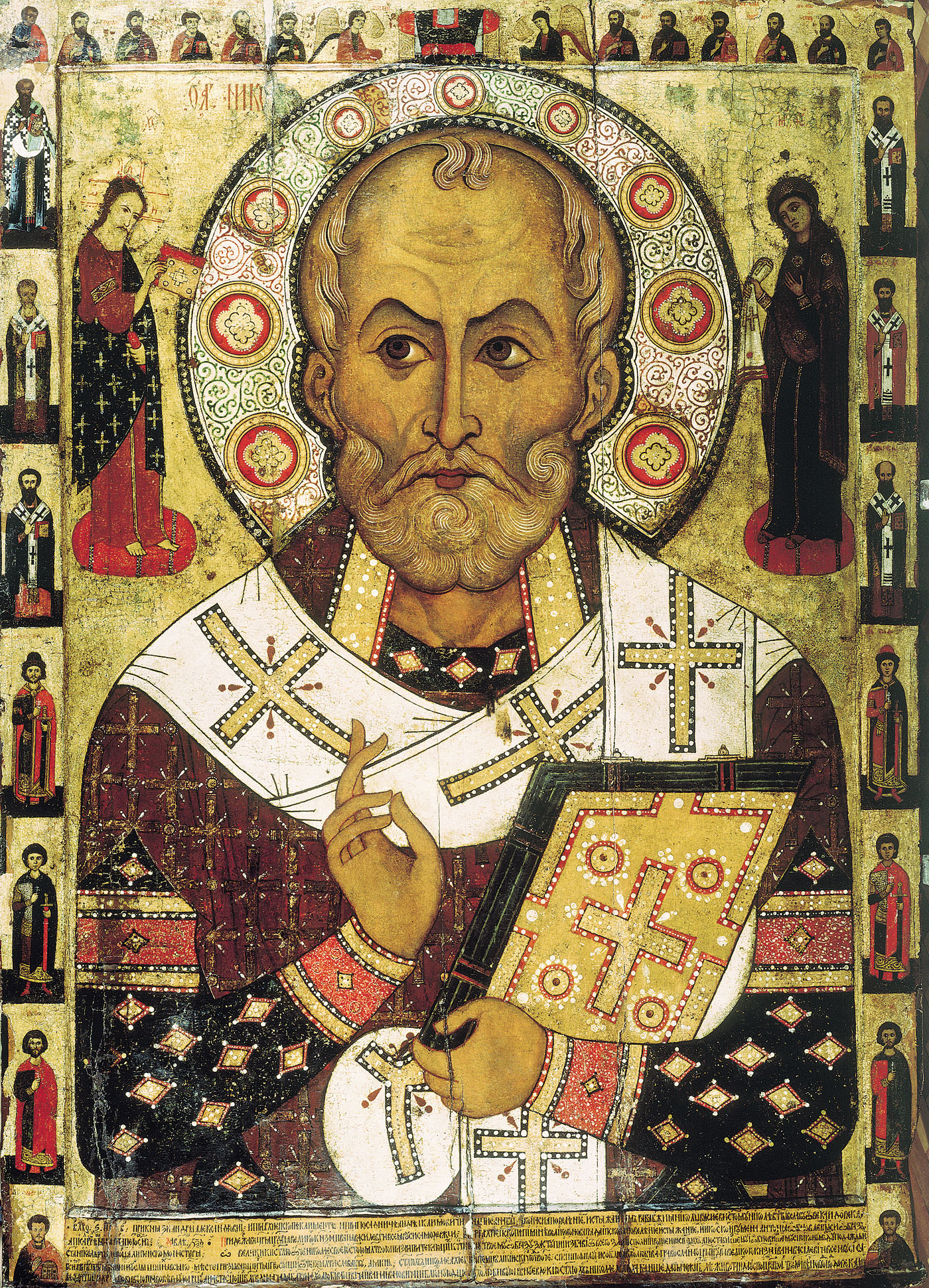
Large icon of Saint Nicholas painted in 1294 by Aleksa Petrov for the Lipno Church near Novgorod, Russia

== Iconography ==
Saint Nicholas is a popular subject portrayed on Eastern Orthodox icons, particularly Russian and Serbian ones. He is depicted as an Orthodox bishop, wearing the omophorion and holding a Gospel Book. Sometimes he is depicted wearing the Eastern Orthodox mitre, sometimes he is bareheaded. Iconographically, Nicholas is depicted as an elderly man with a short, full, white, fluffy beard and balding head. In commemoration of the miracle attributed to him by tradition at the Council of Nicaea, he is sometimes depicted with Christ over his left shoulder holding out a Gospel Book to him and the Theotokos over his right shoulder holding the omophorion. Because of his patronage of mariners, occasionally Saint Nicholas will be shown standing in a boat or rescuing drowning sailors; Medieval Chants and Polyphony, image on the cover of the Book of Hours of Duke of Berry, 1410.

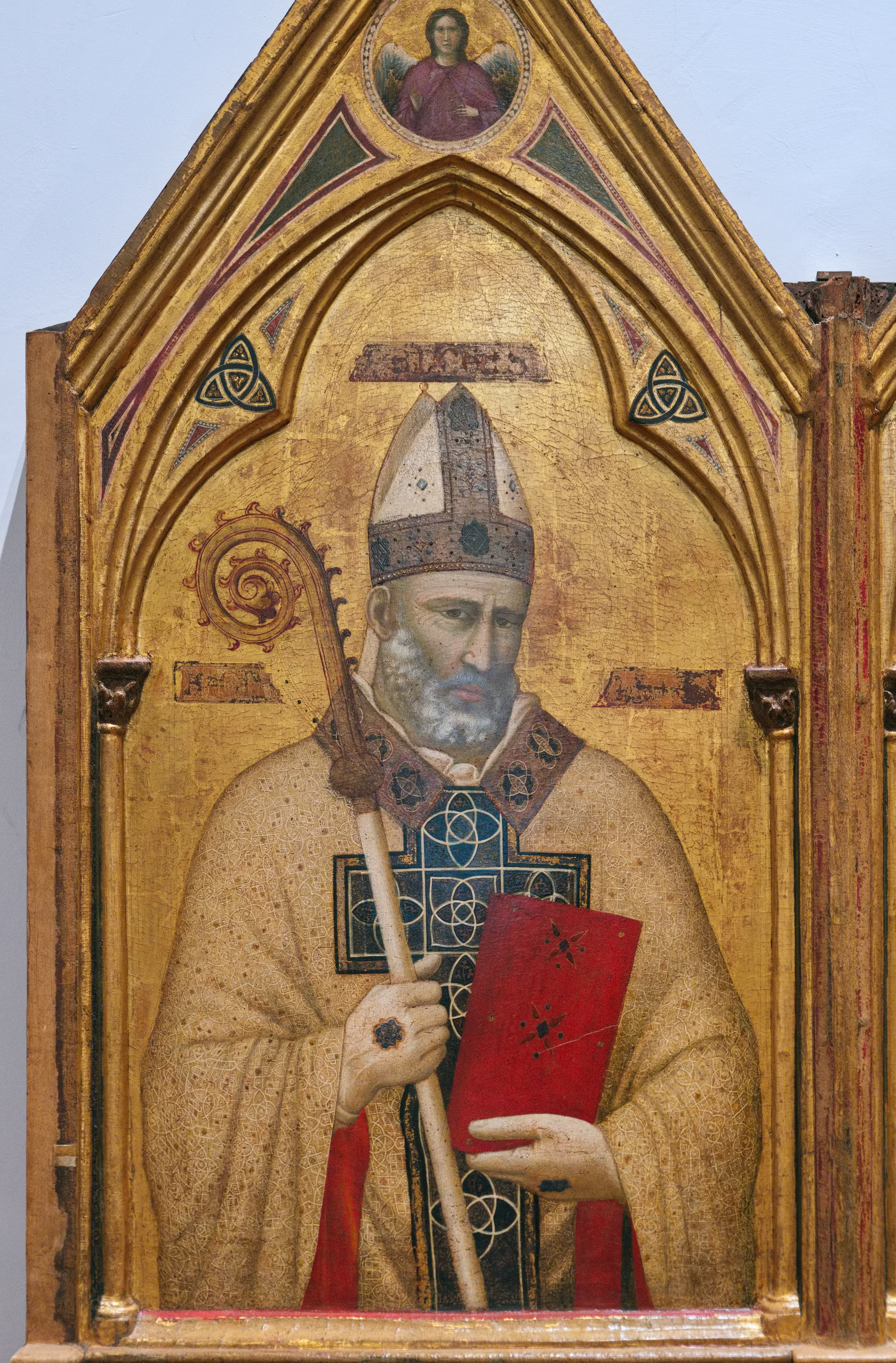
Giotto, Bishop Nicholas, panel of the Badia Polyptych, c. 1301, Uffizi, Florence

In depictions of Saint Nicholas from Bari, he is usually shown as dark-skinned, probably to emphasize his foreign origin. The emphasis on his foreignness may have been intended to enhance Bari's reputation by displaying that it had attracted the patronage of a saint from a far-off country. In Roman Catholic iconography, Saint Nicholas is depicted as a bishop, wearing the insignia of this dignity: a bishop's vestments, a mitre and a crozier. The episode with the three dowries is commemorated by showing him holding in his hand either three purses, three coins or three balls of gold. Depending on whether he is depicted as patron saint of children or sailors, his images will be completed by a background showing ships, children or three figures climbing out of a wooden barrel (the three slaughtered children he resurrected).

In a strange twist, the three gold balls referring to the dowry affair are sometimes metaphorically interpreted as being oranges or other fruits. As in the Low Countries in medieval times oranges most frequently came from Spain, this led to the belief that the saint lives in Spain and comes to visit every winter bringing them oranges, other 'wintry' fruits and tales of magical creatures.

== Music ==
In 1948, Benjamin Britten completed a cantata, Saint Nicolas on a text by Eric Crozier which covers the saint's legendary life in a dramatic sequence of events. A tenor soloist appears as Saint Nicolas, with a mixed choir, boys singers, strings, piano duet, organ and percussion.

== See also ==
- Saint Nicholas (European folklore)
- Companions of Saint Nicholas
- "A Visit from St. Nicholas", 1823 poem
- Saint Nicholas, patron saint archive
- Belsnickel – German Christmas gift-bringer
- St. Nicholas Church (disambiguation) – list of churches named after the saint

== Sources ==
- Blacker, Jean; Burgess, Glyn S.; Ogden, Amy V. (2013), "The Life of St Nicholas: Introduction", Wace: The Hagiographical Works: The Conception Nostre Dame and the Lives of St Margaret and St Nicholas, Leiden, The Netherlands and Boston, Massachusetts: Brill, ISBN 978-90-04-24768-0
- Coughlan, Sean (6 December 2017), "'Santa's bone' proved to be correct age", BBC News: Family & Education
- Cullen, Ellie (6 December 2017), "Bone fragment thought to belong to saint who inspired Father Christmas discovered in Italy: Academics have tested findings and say they belong to correct epoch", The Atlantic
- English, Adam C.; Crumm, David (2 December 2012), "Adam English digging back into the real St. Nicholas", ReadTheSpirit online magazine
- English, Adam C. (2016), Christmas: Theological Anticipations, Eugene, Oregon: Wipf & Stock Publishers, ISBN 978-1-4982-3933-2
- Ferguson, George (1976) [1954], "St. Nicholas of Myra or Bari", Signs and Symbols in Christian Art, Oxford, England: Oxford University Press, pp. 135–136
- Greydanus, Steven D. (6 December 2016), Let's Stop Celebrating St. Nicholas Punching Arius: One, he didn't do it. Two, it wouldn't be such a great thing if he had., National Catholic Register
- Hunt, John (1974), Irish Medieval Figure Sculpture, 1200–1600: A Study of Irish Tombs with Notes on Costume and Armour, Dublin, Ireland: Irish University Press, ISBN 085667012X
- Jones, Charles W. (1978), Saint Nikolaos of Myra, Bari, and Manhattan: Biography of a Legend, Chicago, Illinois: University of Chicago Press, ISBN 978-0-226-40700-5
- Keys, David (17 December 1993), "Santa's tomb is found off Turkey: Academics claim to have found where St Nicholas was buried. David Keys reports", The Independent
- Lendering, Jona (2006), "Nicholas of Myra", Livius.org
- Medrano, Kastalia (5 December 2017), "Santa is Dead—And the Bones of Old St Nicholas Are Buried in a Bunch of Different Churches", Newsweek: Tech & Science
- University of Oxford (5 December 2017), Could ancient bones suggest Santa was real?: New Oxford University research has revealed that bones long venerated as relics of the saint, do in fact date from the right historical period., University of Oxford
- Seal, Jeremy (2005), Nicholas: The Epic Journey from Saint to Santa Claus, New York City, New York and London, England: Bloomsbury, ISBN 978-1-58234-419-5
- Wheeler, Joe L. (2010), Saint Nicholas, Nashville, Tennessee: Thomas Nelson, ISBN 978-1-59555-115-3
- Wilkinson, Caroline (2018), "Archaeological Facial Depiction for People from the Past with Facial Differences", in Skinner, Patricia; Cock, Emily (eds.), Approaching Facial Difference: Past and Present, London, England: Bloomsbury Academic, ISBN 978-1-3500-2830-2
