= St. Nicholas Church, Demre =

Ancient East Roman basilica church

St. Nicholas Church
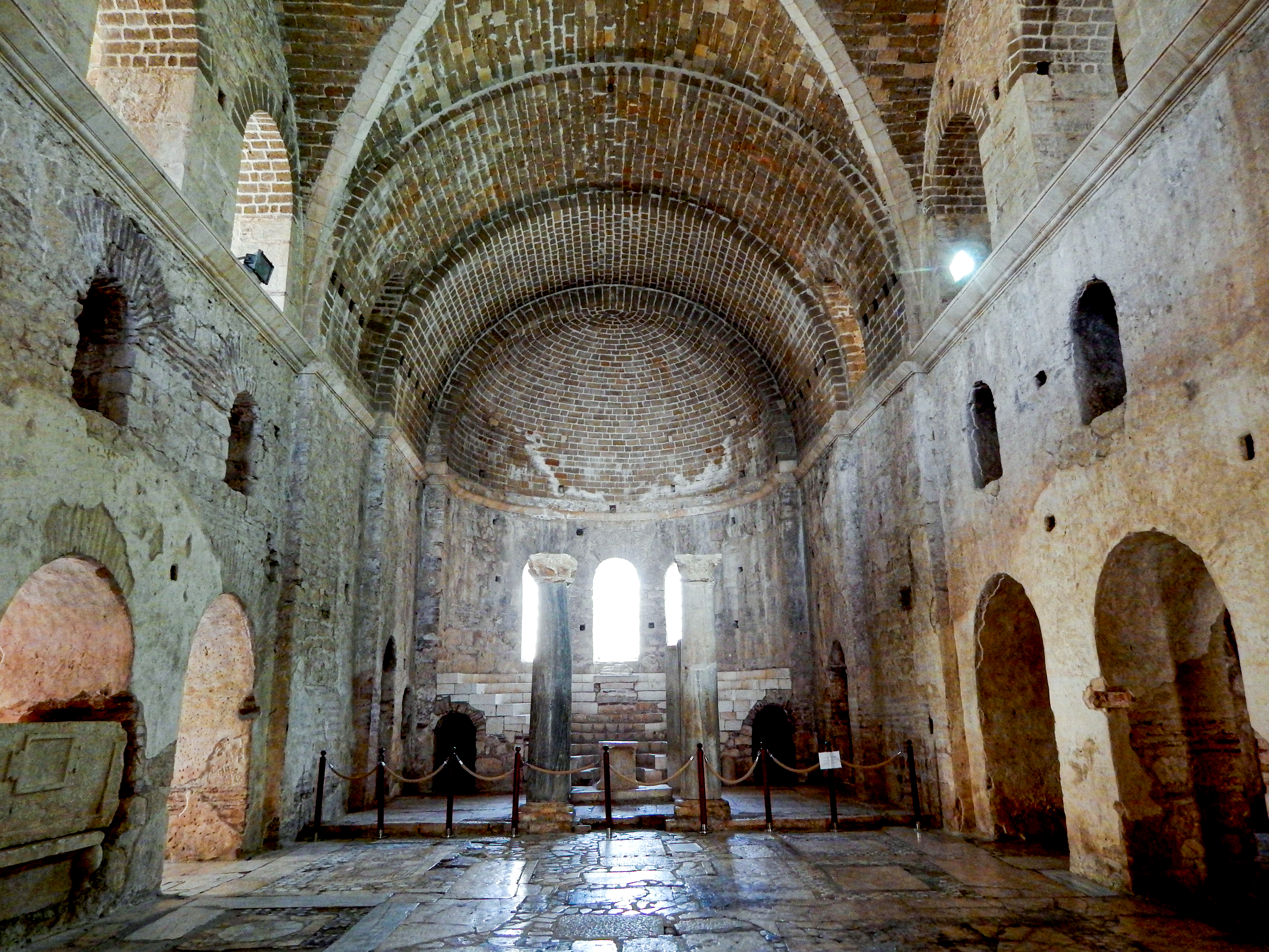
- St. Nicholas Church

- Location within Turkey

Religion
- Affiliation: Christianity
- Status: Museum

Location
- Location: Demre, Antalya Province, Turkey
- Coordinates: 36°14′41″N 29°59′08″E

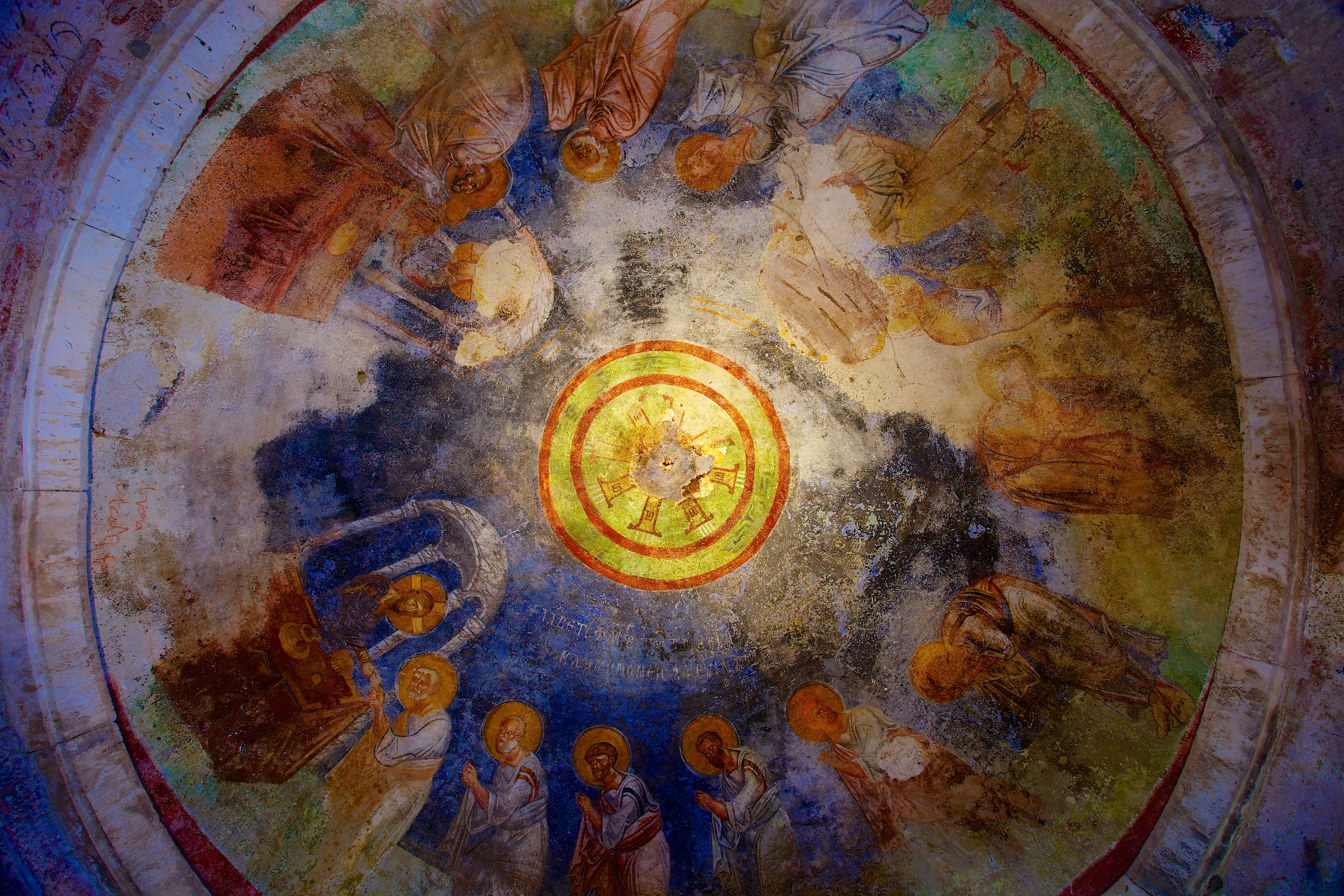
Ceiling fresco

St. Nicholas Church is an ancient East Roman basilica church in the ancient city of Myra located in modern Demre, Antalya Province, Turkey. It was built above the burial place of Saint Nicholas, a 4th-century Christian bishop of Myra, an important religious figure for Eastern Orthodox Christians and Roman Catholics and the historical inspiration for Santa Claus. Its use dated from its 6th century construction for the state church of the Roman Empire by Justinian the Great. The basilica is on UNESCO's tentative list to become a World Heritage Site.

== History ==
The church was built in AD 520 on the foundations of an older Christian church where Saint Nicholas had served as a bishop. Justinian I contributed to the reconstruction. It is noted for its remarkable wall frescos, and its architectural and religious significance.

Over time the church was flooded and filled with silt. In 1862 it was restored by Emperor Nicholas I of Russia, who added a tower and made other changes to its Byzantine architecture. The church continued to function until its final abandonment by the Eastern Orthodox Church in 1923, when the remaining Ottoman Greeks of Demre were required to leave by the population exchange between Greece and Turkey.

== Archaeological excavations ==
Archaeological excavations in the church started in 1988, directed by S. Yıldız Ötüken of Hacettepe University in Ankara, Turkey. The work revealed some of the northern section of the monastery complex, and also the small chapels around the nave, one of which notably contains vibrant frescoes detailing the life and miracles of the saint, and a desecrated sarcophagus which is thought to be the original burial place from which his remains were forcibly translated to Bari in 1087.

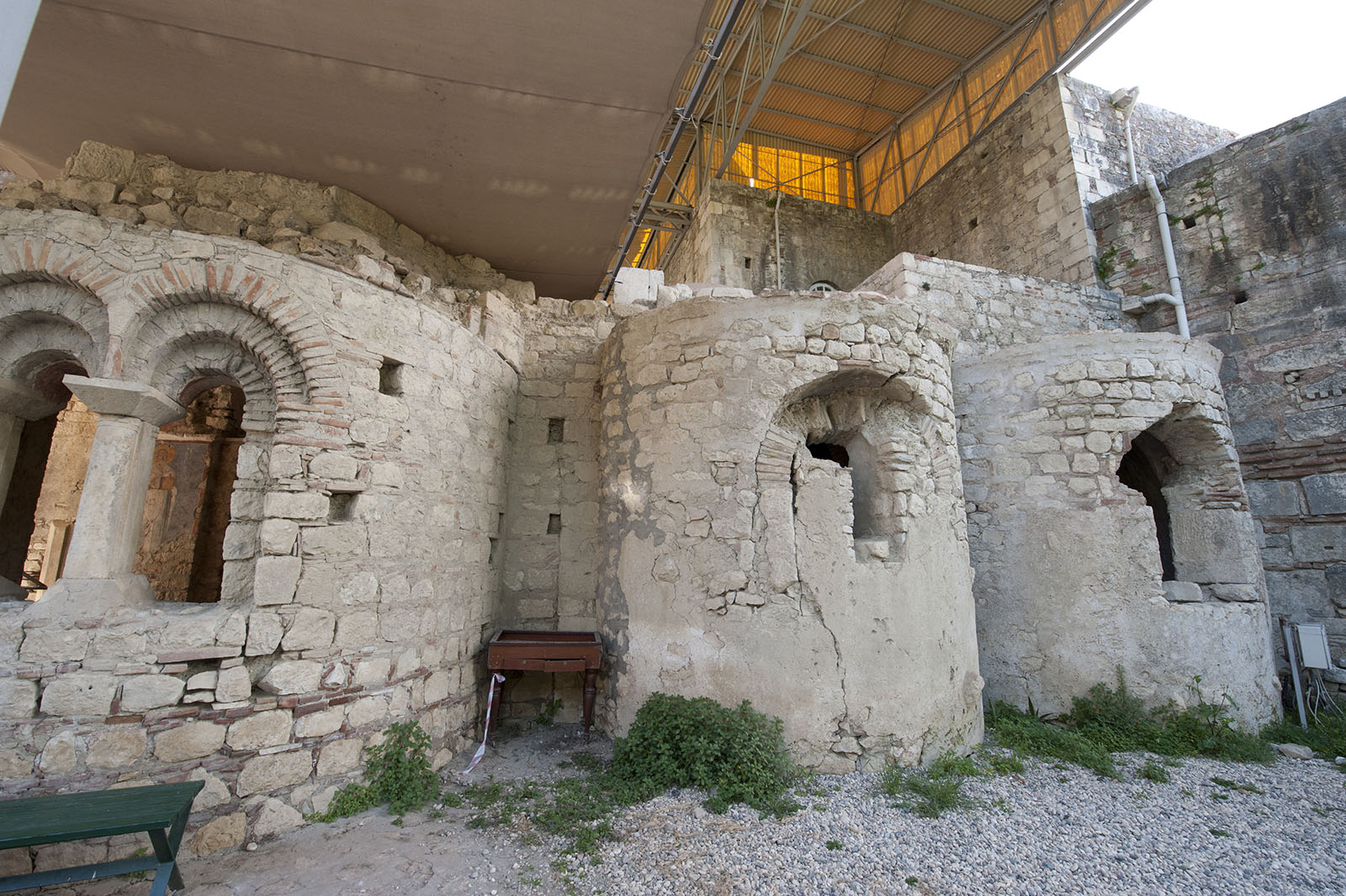
St. Nicholas Church Exterior

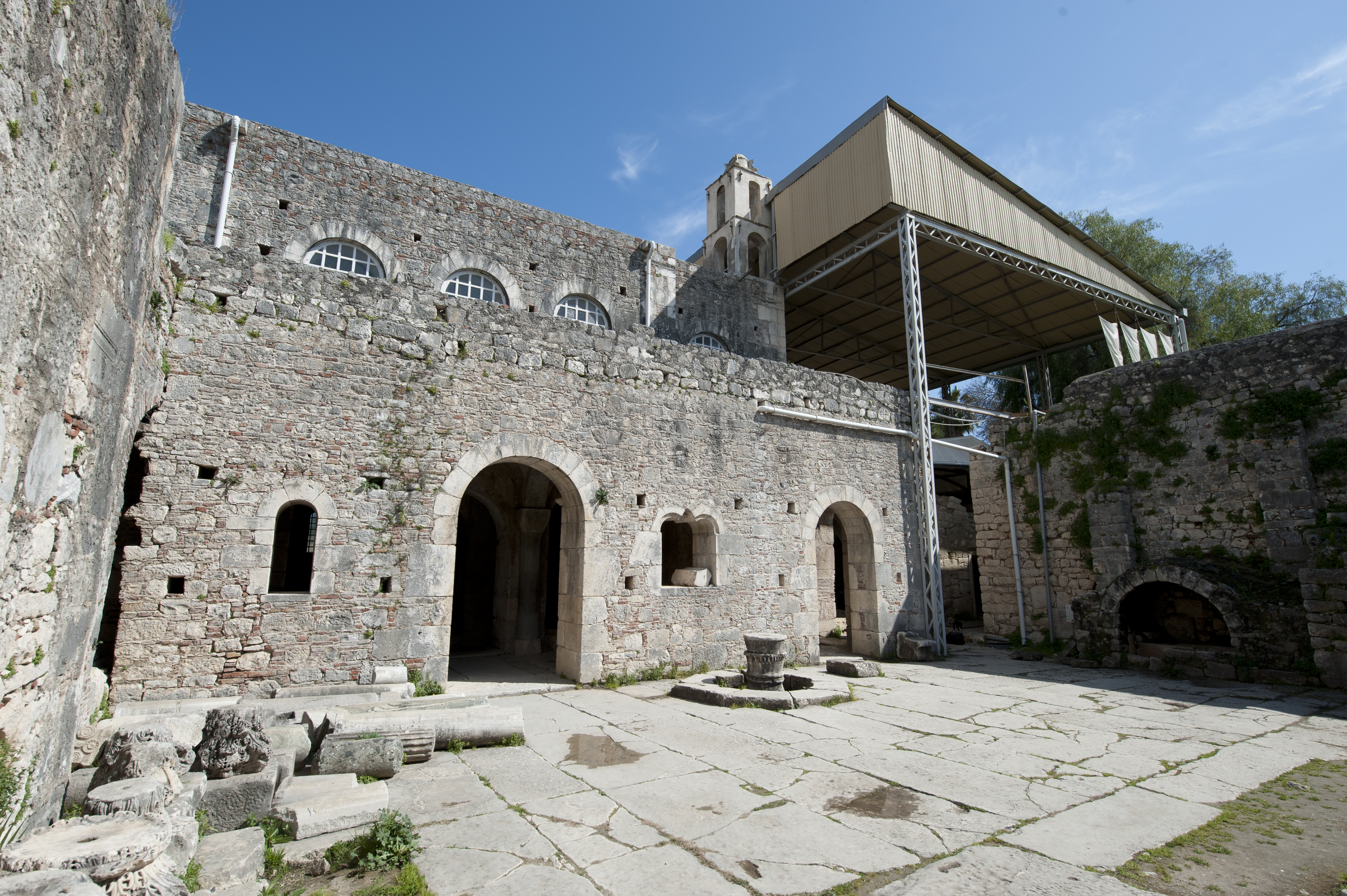
St. Nicholas Church from courtyard

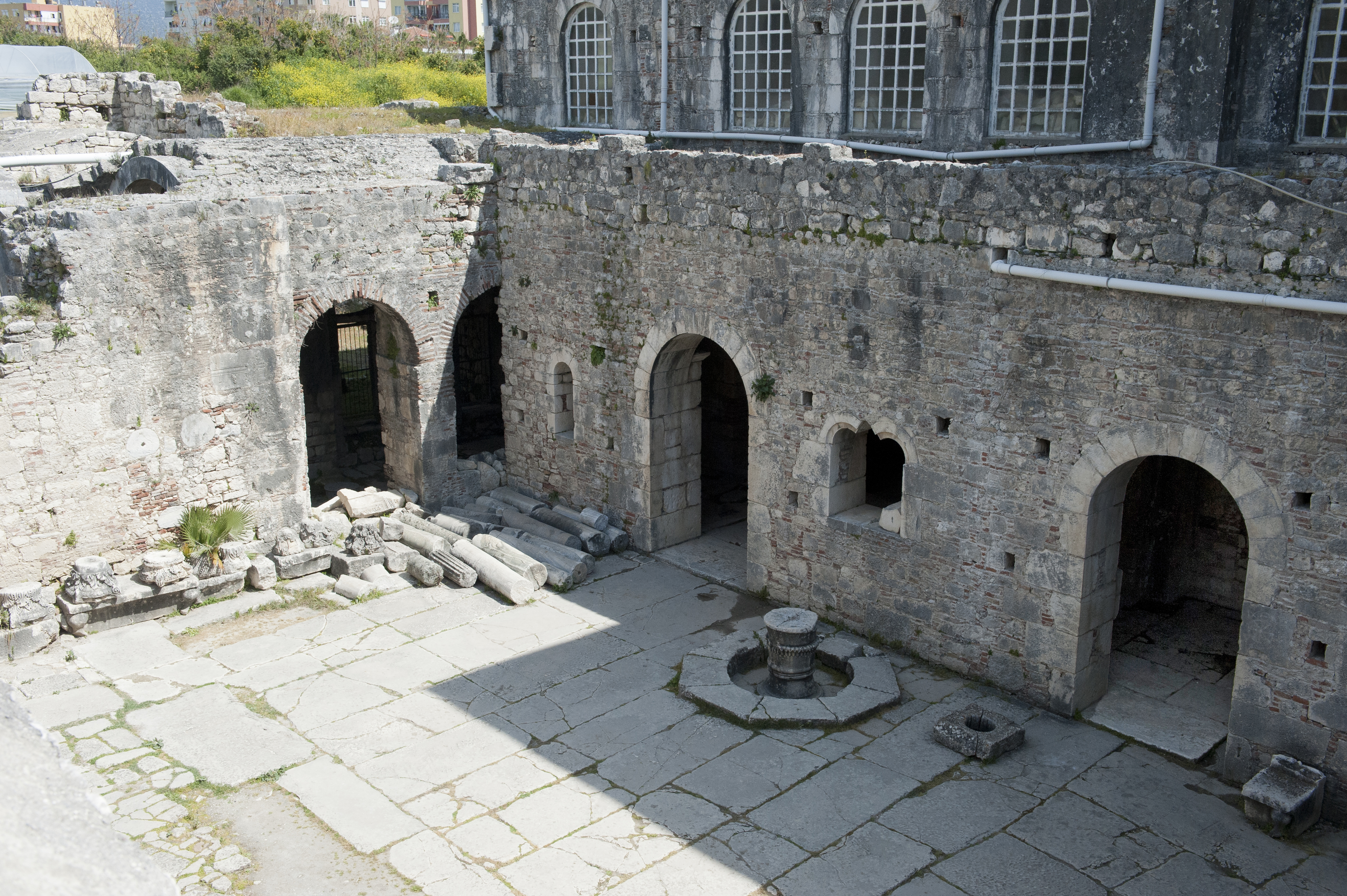
St. Nicholas Church courtyard from high

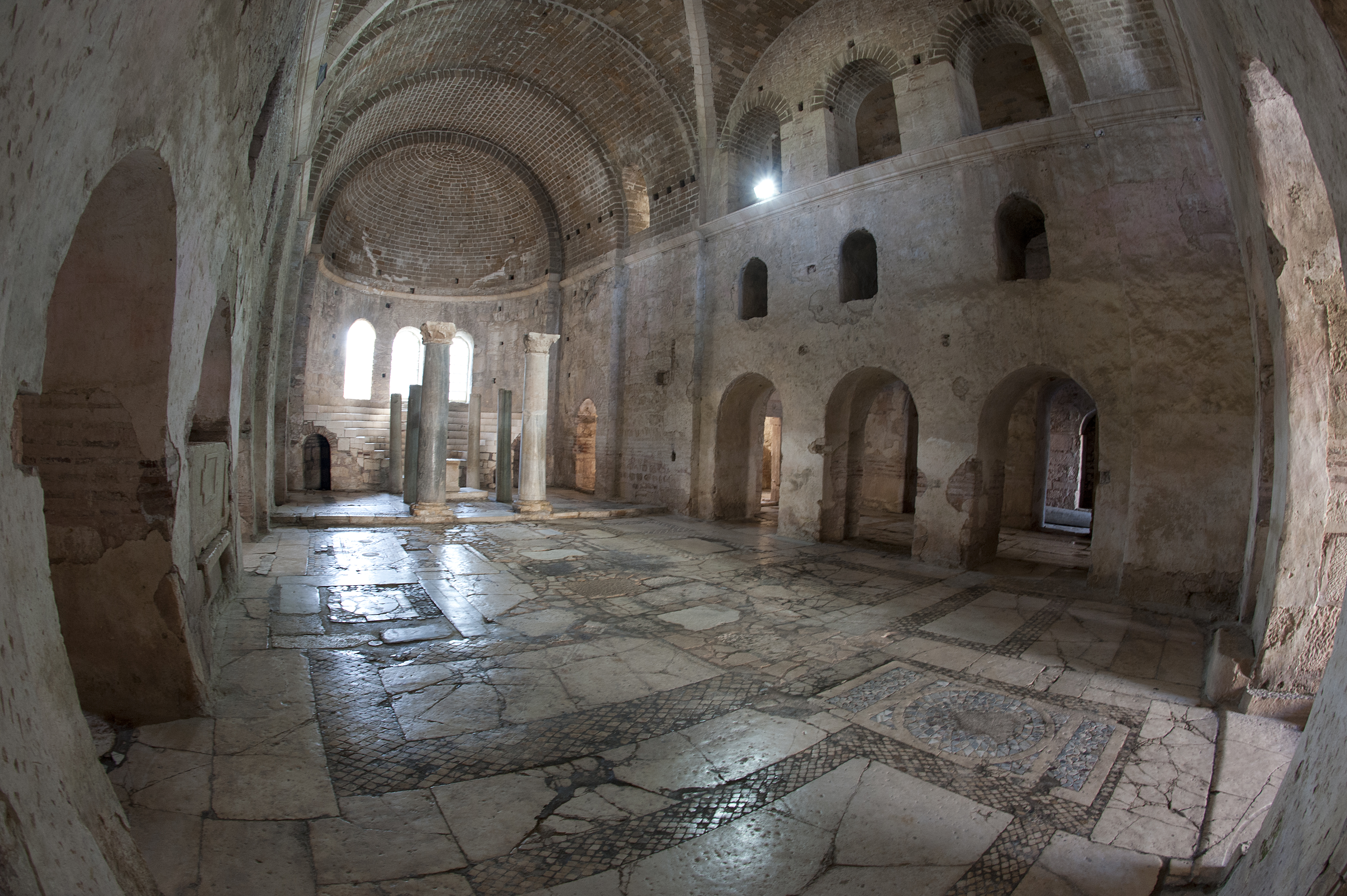
St. Nicholas Church View to choir

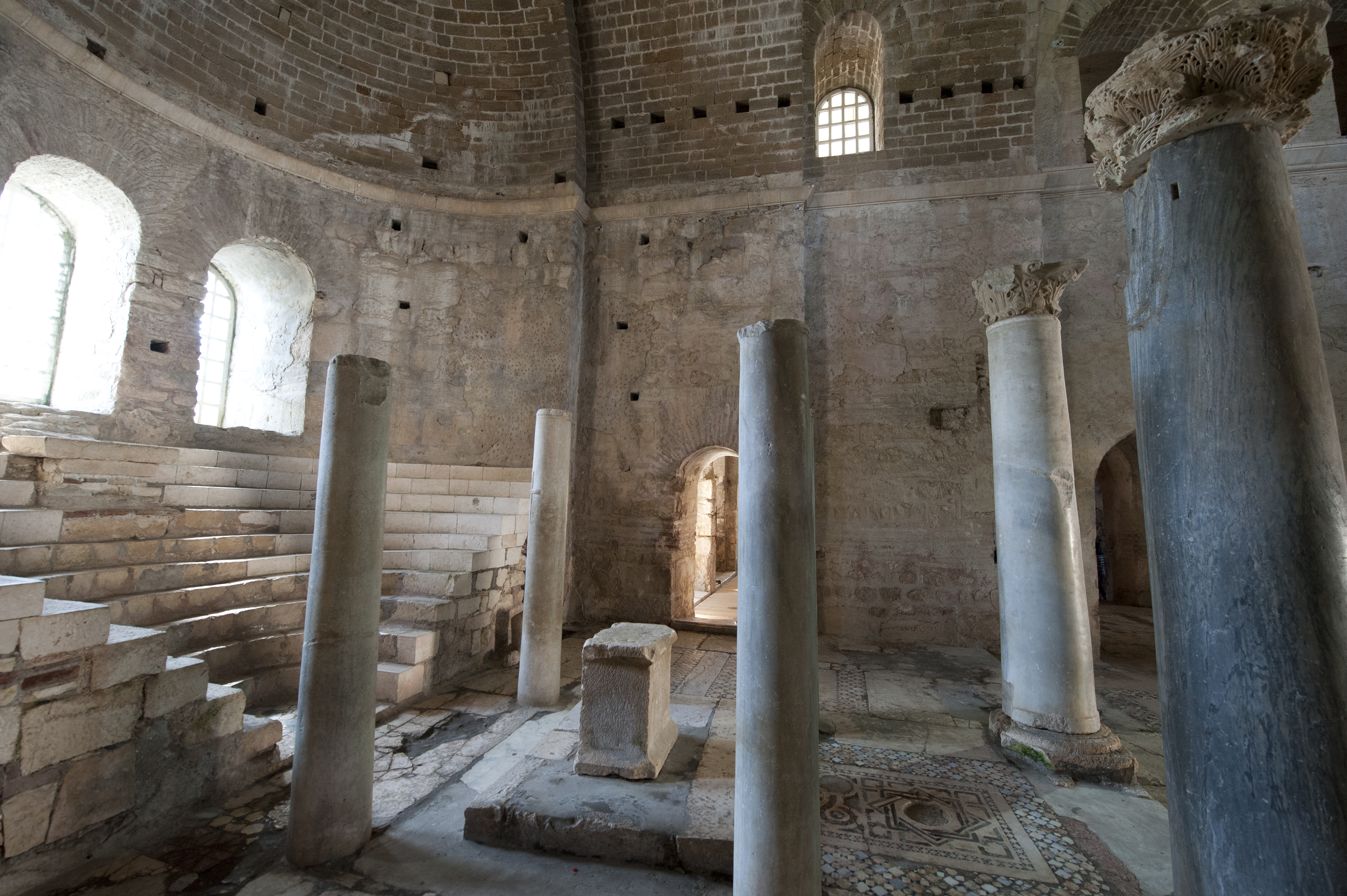
St. Nicholas Church at choir

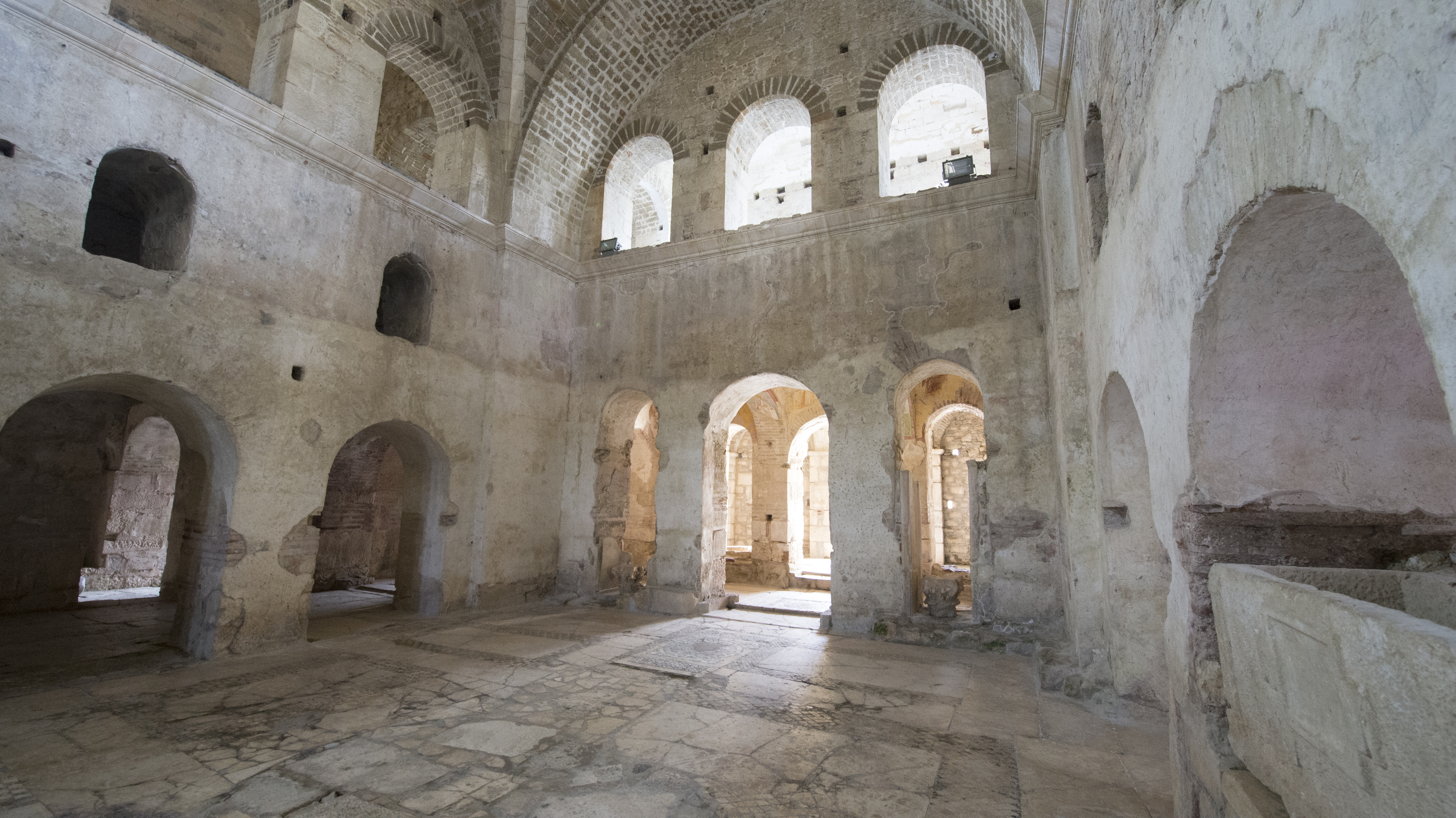
St. Nicholas Church view from choir

== Decoration ==
The northeast annex arcade contains the only example of Nicholas's life cycle on ancient frescos in Turkey.

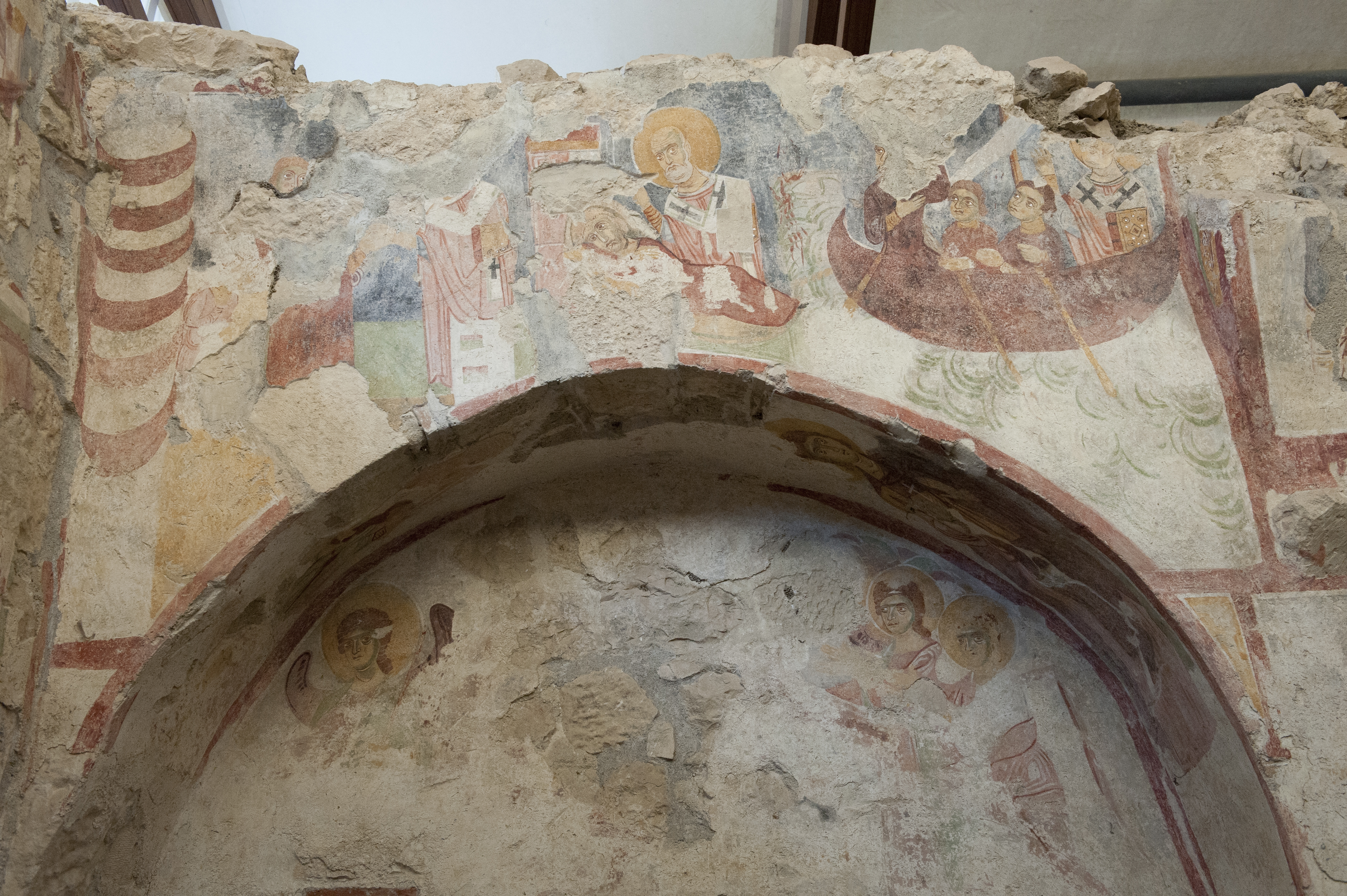
St. Nicholas Church Fresco

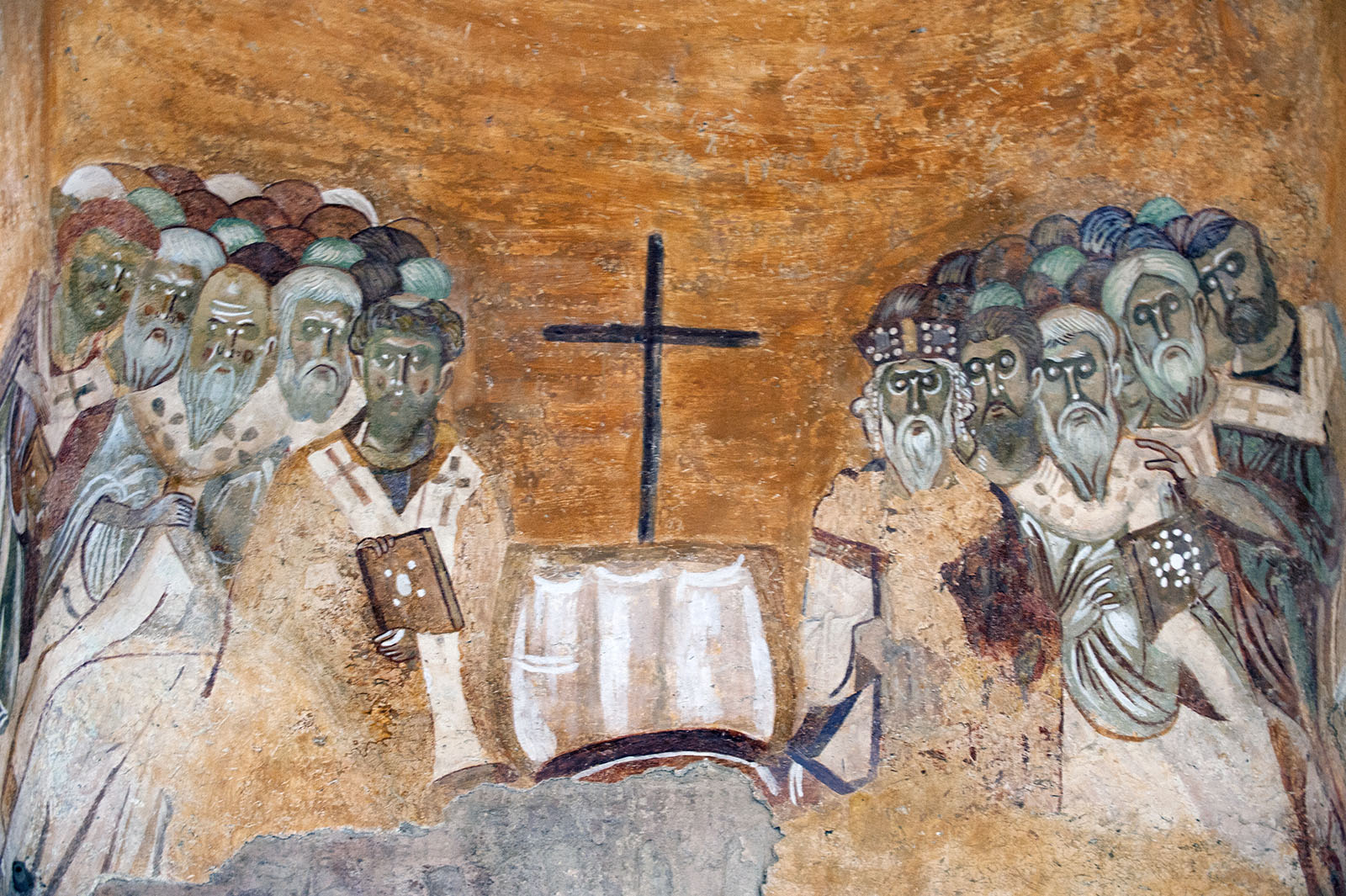
St. Nicholas Church Fresco

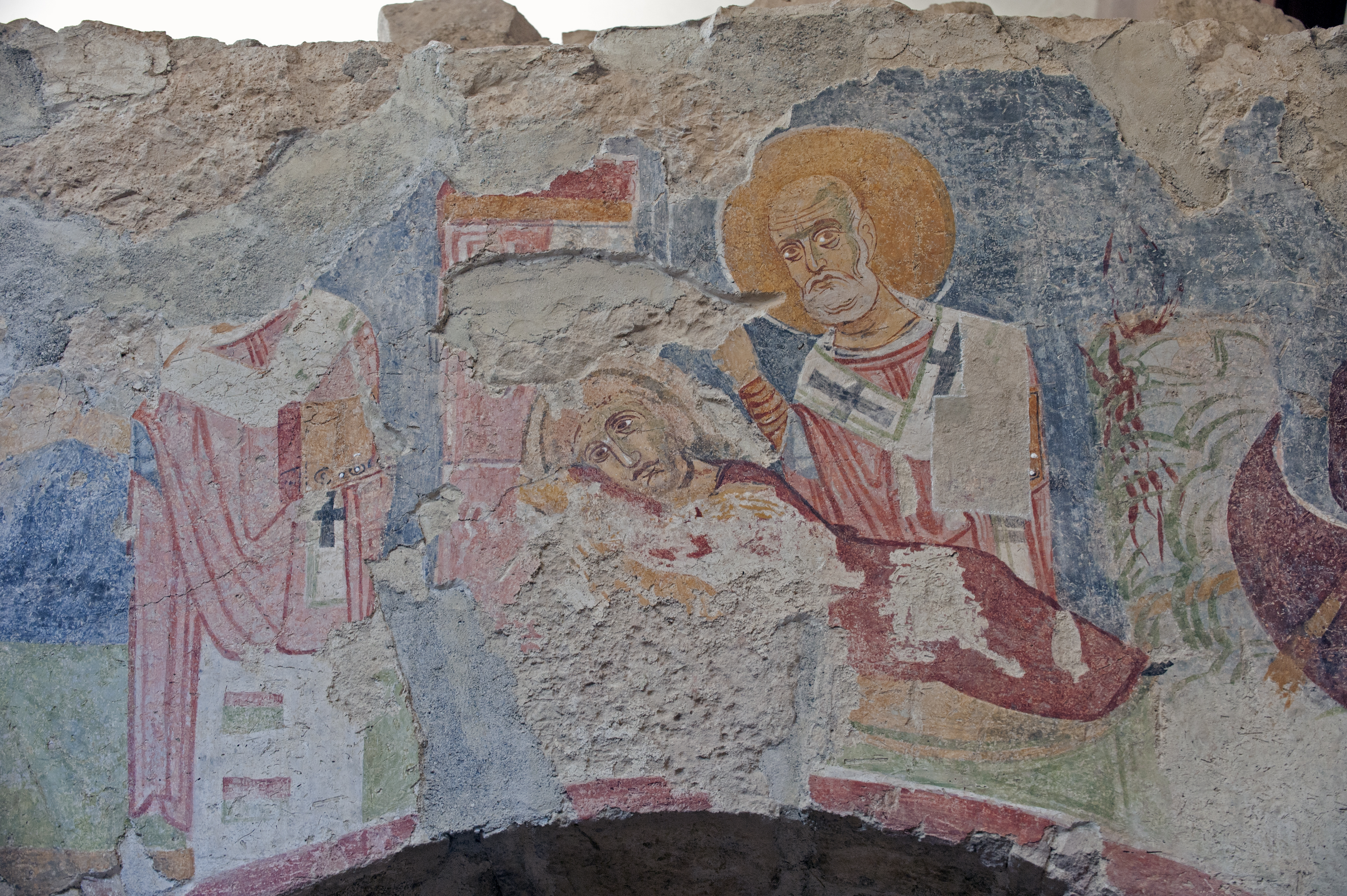
St. Nicholas Church Fresco

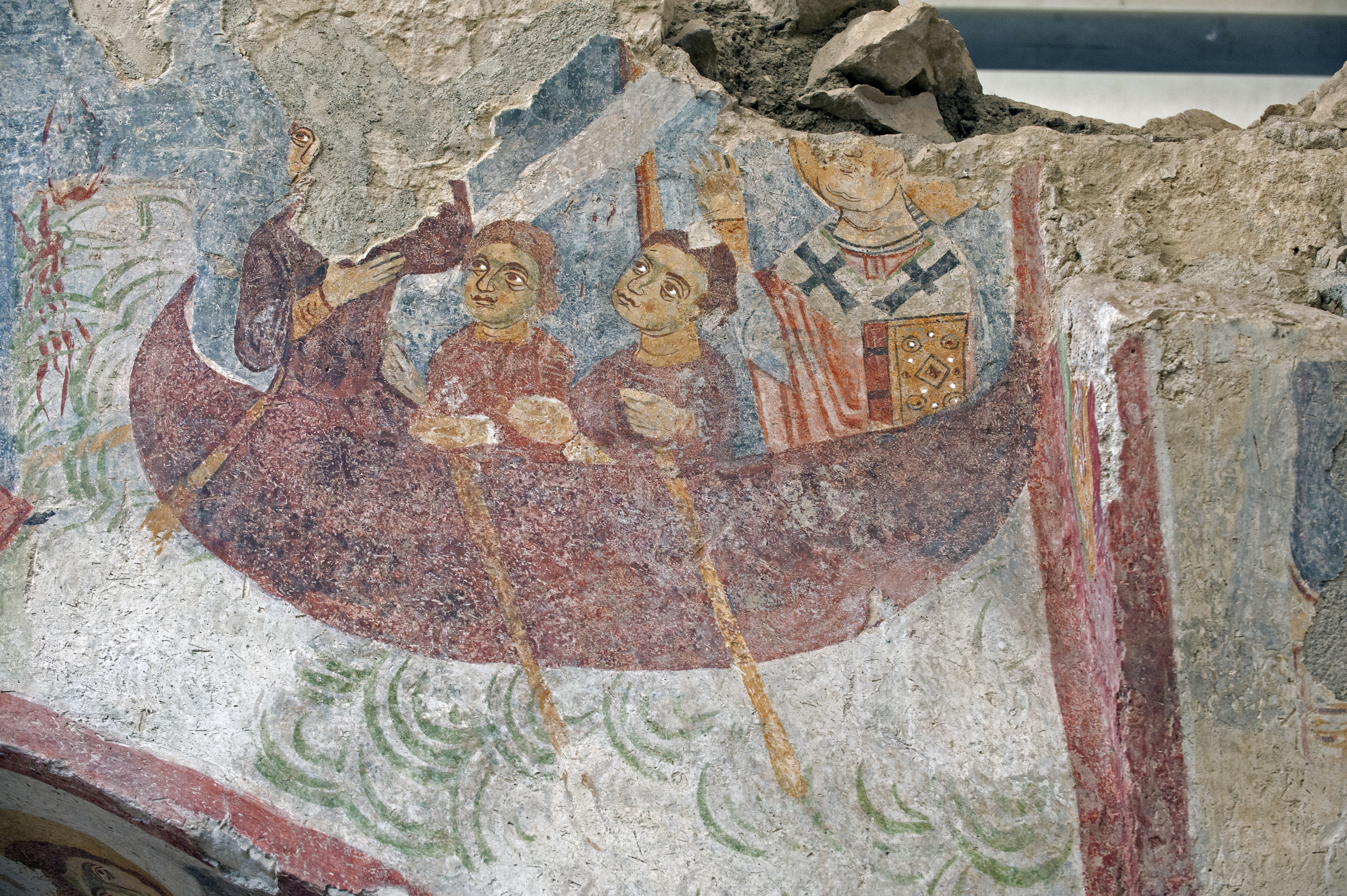
St. Nicholas Church Fresco

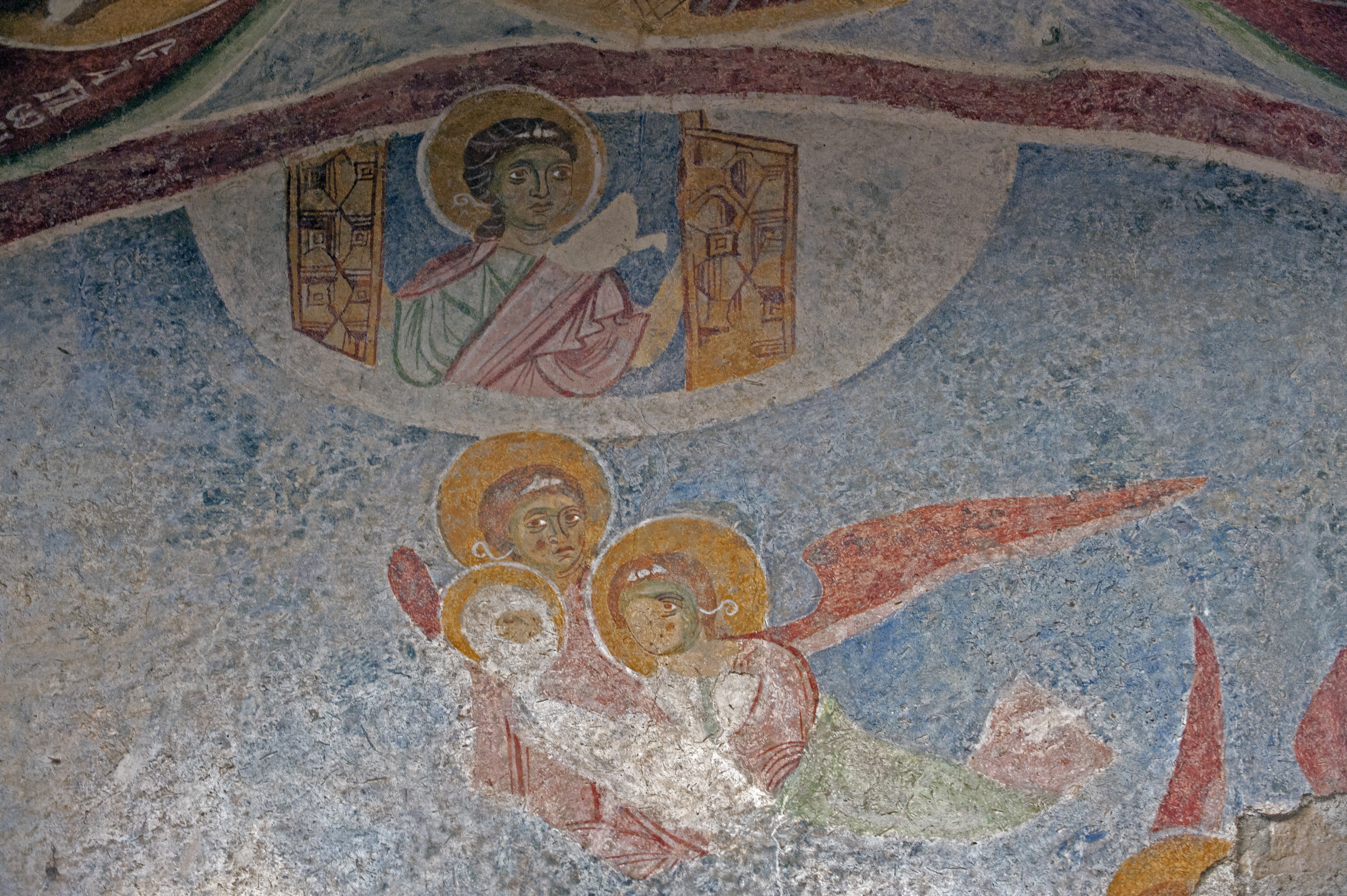
St. Nicholas Church Fresco

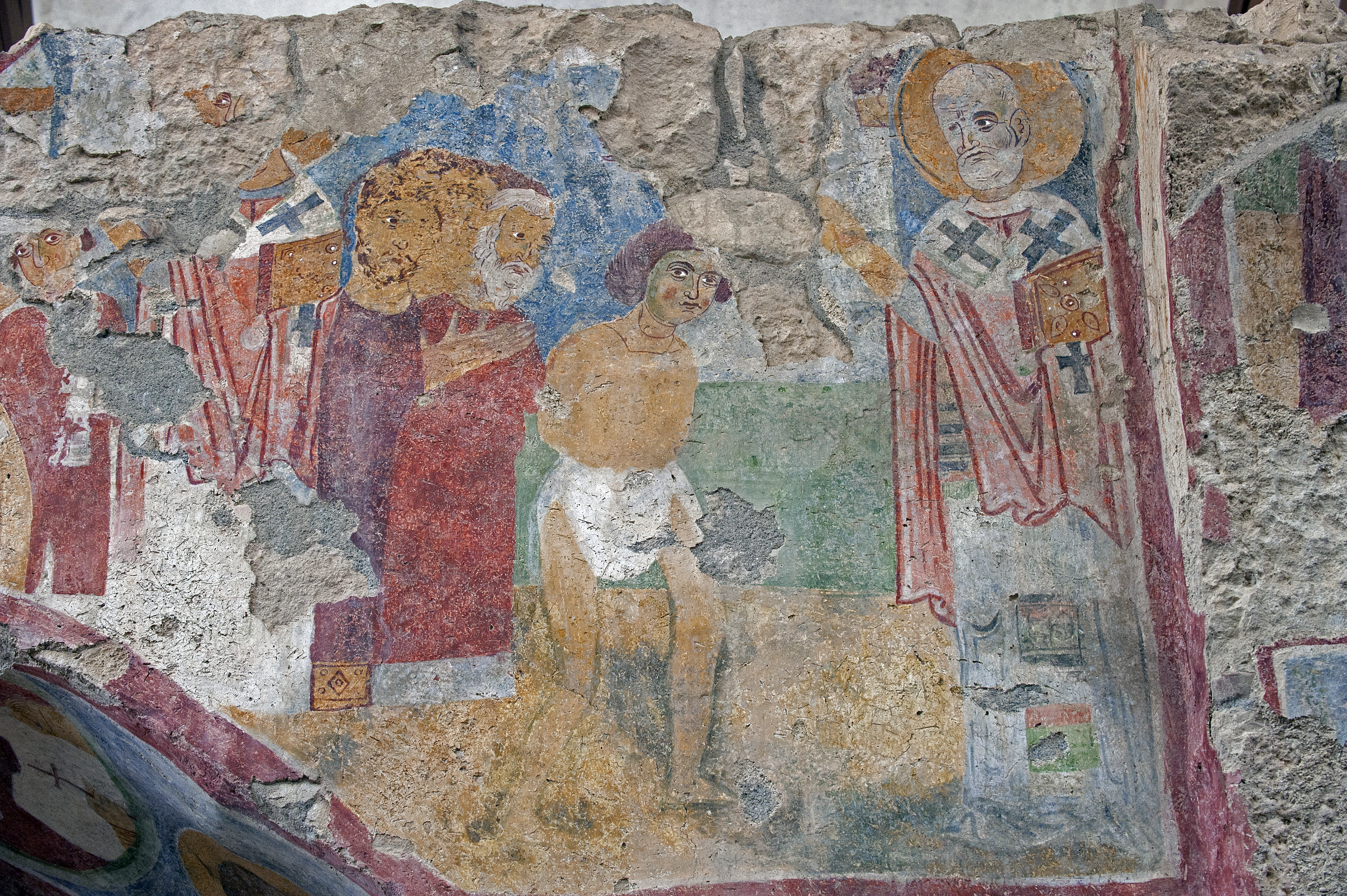
St. Nicholas Church Fresco

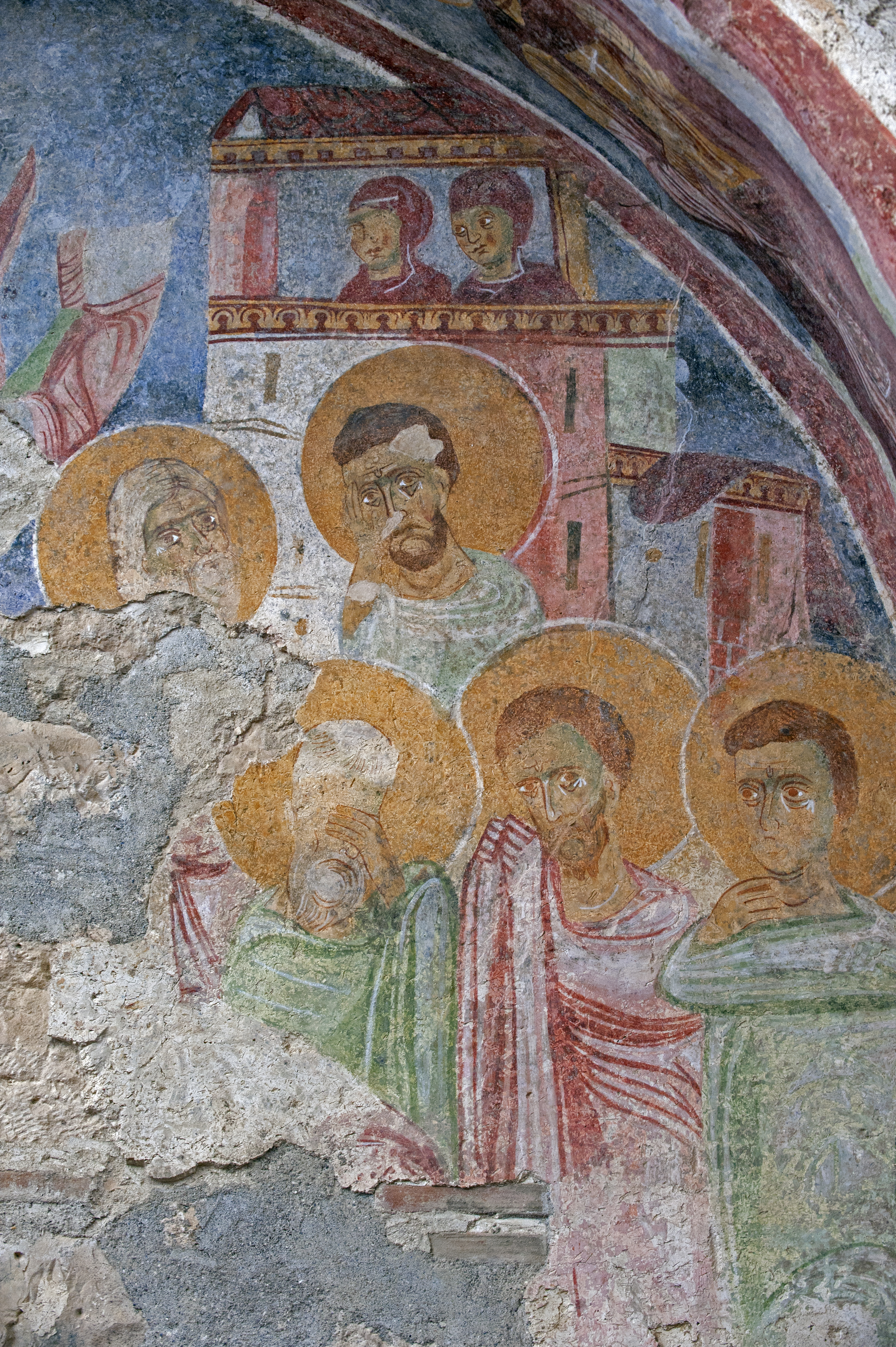
St. Nicholas Church Fresco

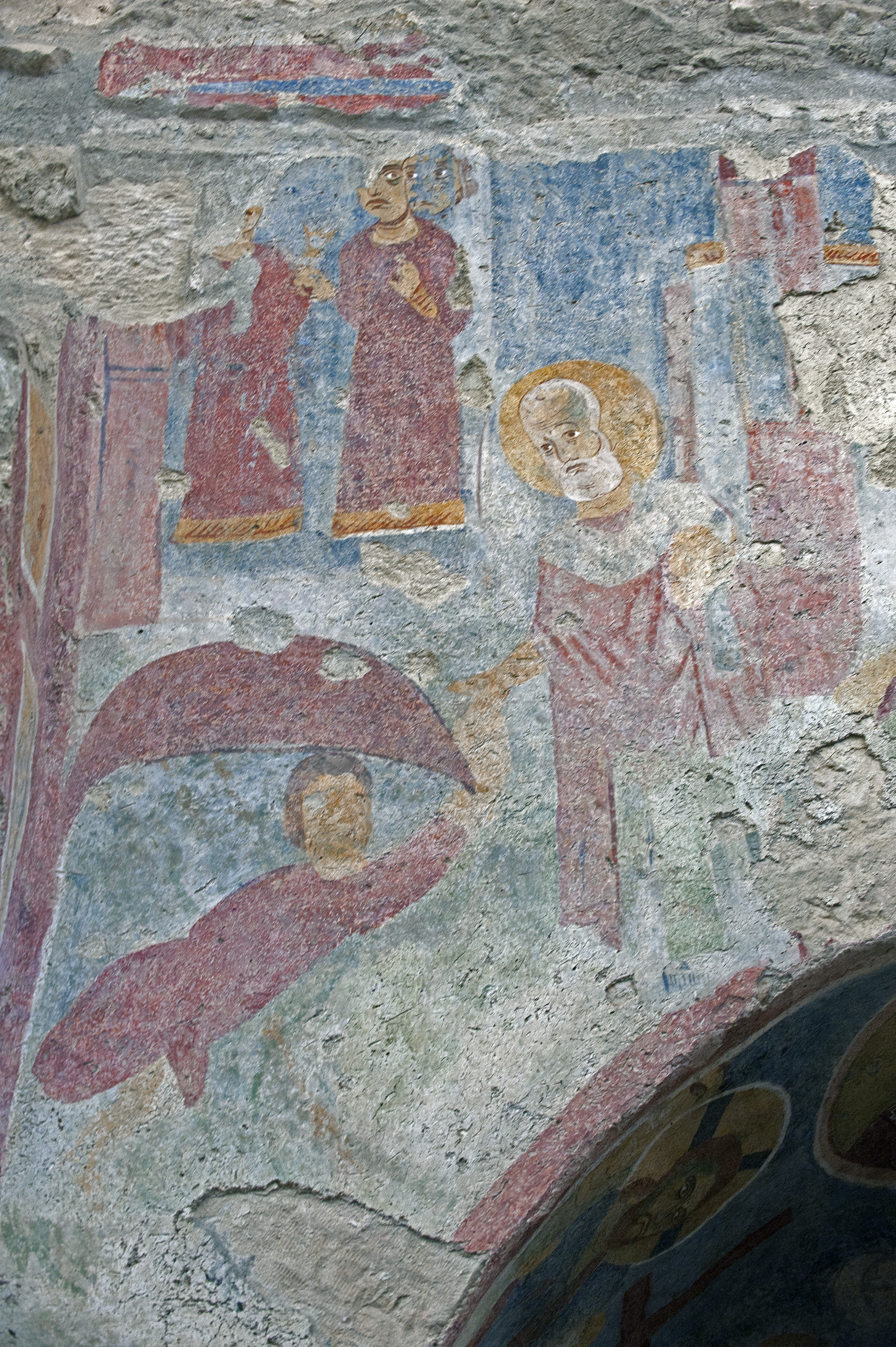
St. Nicholas Church Fresco

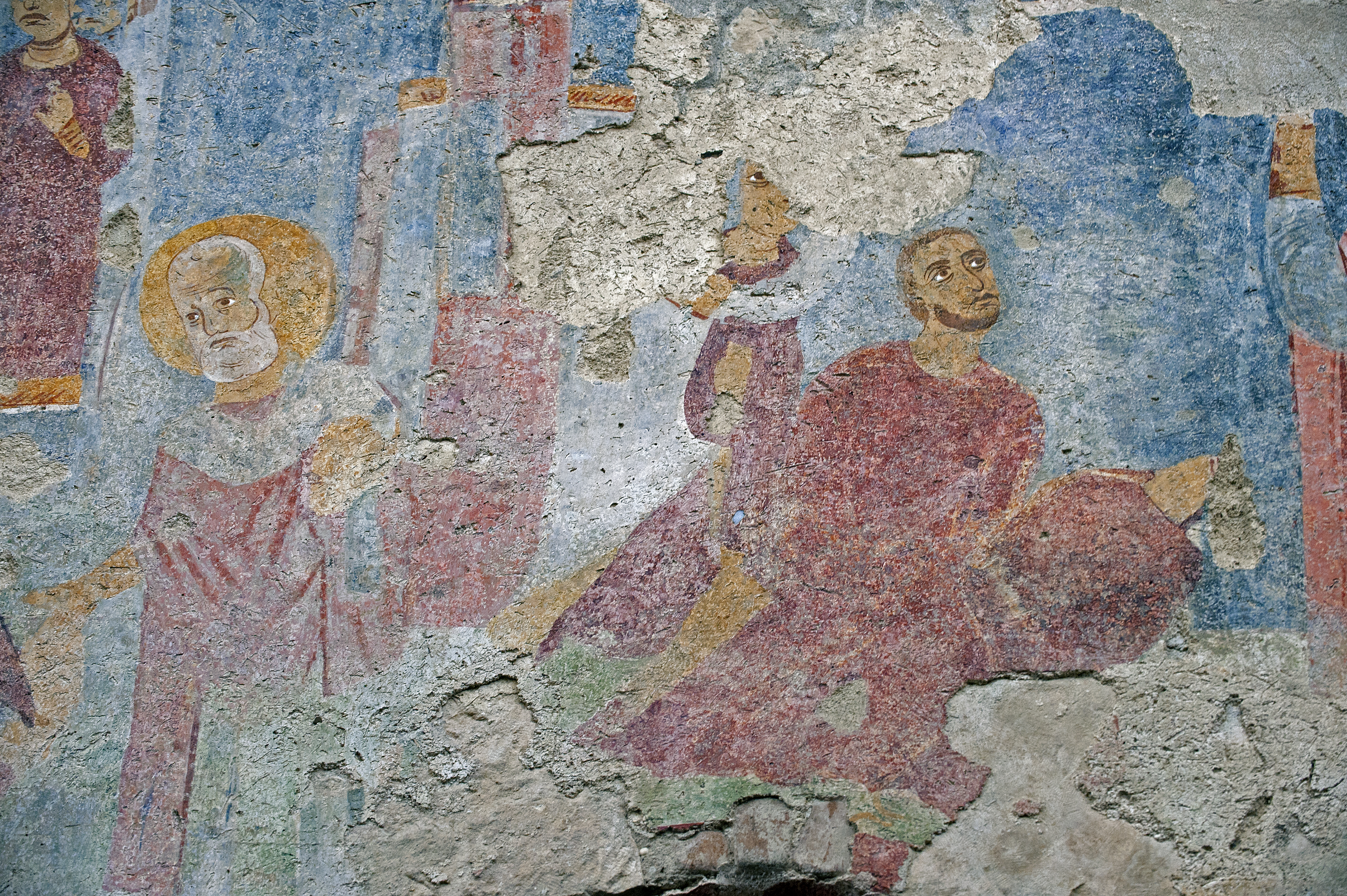
St. Nicholas Church Fresco

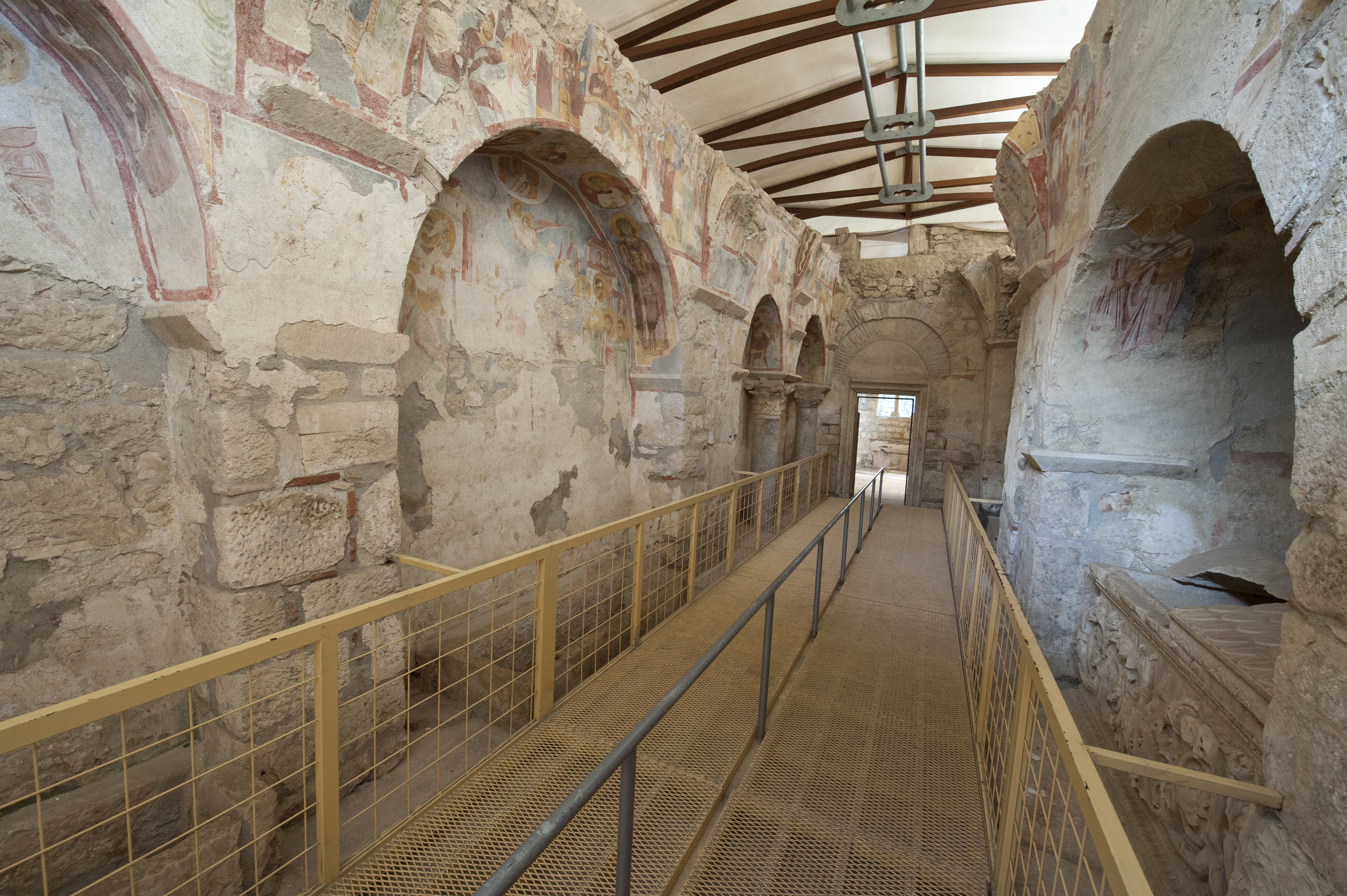
St. Nicholas Church corridor with Nicolas frescos

== Opus sectile ==
Parts of the church preserve opus sectile decoration.

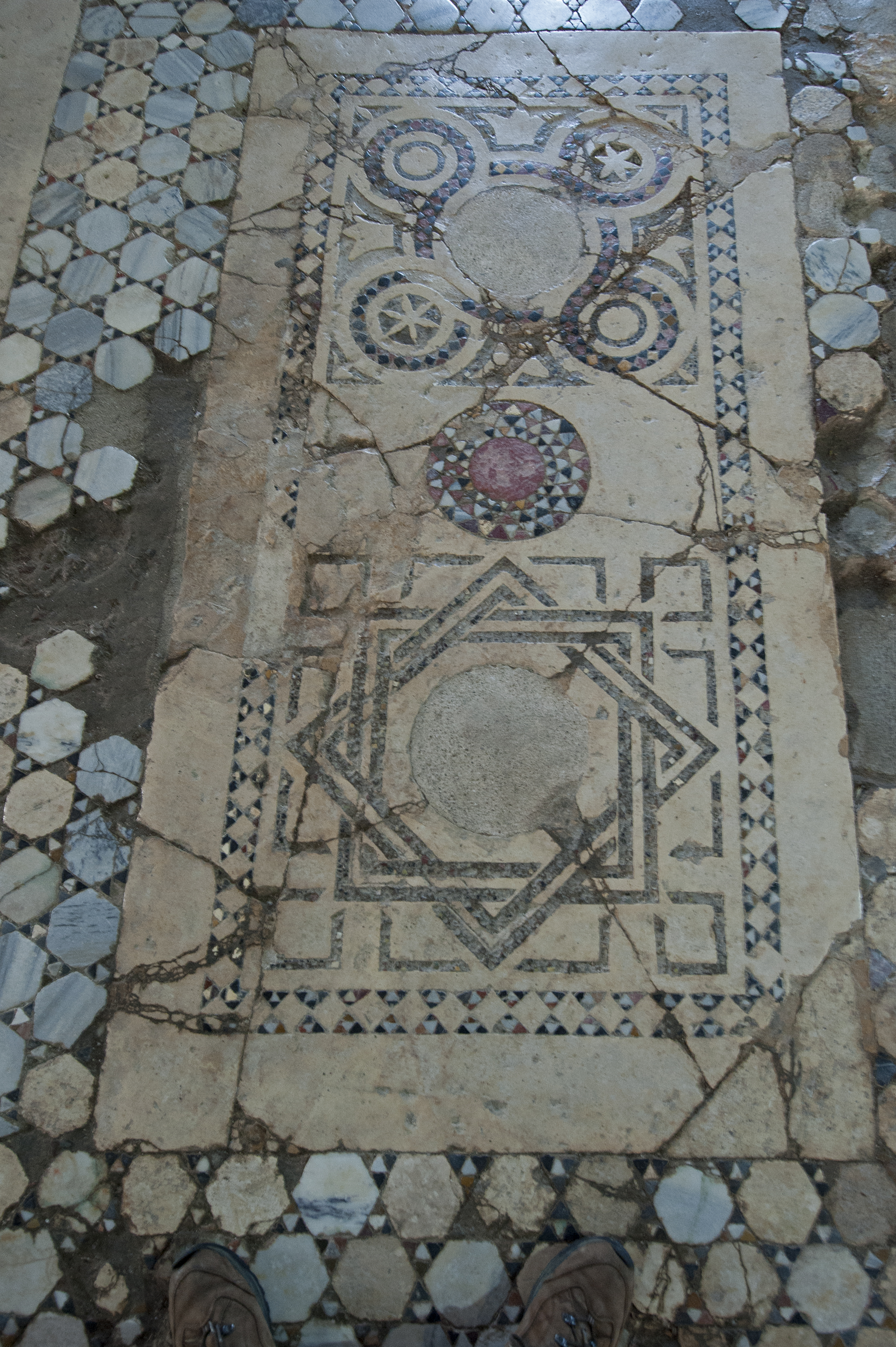
St. Nicholas Church opus sectile

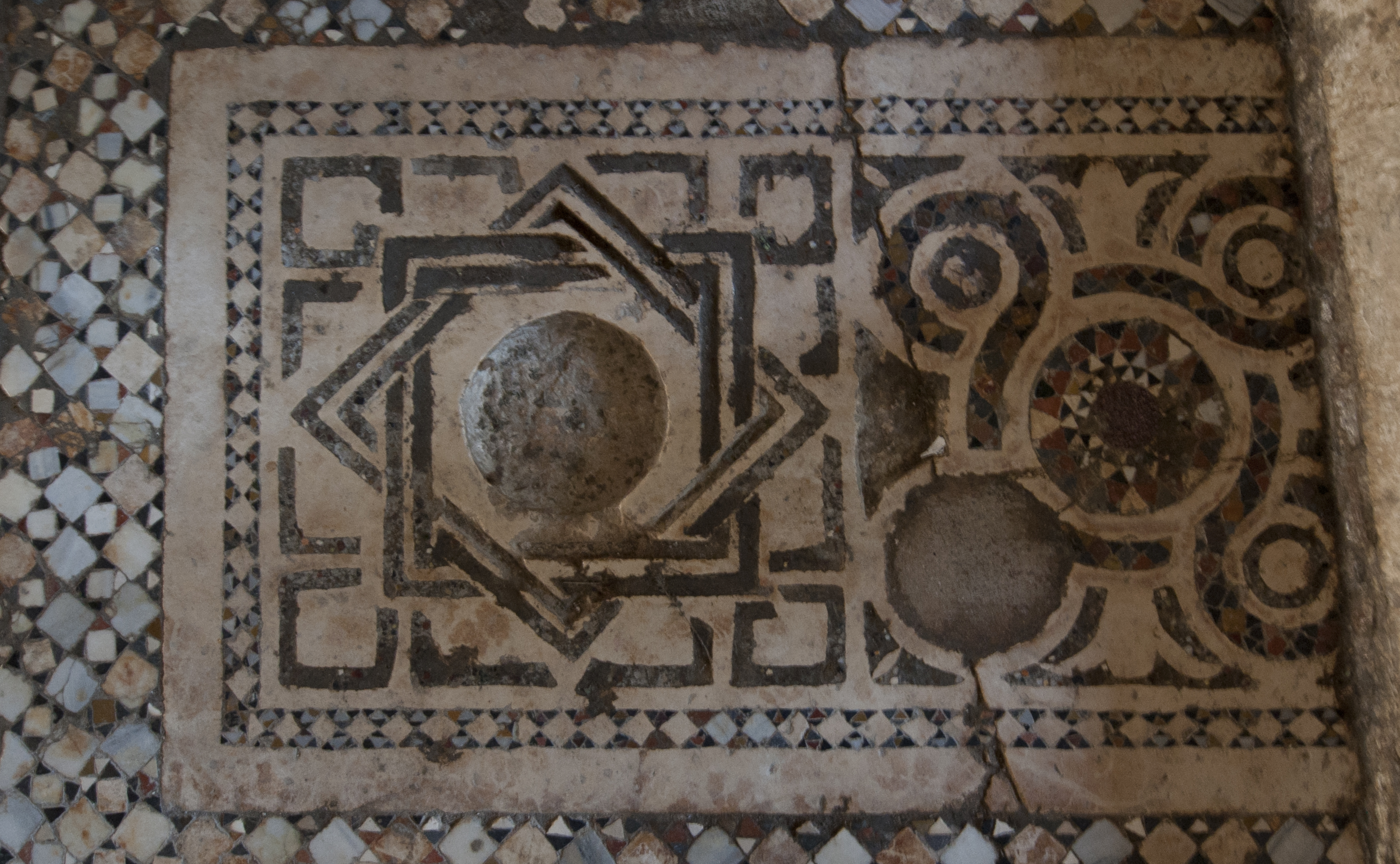
St. Nicholas Church opus sectile

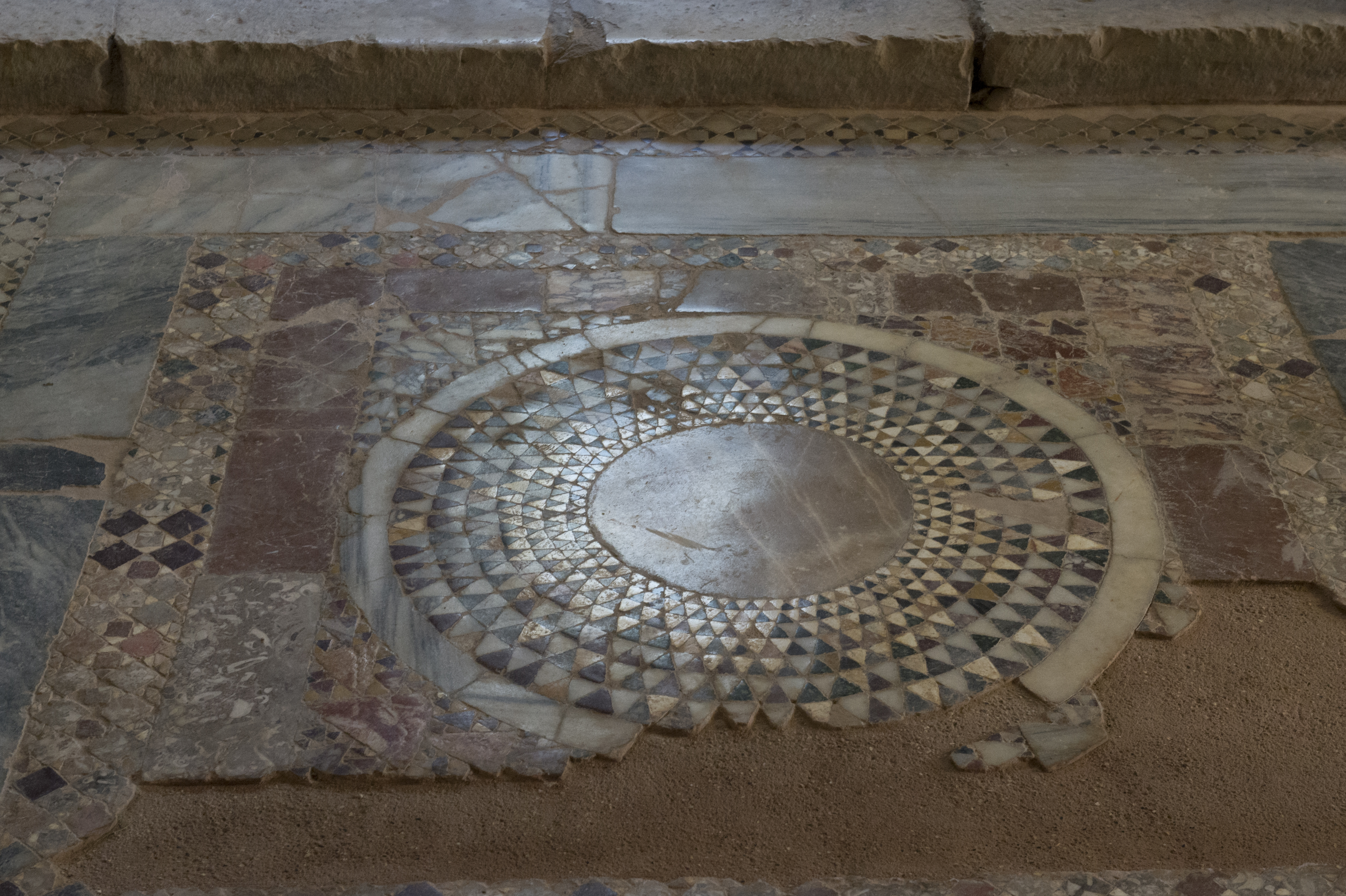
St. Nicholas Church opus sectile

== Liturgy ==
The Orthodox liturgy is occasionally celebrated in the church on 6 December.

== See also ==
- Ancient Roman and Byzantine domes
- Saint Nicholas Temple (Gulistan)
