= Mirzachoʻl =

Loess plain in Uzbekistan

Coordinates: 40.4136°N 68.3554°E

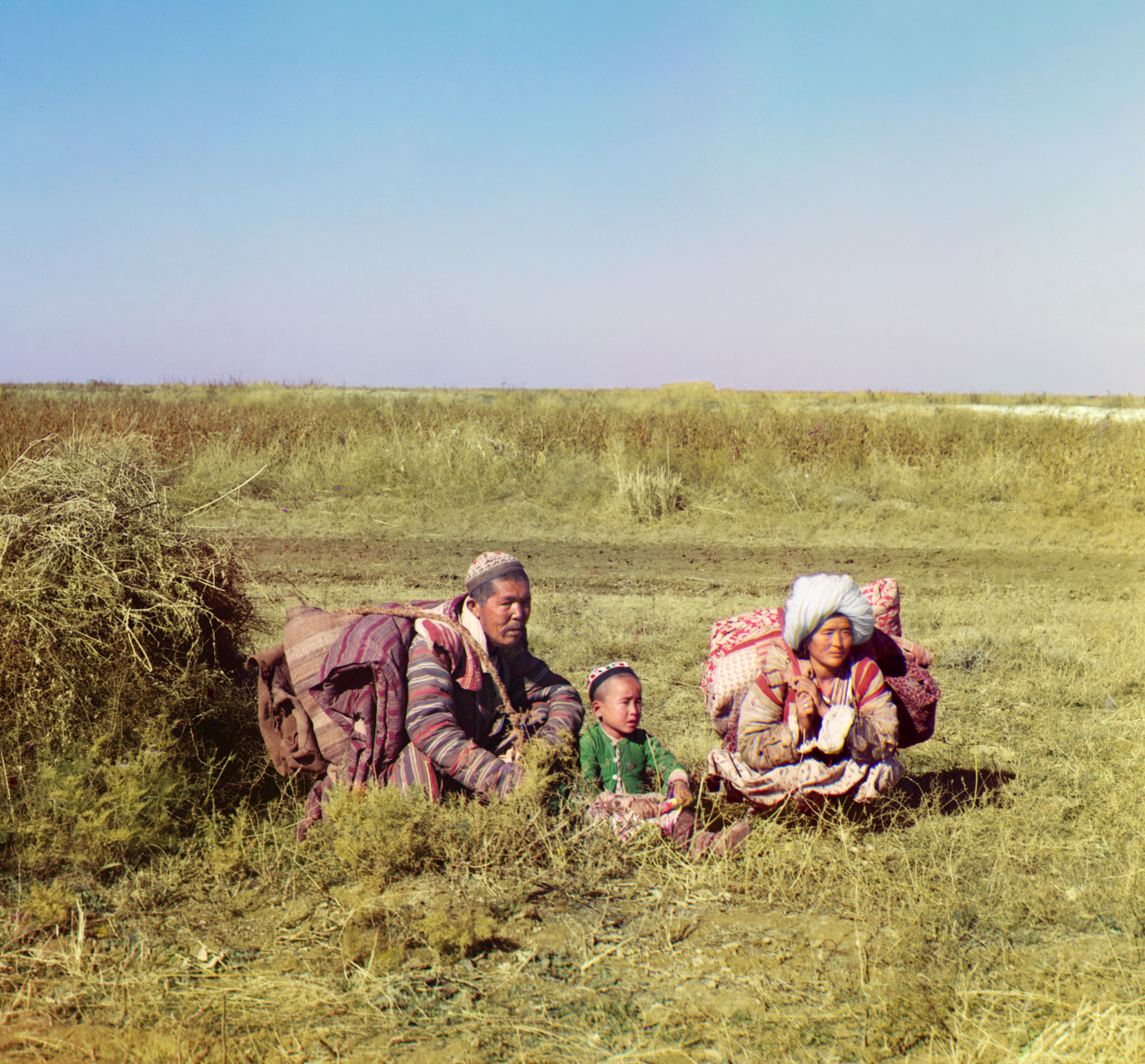
Nomadic Kyrgyz family on the Mirzachoʻl Steppe in Uzbekistan, 1911. (photograph by S. M. Prokudin-Gorskii)

Mirzachoʻl (Uzbek pronunciation: [mɪrzɐˈtʃɵl]; Russian: Голодная степь, lit. 'Hungry Steppe') is a loess plain of some 10,000 km^{2} on the left bank of Syr Darya in Uzbekistan, extending from the mouth of Ferghana Valley on the border with Tajikistan to the east across Sirdaryo Region and the northern part of Jizzakh Region to the west. To the south it is bounded by Turkestan Range.

Geographically Mirzachoʻl Steppe is a south-eastern extension of the Kyzyl Kum desert, with about 240 mm of annual precipitation and extreme continental climate (average temperatures from 28°C in July to −2°C in January). Efforts that began as early as the end of the 19th century gradually transformed the Mirzachoʻl Steppe from a desert into an intensively irrigated agricultural area, today one of the major cotton and grain producing regions of Uzbekistan with around 500,000 hectares of irrigated land under cultivation. Three main canals constructed in the 1950s and the 1960s bring water to Mirzachoʻl Steppe kolkhozes and sovkhozes. These are the north-south Central and Northern Canals and the east-west South Mirzachoʻl Steppe Canal.

Guliston and Yangiyer, both in Sirdaryo Region, are the main population centers in Mirzachoʻl Steppe.

== See also ==
- Betpak-Dala, known in Russian as the Severnaya Golodnaya Steppe (lit. Northern Hungry Steppe)
