= Guliston =

City in eastern Uzbekistan

Gulistan Guliston Гулистон (Uzbek)
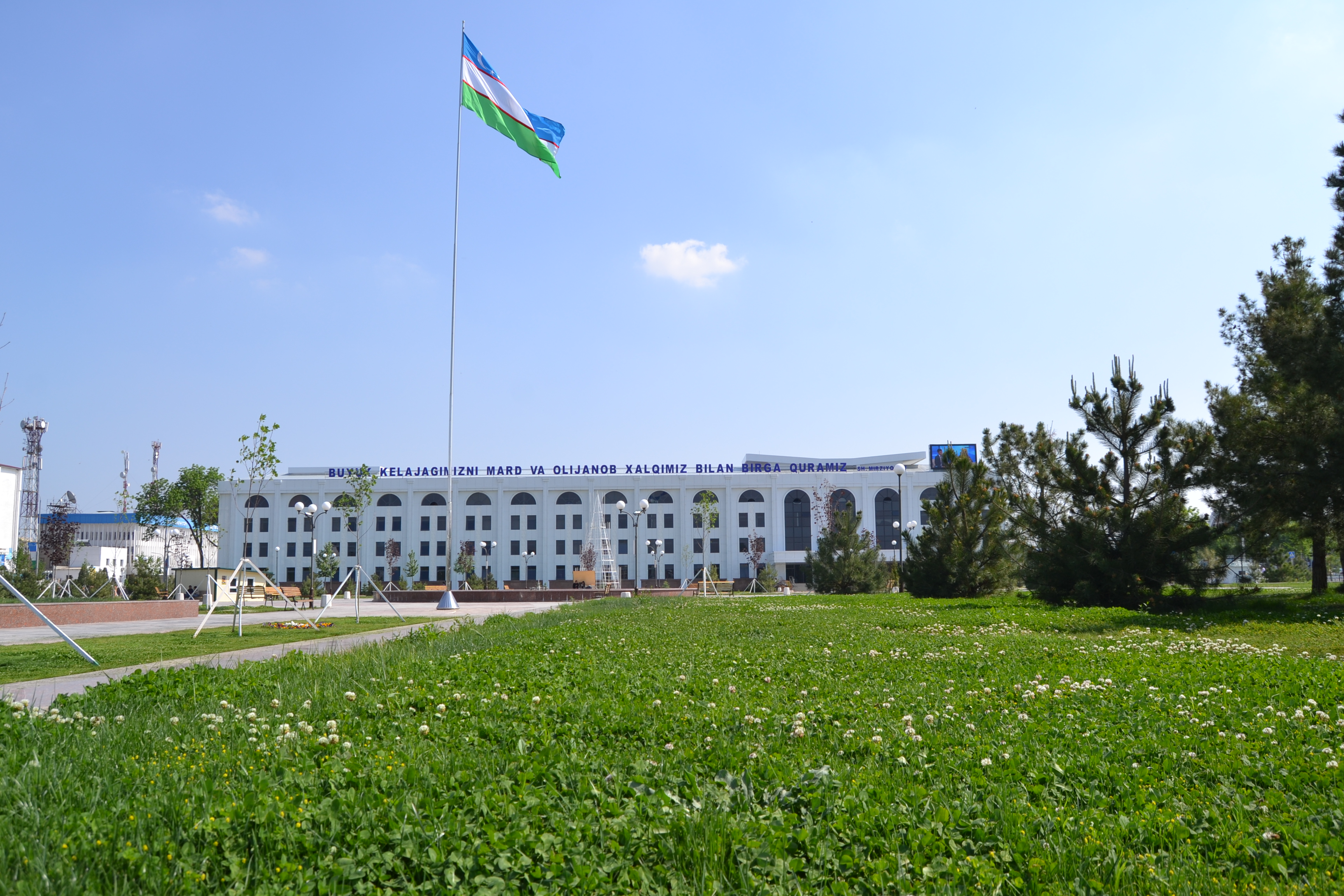
- Administration building and flagpole in Gulistan

- Location in Uzbekistan
- Coordinates: 40°29′N 68°47′E
- Country: Uzbekistan
- Region: Sirdaryo Region
- Established: 1801

Government
  - Type: City Administration
  - Mayor: Farrux Oʻktamjonov
- Elevation: 271 m (889 ft)

Population (2025)
  - Total: 102,083
- Postal code: 120100
- Area code: (+998) 672

Gulistan (Uzbek pronunciation: [gʉlɪsˈtɒn]), known before 1961 as Mirzachul (pronounced [mɪrzɐˈtʃɵl]) and as Kayrokkum (pronounced [qɐɪrɒqˈqum]) until 2015, is the capital of Sirdaryo Region in eastern Uzbekistan. It is a district-level city.

== History ==
In the 19th century there was a kishlak Achchikkuduk ("well with salt water"), which had 40 households, a mosque, and a chaikhana.

In 1869, by order of the Governor-General of Turkestan Konstantin Petrovich von Kaufmann, the possibility of irrigating the Mirzachoʻl was explored.

In 1886, land diggers who arrived from different places of Russia for the construction of the canal formed 8 small Russian settlements in Khojikent district: Romanovsky (Peasant), Zaporozhsky, Nadezhdinsky, Nikolaevsky, Obetovanny, Nizhnevolynsky, Verkhnevolynsky and Konnogvardeysky (Red Dawn).

The construction of a canal 84 km long, named after Nicholas I and brought to Mirzachoʻl (Gulistan), which was put into operation in 1895, began in 1872.

From 7600 hectares of irrigated land 2100 hectares were allotted to the knyaz, who lived in Romanovsky settlement, 3380 hectares - to Russian settlers, 220 hectares - to the experimental field.

In 1897 near the station Golodnaya Steppe (Mirzachoʻl) the settlement Dukhovsky was formed, in 1906 the settlement Spassky was created. On the eve of the First World War in these already united settlements there were 290 households (the town of Guliston later grew up in their place).

During the same period, there was laid a railroad from Samarkand to Tashkent through the Hungry Steppe. Its construction was completed in 1895. Achchikkuduk station was called Griboedovka, and since 1905 - Golodnaya Steppe, as well as the settlement.

There were built the buildings of the canal administration and the first Russian-native school in Golodnaya Steppe in 1905. Since 1910 the canal was called the Northern Golodnostepsky canal.

In 1922 the settlement Golodnaya Steppe was renamed to Mirzachul. In 1952 it received the status of urban-type settlement, being a part of Tashkent region.

On May 8, 1961 the settlement of urban-type Mirzachul was converted into the city of Gulistan. On November 26, 1963 it became the center of the Syrdaryo region created at the beginning of the same year. In 1989, in connection with the unification of Jizzakh and Syrdaryo regions, the city of Jizzakh became the regional center.

On February 16, 1990 after restoration of Jizzak region the center of Syrdaryo region was moved from Jizzak to Gulistan.

== Geography and climate ==
=== Geography ===
It lies in the southeastern part of the Mirzachül (formerly Golodnaya steppe), 120 kilometres (75 mi) southwest of Tashkent. Its population is 91,300 (2021). The main industry in the area is cottonpicking.

=== Climate ===
Guliston has a hot-summer Mediterranean climate (Köppen Csa).

Climate data for Guliston (1981–2010)
Month	Jan	Feb	Mar	Apr	May	Jun	Jul	Aug	Sep	Oct	Nov	Dec	Year
Mean daily maximum °C (°F)	5.0 (41.0)	8.5 (47.3)	15.4 (59.7)	23.1 (73.6)	29.0 (84.2)	34.7 (94.5)	36.2 (97.2)	34.7 (94.5)	29.5 (85.1)	22.4 (72.3)	14.1 (57.4)	6.5 (43.7)	21.6 (70.9)
Mean daily minimum °C (°F)	−3.4 (25.9)	−1.5 (29.3)	3.7 (38.7)	9.2 (48.6)	13.7 (56.7)	17.4 (63.3)	18.6 (65.5)	16.2 (61.2)	10.7 (51.3)	5.8 (42.4)	1.8 (35.2)	−2.2 (28.0)	7.5 (45.5)
Average precipitation mm (inches)	39.1 (1.54)	46.3 (1.82)	52.6 (2.07)	43.8 (1.72)	28.8 (1.13)	6.2 (0.24)	2.8 (0.11)	1.3 (0.05)	5.0 (0.20)	18.5 (0.73)	32.6 (1.28)	47.3 (1.86)	324.3 (12.75)
Average precipitation days	12	12	12	11	9	5	2	1	2	6	9	12	93
Source: Centre of Hydrometeorological Service of Uzbekistan

== Demographics ==
Historical population
Year	Pop.	±% p.a.
1979	43,087	—
1989	54,360	+2.35%
2005	55,600	+0.14%
2020	90,398	+3.29%

== Religious sights ==
Saint Nicholas Temple is an architectural monument located in the city of Guliston (Sirdaryo region, Uzbekistan). The church was built in 1945 as a house of prayer. It is located at 94 Turkestan Street in Guliston. In 1890, in the village of Guliston in the Turkestan Governorate of the Russian Empire, a large brick church was erected. It could accommodate no fewer than a hundred parishioners, but it was demolished in the 1930s during the Soviet era. In 1945, a decision was made to build a new house of prayer in Guliston. The new house of prayer, constructed from adobe brick, was built in less than a year and opened its doors to parishioners on November 9, 1945.
