= Saint Nicholas Temple (Gulistan) =

- Храм Николая Чудотворца
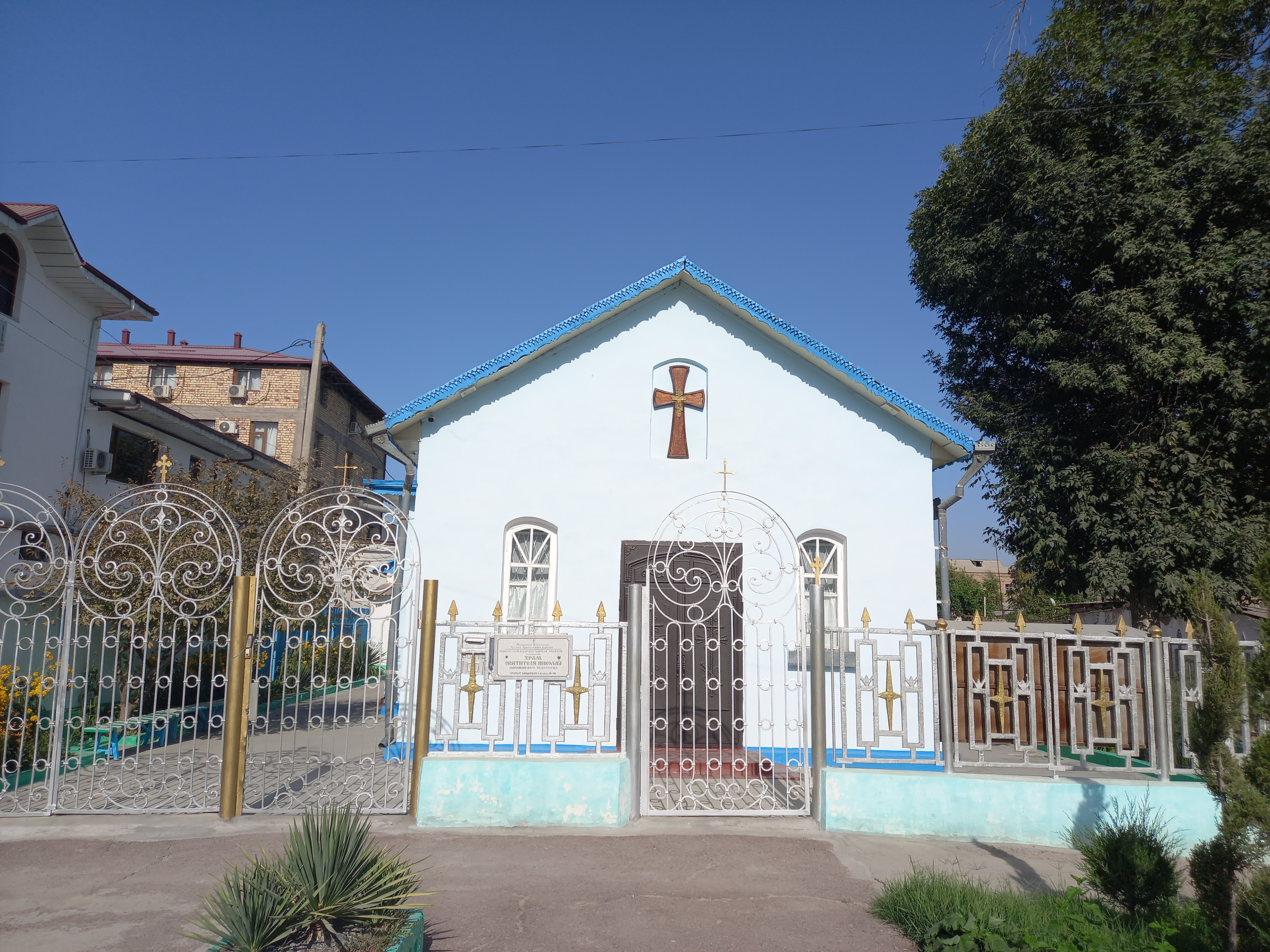
- Church of Saint Nicholas
- Saint Nicholas Temple
- 40.497209553564204°N 68.76749194583628°E
- Location: City of Guliston, Sirdaryo Region, Uzbekistan
- Country: Uzbekistan
- Denomination: Russian Orthodox Church

History
- Status: Church

Saint Nicholas Temple (Russian: Храм Николая Чудотворца) is an architectural monument located in the city of Guliston (Sirdaryo Region, Uzbekistan). The church was built in 1945 as a house of prayer. It is located at 94 Turkestan Street in Guliston.

== History ==
In 1890, in the village of Guliston in the Turkestan Governorate of the Russian Empire, a large brick church was erected. It could accommodate no fewer than a hundred parishioners, but it was demolished in the 1930s during the Soviet era. In 1945, a decision was made to build a new house of prayer in Guliston. The new house of prayer, constructed from adobe brick, was built in less than a year and opened its doors to parishioners on November 9, 1945.

In 1955, it was registered as a church and consecrated in memory of Saint Nicholas. Reconstruction began on June 10, 1955, with the permission of Bishop Hermogenes of Nikolsk. In 1957, a narthex was built, and the crosses were raised. Bishop Hermogenes consecrated the reconstruction of the House of Prayer, and the narthex was consecrated by Archpriest Fyodor Siminenko.

== Abbots ==
In the 1980s and 1990s, Father Nikolai Pustovit served in the church. From 1997 to 2005, the rector of the church was Father Oleg Varavin. Since 2005 and up to the present, the parish has been led by Father Pavel Sergeyev.

== Gallery ==
Gallery

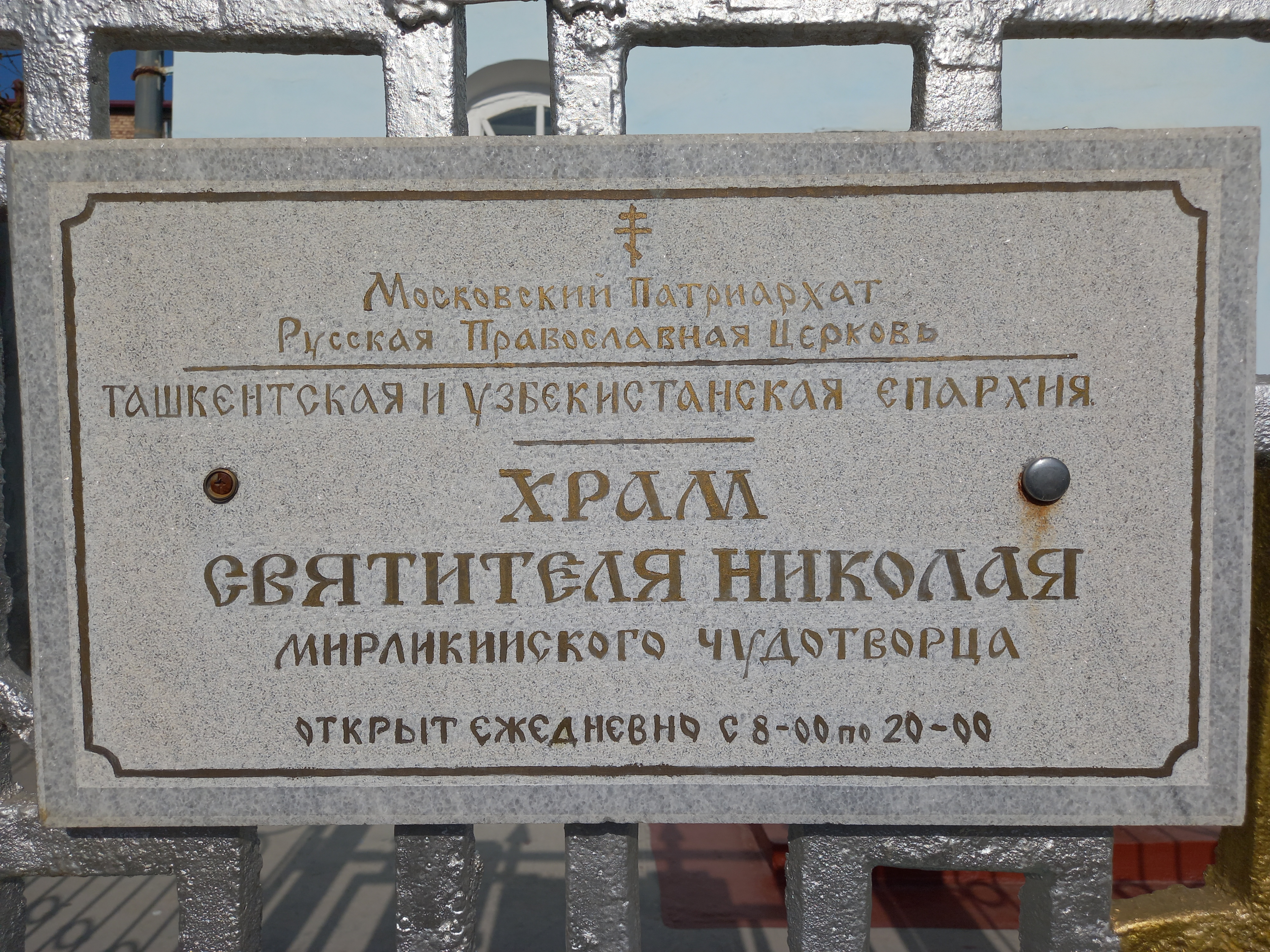
Church of Saint Nicholas

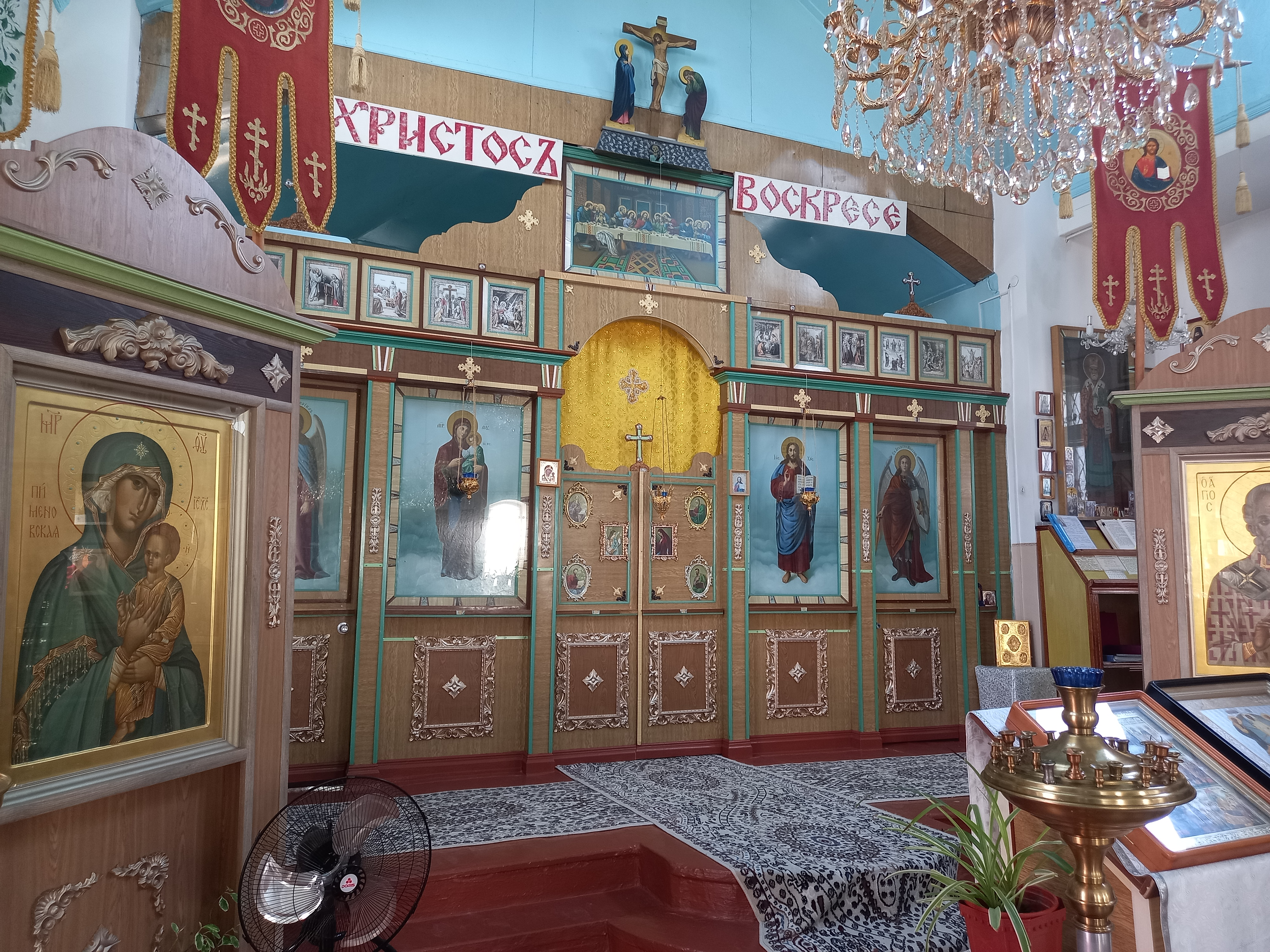
Church of Saint Nicholas

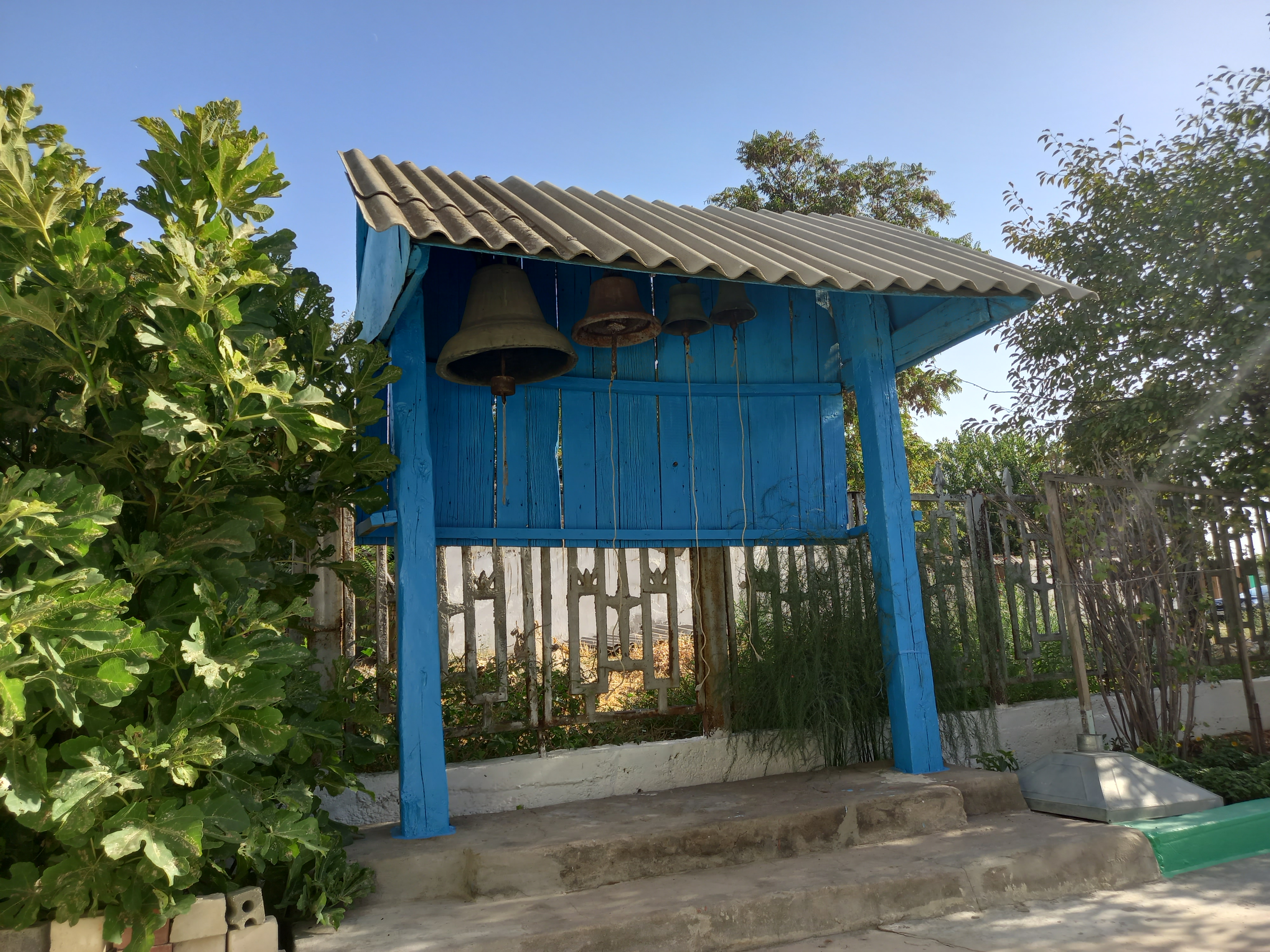
Church of Saint Nicholas

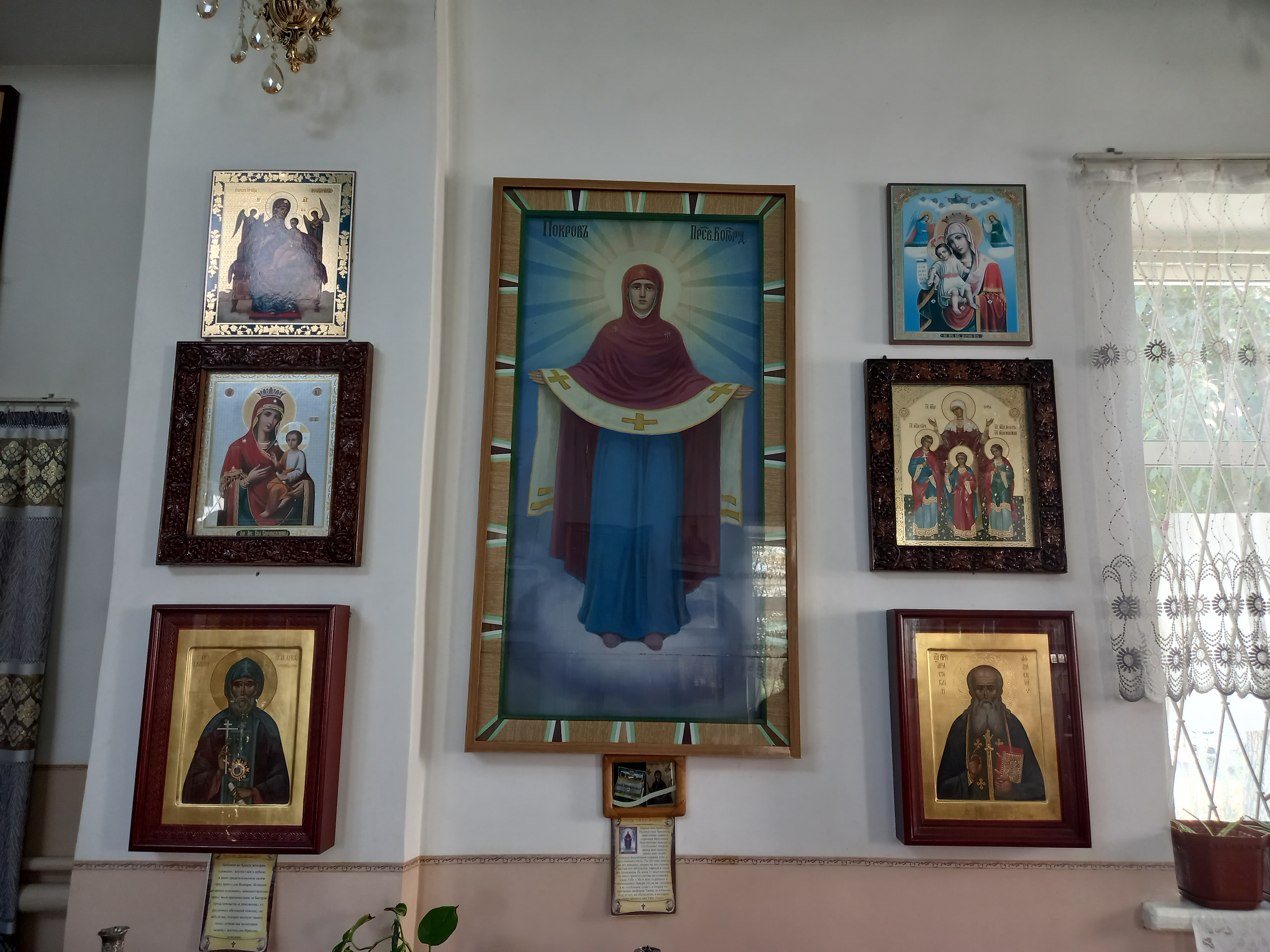
Church of Saint Nicholas

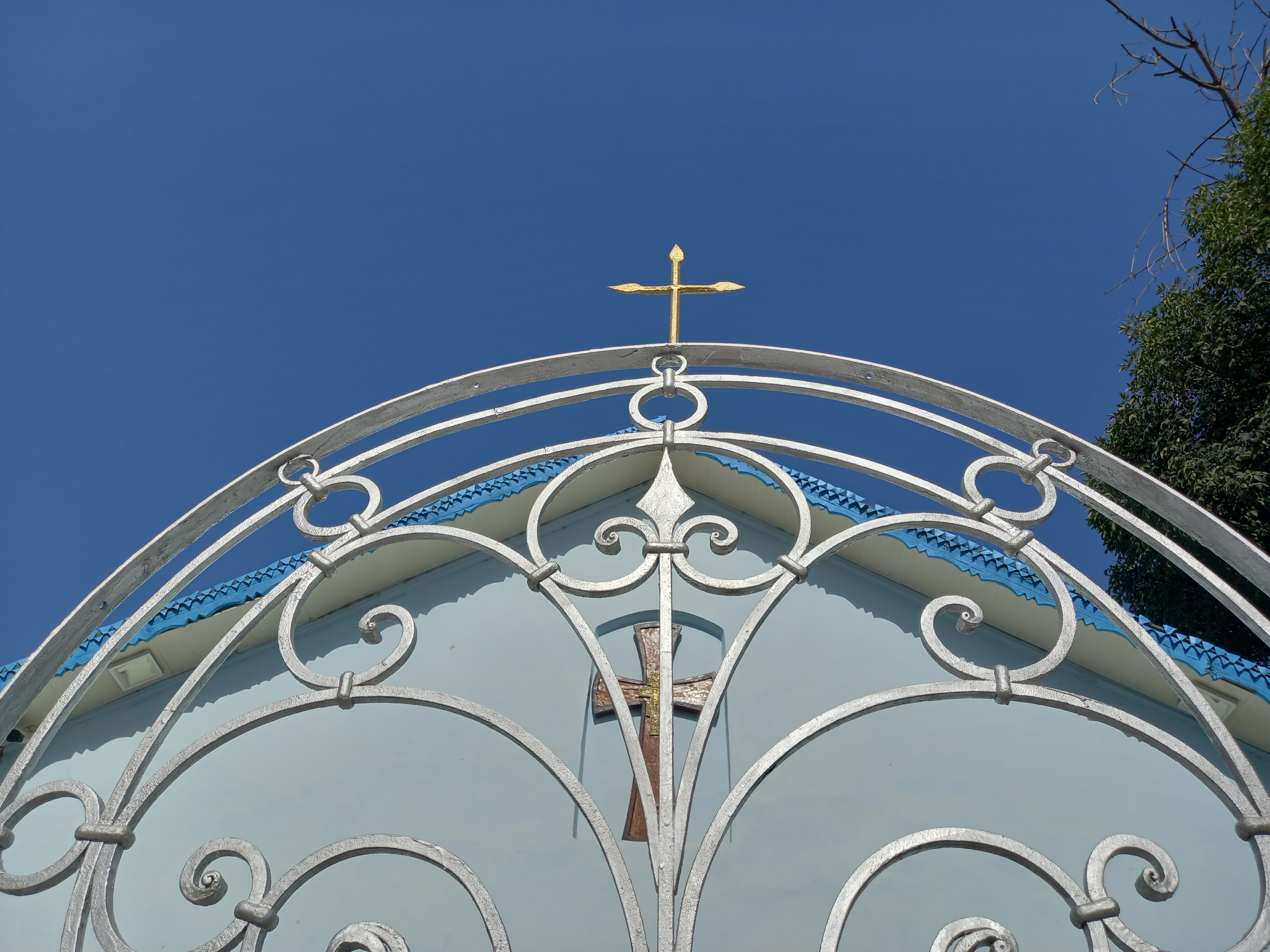
Church of Saint Nicholas

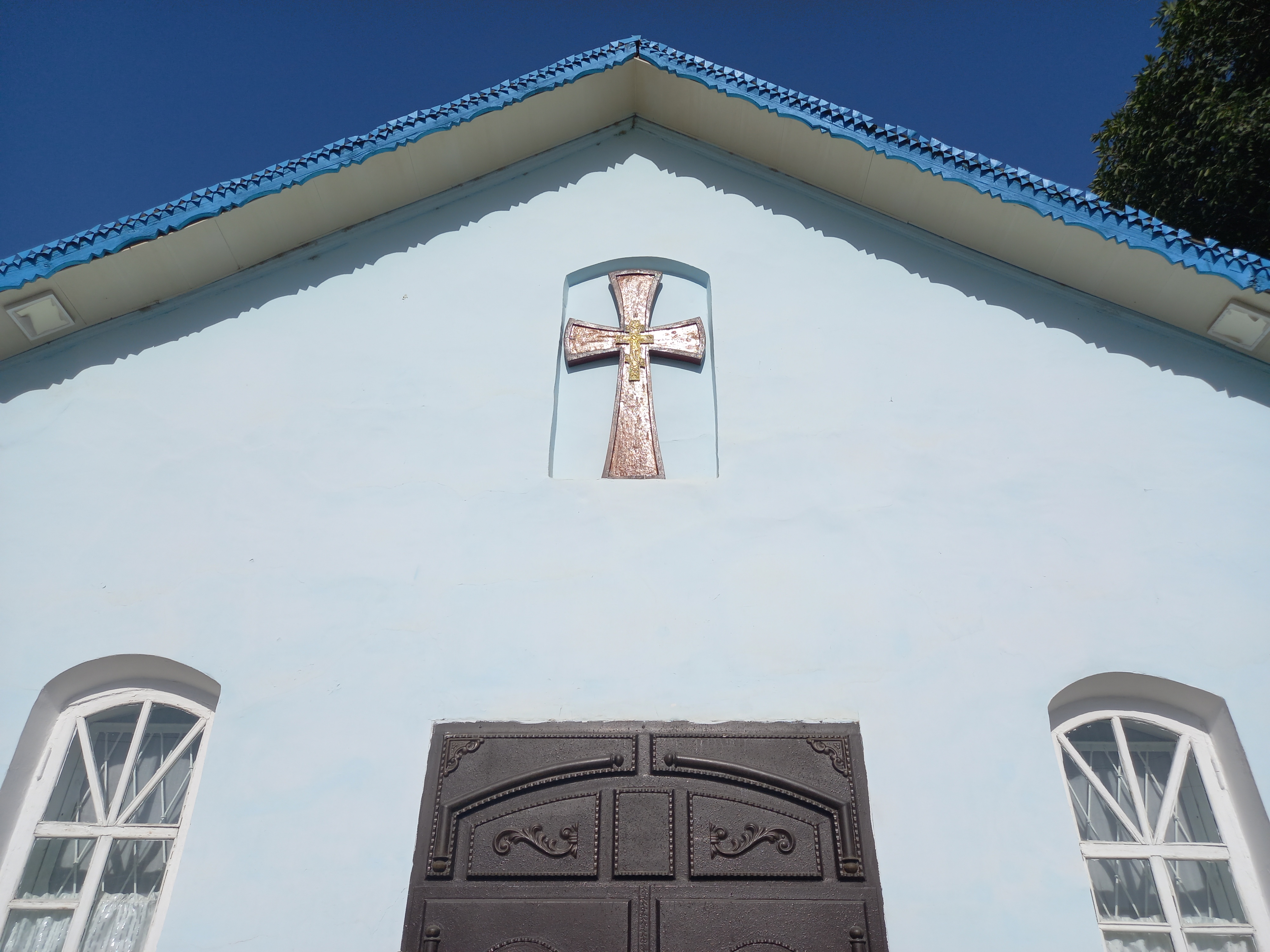
Church of Saint Nicholas

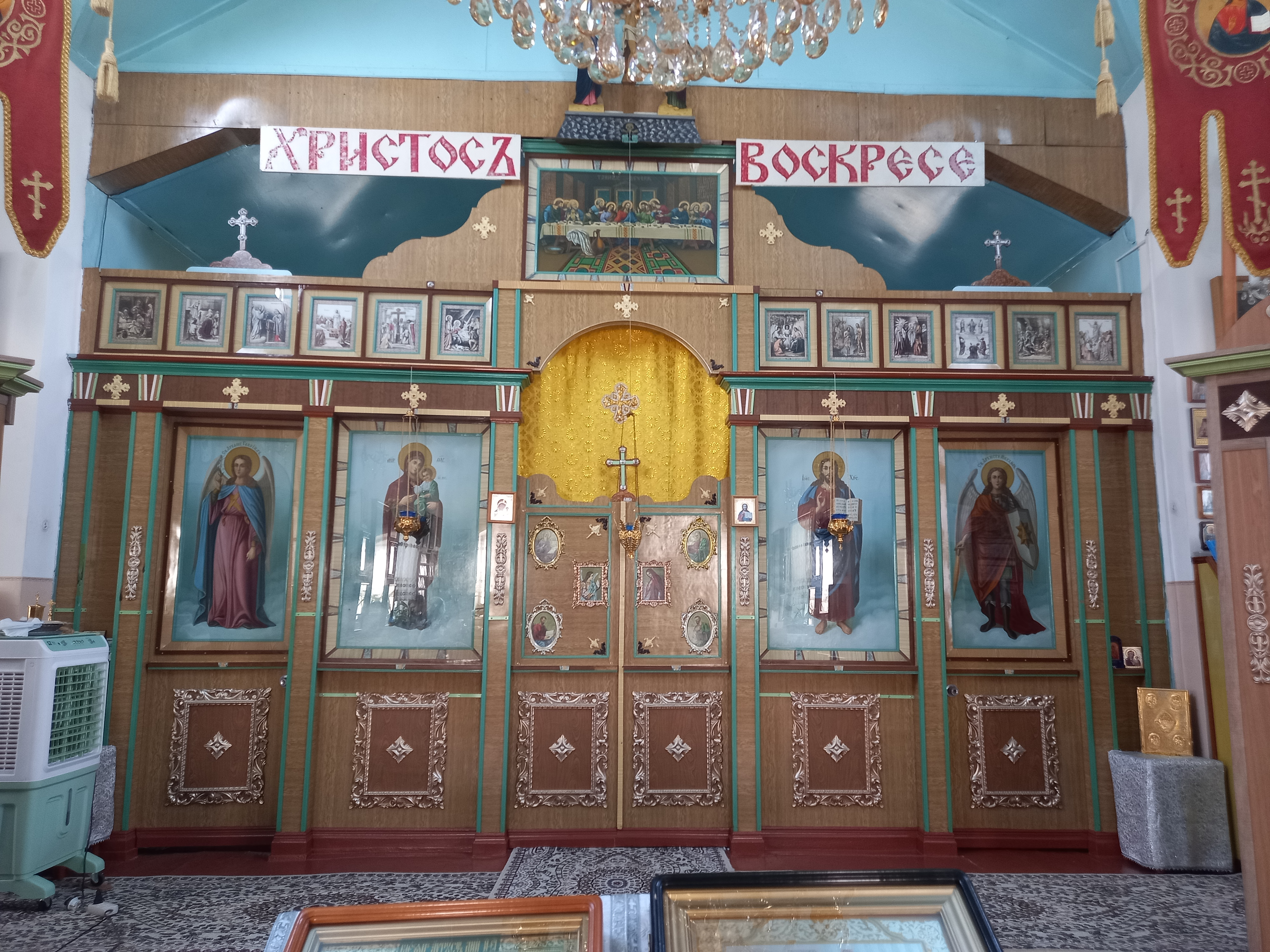
Church of Saint Nicholas

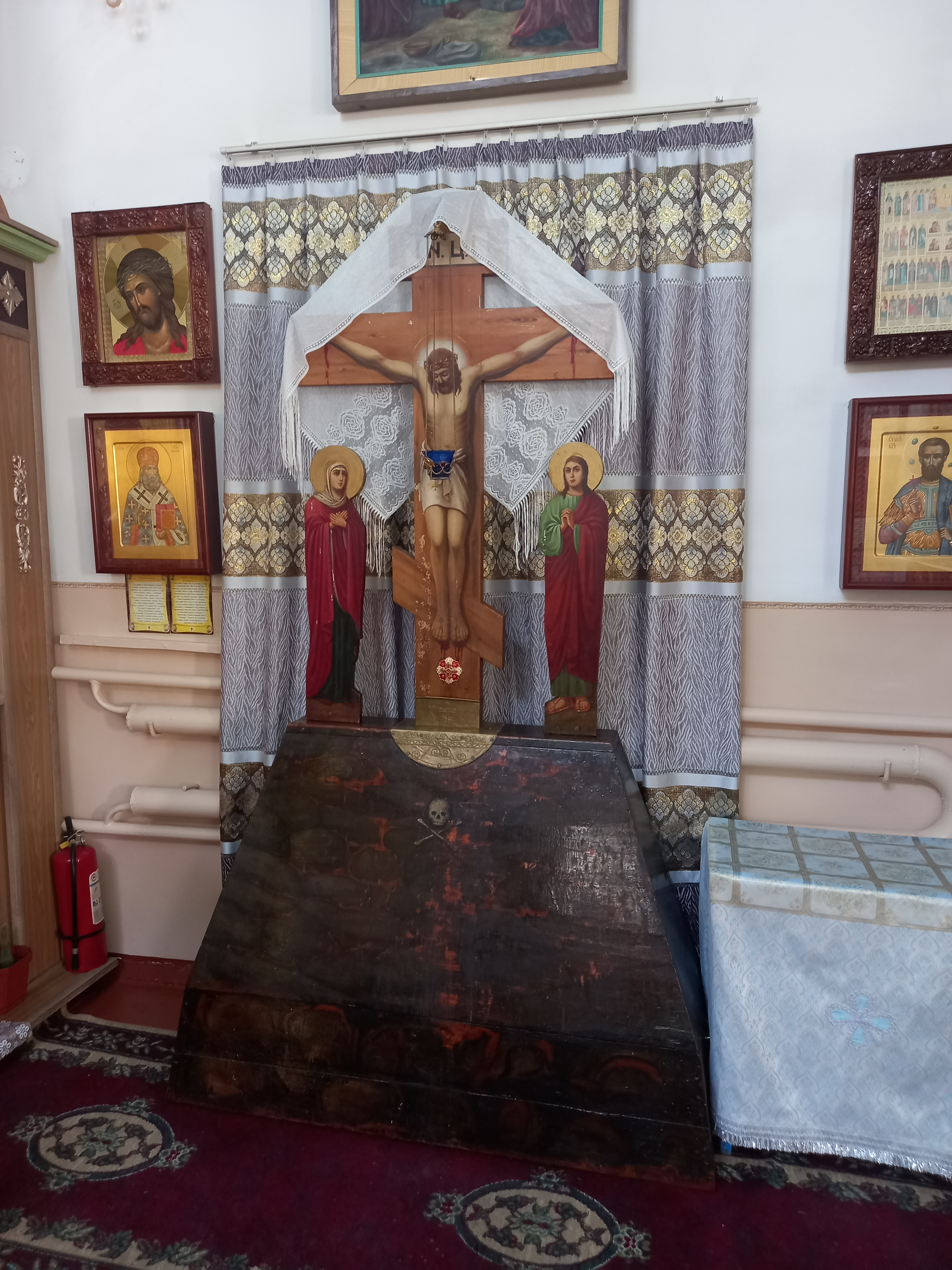
Church of Saint Nicholas

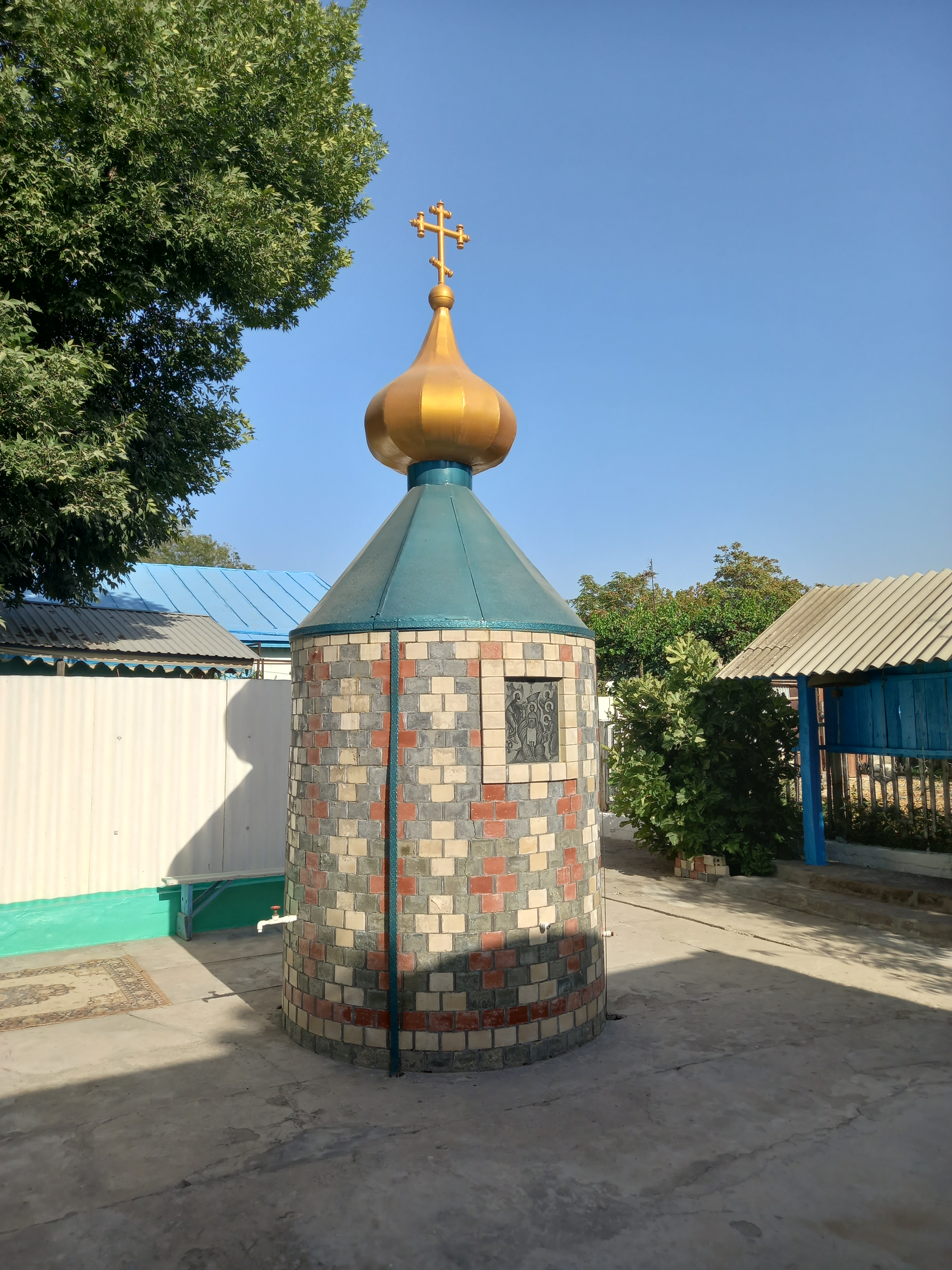
Church of Saint Nicholas
