= Timeline of entomology since 1900 =

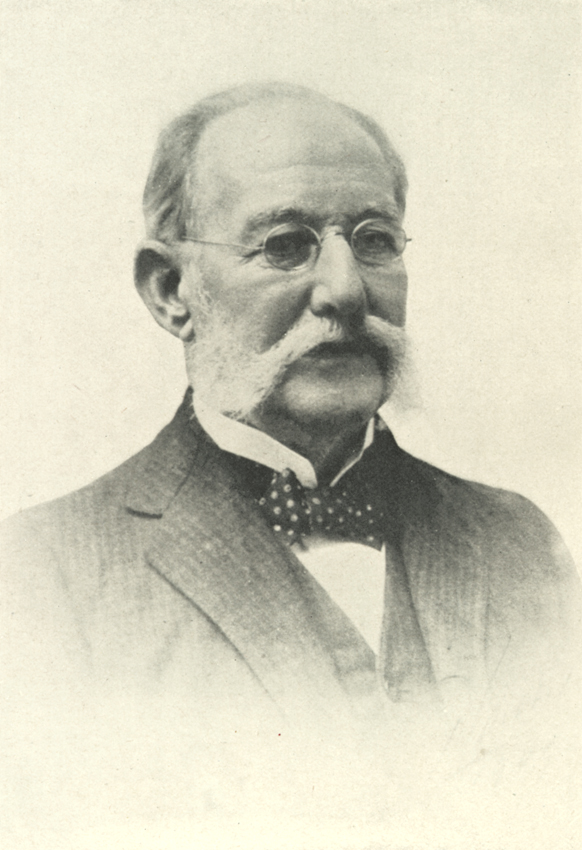
Juan Carlos Finlay

1900

- Walter Reed, a United States Army major, was appointed president of a board "to study infectious diseases in Cuba paying particular attention to yellow fever." He concurred with Carlos Finlay in identifying mosquitoes as the agent.
- Ignacio Bolívar y Urrutia publishes Catálogo sinóptico de los ortópteros de la fauna ibérica.
- Kálmán Kertész, Mario Bezzi, Paul Stein (entomologist) and Theodor Becker published the first part of a Palaearctic Catalogue of Diptera Katalog der Paläarktischen dipteren in Budapest.

1901

- William Francis de Vismes Kane A catalogue of the Lepidoptera of Ireland-the third (and first comprehensive) catalogue of the Irish macrolepidoptera.
- Augustus Daniel Imms General textbook of Entomology published. 10th revised edition (1977) still one of the most widely used of all insect texts.
- Thomas Hunt Morgan is the first to conduct genetic research with the fruit fly Drosophila melanogaster. In the Fly Room at Columbia University.

1902

- Ronald Ross gained Nobel Prize for Medicine for his discovery that malaria is carried by mosquitoes. The awarding committee made special mention of the work of Giovanni Battista Grassi on the life history of the Plasmodium parasite.
- Charles W. Woodworth A List of the Insects of California published.
- Philogene Auguste Galilee Wytsman started Genera Insectorum, a multi-authored series that consisted of 219 issues, the last occurring in 1970.
- Otto SchmiedeknechtOpuscula Ichneumonologica. Blankenburg.
- William Morton Wheeler appointed curator of invertebrate zoology in the American Museum of Natural History, New York
- August Arthur Petry publishes Ueber die deutschen an Artemisia lebenden Arten der Gattung Bucculatrix Z. nebst Beschreibung einer neuen Art in Deutsche entomologische Zeitschrift Iris
- Peter Esben-Petersen publishes Bidrag til en Fortegnelse over Arktisk Norges Neuropterfauna
- Last sighting of Rocky Mountain locust
- Initiation of Hopkins Notes and Records System at the USDA

1905

- Adolfo Lutz Beitraege zur Kenntniss der brasilianischen Tabaniden. Rev. Soc. Sci. São Paulo 1: 19–32, published
- Raphaël Blanchard Les moustiques. Histoire naturelle et médicale Paris, F.R. de Rudeval, published.
- Gabriel Höfner Die Schmetterlinge Kärntens (1905-1915)

1906

- Adalbert Seitz, Gross-Schmetterlinge der Erde commenced. This vast work on Lepidoptera was published in German, English and French. It contained colour plates of all important species.

1907

- William Lundbeck Diptera Danica. Genera and species of flies Hitherto found in Denmark commenced.
- Hamilton Herbert Druce On Neotropical Lycaenidae, with Descriptions of New Species. Proceedings of the Zoological Society of London.
- Henry Christopher McCook Nature's Craftsmen: Popular Studies of Ants and Other Insects.
- Lajos Abafi Magyarország lepkéi (butterflies of Hungary) 1907

1908

- Edmund Reitter Fauna Germanica - Die Käfer des Deutschen Reiches commenced. This five volume masterwork remains in use today, almost 100 years from its inception.
- Leonello Picco Contributo allo studio della fauna entomologica Italiano. Elenco sistematico degli Emitteri finora raccolti nella Provincia di Roma.
- Arnold Spuler and Ernst Hofmann Die Schmetterlinge Europas (The Lepidoptera of Europe) was for decades a standard in the study of lepidoptera.

1909

- George Henry Verrall Stratiomyidae and succeeding families of the Diptera Brachycera of Great Britain - British flies published.
- Carlos Chagas observed the peculiar infestation of rural houses in Brazil with Triatoma, a "kissing" bug, later demonstrating that it was the vector of Trypanosoma cruzi, and he was able to prove experimentally that it could be transmitted to marmoset monkeys that were bitten by the infected bug. His description of the new disease was to become a classic in medicine and brought him domestic and international distinction.
- Charles Nicolle reasoned that it was most likely lice that were the vector for epidemic typhus. He tested his theory by infecting a chimpanzee with typhus, retrieving the lice from it, and placing it on a healthy chimpanzee. Within 10 days the second chimpanzee had typhus as well.
- Antonio Berlese Volume I of Gli insetti loro organizzazione, sviluppo, abitudini e rapporti con l'uomo (Volume 2 1925).
- Arnold Pagenstecher Die geographische Verbreitung der Schmetterlinge published in Jena.
- Foundation of Journal of Entomology by Charles Fuller Baker, one of the first revues of economic entomology.
- Murinus Cornelius Piepers, Pieter Cornelius Tobias Snellen and Hans Fruhstorfer. The Rhopalocera of Java commenced. Completed 1918.

1910

- Gilbert John Arrow published the first volume of The Fauna of British India, Including Ceylon and Burma. Lamellicornia 1. Cetoniinae and Dynastinae. Arrow wrote five volumes of this classic work.
- Hans Ferdinand Emil Julius Stichel Lepidoptera Rhopalocera. Fam. Riodinidae. published in J. Wytsman Genera Insectorum 112A completed 1911).
- Hans Fruhstorfer published Family Pieridae in Adalbert Seitz's Macrolepidoptera of the World
- Thomas Hunt Morgan begins using Drosophila melanogaster as a model organism for genetics studies

1912

- Per Olof Christopher Aurivillius wrote Part 39 of Catalogus Coleopterorum Cerambycidae: Cerambycinae (1912). Aurivillius worked on world insects.

1913

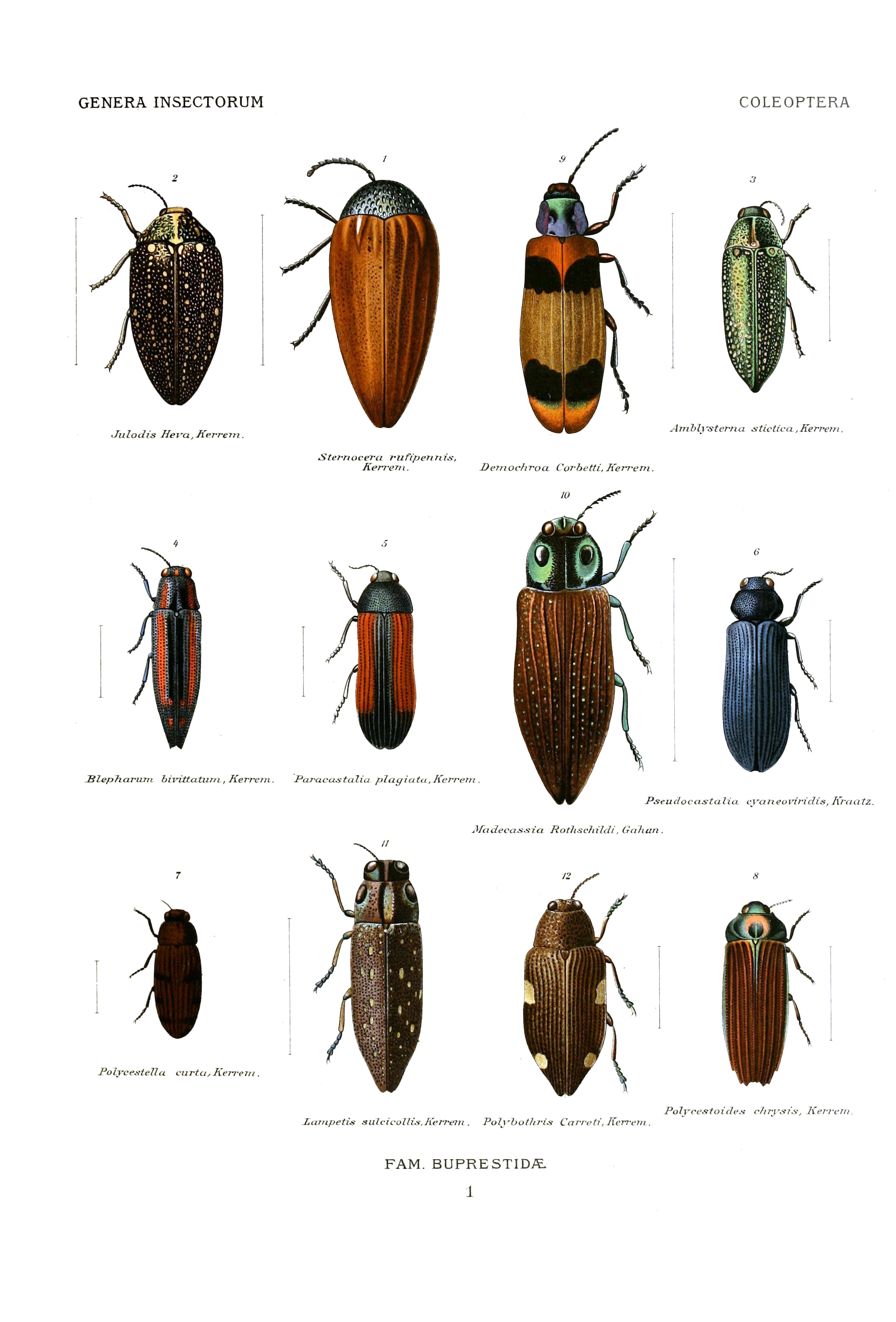
Plate from Wytsman.Genera.Insectorum.Buprestidae

- Charles Paul Alexander A synopsis of part of the Neotropical Crane-flies of the subfamily Limnobinae (Tipulidae).
- Erwin Lindner joined the State Museum of Natural History Stuttgart.
- Otto Kröber Therevidae.Genera.Ins published.
- Karl Eckstein Die Schmetterlinge Deutschlands mit besonderer Berücksichtigung der Biologie commenced (finished 1933).
- G.D. Hale Carpenter joined the London School of Hygiene and Tropical Medicine, and took the Doctor of Medicine examination in 1913 with a dissertation on the tsetse fly (Glossina palpalis) and sleeping sickness.

1914

- Friedrich Georg Hendel Die Arten der Platystominen. Abh. Zool.-Bot. Ges. Wien 8 (1): 1–409, 4 pls. published
- Filippo Silvestri Contribuzione alla conoscenza dei Termitidi e Termitofili dell'Africa occidentale. Bollettino del Laboratorio di Zoologia General e Agraria, Portici.

1915

- Nathan Banks A Treatise on the Acarina, Or Mites the first comprehensive English handbook on mites.
- Reginald Punnett publishes Mimicry in Butterflies.
- Ottoman Syria locust plague in the Levant.

1916

- The Japanese beetle, Popillia japonica, was first discovered in the United States in Riverton, New Jersey during mid-August 1916.

1919

- Boll Weevil Monument erected in Enterprise, Alabama

1920

- Alfred Kinsey became Professor of Entomology at Indiana University Bloomington.
- Ernst Jünger publishes In Stahlgewittern, The Storm of Steel.
- Enrico Adelelmo Brunetti The Fauna of British India, Including Ceylon and Burma. Diptera 1. Brachycera published.
- Charles Thomas Brues Insects and Human Welfare published.
- G.D. Hale Carpenter published: A Naturalist on Lake Victoria, with an Account of Sleeping Sickness and the Tse-tse Fly; 1920. T.F. Unwin Ltd, London; Biodiversity Archive

1921

- Günther Enderlein Über die phyletisch älteren Stratiomyiidensubfamilien (Xylophaginae, Chiromyzinae, Solvinae, Beridinae und Coenomyiinae). Mitt. Zool. Mus. Berl. 10: 150-214 published.

1923

- Auguste-Henri Forel publishes a myrmecological 5-volume magnum opus, Le Monde Social des Forimis

1924

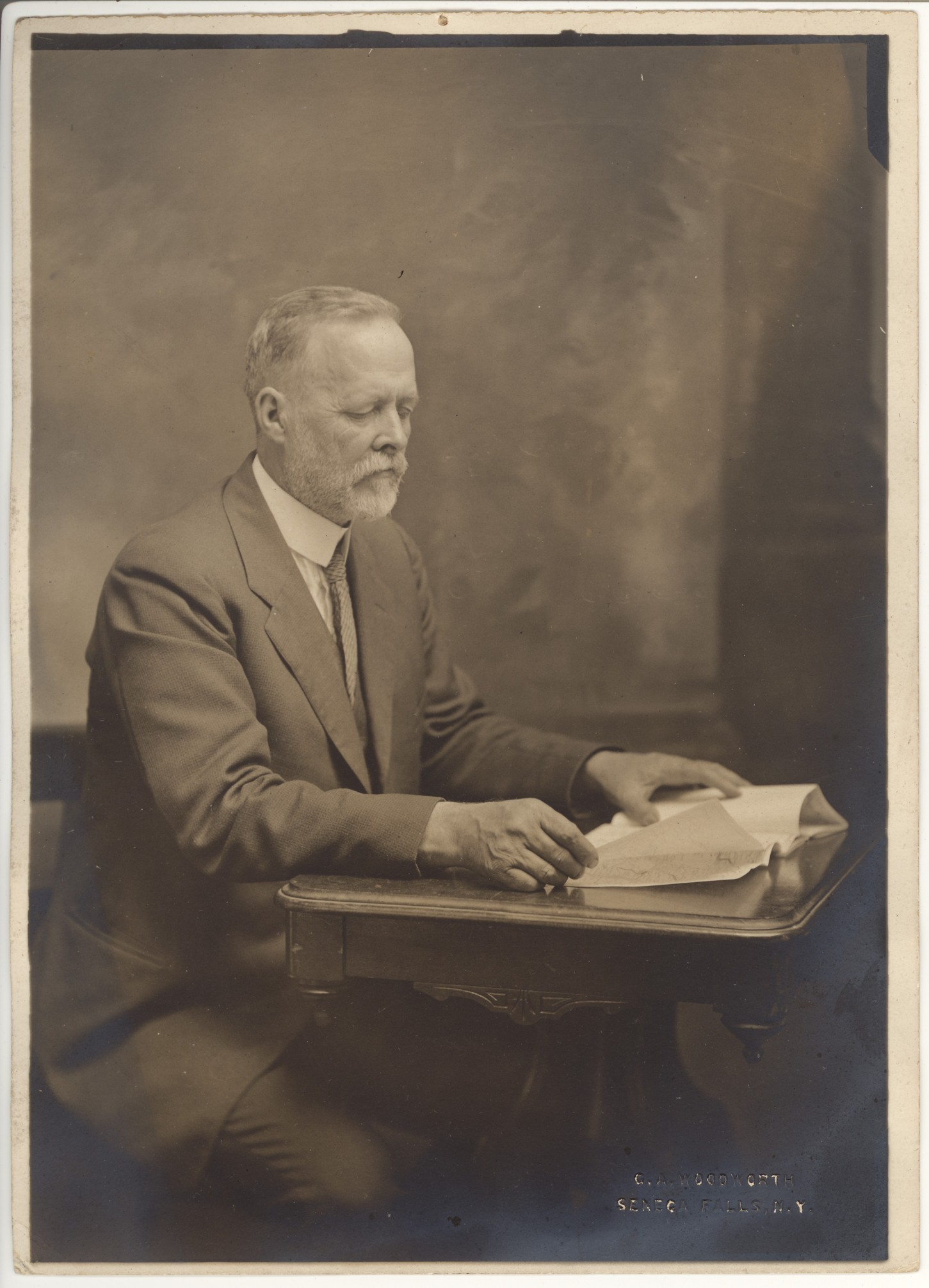
Charles W. Woodworth.

- Frederick William Frohawk's Natural History of British Butterflies published.

1925

- Frank M. Carpenter begins work on the Elmo Permian fossil fauna.
- Josef Fahringer Opuscula braconolocica (4 parts, finished 1937) begun.

1927

- Ronald A. Senior-White and Robert Knowles (entomologist) Malaria: Its Investigation and Control, with Special Reference to Indian Conditions. Calcutta: Thacker, Spink and Co published.
- José María Hugo de la Fuente Morales Tablas analíticas para la clasificación de los coleópteros de la Península Ibérica. Barcelona Imprenta Altés, published.
- Zeno Payne Metcalf commenced (as overall editor and author of the Homoptera sections) General Catalogue of the Hemiptera. Completed 1971.

1928

- Jan Noskiewicz with G. Poluszynski Embryologische Untersuchungen an Strepsipteren. I. Teil: Embryogenesis der Gattung Stylops Kirby. Akad. Umiejetnosci..
- Leopold III of Belgium a keen amateur entomologist collects in the Dutch East Indies(1929-1929)
- Guido Grandi founded the Institute of Entomology at the University of Bologna (l'Istituto di Entomologia dell'Università di Bologna).
- Fossil that is sometimes considered as oldest known insect, Rhyniognatha hirsti named by Robert John Tillyard.
- Alexander Kirilow Drenowski The Lepidoptera fauna on the high mountains of Bulgaria Sbornik bulg. Akad. Nauk. 23: 1–120, 1 map, published.

1930

- Camillo Acqua Il bombice del Gelso:Nello stato normale e patologico nella tecnica dell'allevamento e della riproduzione. (Industria della preparazione del seme Bachi)-Enc. tela. Casa Ed. di Giuseppe Cesari, published. This was an important contribution to the literature on sericulture.

1931

- Georg Hermann Alexander Ochs publishes Über die Gyriniden-Ausbeute der Deutschen Limnologischen Sunda-Expedition mit einer Übersicht über die Gyriniden-Fauna Javas und Larvenbeschreibungen.
- Shonen Matsumura 6,000 illustrated Insects of Japan-Empire.

1932

- A Practical Handbook of British Beetles by Norman H. Joy published by Witherby.
- Alfred Balachowsky Étude biologique des coccides du bassin occidental de la Méditerranée published in Paris by Lechevalier and Fils.

1934

- René Malaise invents the Malaise trap.
- Vincent Brian Wigglesworth, the "Father" of Insect Physiology, writes the first book on insect physiology, The Principles of Insect Physiology.
- Antoni Władysław Jakubski Czerwiec polski "Polish cochineal". Monograph on the Polish cochineal.

1935

- Gerhard Schrader discovers the powerful insecticides called organophosphates
- Walter Rothschild gives his insect collection, one of the world's largest collections of Lepidoptera, to the Natural History Museum.

1936

- The Natural History Museum, London acquires the James John Joicey collection of Lepidoptera.

1938

- Lucien Chopard La biologie des orthoptères (Paul Lechevalier, Paris).
- Ângelo Moreira da Costa Lima commenced Insetos do Brasil, v. 1-11. Completed 1960.

1940

- Vladimir Nabokov begins organizing the butterfly collection of the Museum of Comparative Zoology at Harvard University.
- Ruggero Verity commenced Farfalle, in English Butterflies, of Italia (five volumes, 1940–1953).
- René Jeannel Faune cavernicole de la France, in English The Fauna of the Caves of France, published.
- Japanese army drops plague-infested flea bombs in Zhejiang, China

1941

- Zoltán Szilády A magyar birodalom legyeinek szinopszisa. VI. Talpaslegyek, Clythidae (Platypezidae); VIII. Lauxaniidae [Synopsis of the flies of the Hungarian empire].
- Adolf Horion Faunistik der Mitteleuropäischen Käfer commenced. Completed 1974.

1942

- Woodhouse, L. G. O. & George Morrison Reid Henry. The Butterfly Fauna of Ceylon. Government Record Office, Colombo
- Ernest Gibbins killed in Uganda by tribesmen.

1943

- André Badonnel Faune de France. Psocoptères. Paris. Paul Lechevalier 1943.
- Leopold Fulmek Wirtsindex der Aleyrodiden- und Cocciden- Parasiten Entomologische Beihefte 10: 1–100.

1944

- Enrica Calabresi commits suicide in Florence.
- Vladimir Nabokov describes the Karner blue.

1945

- Edmund Brisco Ford Butterflies published, seminal introduction to the study of butterflies and their genetics.
- Cynthia Longfield The Odonata of South Angola. Arquivos do Museu Bocage, 16, Lisboa.

1946

- Institut National de la Recherche Agronomique founded.

1947

- Carlo Alonza became director of the Muséum de Gênes.
- Launch of National Malaria Eradication Program in the U.S.

1949

- Pierre-Paul Grassé ed. Traité de Zoologie Tome IX. Insectes. Paris, 1949. 1118 p.

1950

- Maynard Jack Ramsay becomes Port Entomologist on Staten Island.
- Mahadeva Subramania Mani founded the School of Entomology at Agra, India.

1951

- Work on sterile insect technique begun by American entomologists Raymond Bushland and Edward Knipling. For their achievement, they jointly received the 1992 World Food Prize.
- Sakae Tamura Konchū no seitai: Raika shashinshū (昆虫の生態：ライカ写眞集) or Closeups on Insects. Tokyo: Seibundo-Shinkosha
- Torkel Weis-Fogh pioneered studies of insect flight with August Krogh.
- Founding of Xerces Society

1952

- Bernard Kettlewell begins research into the influence of industrial melanism on natural selection in moths.
- Crodowaldo Pavan introduced into biology the cytogenetical study of Rhynchosciara americana.

1953

- Willi Hennig publishes Grundzüge einer Theorie der phylogenetischen Systematikin Berlin. This was followed by Kritische Bemerkungen zum phylogenetischen System der Insekten in 1953 and Phylogenetic Systematics in 1966. In these works, Hennig founded cladistics.
- Sydney Skaife African Insect Life published.
- Catalogue illustré des lucanides du globe in Encyclopédie Entomologique (series A 27: 1-223) by Robert Didier and Eugene Seguy published.
- First peppered moth evolution experiment in Birmingham by Bernard Kettlewell

1954

- Grigorij Jakovlevitsch Bey-Bienko Insecta: Orthoptera: Tettigoniidae: Phaneropterinae. Fauna SSSR.
- Operation Big Itch takes place in Utah

1955

- World programme for malaria eradication begins. Finally abandoned 1969.
- Roy Albert Crowson's The natural classification of the families of Coleoptera is published. This is a classic monograph.
- Alexey Diakonoff Microlepidoptera of New Guinea. Results of the third Archbold Expedition (American- Netherlands Indian Expedition 1938-1939). Part V. Verhandelingen der Koninklijke Nederlandse published 15 years after the expedition.
- Operation Big Buzz takes place in Georgia

1957

Clodoveo Carrión Mora in 1925

- Clodoveo Carrión Mora dies in Ecuador. Mora was a leading figure entomology of 20th-century entomology in South America.

1958

- Four Pests Campaign launched in China targeting mosquitos, flies and later bed bugs in 1960

1960

- Czesław Bieżanko publishes Álbum iconográfico dos Lepidópteros coletados por Biezanko. Papilionidae.
- Marta Grandi Ephemeroidea. Fauna d'Italia
- End of third plague pandemic

1961

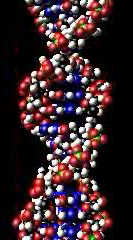
Space-filling model of a section of DNA molecule.

- Genetic code is cracked. DNA was discovered by Friedrich Miescher in 1868, recognized as the bearer of genetic information in 1943 and revealed as a double helix by Rosalind Franklin in 1952. This leads to radical revision of the higher taxonomy of the Insecta.

1964

- Morris Rockstein's edited series — 3 vols. — The Physiology of Insecta
- Takashi Shirozu Butterflies of Japan Illustrated in Colour published in Tokyo by Hokuryu-kan.

1965

- Nikolai Sergeevich Borchsenius Essay on the classification of the armoured scale insects (Homoptera, Coccoidea, Diaspididae). (In Russian.) Entomologicheskoe Obozrenye 44: 208–214.

1966

- First international Red Lists of endangered species were published.
- Cochliomyia hominivorax New World screwfly declared extinct in the U.S.

1967

- Richard E. Blackwelder Taxonomy: a Text and Reference Book John. Wiley and Sons, New York, published.

1968

- David Allan Young Taxonomic Study of the Cicadellinae (Homoptera: Cicadellidae) commenced. Finished 1986.

1969

- Reg Chapman's textbook appears — The Insects-Structure and Function. American Elsevier, N.Y.
- International Centre of Insect Physiology and Ecology established.

1971

- Maximilian Fischer Index of Entomophagous Insects. Le Francois, Paris.

1973

- Karl von Frisch awarded Nobel Prize for pioneering work on insect behaviour.
- Warwick Estevam Kerr Evolution of the population structure in bees. Genetics 79: 73–84.

1976

- Anastase Alfieri The Coleoptera of Egypt published.
- First observation of fog basking in Onymacris unguicularis

1978

- First full-scale boll weevil eradication trial in the U.S. as part of Boll Weevil Eradication Program

1981

- Robert Michael Pyle published The National Audubon Society Field Guide to North American Butterflies. Knopf.

1981

- CESA Centre for Entomological Studies Ankara An international private research centre and museum on Entomology established by Ahmet Omer Kocak in Ankara, Turkey.

1983

- Introduction of MONA number

1984

- Árpád Soós and Lazlo Papp begin editing Catalogue of Palaearctic Diptera.1984 - 1992.
- Justin O. Schmidt publishes first paper on the Schmidt Sting Pain Index.
- First edition of The Colour Identification Guide to Moths of the British Isles by Bernard Skinner

1985

- Murray S. Blum Fundamentals of Insect Physiology. New York: Wiley, 1985.
- Gerald A. Kerkut and L. I. Gilbert Comprehensive Insect Physiology, Biochemistry & Pharmacology.

1987

- Stephen Taber III Breeding Super Bee. Ohio: AI Root Co, 1987.

1989

- Forensic entomologist Mark Benecke joins the punk rock band "Die Blonden Burschen", The Blonde Boys. Many past entomologists were also musical.
- California medfly attack takes place (notable case of bioterrorism and ecoterrorism)

1990

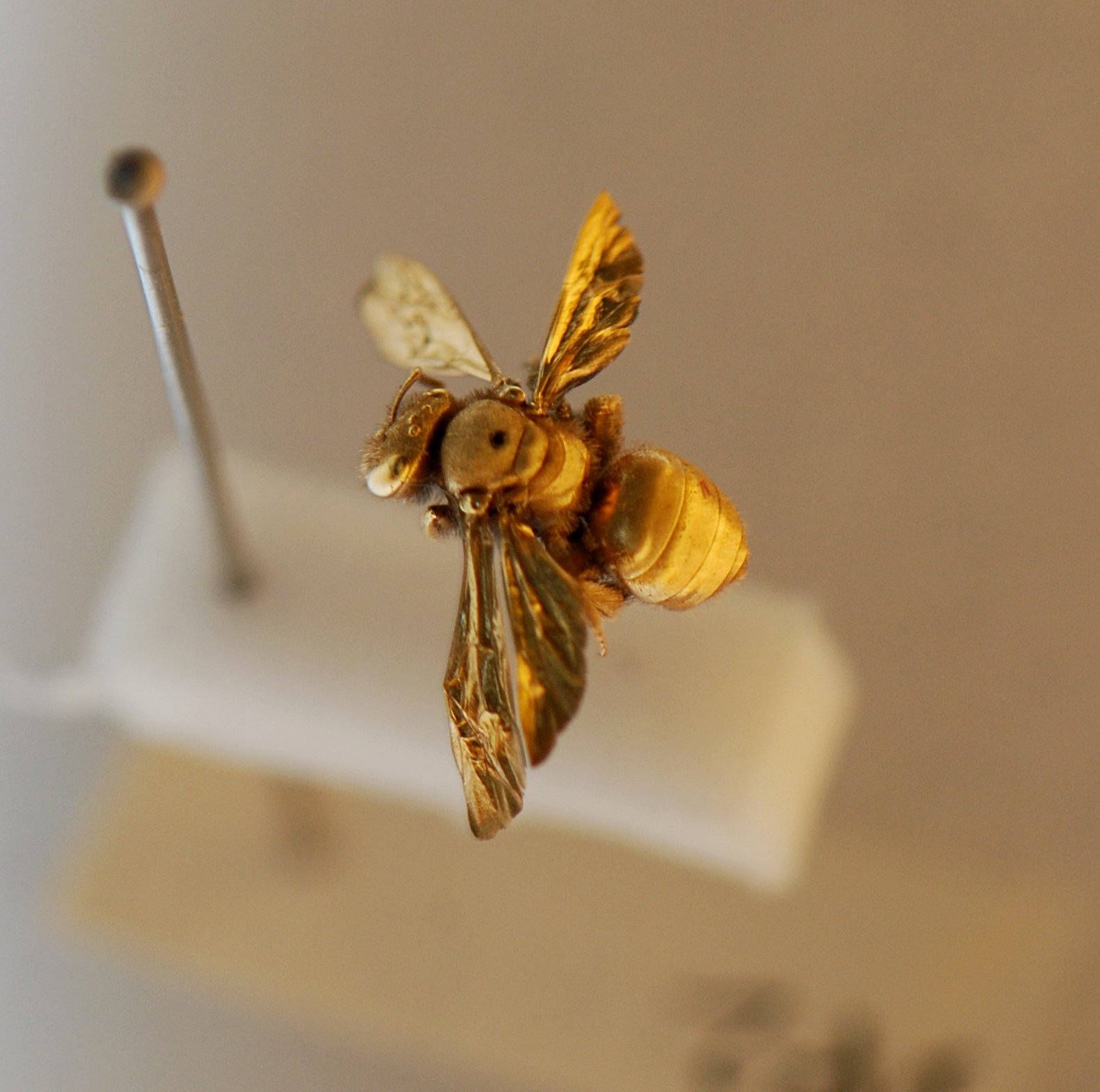
An insect coated in gold, having been prepared for viewing with a scanning electron microscope.

- Bert Hölldobler and E. O. Wilson publish The Ants. The following year, it will be the only entomology textbook to win the Pulitzer Prize for non-fiction.
- Low cost Scanning electron microscope came into general use

1991

- Naumann, I. D., P. B. Carne, J. F. Lawrence, E. S. Nielsen, J. P. Spradberry, R. W. Taylor, M. J. Whitten and M. J. Littlejohn, eds. The Insects of Australia: A Textbook for Students and Research Workers. Volume I and II. Second Edition. Carlton, Victoria, Melbourne University Press.

1992

- DNA extraction from weevil fossilized in Lebanese amber by team including George Poinar Jr.
- Establishment of Monarch Grove Sanctuary and North American Butterfly Association

1993

- Edward Grumbine, Ghost Bears: Exploring the Biodiversity Crisis reflects growing concerns. Insects are major indicators of environmental destruction and impending mass extinction.

1994

- Hoy, M. Insect molecular genetics. An introduction to principles and applications.
- Vladimir Nikolayevich Beklemishev Методология систематики (Methodology of systematics).KMK Scientific Press Ltd.
- Journey to the Ants by Bert Hölldobler and Edward O. Wilson.

1995

- Yuri Petrovich Korshunov and Pavel Yunievich Gorbunov Butterflies of the Urals, Siberia and Far East published.

1996

- Microcosmos released in France.

1997

- Perry Adkisson receives World Food Prize for his work on Integrated Pest Management.

1998

- Paul R. Ehrlich publishes Betrayal of Science and Reason: How Anti-Environment Rhetoric Threatens Our Future (1998, co-authored with his wife)
- Phylocode proposed following a meeting at Harvard University.

1999

- Ebbe Schmidt Nielsen instrumental in setting up the Global Biodiversity Information Facility
- Introduction of West Nile virus in the U.S.

2000

- Loïc Matile Diptères d'Europe Occidentale Tomes 1 and 2 Atlas d'Entomologie.Editions N. Boubée.Paris.
- Maggots, Murder and Men by Zakaria Erzinçlioğlu
- The Bees of the World by Charles Duncan Michener
- Sequencing of Drosophila melanogaster genome

2001

- First volume of American Beetles published. Ross H. Arnett, Jr. and Michael C. Thomas.
- Rediscovery of the Lord Howe stick insect, last seen in 1920

2002

- Alex Rasnitsyn with D.L.J. Quicke History of Insects. Kluwer Academic Publishers.
- Founding of Oxitec Insect Technologies in the U.K.
- Launch of AntWeb by Brian Fisher

2003

- Launch of BugGuide

2004

- Gilbert, L.I. (ed.). 2004. Comprehensive molecular insect science, 7 vols. Elsevier Pergamon, published in St. Louis
- A paper in Science found that Culex pipiens mosquitoes existed in two populations in Europe, one which bites birds and one which bites humans. In North America 40% of Culex pipiens were found to be hybrids of the two types which bite both birds and humans, providing a vector for West Nile virus. This is thought to provide an explanation of why the West Nile disease has spread more quickly in North America than Europe.
- Discovery of Kakugo virus in worker honeybees
- Launch of Tephritid Workers Database

2005

- The Insect Biocontrol Laboratory at the Henry A. Wallace Beltsville Agricultural Research Center in the United States develops DNA fingerprinting tools that match hard-to-identify larvae to adults that have been positively identified.
- Michael S. Engel and David Grimaldi Evolution of the Insects published.
- Launch of DNA barcoding database Barcode of Life Data System

2007

- Colony collapse disorder first formally named

2009

- Photograph of "Venezuelan poodle moth" (most likely Artace sp.) goes viral
- Beetle Queen Conquers Tokyo documentary released

2012

- Launch of eButterfly

2014

- First documentation of spotted lanternfly in the U.S.

2017

- Erica McAlister publishes The Secret Life of Flies

2018

- Discovery of Xenomorphia wasp fossils in France

2022

- Endless Forms published by Seirian Sumner

2025

- Discovery of Acrophylla alta stick insect in Australia
- First human case of travel-associated New World screwworm fly infection in Maryland in over 50 years.

== See also ==
- List of entomologists
- Timeline of entomology — for a list of other available time periods
