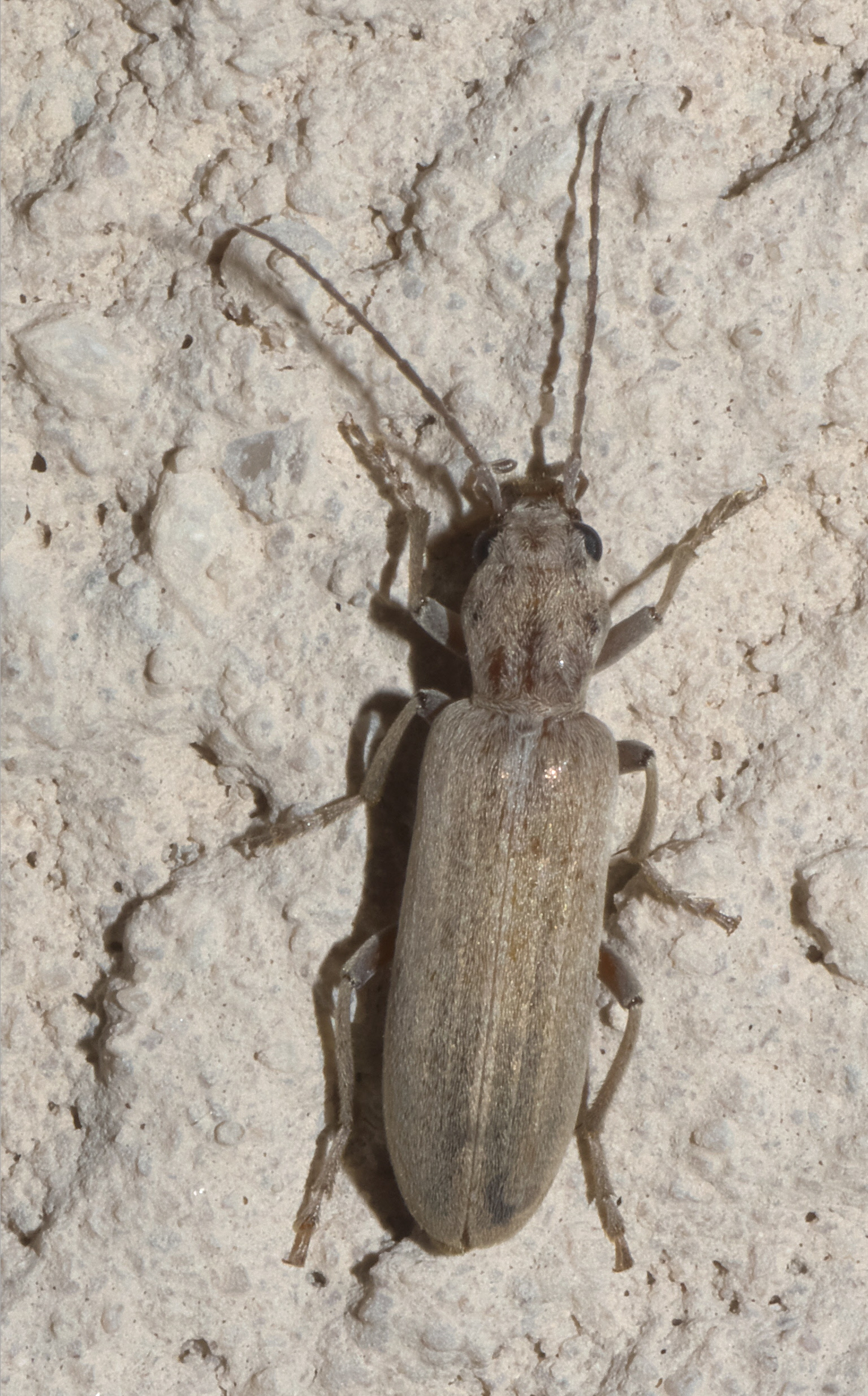
- Oxacis pallida

Scientific classification
- Domain: Eukaryota
- Kingdom: Animalia
- Phylum: Arthropoda
- Class: Insecta
- Order: Coleoptera
- Suborder: Polyphaga
- Infraorder: Cucujiformia
- Family: Oedemeridae
- Tribe: Asclerini
- Genus: Oxacis; LeConte, 1866

= Oxacis =

Genus of false blister beetles

Oxacis is a genus of false blister beetles in the family Oedemeridae. There are at least 30 described species in Oxacis.

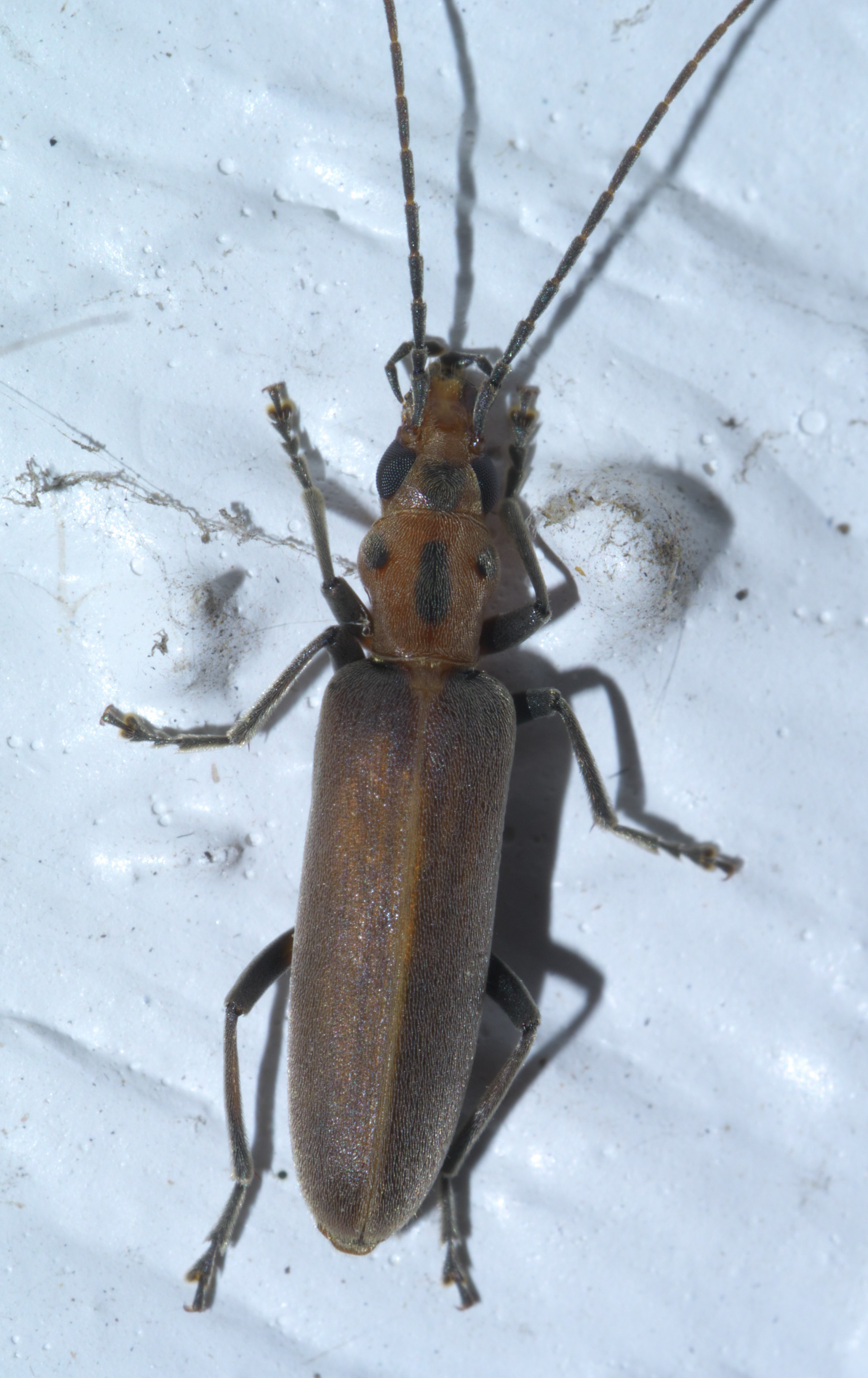
Oxacis trirossi

== Species ==
These 30 species belong to the genus Oxacis:

- Oxacis angustata Champion, 1890
- Oxacis barbara Arnett, 1956
- Oxacis bernadettei Arnett, 1963
- Oxacis bernatettei Arnett, 1963
- Oxacis bitomentosa Arnett, 1960
- Oxacis caerulea Champion, 1890 (blue oedemerid)
- Oxacis cana (LeConte, 1854)
- Oxacis coahuilae Champion, 1890
- Oxacis dugesi Champion, 1890
- Oxacis fragilis Horn, 1896
- Oxacis francesca Arnett, 1963
- Oxacis granulata LeConte, 1866
- Oxacis josephi Arnett, 1963
- Oxacis laeta (Waterhouse, 1878)
- Oxacis laevicollis Horn, 1896
- Oxacis marianna Arnett, 1970
- Oxacis megathoracica Arnett, 1960
- Oxacis michaeli Arnett, 1963
- Oxacis minuta Champion, 1890
- Oxacis nitens Arnett, 1956
- Oxacis nitidicollis Champion, 1890
- Oxacis pallida (LeConte, 1854)
- Oxacis plumbea Champion, 1890
- Oxacis rugicollis Champion, 1890
- Oxacis sericea Horn, 1870
- Oxacis subfusca Horn, 1896
- Oxacis taeniata (LeConte, 1854)
- Oxacis trimaculata Champion, 1890 (false blister beetle)
- Oxacis trirossi Arnett, 1964
- Oxacis xerensis Arnett, 1960
