= Oxacis cana =

Scientific classification
- Domain: Eukaryota
- Kingdom: Animalia
- Phylum: Arthropoda
- Class: Insecta
- Order: Coleoptera
- Suborder: Polyphaga
- Infraorder: Cucujiformia
- Family: Oedemeridae
- Genus: Oxacis
- Species: O. cana

Binomial name
- Oxacis cana (LeConte, 1854)

Species of beetle

Oxacis cana is a species of false blister beetle in the family Oedemeridae. It is found in Central America and North America.
