= Holdridge life zones =

Global bioclimatic scheme for the classification of land areas

Holdridge life zone classification scheme. Although conceived as three-dimensional by its originator, it is usually shown as a two-dimensional array of hexagons in a triangular frame.

The Holdridge life zones system is a global bioclimatic scheme for the classification of land areas. It was first published by Leslie Holdridge in 1947, and updated in 1967. It is a relatively simple system based on few empirical data, giving objective criteria. A basic assumption of the system is that both soil and the climax vegetation can be mapped once the climate is known.

== Scheme ==
While it was first designed for tropical and subtropical areas, the system now applies globally. The system has been shown to fit not just tropical vegetation zones, but Mediterranean zones, and boreal zones too, but is less applicable to cold oceanic or cold arid climates where moisture becomes the predominant factor. The system has found a major use in assessing the potential changes in natural vegetation patterns due to global warming.

The three major axes of the barycentric subdivisions are:

- precipitation (annual, logarithmic)
- biotemperature (mean annual, logarithmic)
- potential evapotranspiration ratio (PET) to mean total annual precipitation.

Further indicators incorporated into the system are:

- humidity provinces
- latitudinal regions
- altitudinal belts

Biotemperature is based on the growing season length and temperature. It is measured as the mean of all annual temperatures, with all temperatures below freezing and above 30 °C adjusted to 0 °C, as most plants are dormant at these temperatures. Holdridge's system uses biotemperature first, rather than the temperate latitude bias of Merriam's life zones, and does not primarily consider elevation directly. The system is considered more appropriate for tropical vegetation than Merriam's system.

== Scientific relationship between the 3 axes and 3 indicators ==
Potential evapotranspiration (PET) is the amount of water that would be evaporated and transpired if there were enough water available. Higher temperatures result in higher PET. Evapotranspiration (ET) is the raw sum of evaporation and plant transpiration from the Earth's land surface to atmosphere. Evapotranspiration can never be greater than PET. The ratio, Precipitation/PET, is the aridity index (AI), with an AI<0.2 indicating arid/hyperarid, and AI<0.5 indicating dry.

The coldest regions have not much evapotranspiration nor precipitation as there is not enough heat to evaporate much water, hence polar deserts. In the warmer regions, there are deserts with maximum PET but low rainfall that make the soil even drier, and rain forests with low PET and maximum rainfall causing river systems to drain excess water into oceans.

== Classes ==
All the classes defined within the system, as used by the International Institute for Applied Systems Analysis (IIASA), are:

1. Polar desert
2. Subpolar dry tundra
3. Subpolar moist tundra
4. Subpolar wet tundra
5. Subpolar rain tundra
6. Boreal desert
7. Boreal dry scrub
8. Boreal moist forest
9. Boreal wet forest
10. Boreal rain forest
11. Cool temperate desert
12. Cool temperate desert scrub
13. Cool temperate steppe
14. Cool temperate moist forest
15. Cool temperate wet forest
16. Cool temperate rain forest
17. Warm temperate desert
18. Warm temperate desert scrub
19. Warm temperate thorn scrub
20. Warm temperate dry forest
21. Warm temperate moist forest
22. Warm temperate wet forest
23. Warm temperate rain forest
24. Subtropical desert
25. Subtropical desert scrub
26. Subtropical thorn woodland
27. Subtropical dry forest
28. Subtropical moist forest
29. Subtropical wet forest
30. Subtropical rain forest
31. Tropical desert
32. Tropical desert scrub
33. Tropical thorn woodland
34. Tropical very dry forest
35. Tropical dry forest
36. Tropical moist forest
37. Tropical wet forest
38. Tropical rain forest

== Climate change ==
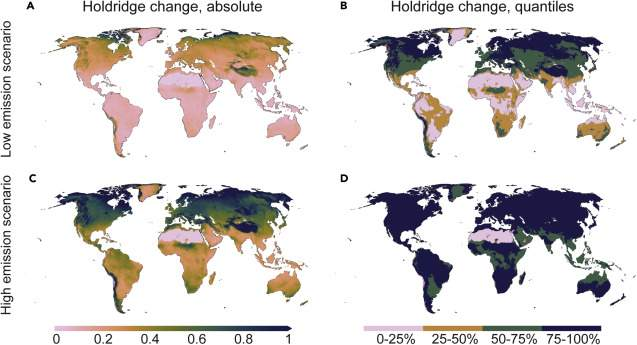
On this map, a shift of 1 indicates that at the end of the century, the region had fully moved into a completely different Holdridge zone type from where it had been historically. The extent of the shifts will be dependent on the severity of the climate change scenario followed.

Many areas of the globe are expected to see substantial changes in their Holdridge life zone type as the result of climate change, with more severe change resulting in more remarkable shifts in a geologically rapid time span, leaving less time for humans and biomes to adjust. If species fail to adapt to these changes, they would ultimately go extinct: the scale of future change also determines the extent of extinction risk from climate change.

For humanity, this phenomenon has particularly important implications for agriculture, as shifts in life zones happening in a matter of decades inherently result in unstable weather conditions compared to what that area had experienced throughout human history. Developed regions may be able to adjust to that, but those with fewer resources are less likely to do so.

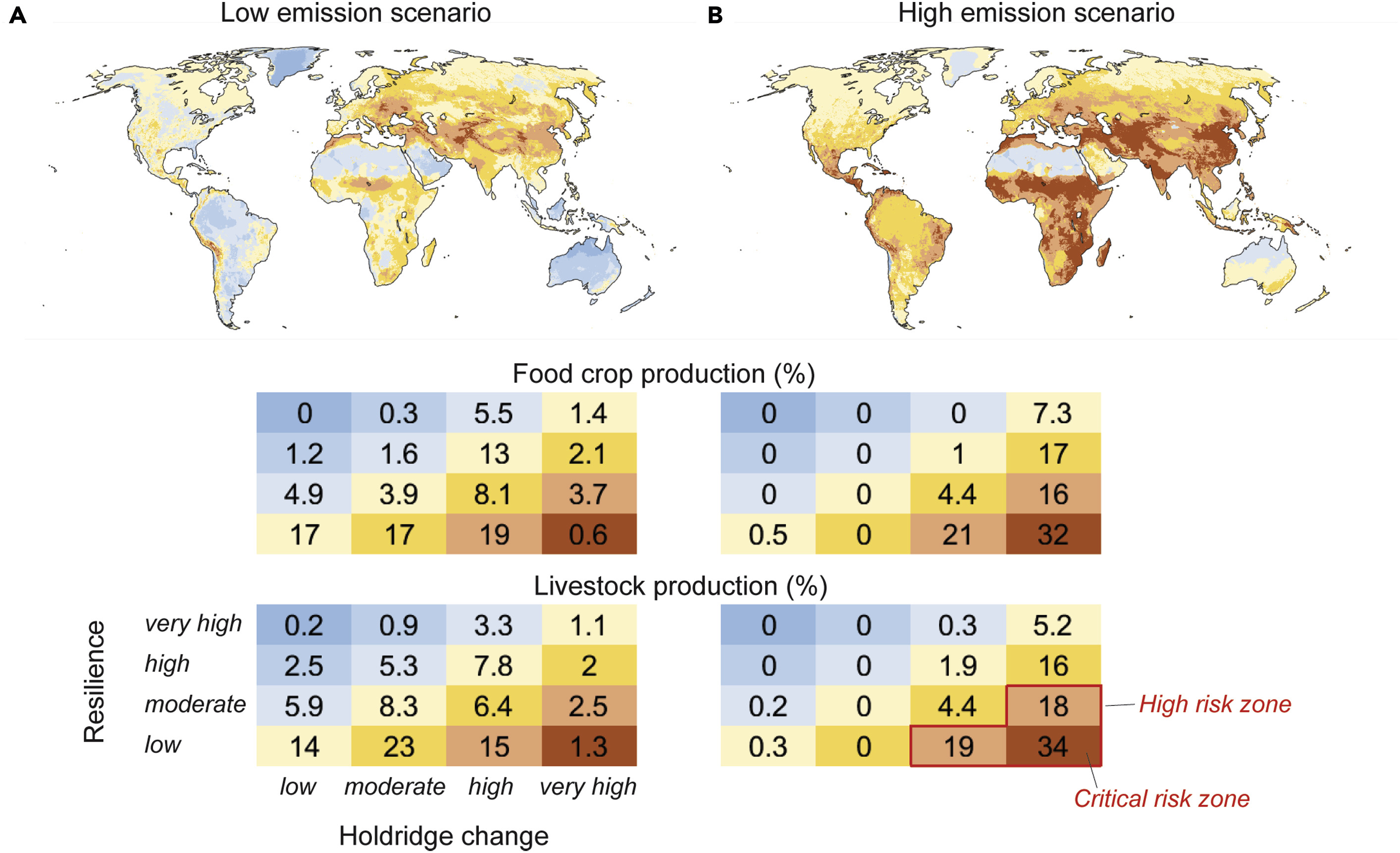
Areas of the globe where agriculture would become more difficult perhaps to the point of leaving the conditions historically suitable for it, under low-emission and high-emission scenarios, by 2100

Some research suggests that under the scenario of continually increasing greenhouse gas emissions, known as SSP5-8.5, the areas responsible for over half of the current crop and livestock output would experience very rapid shift in its Holdridge Life Zones. This includes most of South Asia and the Middle East, as well as parts of sub-Saharan Africa and Central America: unlike the more developed areas facing the same shift, it is suggested they would struggle to adapt due to limited social resilience, and so crop and livestock in those places would leave what the authors have defined as a "safe climatic space". On a global scale, that results in 31% of crop and 34% of livestock production being outside of the safe climatic space.

In contrast, under the low-emissions SSP1-2.6 (a scenario compatible with the less ambitious Paris Agreement goals, 5% and 8% of crop and livestock production would leave that safe climatic space.

== See also ==
- Andrew Delmar Hopkins
- Biome
- Ecoregion
- Köppen climate classification
- Life zone
- Trewartha climate classification
