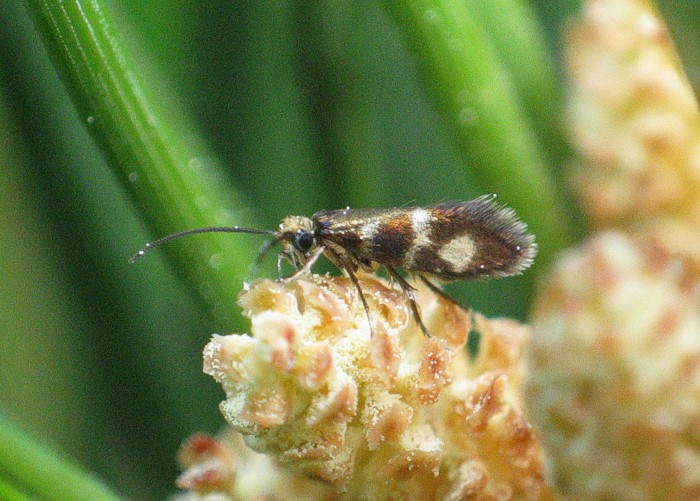

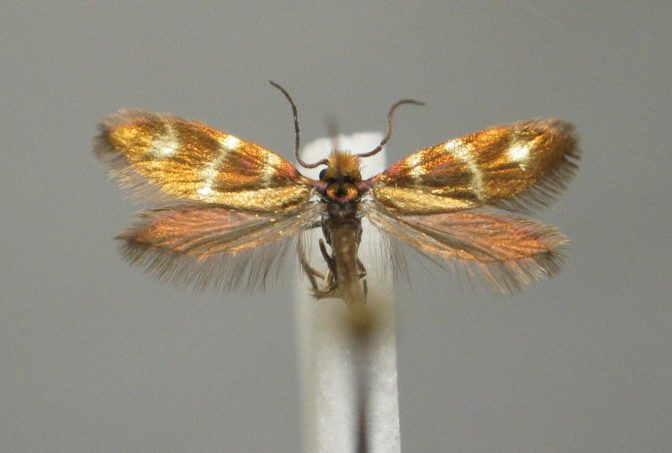

Scientific classification
- Kingdom: Animalia
- Phylum: Arthropoda
- Clade: Pancrustacea
- Class: Insecta
- Order: Lepidoptera
- Family: Micropterigidae
- Genus: Micropterix
- Species: M. aureoviridella

Binomial name
- Micropterix aureoviridella (Höfner, 1898)

Synonyms
- Eriocephala aureoviridella Höfner, 1898; Micropterix liogierella Réal, 1987

= Micropterix aureoviridella =

Species of moth

Micropterix aureoviridella is a moth of the family Micropterigidae found in Austria, Germany, Italy, Poland, Slovakia, Slovenia and Switzerland. It was first described by Gabriel Höfner in 1898.

The wingspan is about 7 millimetres (0.28 in). Adults are on wing from the end of May to July.

The adults feed on some shrubs, including Pinus mugo.
