= Elachista argentifasciella =

Scientific classification
- Domain: Eukaryota
- Kingdom: Animalia
- Phylum: Arthropoda
- Class: Insecta
- Order: Lepidoptera
- Family: Elachistidae
- Genus: Elachista
- Species: E. argentifasciella

Binomial name
- Elachista argentifasciella Höfner, 1898

Species of moth

Elachista argentifasciella is a moth of the family Elachistidae. It is found in Italy, Switzerland and Austria.
