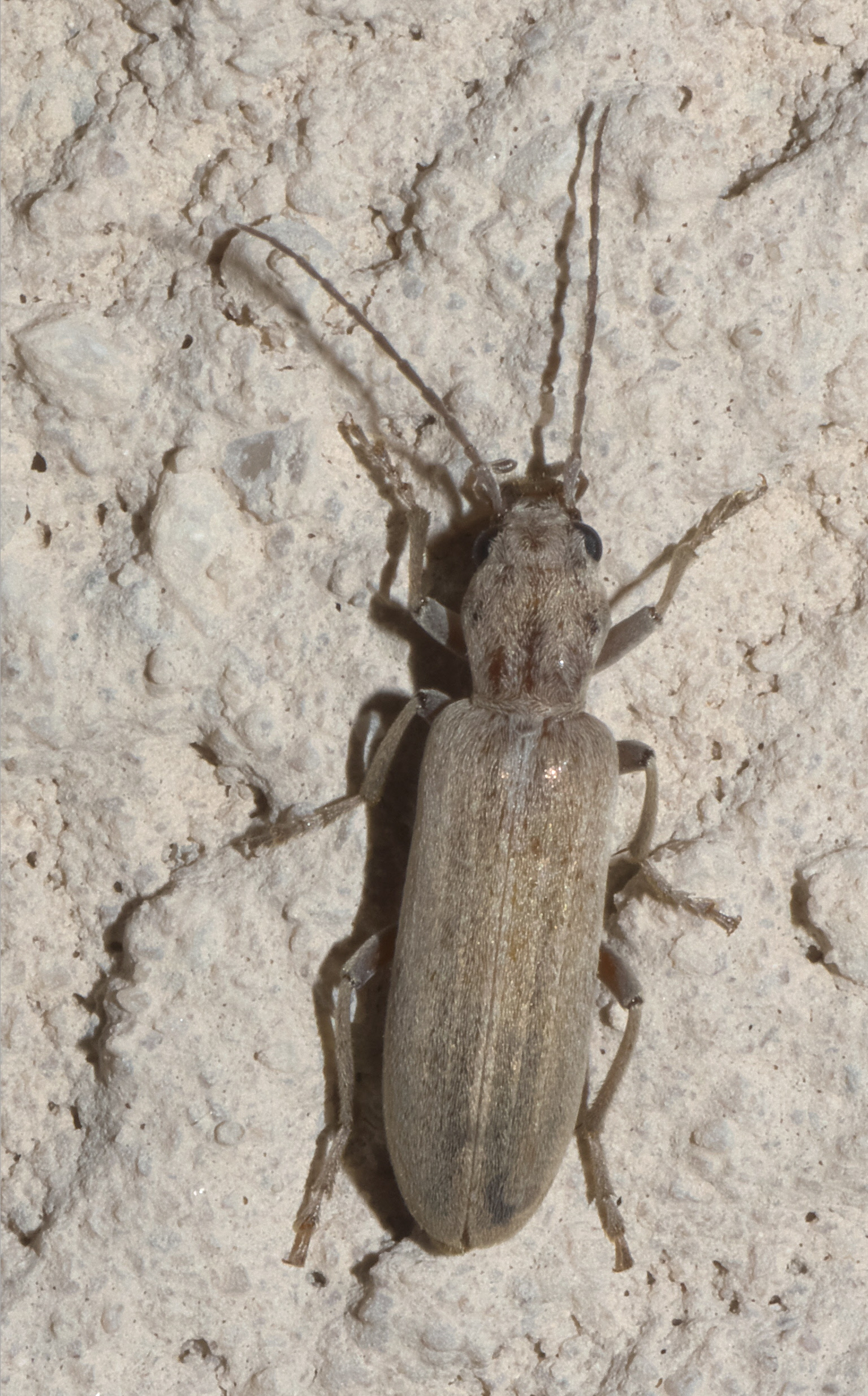

Scientific classification
- Domain: Eukaryota
- Kingdom: Animalia
- Phylum: Arthropoda
- Class: Insecta
- Order: Coleoptera
- Suborder: Polyphaga
- Infraorder: Cucujiformia
- Family: Oedemeridae
- Genus: Oxacis
- Species: O. pallida

Binomial name
- Oxacis pallida (LeConte, 1854)

= Oxacis pallida =

Species of beetle

Oxacis pallida is a species of false blister beetle in the family Oedemeridae. It is found in Central America and North America.

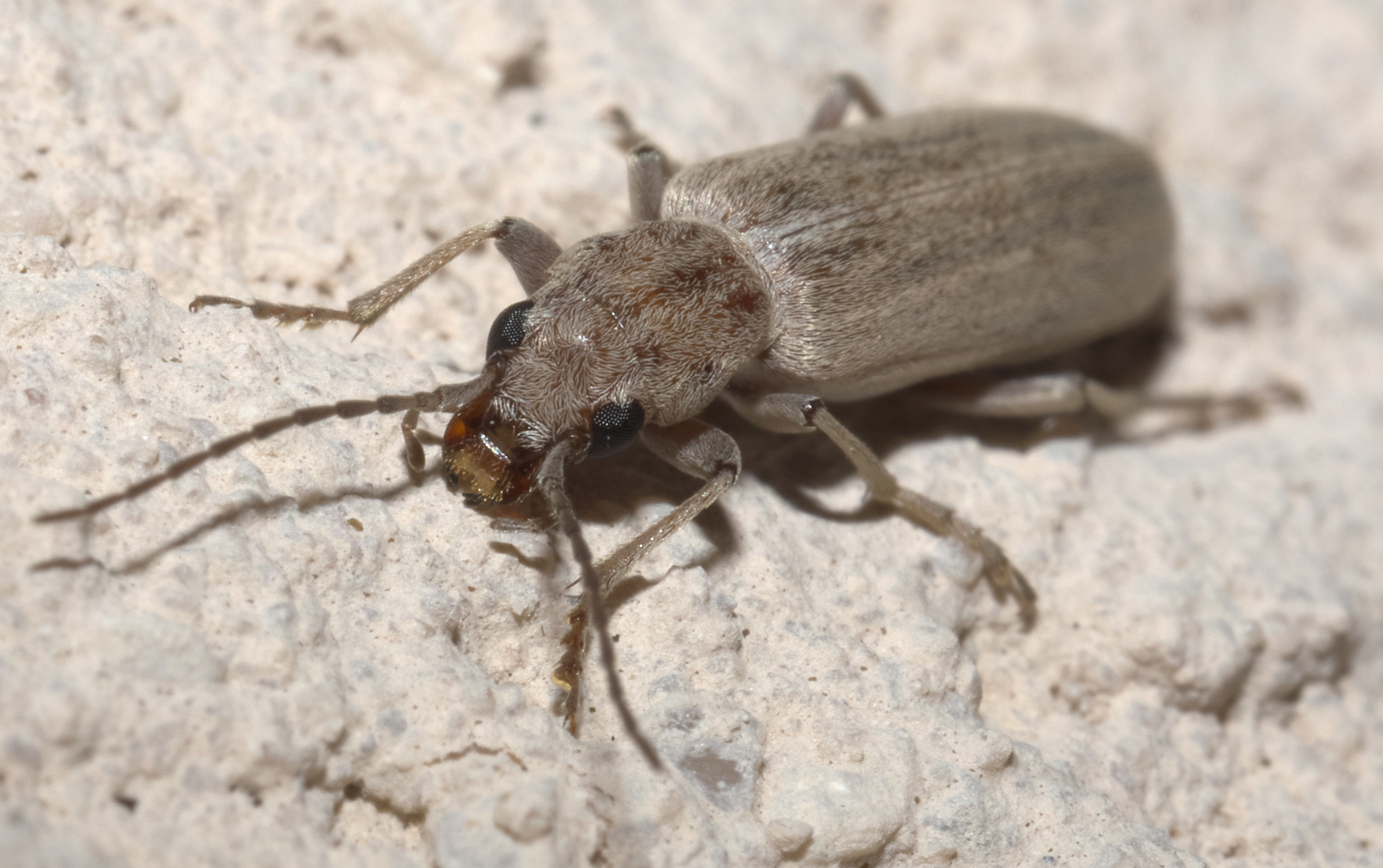
