= Lichtenberg Medal =

Highest award of Göttingen Academy of Sciences and Humanities

The Lichtenberg Medal (German: Lichtenberg-Medaille) is the highest award of the Göttingen Academy of Sciences and Humanities. It was established in memory of the Göttingen scholar Georg Christoph Lichtenberg. It has been awarded since 2004 (every two years since 2015) to "outstanding scientists who are respected by the public". The winner receives a gold medal and a certificate.

The Academy selects the laureate on the recommendation of either the Mathematical-Physical or the Philological-Historical Class. The right of nomination changes between the two classes.

== Laureates ==
- 2004 Paul Kirchhof, former Federal Constitutional Court judge.
- 2005 Carl Djerassi, chemist and writer.
- 2006 Peter Bieri, professor of philosophy, novelist.
- 2007 Arnold Esch, historian and writer.
- 2008 Roald Hoffmann, chemist and Nobel Laureate in Chemistry.
- 2009 Christian Meier, ancient historian.
- 2010 Bert Hölldobler, behavioural scientist and sociobiologist.
- 2011 Antonio Pau, Spanish jurist and writer.
- 2012 Helmut Schwarz, German chemist.
- 2013 Joshua Rifkin, American musicologist.
- 2014 Lorraine Daston, American science historian.
- 2015 Dieter Grimm, German jurist.
- 2017 James G. Anderson, American climatologist.
- 2019 Andrea Wulf, German-British cultural and economic historian.
- 2022 Douglas R. Hofstadter
- 2023 Carlo Masala
- 2025 Matthias Tschöp
