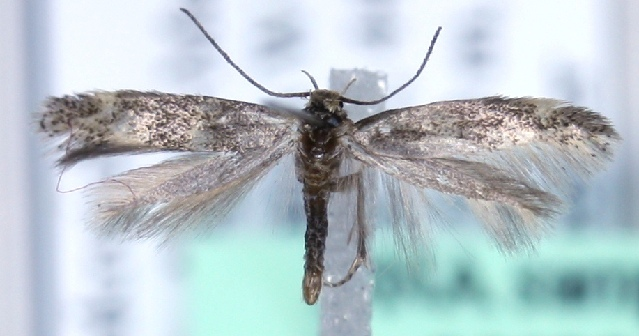

Scientific classification
- Domain: Eukaryota
- Kingdom: Animalia
- Phylum: Arthropoda
- Class: Insecta
- Order: Lepidoptera
- Family: Elachistidae
- Genus: Elachista
- Species: E. albicapilla

Binomial name
- Elachista albicapilla Höfner, 1918

= Elachista albicapilla =

Species of moth

Elachista albicapilla is a moth of the family Elachistidae. It is found in Italy and Austria.
