= American Beetles =

Book on beetles in North America

American Beetles is a comprehensive description of the beetles of North America north of the tropical area of Mexico. It was started by Ross H. Arnett, Jr. as an update of his classic The Beetles of the United States; along with Michael C. Thomas, he enlisted more than 60 specialists to write treatments of each family. The work outlived Arnett, and was published by CRC Press in 2001 (vol. 1) and 2002 (vol. 2).

This is a highly technical book, with extensive references to the literature. The introduction includes a section on beetle anatomy that introduces all the technical terms used later. The bulk of the content consists of treatments of the 130-odd families known to occur in North America (a couple dozen are not known from North America, and are not described); the descriptive material applies worldwide, and there are brief notes about non-North American family members.

A family treatment consists of a morphological description, including the larvae if known, habits and habitats, status of the classification, a key to the Nearctic genera (and sometimes species, if the family is small), and short treatments of the subtaxa. Every family gets at least one drawing of a member, and larger families may include dozens of drawings illustrating particular characters important for classification. Note that the classification that appears in Volume 1, pp. 10–13, is superseded by a number of changes that appeared in Volume 2 (the relegation of the families Monommatidae, Colydiidae, and Bruchidae to subfamily status, and the revised spelling of Ripiphoridae), and these changes have been incorporated into the List of subgroups of the order Coleoptera.

A handful of color photographs are included in a center section.

- Volume 1: Archostemata, Myxophaga, Adephaga, Polyphaga: Staphyliniformia ISBN 0-8493-1925-0
- Volume 2: Polyphaga ISBN 0-8493-0954-9
