= Gabriel Höfner =

Austrian entomologist

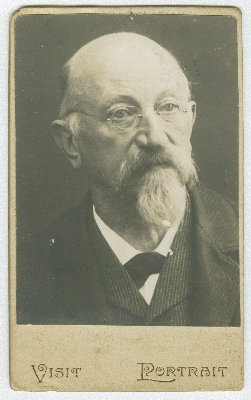
Gabriel Hofner

Gabriel Höfner ( 16 May 1842, Türnitz, Niederösterreich- 4 March 1921, Wolfsberg, Carinthia) was an Austrian entomologist, musician and composer.

== Entomology ==
Gabriel Höfner specialised in Lepidoptera, most notably species from Carinthia, Lavanttal, Koralpe and the Saualpe. He described Micropterix aureoviridella (Höfner, 1898), Dichagyris nigrescens (Höfner, 1887), Montanima karavankensis (Höfner, 1888), Elachista albicapilla (Höfner, 1918) and Elachista argentifasciella (Höfner, 1898).

Höfner undertook studies on Erebia and Psychidae, among others in over 40 publications (1876–1900) on Lepidoptera. He was past master of the Lepidoptera of Carinthia recording over 1,600 species.

=== Publications ===
- Die Schmetterlinge des Lavantthales und der beiden Alpen „Kor- und Saualpe“ (Papilio – Eupithecia). Jahrb. d. naturh. Landesmuseums von Kärnten, Heft XII, 1876, p. 1.
- Die Schmetterlinge des Lavantthales etc. (Mikrolepidopteren und Nachtrag zur Makrolepidopterenfauna) ibidem Heft XIII, 1878, p. 113. (Neubeschreibung von Erebia arete ab. albofasciata.)
- Die Schmetterlinge des Lavantthales (I.Nachtrag.) ibidem Heft XIV, 1880, p. 259.
- Die Schmetterlinge des Lavantthales (II. Nachtrag.) ibidem Heft XV, 1882, p. 193.
- Beobachtungen über Vorkommen und Lebensweise verschiedener besonders Gebirge und Alpen bewohnender Schmetterlingsarten. Wiener entomol. Zeitung, II. Jahrgang, 1883, p. 189, 221, 245, 277.
- Die Schmetterlinge des Lavantthales (III. Nachtrag.) Jahrbuch etc., Heft XVI, 1884, p. 162.
- Die Schmetterlinge des Lavantthales (IV. Nachtrag.) Jahrbuch etc., Heft XVII, 1885, p. 217.
- Die Schmetterlinge des Lavantthales (V. Nachtrag.) Jahrbuch etc., Heft XVIII, 1886.
- Berichtigungen und Ergänzungen zum Lepidopterenkatalog von Dr. Staudinger und Dr. Wocke. Societ. entom. I. Jhrg., 1886. p. 41, 50–51, 59–60, 69, 75–76, 82–83, 93, 106, 114, 131–132, 169–170; II. Jhrg., 1887, p. 12–13, 20–21, 44, 51–52, 65, 75–76, 91–92, 101, 106.
- Drei neubenannte Schmetterlingsabänderungen. Soc. entom., II. Jahrgang, 1887, p. 121. (Erebia eriphyle ab. impunctata, Epineuronia cespitis ab. ferruginea, Agrotis forcipula-v. nigrèscens.)
- Beitrag zur Naturgeschichte von Gnophos ambiguata Dup. Soc. entom. II. Jahrgang, 1887, p. 131–132.
- Eigentümlichkeiten des Falters und Beschreibung der jungen Raupe von Erebia arete F. Soc. entom. III. Jahrgang, 1888, p. 10–11.
- Die Schmetterlinge des Lavantthales (VI. Nachtrag.) Jahrbuch etc., Heft XIX (Jahrgang XXXVI), 1888, p. 113.
- Die Schmetterlinge des Lavantthales (VII. Nachtrag.) Jahrbuch etc., Heft XX (Jahrgang XXXVII), 1889, p. 156.
- Die Schmetterlinge des Lavantthales (V1II. Nachtrag.) Jahrbuch etc., Heft XXI (Jahrgang XXXVIII), 1890, p. 269. (Neubeschrieben: Cabera exanthcmqta ab. bistrigata, Incurvaria trimaculella ab. quadrimaculella.)
- Die Schmetterlinge des Lavantthales (IX. Nachtrag.) Jahrbuch etc., Heft XXIII (Jhrg. XLI und XL11), 1895, p. 68.
- Beitrag zur Schmetterlingsfauna der Petzen. Jahrbuch etc., Heft XXIII, 1895, p. 74.
- Hiptelia lorezi Stgr. und die Artverschiedenheit von Cidaria soldarid Turati und candidata S. V. Soc. entom. IX. Jhrg., 1895, p. 177.
- Die Schmetterlinge des Lavantthales (X. Nachtrag.) Jahrbuch etc., Heft XXIV (Jahrgang XLIII und XLIV), 1897, p. t65. [Neubeschrieben: Abraxas marginata ab. mediofasrciata (p. 168) und Syrichthus serratulae ab. tarasoides (p. 166)].
- I. Nachtrag zur Schmetterlingsfauna der Petzen. Jahrb. etc., Heft XXIV, 1897, p. 171. [Neubeschrieben: Mamestra chrysozona var. turbida (p. 174)].
- Drei neue Schmetterlingsarten. Soc. entom. XIII. Jahrgang, 1899, Nr. 9 p. 65–66, Nr. 10 p. 73–74. (Rebelia karawankensis, Elachista argentifasciella, Micropteryx aureoviridelta.)
- Die Schmetterlinge des Lavantthales (XI. Nachtrag.) Jahrbuch etc., Heft XXVI Jahrgang XLVII, 1900, p. 247.
- Die Schmetterlinge des Lavantthales (XU. Nachtrag.) Carinthia, Mitteil. des naturhistor. Landesmus, für Kärnten, 93. Jahrgang, 1903, p. 177.
- Die Schmetterlinge Kärntens. Jahrbuch des naturh. Landesmuseums von Kärnten, Jahrgang XLVIII, 1905, p. 179–416.
- Die Schmetterlinge Kärntens (II. Teil) ibidem, Jahrgang XLIX, 1909, p. 1–120.
- I. Nachtrag zur Schmetterlingsfauna Kärntens. Carinthia, II. Jahrgang 101,. 1911, Nr. 1 und 2, p. 18–46.
- U. Nachtrag zur Schmetterlingsfauna Kärntens (von 1910 an). Carinthia, II. Jahrgang 105, 1915.
