= Journey to the Ants =

Book by Bert Hölldobler and Edward O. Wilson

Journey to the Ants: A Story of Scientific Exploration
- Cover of the first edition
- Authors: Bert Hölldobler; E. O. Wilson
- Language: English
- Subject: Ants
- Publisher: Harvard University Press
- Publication date: 1994
- Publication place: United States
- Media type: Print (Hardcover)
- Pages: 228
- ISBN: 0-674-48525-4

Journey to the Ants: A Story of Scientific Exploration is a 1994 book by the evolutionary biologist Bert Hölldobler and the biologist Edward O. Wilson. The book was written as a popularized account for the layman of the science earlier presented in their book The Ants (1990), which won the Pulitzer Prize for General Nonfiction in 1991.

== Editions ==
- Paperback, on The Belknap Press of Harvard University Press: ISBN 0-674-48526-2
