= Bert Hölldobler =

German biologist (born 1936)

Bert Hölldobler BVO
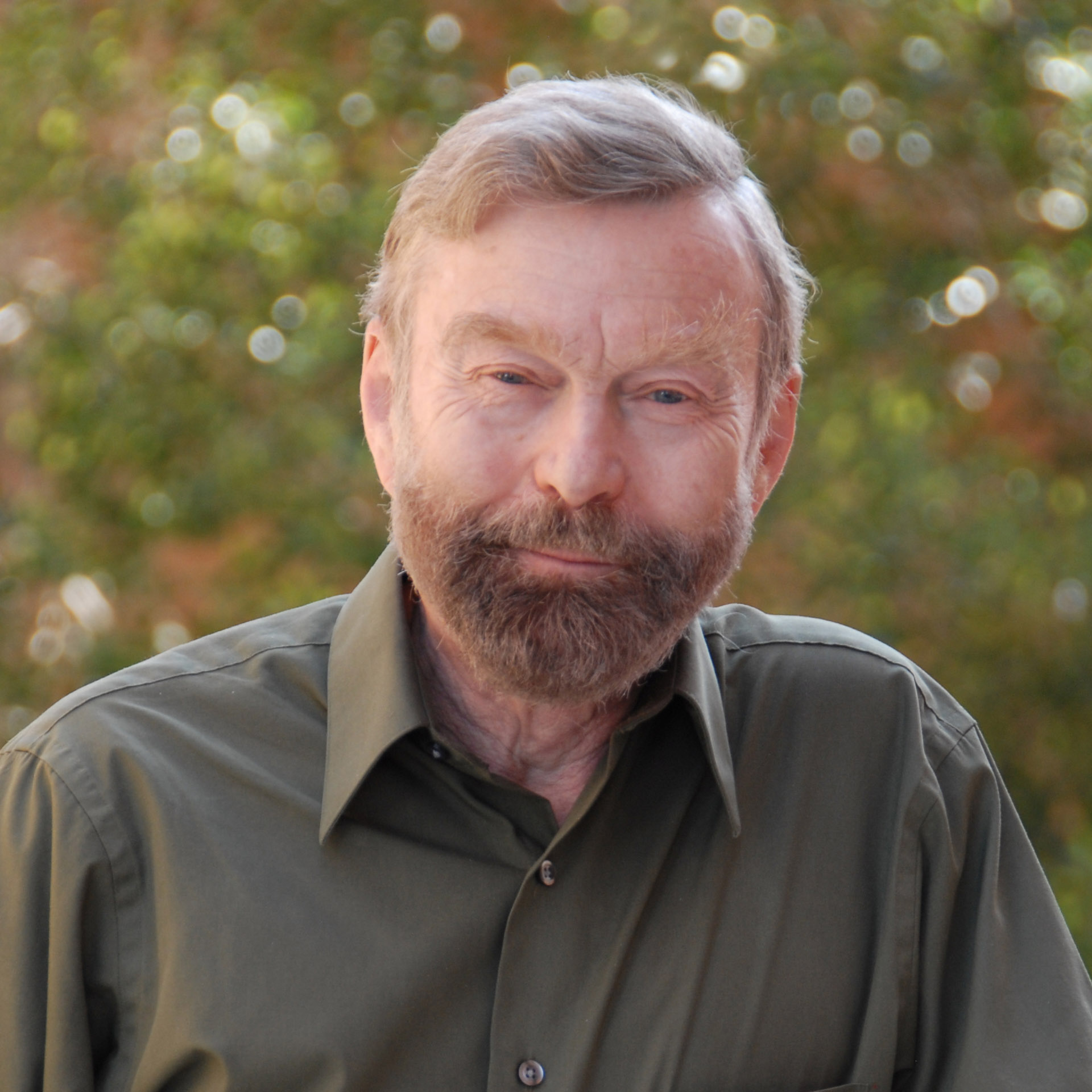
- Hölldobler in 2010
- Born: Berthold Karl Hölldobler; 25 June 1936 (age 90); Andechs, Bavaria, Germany
- Education: University of Würzburg (PhD)
- Known for: The Ants (1990)
- Awards: Guggenheim Fellowship (1980); Leibniz Prize (1990); Pulitzer Prize (1991); Order of Merit of the Federal Republic of Germany (2000); Lichtenberg Medal (2010)
- Scientific career
- Fields: Zoology; Sociobiology
- Workplaces: University of Frankfurt; Harvard University; University of Würzburg; Cornell University; Arizona State University

Berthold Karl Hölldobler BVO (born 25 June 1936) is a German zoologist, sociobiologist and evolutionary biologist who studies evolution and social organization in ants. He is the author of several books, including The Ants, for which he and his co-author, E. O. Wilson, received the Pulitzer Prize for non-fiction writing in 1991.

== Biography ==
Hölldobler was born June 25, 1936, in Erling-Andechs, Bavaria, Germany; he was the son of Karl and Maria Hölldobler. He studied biology and chemistry at the University of Würzburg. His doctoral thesis was on the social behavior of the male carpenter ant and their role in the organization of carpenter ant societies. He was named professor of zoology at the University of Frankfurt in 1971. From 1973 to 1990, he was professor of biology and the Alexander Agassiz Professor of Zoology at Harvard University in Cambridge, Massachusetts. In 1989, he returned to Germany to accept the chair of behavioral physiology and sociobiology at the Theodor-Boveri-Institute of the University of Würzburg. From 2002 to 2008 Hölldobler was an Andrew D. White Professor at Large at Cornell University in Ithaca, New York. Since his retirement in 2004 Hölldobler has worked as a research professor in the School of Life Sciences at Arizona State University in Tempe, Arizona. There he is one of the founders of the Social Insect Research Group (SIRG) and the Center for Social Dynamics and Complexity.

== Research fields and publications ==
Hölldobler is one of the world's leading experts in myrmecology. His experimental and theoretical contributions cover sociobiology, behavioral ecology, and chemical ecology. His primary study subjects are social insects and in particular ants. His work has provided valuable insights into mating strategies, regulation of reproduction, the evolution of social parasitism, chemical communications, and the concept of "superorganisms". Publications on these topics include:

- 1965. with U. Maschwitz, Der Hochzeitsschwarm der Rossameise Camponotus herculeanus L. (Hym. Formicidae). Z. Vergl. Physiol. 50:551-568
- 1971. Sex pheromone in the ant Xenomyrmex floridanus J. Insect. Physiol. 17:1497-1499
- 1973. with M. Wüst Ein Sexualpheromon bei der Pharaoameise Monomorium pharaonis (L.) Z. Tierpsychol. 32:1-9
- 1974. Home range orientation and territoriality in harvesting ants Proc. Natl. Acad. Sci. USA, 71:3274-3277
- 1976. Recruitment behavior, home range orientation and territoriality in harvester ants, Pogonomyrmex Behav. Ecol. Sociobiol. 1:3-44
- 1978. with H. Engel, Tergal and sternal glands in ants Psyche 85:285-330
- 1980. with C. Lumsden, Territorial Strategies in Ants Science 210:732-739
- 1982. with H. Engel, R.W. Taylor, A New Sternal Gland in Ants and its Function in Chemical Communication Naturwissenschaften 69:90
- 1983. with E.O. Wilson, Queen Control in Colonies of Weaver Ants (Hymenoptera: Formicidae) Ann. of the Ent. Soc. of America 76:235-238
- 1984. with N.F. Carlin, Nestmate and Kin Recognition in Interspecific Mixed Colonies of Ants Science 222:1027-1029
- 1987. with N.F. Carlin, Anonymity and specificity in the chemical communication signals of social insects J. Comp. Physiol. A 161:567-581
- 1992. with K. Sommer, Coexistence and dominance among queens and mated workers in the ant Pachycondyla tridentata Naturwissenschaften 19:470-472
- 1998. with M. Obermayer, G.D. Alpert, Chemical trail communication in the amblyoponine species Mystrium rogeri Forel (Hymenoptera, Formicidae, Ponerinae) Chemoecology, 8:119-123
- 1999 with K. Tsuji, K. Egashira, Regulation of worker reproduction by direct physical contact in the ant Diacamma sp. from Japan Animal Behaviour 58:337-343
- 2003. with J. Gadau, C.P. Strehl, J. Oettler, Determinants of intracolonial relatedness in Pogonomyrmex rugosus (Hymenoptera; Formicidae) – mating frequency and brood raids, Molecular Ecology 12: 1931-1938
- 1999. with J. Liebig, C. Peeters, Worker policing limits the number of reproductives in a ponerine ant Proc. R. Soc. Lond. B 266:1865-1870

== Awards ==
- John Simon Guggenheim Fellowship (1980)
- Gottfried Wilhelm Leibniz Prize of the Deutschen Forschungsgemeinschaft (1990)
- Pulitzer Prize (1991) for The Ants together with Edward O. Wilson
- U.S. Senior Scientist Prize of the Alexander von Humboldt Foundation
- Werner Heisenberg-Medal of the Alexander von Humboldt Foundation
- Körberpreis for the European Science (1996)
- Karl Ritter von Frisch Medal and Science Prize of the German Zoological Society (1996)
- Benjamin Franklin-Wilhelm v. Humboldt Prize of the German-American Academic Council ( 1999)
- Honorary doctor Biology of the University of Konstanz (2000)
- Order of Merit First Class of the Federal Republic of Germany (2000)
- Bavarian Maximilian Order for Science and Art (2003)
- Alfried-Krupp-Wissenschaftspreis (2004)
- Treviranus-Medal of the Verband deutscher Biologen (vdbiol) (2006)
- Lichtenberg Medal (2010)
- Ernst-Jünger-Prize for Entomology Baden-Württemberg (2010)
- Cothenius Medal in Gold of the Deutschen Akademie der Naturforscher Leopoldina (2011)
- Exemplar Award by the American Animal Behavior Society (2013)
- Fabricius medal (2019) (German entomological society)

== Academic associations ==
- Fellow of the American Animal Behavior Society (1992)
- Bayerischen Akademie der Wissenschaften (1986 korrespondierend, 1995 ordentlich)
- American Academy of Arts and Sciences
- Deutsche Nationale Akademie der Wissenschaften Leopoldina (1975)
- Fellow of the American Association for the Advancement of Science (1979)
- Academia Europaea (1994)
- Berlin-Brandenburgische Akademie der Wissenschaften (1995)
- National Academy of Sciences (United States) (1998)
- American Philosophical Society (1997)
- Fellow of the Entomological Society of America (2019)

== Documentary films ==
In addition to his published scientific papers and books, Hölldobler's work was the subject of the documentary film Ants - Nature's Secret Power the winner of the 2005 Jackson Hole Wildlife Film Festivals Special Jury Prize.

- Ants don't fight wars for war's sake on YouTube
- Ants fight to survive on YouTube
- The amazing world of ants on YouTube

== Books ==
- Bert Hölldobler, E.O. Wilson: The Ants, Harvard University Press, 1990, ISBN 0-674-04075-9
- Bert Hölldobler, E.O. Wilson: Journey to the Ants: A Story of Scientific Exploration, 1994, ISBN 0-674-48525-4
- Bert Hölldobler, E.O. Wilson: The Superorganism: The Beauty, Elegance, and Strangeness of Insect Societies, W.W. Norton, 2008. ISBN 978-0-393-06704-0
- Bert Hölldobler, E.O. Wilson: The Leafcutter Ants: Civilization by Instinct, W.W. Norton & Company, Inc., 2011, ISBN 978-0-393-33868-3
- Bert Hölldobler, Christina L. Kwapich: The Guests of Ants: How Myrmecophiles Interact with Their Hosts, Belknap Press of Harvard University Press, 2022, ISBN 978-0-674-26551-6
