= Stephen Taber III =

American apiologist

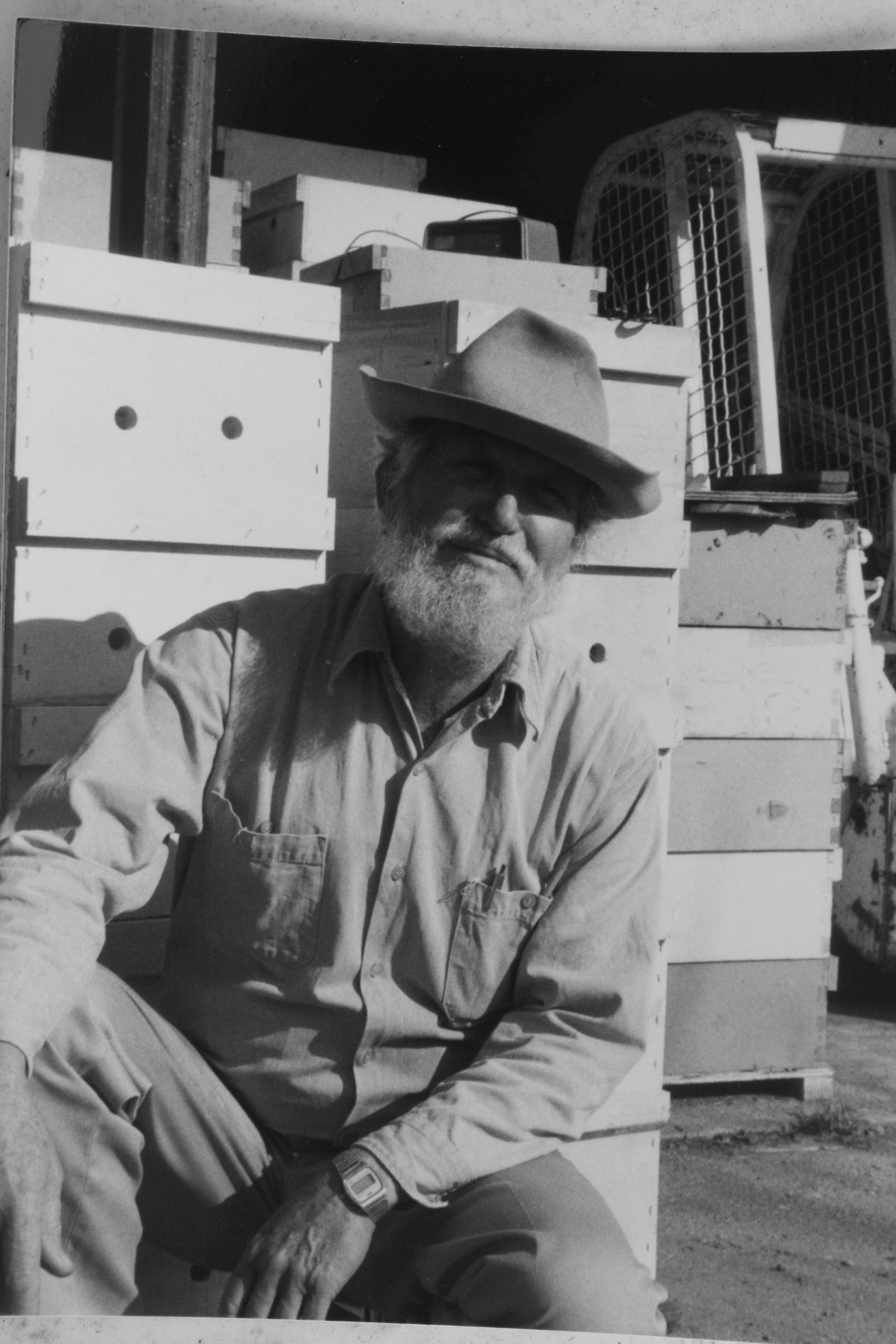
- Born: 17 April 1924; Columbia, South Carolina, U.S.
- Died: 22 May 2008 (aged 84); Elgin, South Carolina, U.S.
- Occupations: Apiculturist, United States Department of Agriculture;

Stephen Taber III. (17 April 1924 – 22 May 2008) was an American apiologist, noted authority and author in the field of artificial insemination of queen bees for the purpose of developing disease resistant and gentle bee colonies.

== Biography ==
Mr. Stephen Taber III, was a world-recognized honey bee researcher. He was born on April 17, 1924, to Dr. Stephen Taber II and Bessie Ray Taber of Columbia, S.C. His father was the South Carolina State Geologist from 1912 to 1947 and the head of the Department of Geology at the University of South Carolina, where he was involved in the engineering of the Santee Cooper Dam among many other projects.

=== Early years ===
Steve became interested in bees at an early age, using the banks of the Broad River in Columbia as his research yard. Steve's first commercial beekeeping experience was in 1941 in upstate New York where he worked one summer making $30 a month. He continued working in NY and later Wisconsin where he claimed to have learned much of the basics of beekeeping.

=== Navy / WWII years ===
He graduated from University High School in Columbia, SC in 1942 and enlisted in the U.S. Navy as an Aviation Cadet in October that same year. While serving in the Navy, he taught beekeeping as a sideline job at several local universities. Steve was later honorably discharged from the Navy in September 1945 after the end of World War II. After the Navy, Steve attended the University of Wisconsin. In 1950, he graduated from the University of WI in Madison, with a Bachelor of Science, specializing in Bee Research under the tutelage of Professor C.L. Farrar.

=== USDA years ===
His first position was with the Entomology Research Division of USDA as an assistant to Dr. O. Mackenson in Baton Rouge, La. This is where he met his longtime friend Murray S. Blum. It was during this time that Steve pioneered the use of instrumental (artificial) insemination, undertaking some of the first seminal and biochemical investigations carried out with invertebrate spermatozoa.

After 15 years in Baton Rouge, he was transferred to the USDA Bee Research Center in Tucson, Arizona, where, in his words, "I was my own instructor." Steve traveled extensively teaching, lecturing, and researching.

Steve retired from the USDA and moved to Vacaville, CA where in cooperation with Tom Parisian, he founded the company known as "Taber's Honey Bee Genetics" in 1978. Steve later moved to southern France before returning in recent years to Elgin in his home state of South Carolina. He enjoyed international prestige as a bee researcher and queen breeder and spoke at beekeepers' conventions across Europe. Steve continued his queen rearing and research work on a limited basis, although he continued to be a prolific writer until shortly before his death in 2008.

=== Legacy ===
Some of his students are leaders in the world of beekeeping research today. His book, "Breeding Super Bees," will attest to some of his research and his studies around the world. His articles and research publications are still being referenced by honey bee researchers worldwide. Articles written by Steve, and his collaborative efforts with others, appeared in numerous publications for more than 50 years. They include American Bee Journal, Gleanings in Bee Culture, Journal of Economic Entomology, Journal of Apicultural Research and Beekeepers Quarterly.

== Additional publications and research ==
- Taber III, Stephen (1955). "Evidence Of Binucleate Eggs In The Honey Bee". Journal of Heredity. 46, 4.
- Taber III, Stephen; Murray S. Blum (1960). "Preservation of Honey Bee Semen". Science. 131 (3415): 1734–1735. Bibcode:1960Sci...131.1734T. doi:10.1126/science.131.3415.1734. PMID 13836523. S2CID 42289021.
- Taber III, Stephen; Alexej B. Bořkovec (1969). "Chemical Sterilization of Honey Bee Spermatozoa in vitro". Nature. 224 (5225): 1217–1218. Bibcode:1969Natur.224.1217T. doi:10.1038/2241217a0. PMID 5358349. S2CID 1317148.
