= The Ants =

1990 book by Bert Hölldobler and E. O. Wilson

- Authors: Bert Hölldobler; E.O. Wilson
- Language: English
- Subject: Zoology
- Published: March 28, 1990 (Belknap Press)
- Publication place: United States
- Media type: Print (Hardcover)
- Pages: 746
- ISBN: 0-674-04075-9
- OCLC: 19325464
- Dewey Decimal: 595.79/6 19
- LC Class: QL568.F7 H57 1990
- Followed by: Journey to the Ants

The Ants is a zoology textbook by the German entomologist Bert Hölldobler and the American entomologist E. O. Wilson, first published in 1990. It won the Pulitzer Prize for General Nonfiction in 1991.

== Contents ==
This book is primarily aimed at academics as a reference work, detailing the ants' anatomy, physiology, social organization including their caste system, altruistic behaviour, and chemical communication with pheromones, their ecology (vital for turning the soil and controlling insect pests), and natural history.

An account of some of Hölldobler and Wilson's most interesting findings, popularized for the layman, can be found in their 1994 book Journey to the Ants.

== Reception ==
The Science magazine reviewer described the book as a "mighty tome" and commented that it would "surely take its place among the greatest of all entomology books", as it was "a wonderful exploration of almost every ramification of evolutionary biology, from developmental biology to the structure of ecological communities". The illustrations are praised as lavish and extremely detailed, with monochrome drawings and 24 colour plates. All the 297 extant genera are illustrated and identifiable with the supplied keys. But "The Ants, like every great book and every ant colony, is much more than the sum of its parts."

Diana Wheeler, reviewing the book in The Quarterly Review of Biology, comments that William Morton Wheeler thought his book not practical to revise as it would require too much work and would make the book too expensive, and that it was fortunate that the authors "did not flinch" at the challenge. They had produced a massive but affordable volume, and it was accessible to the public as well as to entomologists.

== See also ==
- Ants: Their Structure, Development and Behavior
