= Murray S. Blum =

American entomologist (1929 - 2015)

Murray Sheldon Blum (19 July 1929 - 22 March 2015) was an American entomologist and a researcher in the field of chemical ecology.

Born in 1929 to a Jewish family in Philadelphia, Pennsylvania, Blum grew up in that city and in Chicago. He earned a BSc in Biology and his Ph.D. in entomology from the University of Illinois in 1955. After serving in the U.S. Army during the Korean War, he joined the faculty of Louisiana State University in 1957. In the 1960s he moved to the University of Georgia, where he spent three decades as a research professor before his retirement. The Entomological Society of America named him as outstanding scientist of the year in 1978, and in 1989 he received the International Society of Chemical Ecology Medal for outstanding scientific contributions.

Blum concentrated much of his research in the area of chemical ecology, and is well-recognized as an expert on pheromones. His subjects of interest also included the eastern lubber grasshopper (Romalea microptera) and imported fire ants as the latter species (Solenopsis invicta) spread through the southern United States. Blum's entomology associates and close friends include noted apiologist Stephen Taber III.

Blum died in 2015 at the age of 85. His daughter Deborah Blum is a Pulitzer Prize-winning journalist and author.

== Publications ==
A past winner of the Lamar Dodd Award for excellence in research, he was the author of many scholarly publications, including the book Chemical Defenses of Arthropods.

- Blum, Murray S. Chemical Defenses of Arthropods. New York: Academic Press, 1981.
- Blum, Murray S, ed. Chemistry and Toxicology of Diverse Classes of Alkaloids. Fort Collins, CO: Alaken, 1996.
- Blum, Murray S., ed. Fundamentals of Insect Physiology. New York: Wiley, 1985.
- Blum, Murray S. and Nancy Ann Blum, eds. Sexual Selection and Reproductive Competition in Insects. New York: Academic Press, 1979.
- Blum, Murray S., ed. Toxic Action of Marine and Terrestrial Alkaloids.Ft.Collins, CO: Alaken, 1995.
