= Murinus Cornelius Piepers =

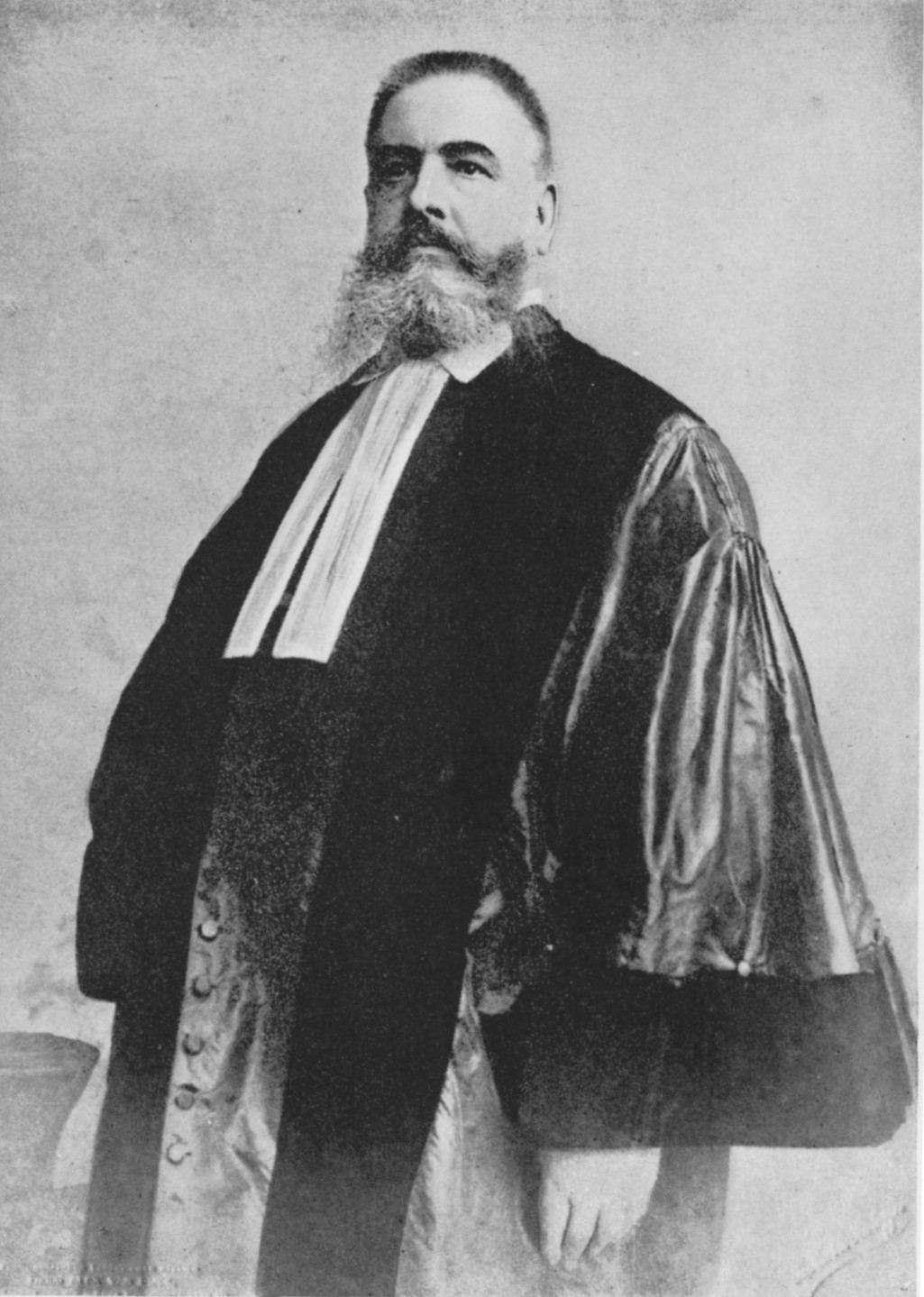
M.C. Piepers

Marinus Cornelius Piepers (1836 – 1919 in The Hague) was a Dutch entomologist and lawyer.

Piepers studied law in Leiden and obtained his doctorate in 1859. He worked for the administration of justice until 1894. In 1879, he was appointed Advocate General at the Supreme Court of the Dutch East Indies. In 1890 he became vice-president.

Piepers spent three decades from 1863 in the Dutch East Indies (now Indonesia) collecting and observing butterfly behaviour and other organisms. He recorded his data in two books Mimikry, Selektion und Darwinismus (1903) and Nocheinmal Mimicry, Selektion und Darwinism (1907). Piepers was an opponent of Darwinism and was influenced by the research of Theodor Eimer. He specialised in Lepidoptera and Coleoptera especially of the Dutch East Indies. His collection is conserved in Naturalis in Leiden. Piepers was a philosophical vitalist.

== Selected publications ==
- Mimikry, Selektion und Darwinismus (1903)
- The Rhopalocera of Java with Pieter Cornelius Tobias Snellen and Hans Fruhstorfer. The Hague, M. Nijhoff 1909-18. Four volumes.
