= Leopold Fulmek =

Austrian entomologist (1883–1969)

Leopold Fulmek (9 November 1883 in Kattau in Meiseldorf – 17 June 1969 in Vienna) was an Austrian entomologist who specialised in Hymenoptera especially species parasitizing crop pests and therefore useful in biological control

After passing his Matura in Vienna (1902), Fulmek studied Zoology and Botany at the University of Vienna, graduating in 1907. He was Direktor der BA f. Pflanzenschutz in Wien (Director of the Federal Institution for Plant Protection in Vienna) until 1945. After that he worked on the Hymenoptera collections at the Naturhistorisches Museum in Vienna.

== Publications ==
- 1968 Parasitinsekten der Insektengallen Europas. Breit. Ent., 18: 719-952.
