= Hopkins Notes and Records System =

U.S. entomological database

The concept of a system for filing and for the cross-referencing of specimen, collection, and identification information, was first advanced by A. D. Hopkins in 1894. The System was formally initiated by the U.S. Department of Agriculture in 1902 by Hopkins himself, who was subsequently named Chief of Forest Insect Investigations. It was still in use in 1987 by more than twenty Forest Service units of Forest Insect and Disease Research and Forest Pest Management, and by the Agricultural Research Service Systematic Entomology Laboratory (ARS-SEL). A salient feature or the System was the controlled assignment of “Hopkins numbers” to avoid redundancy within or between field units. These unique numbers allow for the keying of records, an essential pre-requisite for the creation of a proper relational database.

The paper records of the Hopkins Notes and Records System and the corresponding digital records in the Hopkins US System Index (HUSSI) are co-dependent repositories for data about specimens of forest insects and their damage. These specimens were curated by Government professionals beginning with Hopkins' work at the USDA. The more than 80 years of records with identification and collection information are from all geographic areas managed by the USDA Forest Service, as well as small subset of records from other countries.

== Genesis ==
A.D. Hopkins, commonly referred to as the father of forest entomology in the United States, formulated the record-keeping system that now bears his name. Hopkins brought his system to the federal government when he came to work for the Division of Entomology in the late 1890s, by which time he had already been using his record-keeping system at West Virginia University, Morgantown, WV, where he previously worked. Hopkins then brought the system to the USDA Division of Entomology in 1902. It was subsequently adopted by personnel of Forest Insect Investigations at field stations throughout the country. The System contains U.S. in its name to distinguish it from those earlier Hopkins records at West Virginia University. The Hopkins U.S. System became widely used by Forest Service Research, by other pest management units, and also by ARS-SEL. It was in continuous use until the mid-1980s.

=== The Hopkins Notebook Series ===
The biological data from the original Hopkins records were recorded on either 3"×5" forms, or on 3"×5" or 5"×8" cards (hereafter referred to simply as cards) that were filed in the Hopkins Notebook Series. These Notebooks are the original “database” from which the Hopkins U.S. System developed. The system, represented in these volumes, consists of notebook entries bearing “checklist numbers,” and a set of such file cards.

Cards are indexed to the descriptive narratives or notes that appear in the notebooks in numerical order by checklist number. Additional notes often provide extensive textual descriptions of the writer’s observations and many include detailed drawings as well. The table of contents for a given notebook was derived from the way in which those checklist numbers were assigned to individual collectors. Taken as a whole, the Notebook Series chronicles the work and travels of many of the pioneering figures of North American entomology, from the turn of the century to about 1920.

Beginning in 1899, number-series – usually in blocks of 100 to 200 – appear to have been assigned to entomologists as needed. There are also blocks of numbers that were evidently set aside to accommodate material that was sent to the staff entomologists for identification. Such blocks of numbers are designated “Office Notes.” Some blocks of numbers in the Office Notes series are from outside the contiguous United States. For example, specimens or collections from Central and South America, Mexico, Cuba, Puerto Rico, the Virgin Islands, and Africa appear there. The information shown in the Office Notes often include references to the original correspondence accompanying the specimens when they were submitted.

=== The Hopkins Record cards ===
The card observations consist of the collection and identification information associated, by number, with specific insect or damage specimens. The numbers also correspond to identical numbers originally attached to mounted insects in collections distributed across the country. They connect that field sample to the information about how, when, and by whom, the work was done. All of that information is detailed by the Hopkins Record cards. The cards are the only link that exists between the sample and its physical provenance. At some archive locations, the early records included the above-mentioned notebooks or ledgers containing more detailed information. The card files usually have three components: a numerical file, the basic file of cards in numerical order; the species file or insect species index; and host file or host index. The System has been applied differently at the various field locations; some units have only the numerical file.

== Organizational framework ==
Hopkins' organizing scheme was based on a series of duplicate paper records that contained collection and identification information about the specimens. Each record was given a unique sequential Hopkins U.S. Number. Specimens, each one bearing its own unique Hopkins US Number, and collection records were stored at Forest Service Research Stations and Laboratories, Regional Offices, and at the ARS-SEL in the U.S. National Museum / Smithsonian Institution.

The Hopkins US System contained about 163,000 paper records representing several hundred thousand identified specimens or series of specimens. These are either of insects or samples of insect-damage. Each record has information about taxon, insect and plant association, collection location, date, and collector at a minimum. In addition to the drawings and textual narratives, the record can also have measurements, notes on the research study or spray program, or rearing and other biological data provided by the original collector.

=== Specimen collection, preparation and record keeping ===
All the details of the overall process can be found in R.G. Mitchell's unpublished monograph. That work includes "the procedures one follows from the time insect materiel is collected until identifications are obtained". A numbered list of those procedures, taken from the monograph, is reproduced below, with a block diagram of the corresponding workflow shown on the right:

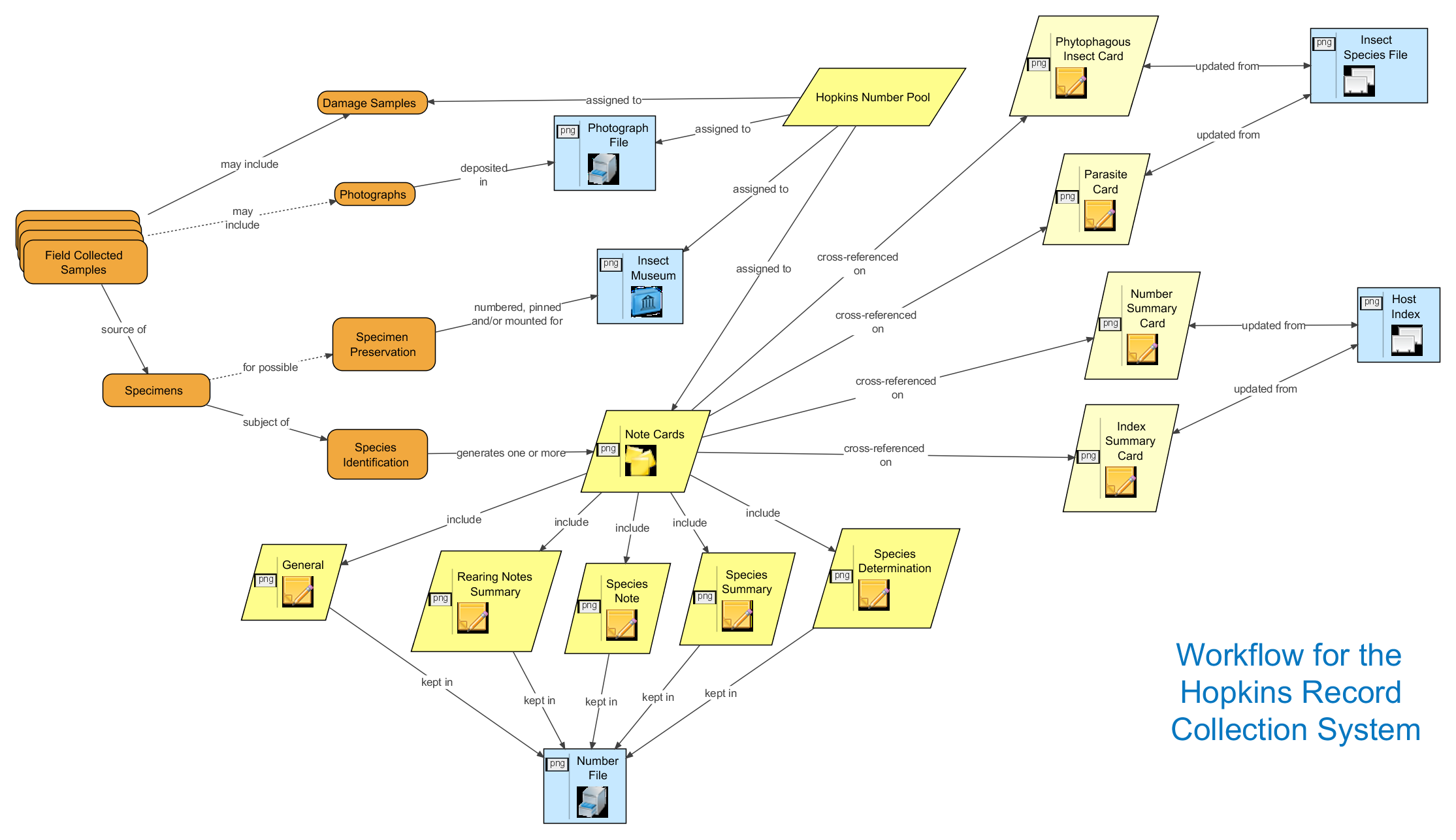
Workflow for the Hopkins records system

1. Collect insects or infested material, keeping insects separated by host.
2. Rear insects from infested host material or, in the case of defoliators, on fresh host material. When insects are collected as adults, rearing may not be necessary. (At times mating of insects and egg-laying may be desired to obtain needed biological information).
3. If the rearing or collecting results are of interest, assign a Hopkins number to the collection. (A single Hopkins number cannot be assigned to insects collected from more than one host species, or to insects of the same host species when the collections are separated appreciably by time, space, or host condition).
4. Fill out general note card (Figure 1) in the number file after preparing and editing a rough draft. The information should be typed on the card stamped with the Hopkins number.
5. If the insects were reared, fill out rearing notes summary card).
6. Fill out, if needed, species note card.
7. Separate insects by order and family. By microscopic examination decide how many species are represented.
8. Assign a "letter" suffix to the Hopkins number for each tentative identification and fill out species summary card.
9. Label insects (including a suffixed Hopkins number label) and place specimens in a Schmidt box in order of Hopkins number. Later, the insects to be identified will be removed and sent to a specialist. The duplicates retained at the Station are labeled with a blue tag to show that specimens have been sent away.
10. Make out three copies of the species determination card for each insect species being sent away for identification.
11. Write a covering memo for the insects to be shipped. One white copy is prepared for the Division Chief in Washington, D.C., in addition to the copy for the Station files.
12. Type six copies of the insect identification slip.
13. Attach two copies of each species determination card (step #9) and three copies of the insect identification slip (step #12) to the covering memo going to the specialist (usually through A.R.S. Division of Identification and Parasite Introduction). Mail memo.
14. Attach one insect identification slip (step #11) to the covering memo going to the W.O. This goes with other mail to the Chief, U.S.F.S.
15. Attach one insect identification slip (step #11) to the file copy of the covering memo and place in the pending file (U.S.F.S file code #4500-4).
16. Place one insect identification slip (step #11) in the shipping box and mail specimens to the specialist for identification.
17. Clip (use paper clip) all file copies of species determination cards together and place in pending section at the back of the number file. Place the other cards in the proper place in the number file.

== Current status ==
In 1986, concern for the safety and integrity of the Hopkins US System files prompted what was then the Forest Insect and Disease Research Staff (FIDR-WO) to take steps to preserve the information contained in the Hopkins US System. The intent was also to consolidate the information and make it more useful and accessible to the scientific community. About 153,000 Hopkins US System cards and nearly 10,000 notebook pages throughout the Forest Service and at ARS_SEL were microfilmed. Microfiche sets of the file cards were distributed to the office of FIDR-WO, Forest Service labs, Regional Offices, and field units nationwide, and to ARS-SEL.

To make the information in the Hopkins files more accessible, in 1987, FIDR began building the digital database that would become HUSSI. Approximately 61,000 ASCII records were initially created. Of these, about 37,000 records from Hopkins System files held by Forest Service units, mostly in the West, were developed into a relational database. The additional 20,000+ digitized ASCII records are from the Hopkins System paper records held by ARS-SEL at the U.S. National Museum. These have yet to be included in the database.

== Future of the digital records ==
The existing HUSSI database can be queried to produce plant-host and insect-host lists, historical records, and, for example, information on historic and recent geographic range of forest insects to indicate climate change. The unique Hopkins US Number allows users to obtain desired supplemental information on the physical location of curated specimens, and additional information on the original paper Hopkins record(s). Such information is available from Forest Service repositories, ARS-SEL at the U. S. National Museum / Smithsonian Institution, and from several universities where specimens, records, and/or microfiche now reside.

The goal is to make the records available over the Forest Service's internal network, and over the Internet as well. The Hopkins U.S. System has potential for use in forestry and forest entomology from a global perspective. The notes and records accumulated in the System constitute the foundational work for forest entomology in North America and elsewhere, and represent a set of historical field observations. The System was also a means of information sharing for the very earliest investigators during the pioneering phases of forest entomology in the United States.

At that time, little was known, not even the identities, of a large proportion of forest insects in this country. With files containing nearly 200,000 records, researchers had access to a basis for the study of most major forest insect pests. They continued until recent times to provide information for field manuals, host lists, and biological studies.

As forest conditions and forest management practices change, the roster of insects perceived to be pests changes. The Hopkins U.S. System files contain valuable biological information that can be used as a basis for dealing with insects reaching pest status. Because the files contain a vast amount of information on relationships between forest pests and their parasites, predators, and other associated insects, they have served as a source of information to evaluate the potential for biological control through introductions/redistributions of natural enemies or manipulation of habitats.
