= Pieter Cornelius Tobias Snellen =

Dutch entomologist (1832–1911)

Pieter Cornelius Tobias Snellen (30 August 1832 – 29 March 1911) was a Dutch entomologist.

Pieter Snellen was a merchant in Rotterdam. He is not to be confused with Samuel Constantinus Snellen van Vollenhoven, another entomologist from Rotterdam.

== Works ==
- Lepidoptera / door P.C.T. Snellen met eene inleidung door Joh. F. Snelleman. Leiden, Brill,1892 online at BHL
- The Rhopalocera of Java. with Murinus Cornelius Piepers and Hans Fruhstorfer. The Hague, M. Nijhoff 1909–18. online at Biodiversity Heritage Library Four volumes.
- Snellen, P.C.T. 1872 Bijdrage tot de Vlinder-Faune van Neder-Guinea, zuidwestelijk gedeelte van Afrika. Tidschrift voor Entomologie 15:1-112.
- Snellen, P.C.T. 1882 Aanteekeningen over Afrikaanische Lepidoptera. Tidschrift voor Entomologie 25:215-234.
