= Ross H. Arnett Jr. =

American entomologist

Ross Harold Arnett Jr. (April 13, 1919 – July 16, 1999) was an American entomologist noted for his studies of beetles, and as founder of The Coleopterists Bulletin.

Born in Medina, New York, he was a star student at Cornell University, where he became interested in beetles and started on a revision of the Nearctic Silphidae. He graduated in 1942, the same year that he married his high school sweetheart Mary Ennis.

His first job was at the New York State Conservation Department, studying the stomach contents of game birds, but in July 1942 he joined the US Army (as a private) and was sent to Lowry Air Force Base to study the Sperry bombsight. After this diversion into non-insect work, he went to Avon Park Air Force Range in Florida to survey the mosquito population and control it, and from there to the Army School of Malariology in Panama to teach mosquito taxonomy.

In October 1945 he was discharged and returned to Cornell for graduate study, where he studied under Robert Matheson and Walter Muenscher, receiving a master's degree in 1946 and the doctorate in 1948, where he returned to beetle work, revising the Oedemeridae. He started The Coleopterists Bulletin in 1947, while still a grad student.

In July 1948, the newly minted Dr. Arnett moved to Arlington, Virginia and went to work for the USDA as a beetle taxonomist. He returned to academia in 1954 however, as head of the biology department of Saint John Fisher College in Rochester, New York, then to The Catholic University of America in 1958, where he published his best-known work Beetles of the United States (1963). In 1966 Arnett moved to Purdue University, later spending three years as Henry L. Beadel Fellow at the Tall Timbers Research Station near Tallahassee, Florida, and then in 1973 moving to Siena College in Loudonville, New York.

In 1979 he resigned his position to write full-time, publishing several books, then in 1982 founding Flora and Fauna Publications in Gainesville, Florida. The company was bought by E.J. Brill Publishers, but in 1989 they stopped doing biology, and he formed Sandhill Crane Press to continue with his work. He also founded the Center for Systematic Entomology during this time.

He died at his home in Gainesville, while working on a new handbook American Beetles, which was published posthumously.

== Books ==
- Beetles of the United States (1963)
- An Introduction to Plant Biology (1970)
- Plant Biology: A Concise Introduction (1977)
- The Naturalists' Directory and Almanac (1979)
- How to Know the Beetles (1980)
- (with Richard L. Jacques, Jr.) Simon & Schuster's Guide to Insects (1981)
- Insect Life: A Field Entomology Manual for the Amateur Naturalist (1985)
- American Insects: Handbook of the Insects of America North of Mexico (1985, 2nd ed. 2000)
- (with Eugene Gerberg) Florida Butterflies (1989)
- The Insect & Spider Collections of the World (1993)
- (with N. M. Downie) The Beetles of Northeastern North America (1997)
- (with Michael C. Thomas) American Beetles (CRC Press, 2001)
