= Michael C. Thomas =

American entomologist (1948–2019)

- Born: May 5, 1948; Miami, Florida, U.S.
- Died: October 4, 2019 (aged 71); Gainesville, Florida, U.S.
- Education: University of Florida
- Known for: American Beetles
- Scientific career
- Fields: Entomology
- Workplaces: Florida Department of Agriculture

Michael Charles Thomas (May 5, 1948 – October 14, 2019) was an American entomologist who co-authored the book series American Beetles.

Born in Miami, Florida, Thomas graduated from the University of South Florida in 1970 with a Bachelor of Arts degree in fine arts, followed by a Master of Science degree in entomology from the University of Florida in 1981. Thomas also received his Ph.D. from the University of Florida.

From 1986 to 1988, Thomas worked as a Taxonomic Entomologist for the West Virginia Department of Agriculture.

Beginning in 1988, Thomas worked for the Florida Department of Agriculture in Gainesville as a Taxonomic Entomologist, an Entomology Section Administrator, and a Curator of Coleoptera and Orthoptera. His research interests included the biology and systematics of Cucujidae, and the zoogeography of the beetles of Florida. He retired in 2013.
