= List of Oedemeridae genera =

This is a list of 55 genera in the family Oedemeridae, false blister beetles.

== Oedemeridae genera ==
- Alloxantha Seidlitz, 1899^{g}
- Ananca Fairmaire and Germain, 1863^{i c g}
- Anisochroa Semenov, 1900^{g}
- Anisochrodes Svihla, 1983^{g}
- Anogcodes Dejean, 1834^{g}
- Asclera Stephens, 1839^{i c g b}
- Ascleranoncodes Pic, 1915^{g}
- Baculipalpus Broun, 1880^{g}
- Calopus Fabricius, 1775^{i c g b}
- Chitona W.Schmidt, 1844^{g}
- Chitonoidea Svihla, 1983^{g}
- Chrysanthia Schmidt, 1846^{g}
- Colobostomoides Svihla, 1983^{g}
- Colobostomus Fairmaire, 1886^{g}
- Copidita LeConte, 1866^{i c g b}
- Dityloidea Fairmaire & Germain, 1863^{g}
- Ditylus Fischer, 1817^{i c g b}
- Dryopomera Fairmaire, 1897^{g}
- Eobia Semenov, 1894^{g}
- Eumecoleus Haupt, 1950^{g}
- Eumecomera Arnett, 1951^{i c g b}
- Ganglbaueria Semenov, 1891^{g}
- Heliocis Arnett, 1951^{i c g b}
- Hypasclera Kirsch, 1866^{i c g b}
- Hyperopselaphus Mizota, 1999^{g}
- Indasclera Svihla, 1980^{g}
- Ischnomera Stephens, 1832^{g}
- Matusinhosa Pic, 1923^{g}
- Micronacerdes Pic, 1923^{g}
- Nacerdes Dejean, 1834^{i c g b}
- Nacerdochroa Reitter, 1893^{g}
- Nacerdochroides Svihla, 1986^{g}
- Necromera Martynov, 1926^{g}
- Nerdanus Fairmaire, 1897^{g}
- Oedemera Olivier, 1789^{g}
- Opsimea Miller, 1880^{g}
- Oxacis LeConte, 1866^{i c g b}
- Oxycopis Arnett, 1951^{i c g b}
- Paloedemera Wickham, 1914^{g}
- Parisopalpus Hudson, 1975^{g}
- Paroxacis Arnett, 1951^{i c g b}
- Polacus ^{g}
- Polypria ^{b}
- Probosca W.Schmidt, 1846^{g}
- Pselaphanca ^{g}
- Rhinoplatia Horn, 1868^{i c g b}
- Schistopselaphus Fairmaire, 1896^{g}
- Sessinia Pascoe, 1863^{i c g}
- Sisenes Champion, 1889^{i c g b}
- Sparedrus Dejean, 1821^{i c g b}
- Stenostoma Latreille, 1810^{g}
- Thelyphassa Pascoe, 1876^{i c g}
- Vasaces Champion, 1889^{i c g b}
- Xanthochroa Schmidt, 1846^{i c g b}
- Xanthochroina Ganglbauer, 1881^{i c g b}

Data sources: i = ITIS, c = Catalogue of Life, g = GBIF, b = Bugguide.net
