= Oxycopis howdeni =

Scientific classification
- Kingdom: Animalia
- Phylum: Arthropoda
- Class: Insecta
- Order: Coleoptera
- Suborder: Polyphaga
- Infraorder: Cucujiformia
- Family: Oedemeridae
- Tribe: Asclerini
- Genus: Oxycopis
- Species: O. howdeni

Binomial name
- Oxycopis howdeni Arnett, 1965

Species of beetle

Oxycopis howdeni is a species of false blister beetle in the family Oedemeridae. It is found in Central America and North America.
