= Oxycopis floridana =

Scientific classification
- Domain: Eukaryota
- Kingdom: Animalia
- Phylum: Arthropoda
- Class: Insecta
- Order: Coleoptera
- Suborder: Polyphaga
- Infraorder: Cucujiformia
- Family: Oedemeridae
- Tribe: Asclerini
- Genus: Oxycopis
- Species: O. floridana

Binomial name
- Oxycopis floridana (Horn, 1896)

Species of beetle

Oxycopis floridana is a species of false blister beetle in the family Oedemeridae. It is known from Florida and the Bahamas.
