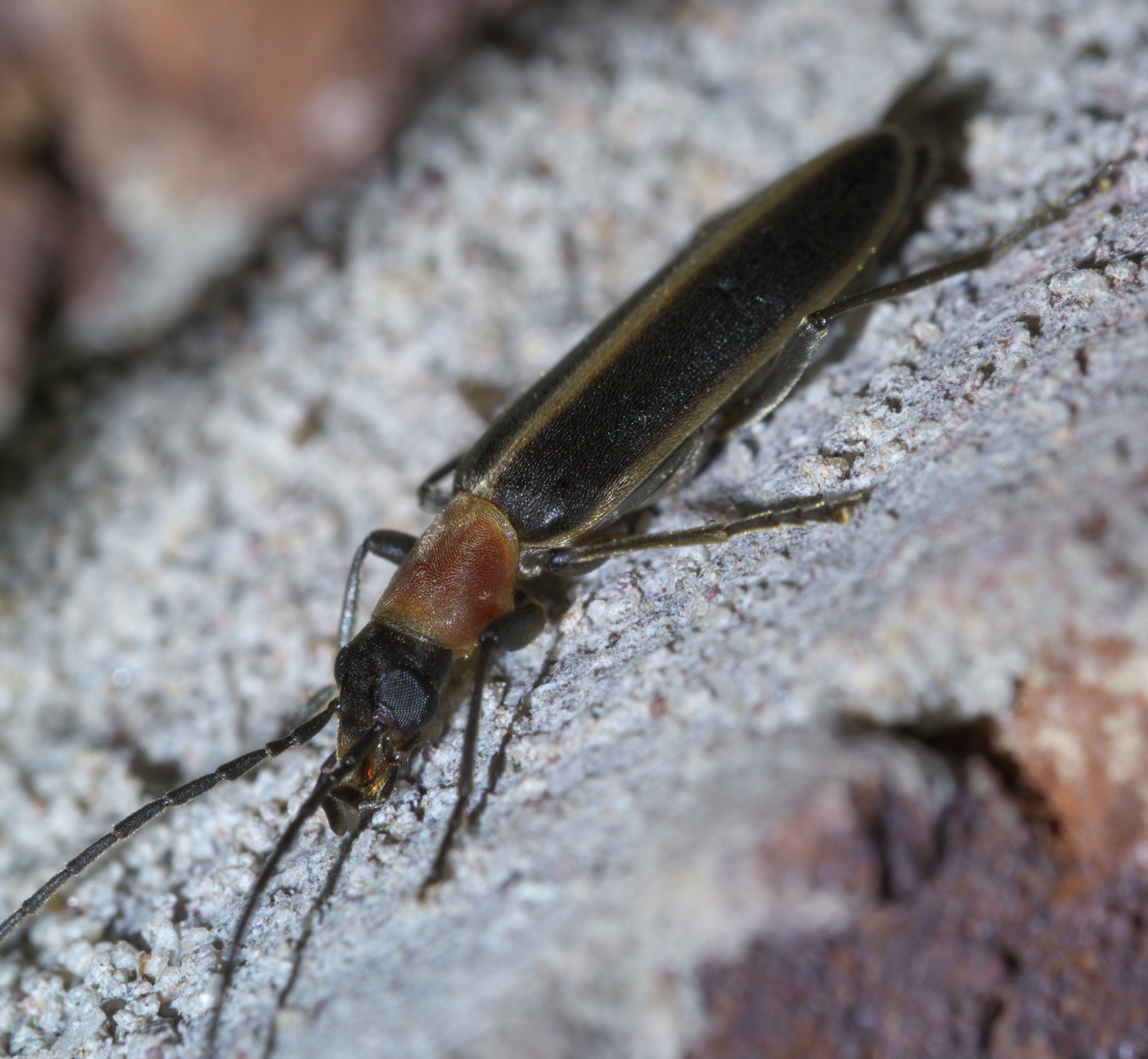

Scientific classification
- Domain: Eukaryota
- Kingdom: Animalia
- Phylum: Arthropoda
- Class: Insecta
- Order: Coleoptera
- Suborder: Polyphaga
- Infraorder: Cucujiformia
- Family: Oedemeridae
- Tribe: Asclerini
- Genus: Oxycopis
- Species: O. mimetica

Binomial name
- Oxycopis mimetica (Horn, 1896)

= Oxycopis mimetica =

Species of beetle

Oxycopis mimetica is a species of false blister beetle in the family Oedemeridae. It is found in North America.

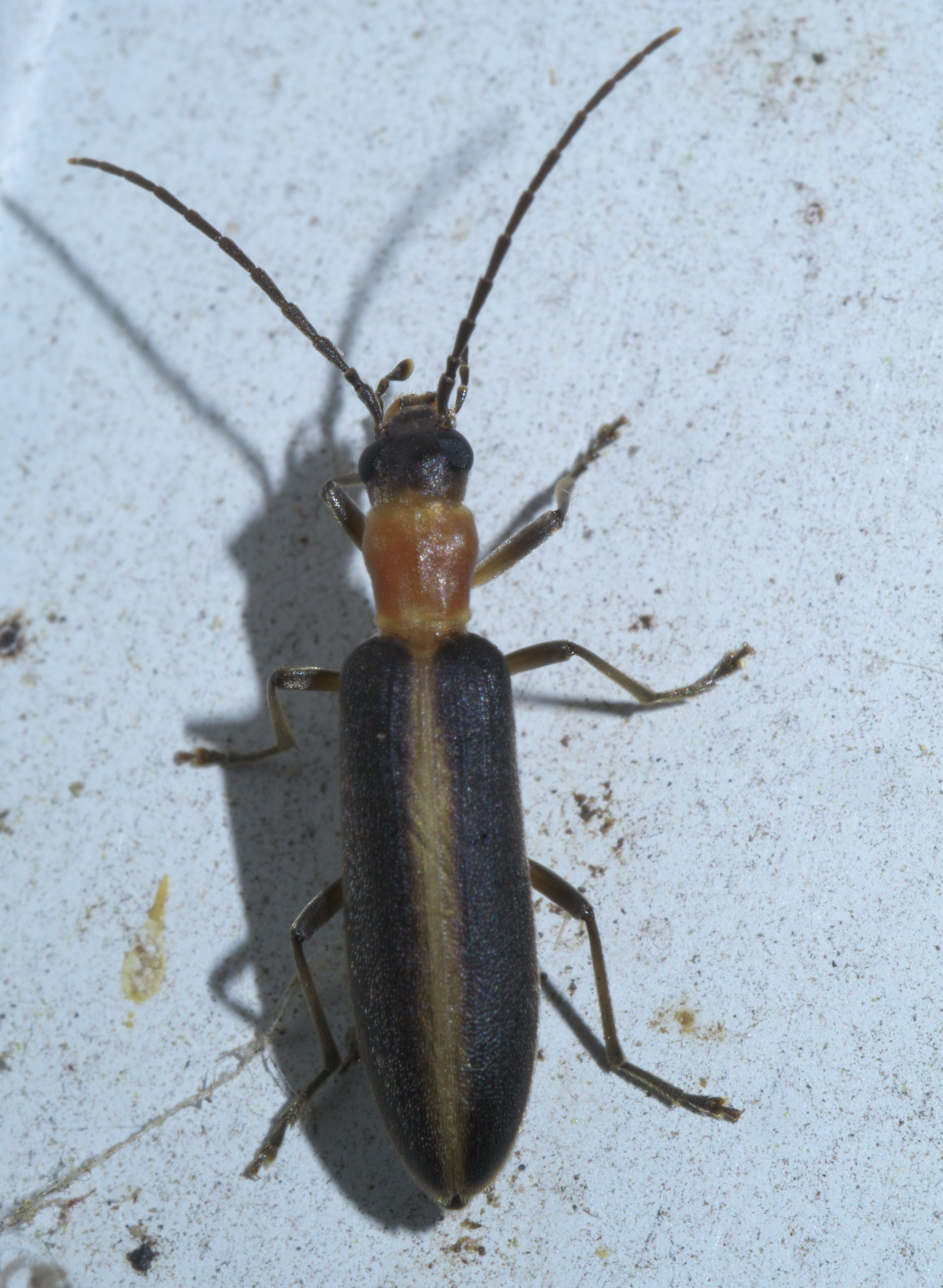
