= Eumecomera cyanipennis =

Scientific classification
- Domain: Eukaryota
- Kingdom: Animalia
- Phylum: Arthropoda
- Class: Insecta
- Order: Coleoptera
- Suborder: Polyphaga
- Infraorder: Cucujiformia
- Family: Oedemeridae
- Tribe: Asclerini
- Genus: Eumecomera
- Species: E. cyanipennis

Binomial name
- Eumecomera cyanipennis (Horn, 1870)

Species of beetle

Eumecomera cyanipennis is a species of false blister beetle in the family Oedemeridae which can be found in North America.
