= Paroxacis interrita =

Scientific classification
- Domain: Eukaryota
- Kingdom: Animalia
- Phylum: Arthropoda
- Class: Insecta
- Order: Coleoptera
- Suborder: Polyphaga
- Infraorder: Cucujiformia
- Family: Oedemeridae
- Tribe: Asclerini
- Genus: Paroxacis
- Species: P. interrita

Binomial name
- Paroxacis interrita (Arnett, 1951)

Species of beetle

Paroxacis interrita is a species of false blister beetle in the family Oedemeridae. It is found in North America.
