= Xanthochroina bicolor =

Scientific classification
- Kingdom: Animalia
- Phylum: Arthropoda
- Class: Insecta
- Order: Coleoptera
- Suborder: Polyphaga
- Infraorder: Cucujiformia
- Family: Oedemeridae
- Tribe: Asclerini
- Genus: Xanthochroina
- Species: X. bicolor

Binomial name
- Xanthochroina bicolor (LeConte, 1851)

Species of beetle

Xanthochroina bicolor is a species of false blister beetle in the family Oedemeridae. It is found in North America.
