= Eumecomera obscura =

Scientific classification
- Domain: Eukaryota
- Kingdom: Animalia
- Phylum: Arthropoda
- Class: Insecta
- Order: Coleoptera
- Suborder: Polyphaga
- Infraorder: Cucujiformia
- Family: Oedemeridae
- Tribe: Asclerini
- Genus: Eumecomera
- Species: E. obscura

Binomial name
- Eumecomera obscura (LeConte, 1854)

Species of beetle

Eumecomera obscura is a species of false blister beetle in the family Oedemeridae. It is found in Central America and North America.
