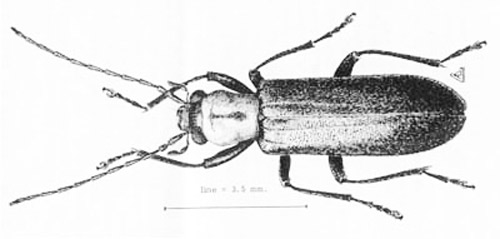

Scientific classification
- Kingdom: Animalia
- Phylum: Arthropoda
- Clade: Pancrustacea
- Class: Insecta
- Order: Coleoptera
- Suborder: Polyphaga
- Infraorder: Cucujiformia
- Family: Oedemeridae
- Tribe: Asclerini
- Genus: Oxycopis
- Species: O. mcdonaldi

Binomial name
- Oxycopis mcdonaldi (Arnett, 1951)

= Oxycopis mcdonaldi =

Species of beetle

Oxycopis mcdonaldi is a species of false blister beetle in the family Oedemeridae. It is found in the Caribbean and North America.
