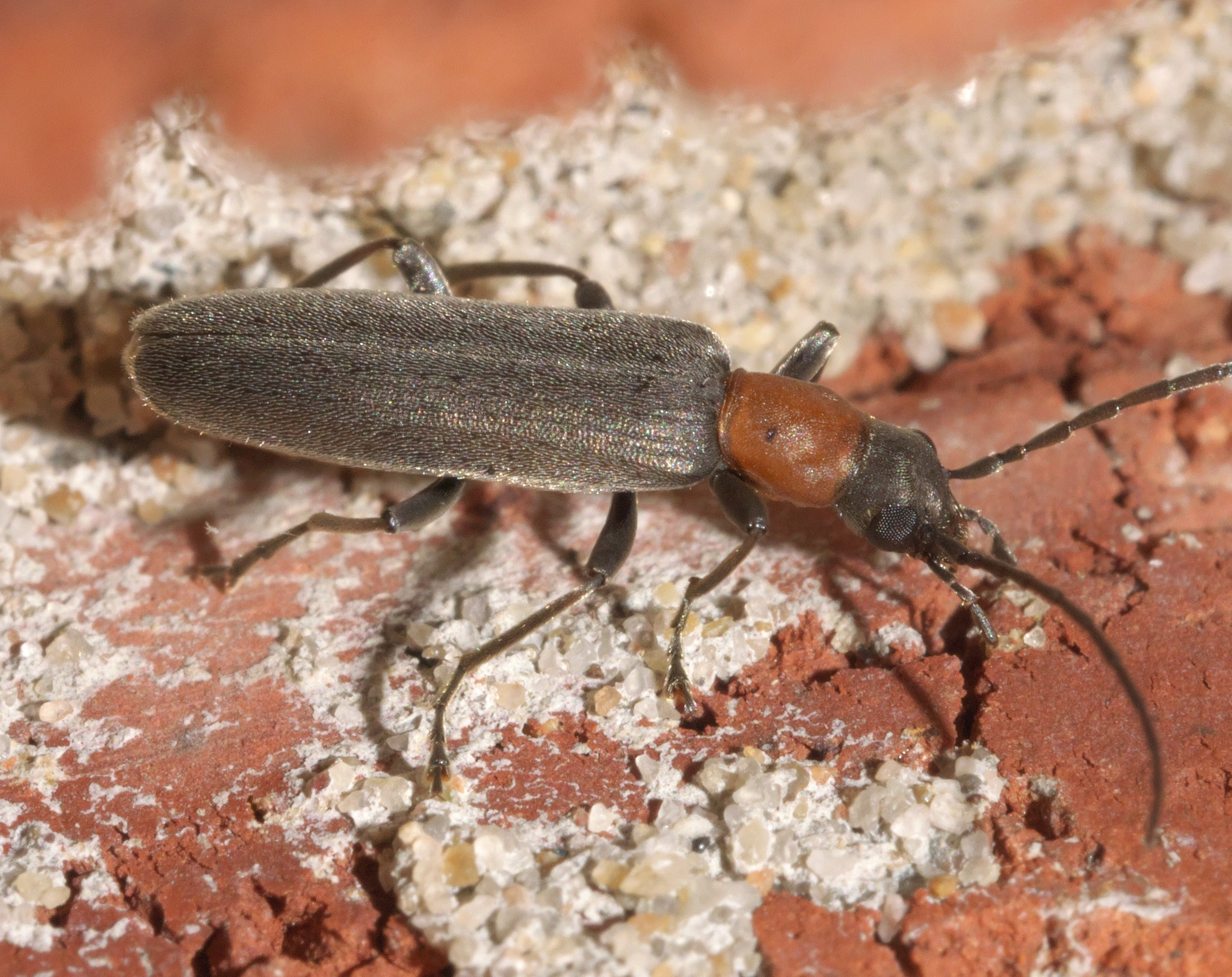
- Oxycopis thoracica, Oklahoma

Scientific classification
- Kingdom: Animalia
- Phylum: Arthropoda
- Clade: Pancrustacea
- Class: Insecta
- Order: Coleoptera
- Suborder: Polyphaga
- Infraorder: Cucujiformia
- Family: Oedemeridae
- Genus: Oxycopis
- Species: O. thoracica

Binomial name
- Oxycopis thoracica (Fabricius, 1801)

= Oxycopis thoracica =

Species of beetle

Oxycopis thoracica is a species of false blister beetle in the family Oedemeridae. It is found in the Caribbean and North America.
