= Dryopomera ceylonica =

Scientific classification
- Kingdom: Animalia
- Phylum: Arthropoda
- Clade: Pancrustacea
- Class: Insecta
- Order: Coleoptera
- Suborder: Polyphaga
- Infraorder: Cucujiformia
- Family: Oedemeridae
- Genus: Dryopomera
- Species: D. ceylonica

Binomial name
- Dryopomera ceylonica Svihla, 1994

Species of beetle

Dryopomera ceylonica is a species of false blister beetle found in Sri Lanka.
