= Xanthochroa lateralis =

Scientific classification
- Kingdom: Animalia
- Phylum: Arthropoda
- Class: Insecta
- Order: Coleoptera
- Suborder: Polyphaga
- Infraorder: Cucujiformia
- Family: Oedemeridae
- Genus: Xanthochroa
- Species: X. lateralis

Binomial name
- Xanthochroa lateralis (Melsheimer, 1846)

Species of beetle

Xanthochroa lateralis is a species of false blister beetle in the family Oedemeridae. It is found in North America.
