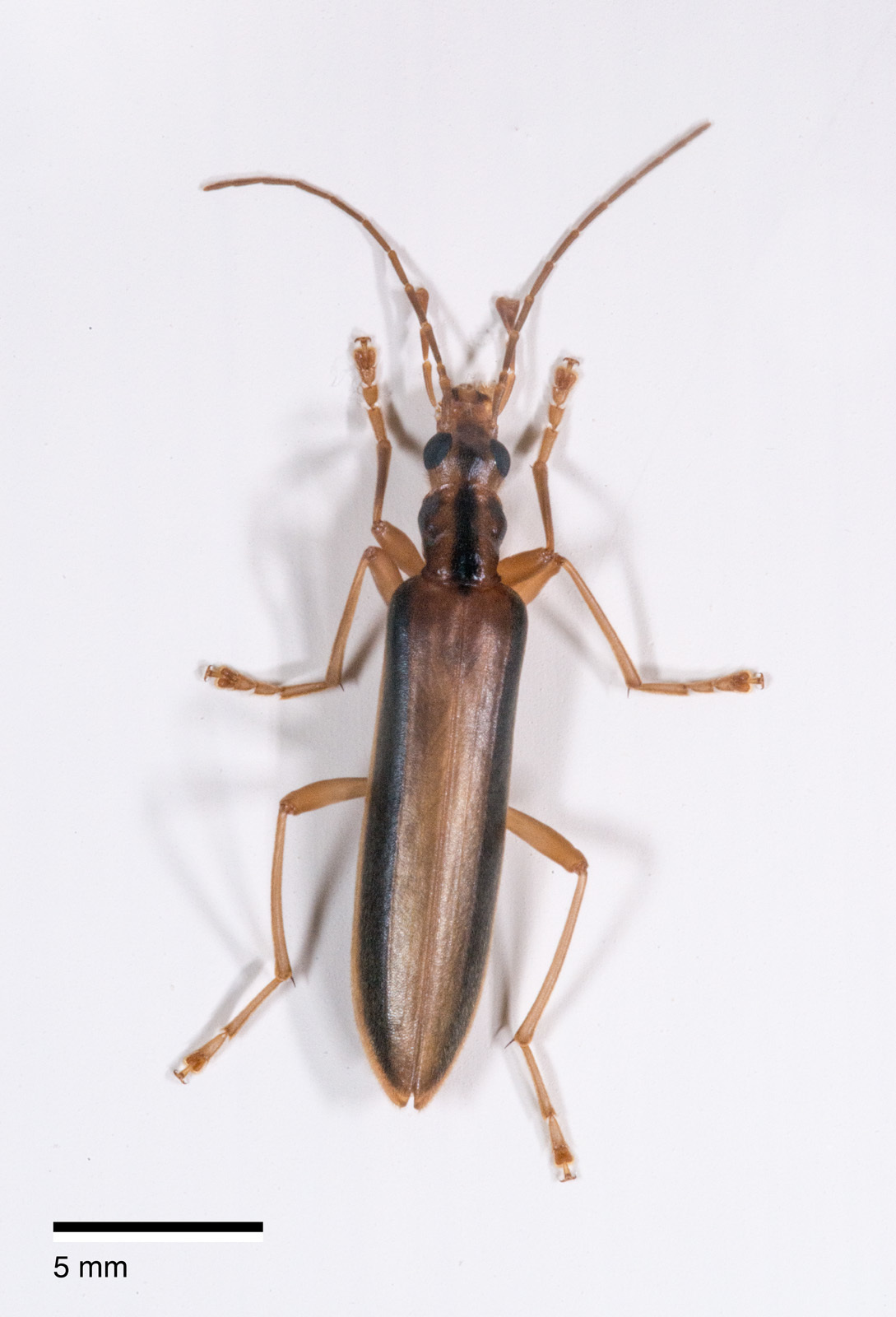

Scientific classification
- Kingdom: Animalia
- Phylum: Arthropoda
- Clade: Pancrustacea
- Class: Insecta
- Order: Coleoptera
- Suborder: Polyphaga
- Infraorder: Cucujiformia
- Family: Oedemeridae
- Genus: Thelyphassa
- Species: T. lineata

Binomial name
- Thelyphassa lineata (Fabricius, 1775)

= Thelyphassa lineata =

Species of insect

Thelyphassa lineata, the striped lax beetle, is a species of false blister beetle endemic to New Zealand.

== Description ==
Adults of the species are 15 mm long. The body is a golden-brown colour with two black stripes along either side of the abdomen and a single black stripe along the pronotum.

== Behaviour and diet ==
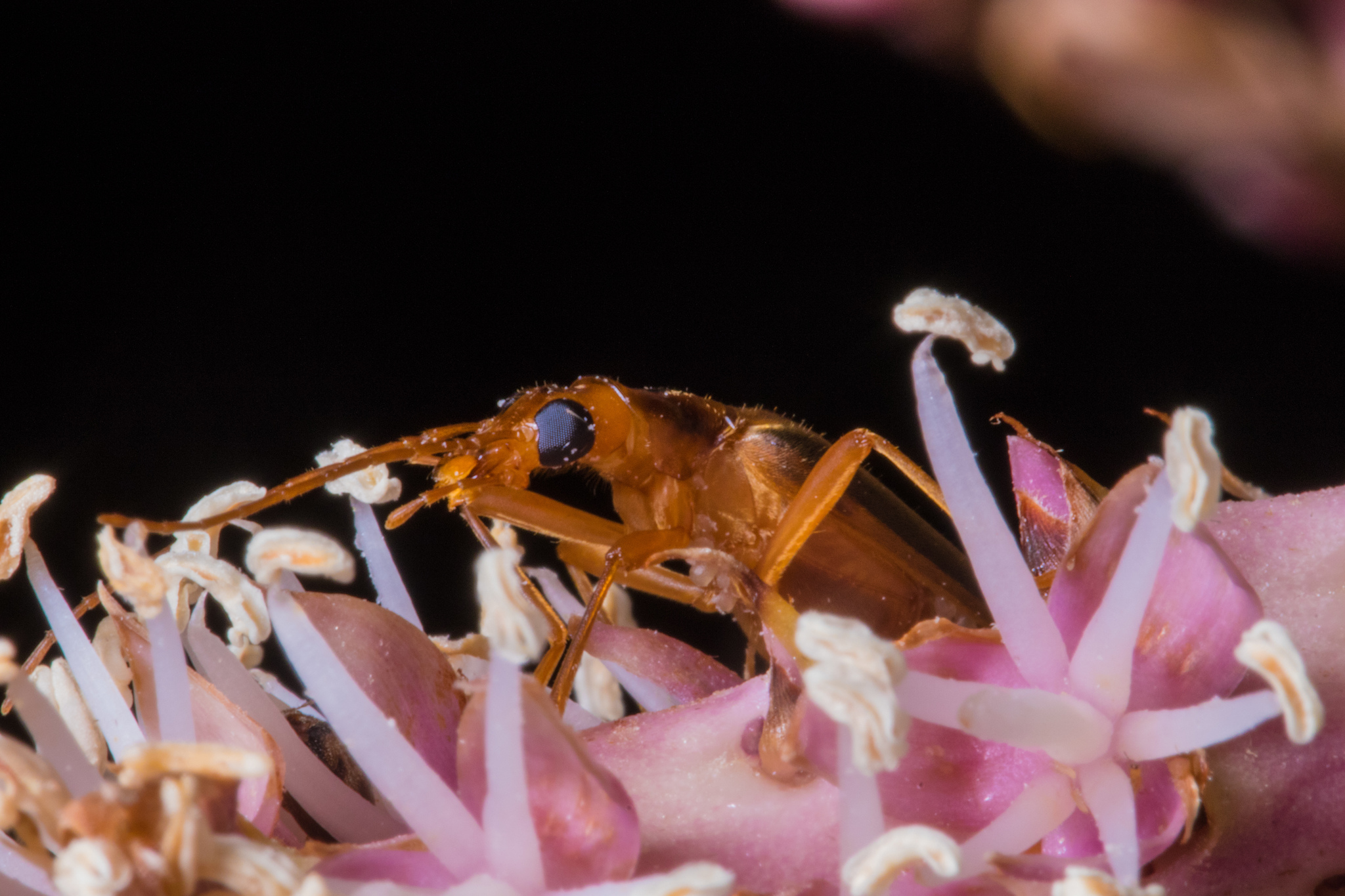
Thelyphassa lineata on flower

The grub of this species live in rotten forest logs. Adults are thought to feed on pollen and nectar.

== Toxicology ==
The striped lax beetle secretes cantharidin, a burn agent that causes skin blisters on contact. This was first observed in the late 1980s when 74 personnel from the New Zealand Army reported blistered skin after coming into contact with the species.
