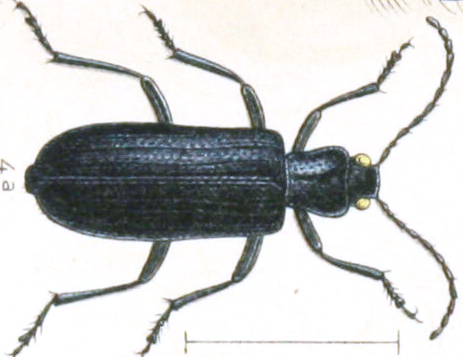
- Ditylus laevis

Scientific classification
- Domain: Eukaryota
- Kingdom: Animalia
- Phylum: Arthropoda
- Class: Insecta
- Order: Coleoptera
- Suborder: Polyphaga
- Infraorder: Cucujiformia
- Family: Oedemeridae
- Subfamily: Oedemerinae
- Tribe: Ditylini
- Genus: Ditylus; Fischer, 1817

= Ditylus =

Genus of beetles

Ditylus is a genus of false blister beetles in the family Oedemeridae. There are at least four described species in Ditylus.

== Species ==
These four species belong to the genus Ditylus:

- Ditylus caeruleus (Randall, 1838)^{i c g b}
- Ditylus gracilis LeConte, 1854^{i c g b}
- Ditylus laevis (Fabricius, 1787)^{g}
- Ditylus quadricollis (LeConte, 1851)^{i c g b}

Data sources: i = ITIS, c = Catalogue of Life, g = GBIF, b = Bugguide.net
