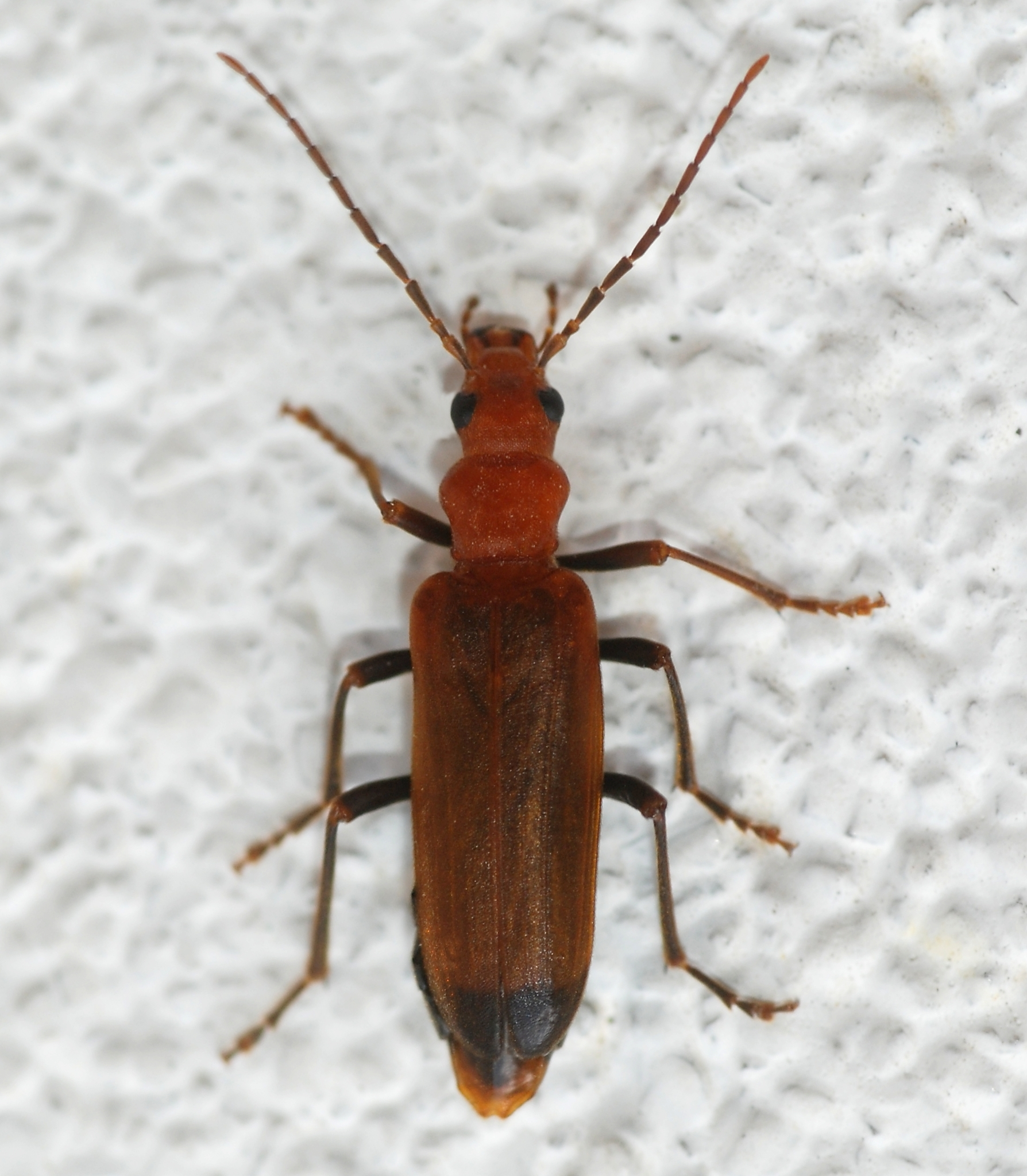
- Nacerdes melanura

Scientific classification
- Kingdom: Animalia
- Phylum: Arthropoda
- Class: Insecta
- Order: Coleoptera
- Suborder: Polyphaga
- Infraorder: Cucujiformia
- Family: Oedemeridae
- Subfamily: Oedemerinae
- Tribe: Nacerdini
- Genus: Nacerdes; Dejean, 1834

= Nacerdes =

Genus of beetles

Nacerdes is a genus of false blister beetles in the family Oedemeridae. There are about 40 described species in Nacerdes.

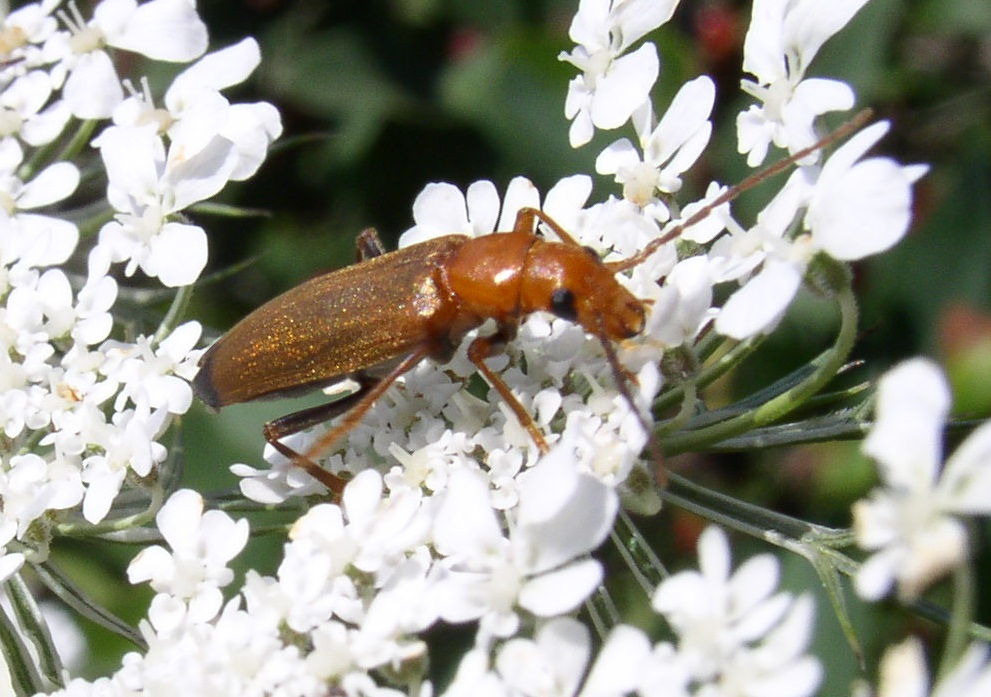
Nacerdes melanura

== Species ==
These 15 species belong to the genus Nacerdes:

- Nacerdes akiyamai Svihla, 1998
- Nacerdes apicalis (Kono, 1932)
- Nacerdes apicipennis Svihla, 1998
- Nacerdes arcuata Tian, Ren & Li, 2014
- Nacerdes baibarana (Kono, 1932)
- Nacerdes carniolica (Gistl, 1834)
- Nacerdes gracilis (W.L.E.Schmidt, 1846)
- Nacerdes hesperica (Magistretti, 1941)
- Nacerdes hiromichii Svihla, 2004
- Nacerdes kantneri Svihla, 2001
- Nacerdes konoi
- Nacerdes melanura (Linnaeus, 1758) (wharf borer)
- Nacerdes raymondi (Mulsant & Godart, 1860)
- Nacerdes taiwana (Kono, 1932)
- Nacerdes transfertalis Svihla, 1998
