= Ditylus caeruleus =

Scientific classification
- Domain: Eukaryota
- Kingdom: Animalia
- Phylum: Arthropoda
- Class: Insecta
- Order: Coleoptera
- Suborder: Polyphaga
- Infraorder: Cucujiformia
- Family: Oedemeridae
- Genus: Ditylus
- Species: D. caeruleus

Binomial name
- Ditylus caeruleus (Randall, 1838)

Species of beetle

Ditylus caeruleus is a species of false blister beetle in the family Oedemeridae. It is found in North America.
