= Oxycopis notoxoides =

Scientific classification
- Domain: Eukaryota
- Kingdom: Animalia
- Phylum: Arthropoda
- Class: Insecta
- Order: Coleoptera
- Suborder: Polyphaga
- Infraorder: Cucujiformia
- Family: Oedemeridae
- Genus: Oxycopis
- Species: O. notoxoides

Binomial name
- Oxycopis notoxoides (Fabricius, 1801)

Species of beetle

Oxycopis notoxoides is a species of false blister beetle in the family Oedemeridae. It is found in Central America and North America.
