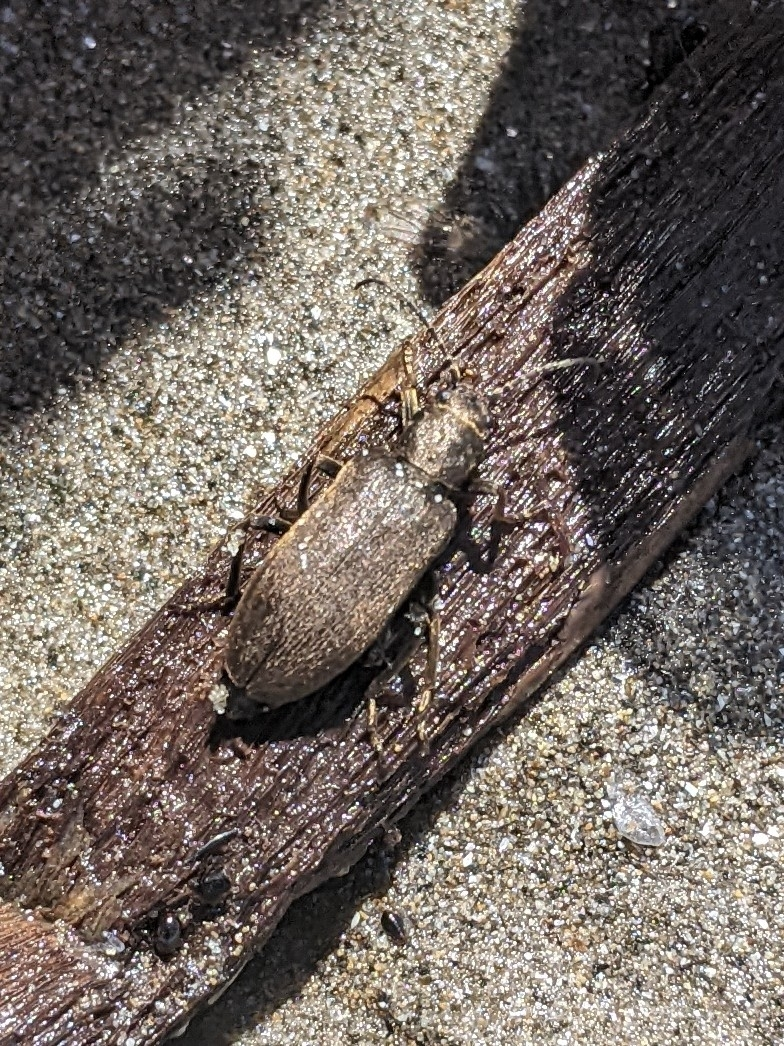
- Ditylus quadricollis at Cannon Beach, Oregon

Scientific classification
- Kingdom: Animalia
- Phylum: Arthropoda
- Class: Insecta
- Order: Coleoptera
- Suborder: Polyphaga
- Infraorder: Cucujiformia
- Family: Oedemeridae
- Genus: Ditylus
- Species: D. quadricollis

Binomial name
- Ditylus quadricollis (LeConte, 1851)

= Ditylus quadricollis =

Species of beetle

Ditylus quadricollis is a species of false blister beetle in the family Oedemeridae. It is found in North America.
