= Xanthochroa marina =

Scientific classification
- Domain: Eukaryota
- Kingdom: Animalia
- Phylum: Arthropoda
- Class: Insecta
- Order: Coleoptera
- Suborder: Polyphaga
- Infraorder: Cucujiformia
- Family: Oedemeridae
- Subfamily: Nacerdinae
- Genus: Xanthochroa
- Species: X. marina

Binomial name
- Xanthochroa marina Horn, 1896

Species of beetle

Xanthochroa marina is a species of false blister beetle in the family Oedemeridae. It is found in North America.
