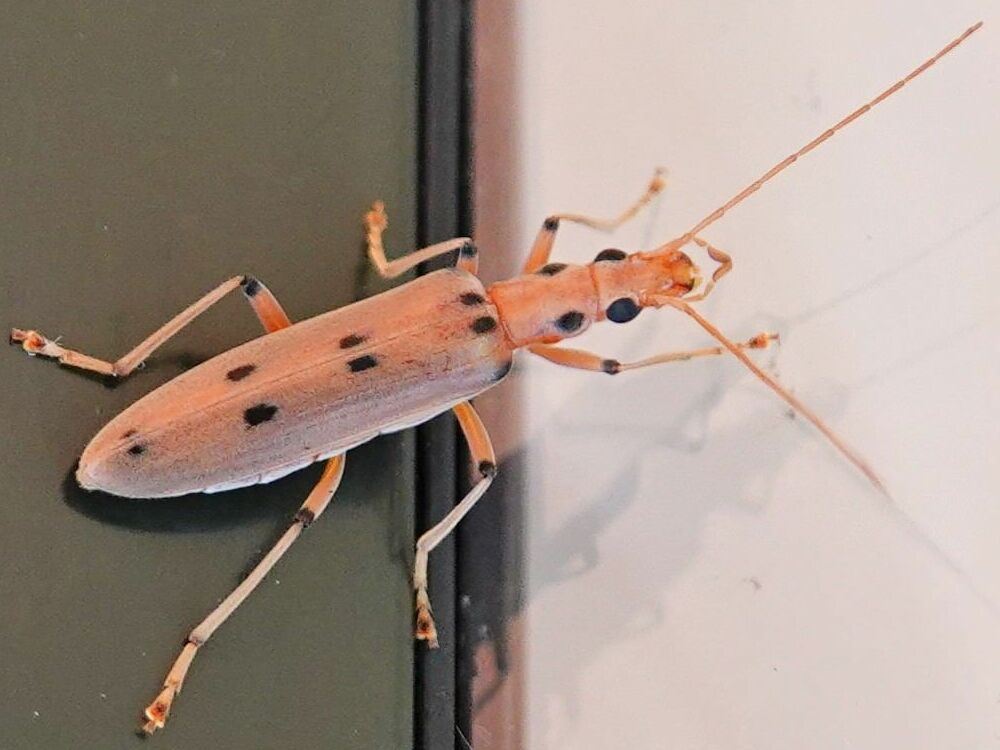
- Introduced Parisopalpus nigronotatus seen in West Auckland, New Zealand

Scientific classification
- Kingdom: Animalia
- Phylum: Arthropoda
- Clade: Pancrustacea
- Class: Insecta
- Order: Coleoptera
- Suborder: Polyphaga
- Infraorder: Cucujiformia
- Family: Oedemeridae
- Genus: Parisopalpus
- Species: P. nigronotatus

Binomial name
- Parisopalpus nigronotatus Boheman, 1858

Synonyms
- Parisopalpus nigronotatus Boheman, 1858); Nacerdes nigronotata Boheman, 1858; Ananca ni!fronotata Masters. 1859; Copidita nigronotata Champion, 1895; Sessinia stictica Broun, 1914; Sessinia nigronotata Schenkling, 1915

= Parisopalpus nigronotatus =

Species of beetle

Parisopalpus nigronotatus, known by its common name, the spotted lax beetle, is a species of false blister beetles. It was first identified by Carl Henrik Boheman in 1858, under the name Nacerdes nigronotata. Native to eastern Australia, the species was introduced to New Zealand in 1931.

== Description ==
Parisopalpus nigronotatus is generally coloured brick-red, with dark spots found on the beetle's body and legs. The species is densely covered with pale hair. The beetle is typically between 8.7 and 12.2 mm in length.

Parisopalpus nigronotatus can be told apart from other species of Parisopalpus by the presence of at least two dark spots on the beetle's body.

== Distribution ==
Parisopalpus nigronotatus is found in eastern Australia, south-eastern Australia and Tasmania. It was introduced to New Zealand in 1931, and is found in Nelson and the North Island.

The species has been intercepted by biosecurity in Chile.

== Behaviour ==
The beetles lay their eggs in mangroves. Grubs of the species are typically found in rotting wood, and as adults the beetles feed on nectar and pollen, and are attracted to light.

The beetles secrete a toxic substance as a defense, which causes skin blisters in humans if touched.
