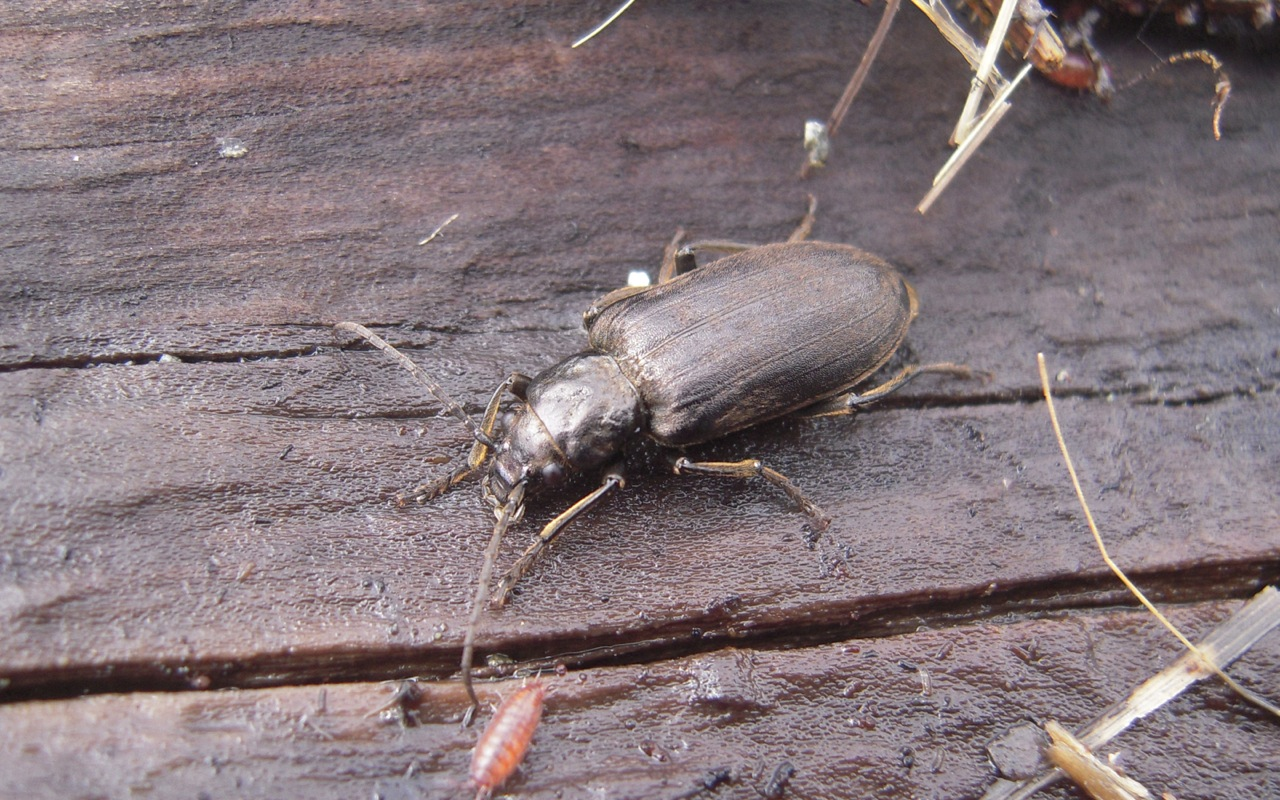

Scientific classification
- Domain: Eukaryota
- Kingdom: Animalia
- Phylum: Arthropoda
- Class: Insecta
- Order: Coleoptera
- Suborder: Polyphaga
- Infraorder: Cucujiformia
- Family: Oedemeridae
- Genus: Ditylus
- Species: D. gracilis

Binomial name
- Ditylus gracilis LeConte, 1854

= Ditylus gracilis =

Species of beetle

Ditylus gracilis is a species of false blister beetle in the family Oedemeridae. It is found in North America.
