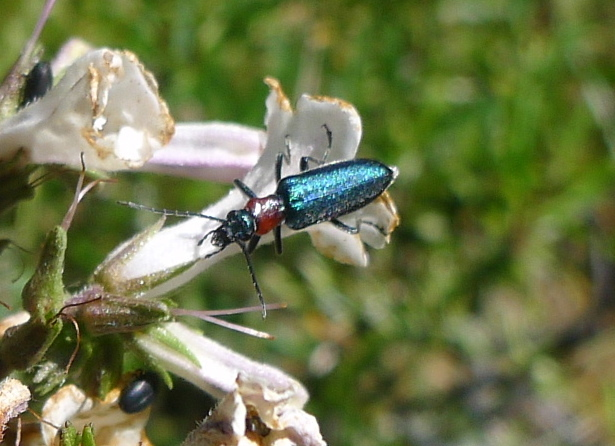
- Eumecomera bicolor, California

Scientific classification
- Domain: Eukaryota
- Kingdom: Animalia
- Phylum: Arthropoda
- Class: Insecta
- Order: Coleoptera
- Suborder: Polyphaga
- Infraorder: Cucujiformia
- Family: Oedemeridae
- Subfamily: Oedemerinae
- Tribe: Asclerini
- Genus: Eumecomera; Arnett, 1951

= Eumecomera =

Genus of beetles

Eumecomera is a genus of false blister beetles in the family Oedemeridae. There are at least three described species in Eumecomera.

== Species ==
These three species belong to the genus Eumecomera:

- Eumecomera bicolor (Horn, 1870)
- Eumecomera cyanipennis (Horn, 1870)
- Eumecomera obscura (LeConte, 1854)
