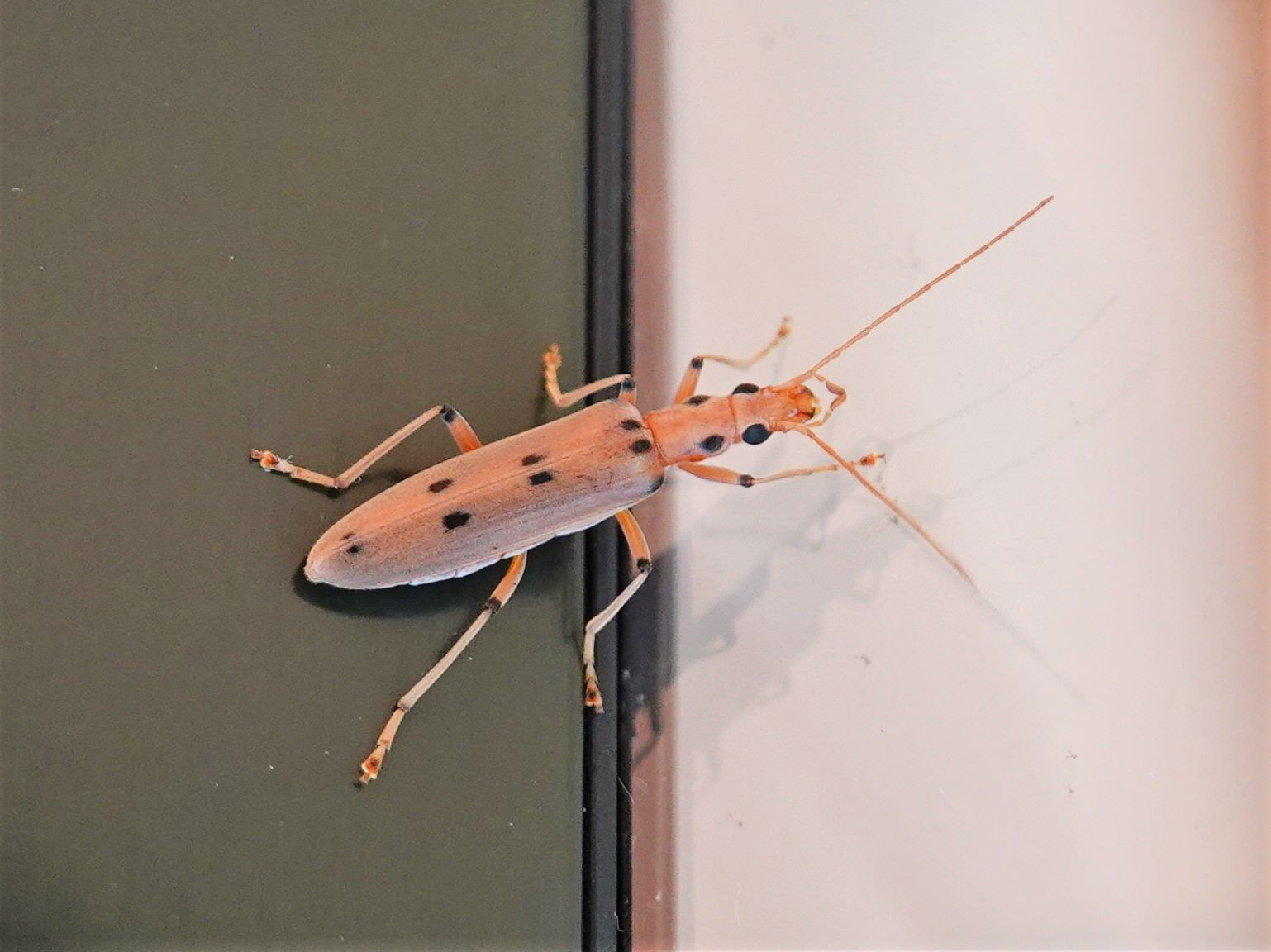
- Parisopalpus nigronotatus

Scientific classification
- Domain: Eukaryota
- Kingdom: Animalia
- Phylum: Arthropoda
- Class: Insecta
- Order: Coleoptera
- Suborder: Polyphaga
- Infraorder: Cucujiformia
- Family: Oedemeridae
- Subfamily: Oedemerinae
- Tribe: Asclerini
- Genus: Parisopalpus; Hudson, 1975

Type species
- Parisopalpus thoracicus

= Parisopalpus =

Genus of insects

Parisopalpus is a genus of false blister beetles in the family Oedemeridae. The genus was first identified by Logan Hudson in 1975, who separated the group from Sessinia due to the presence of bifid mandibles, and n males of the species visible genitalia.

Species are primarily found in Australia and New Zealand. In 2012, a new species was identified in Chile, Parisopalpus defoei.

== Species ==
Currently four species belong to the genus Parisopalpus.

- Parisopalpus defoei (Švihla & Fischer, 2012)
- Parisopalpus macleayi (Champion, 1895)
- Parisopalpus nigronotatus (Boheman, 1858)
- Parisopalpus thoracicus (Broun, 1893)

== Gallery ==
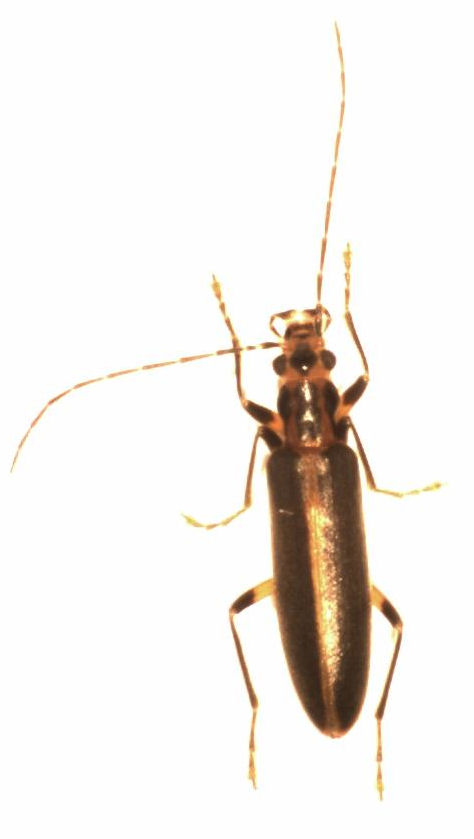
Parisopalpus macleayi

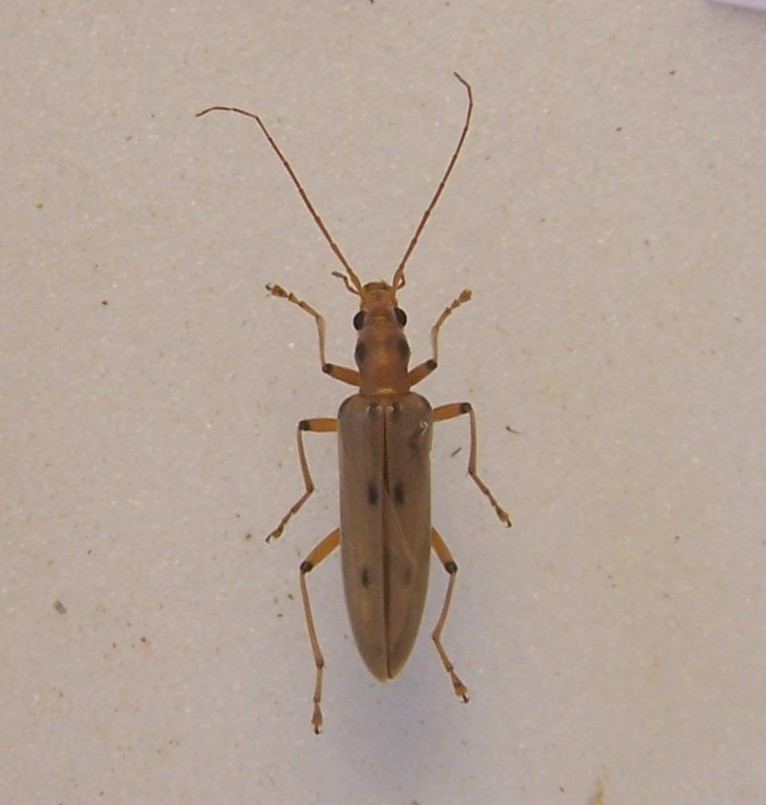
Parisopalpus nigronotatus

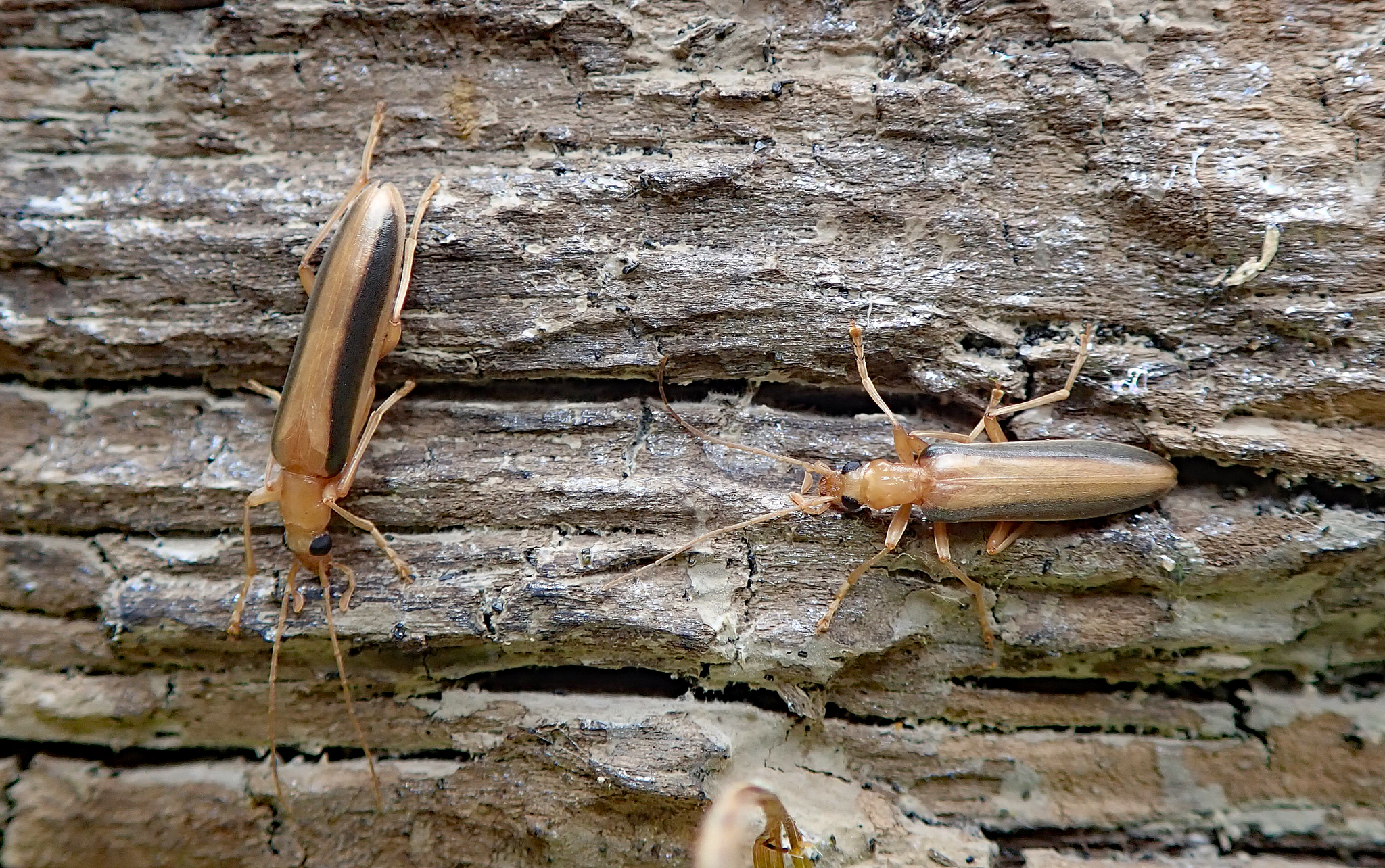
Parisopalpus thoracicus
