= Xanthochroina =

Scientific classification
- Domain: Eukaryota
- Kingdom: Animalia
- Phylum: Arthropoda
- Class: Insecta
- Order: Coleoptera
- Suborder: Polyphaga
- Infraorder: Cucujiformia
- Family: Oedemeridae
- Subfamily: Oedemerinae
- Tribe: Asclerini
- Genus: Xanthochroina; Ganglbauer, 1881

Genus of beetles

Xanthochroina is a genus of false blister beetles in the family Oedemeridae. There are at least three described species in Xanthochroina.

== Species ==
These three species belong to the genus Xanthochroina:

- Xanthochroina auberti (Abeille de Perrin, 1876)
- Xanthochroina bicolor (LeConte, 1851)
- Xanthochroina tarsalis (Kono, 1937)
