= Rhinoplatia =

Scientific classification
- Domain: Eukaryota
- Kingdom: Animalia
- Phylum: Arthropoda
- Class: Insecta
- Order: Coleoptera
- Suborder: Polyphaga
- Infraorder: Cucujiformia
- Family: Oedemeridae
- Subfamily: Oedemerinae
- Tribe: Asclerini
- Genus: Rhinoplatia; Horn, 1868

Genus of beetles

Rhinoplatia is a genus of false blister beetles in the family Oedemeridae. There are at least two described species in Rhinoplatia.

== Species ==
These two species belong to the genus Rhinoplatia:

- Rhinoplatia mortivallicola Arnett, 1947
- Rhinoplatia ruficollis Horn, 1868
