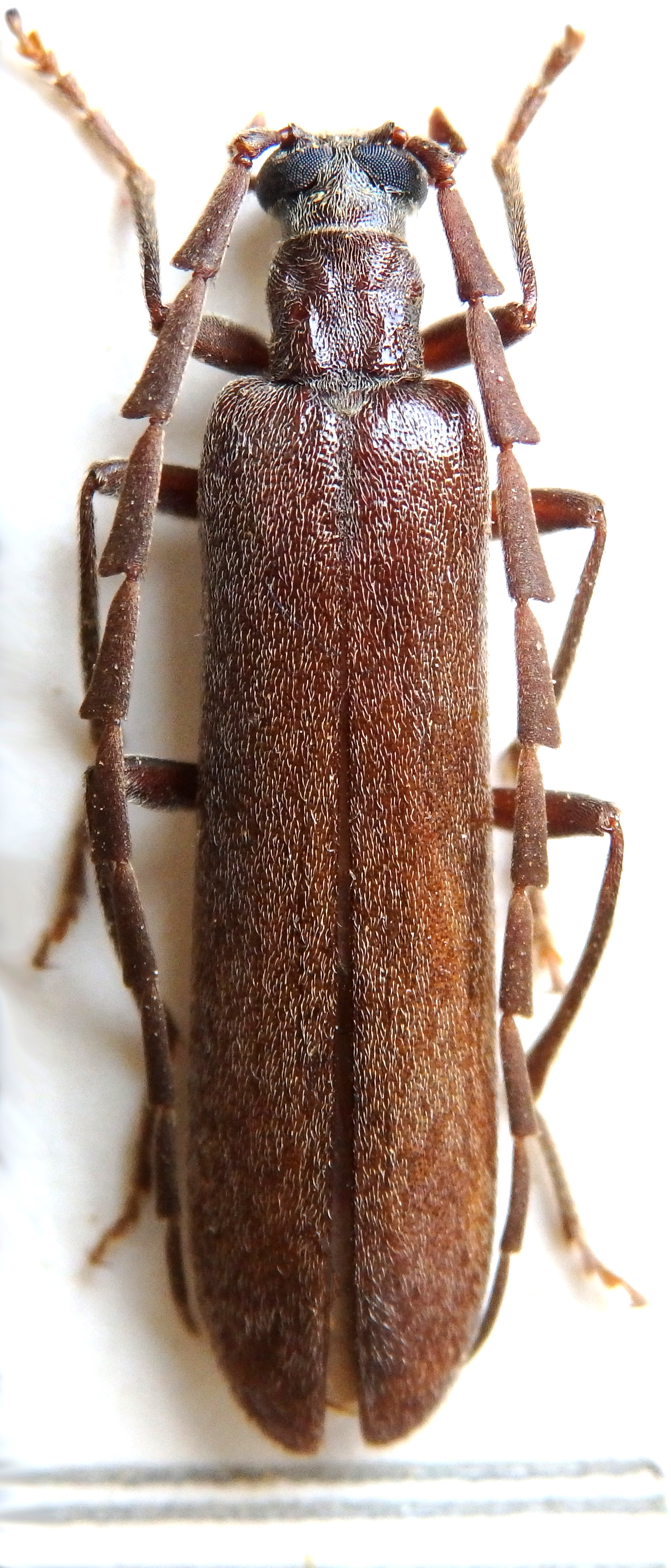
- Calopus serraticornis

Scientific classification
- Domain: Eukaryota
- Kingdom: Animalia
- Phylum: Arthropoda
- Class: Insecta
- Order: Coleoptera
- Suborder: Polyphaga
- Infraorder: Cucujiformia
- Family: Oedemeridae
- Subfamily: Calopodinae
- Genus: Calopus; Fabricius, 1775

= Calopus (beetle) =

Genus of beetles

Calopus is a genus of false blister beetles in the family Oedemeridae. There is at least one described species in Calopus, C. angustus.
