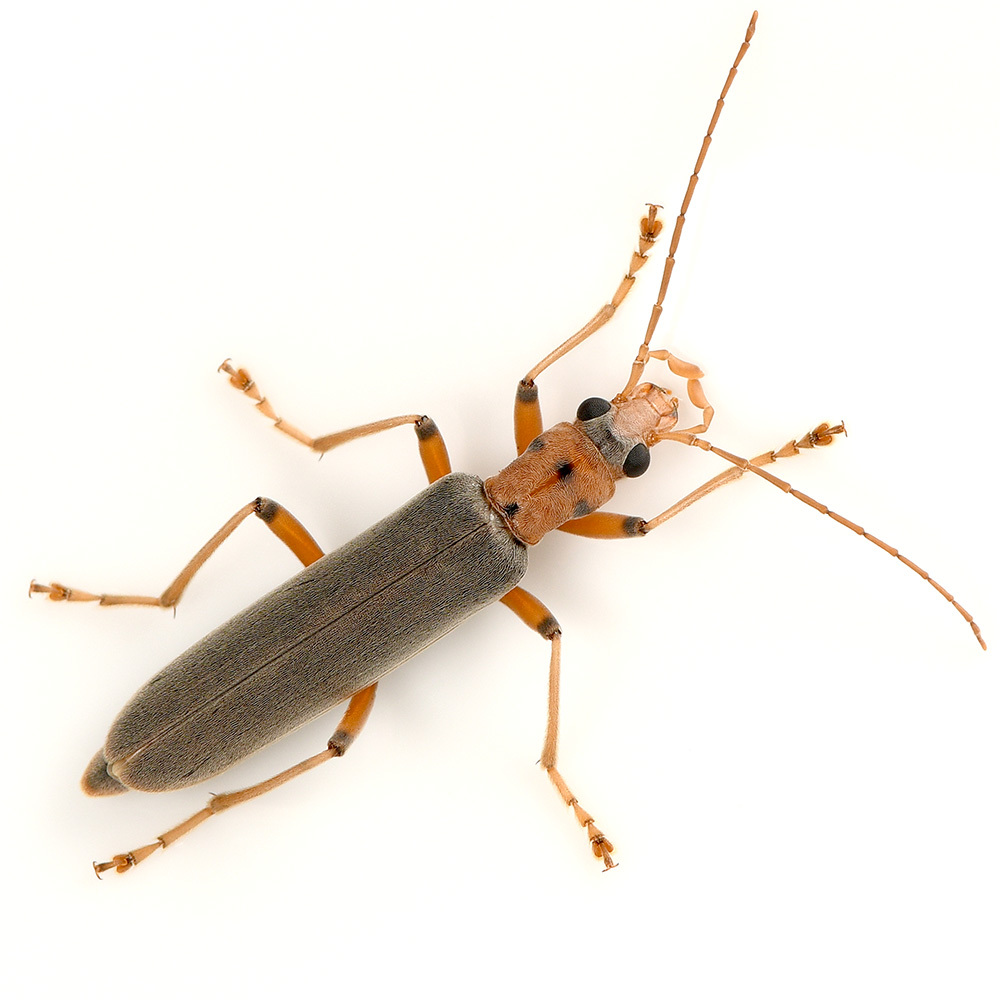
- Copidita quadrimaculata

Scientific classification
- Kingdom: Animalia
- Phylum: Arthropoda
- Class: Insecta
- Order: Coleoptera
- Suborder: Polyphaga
- Infraorder: Cucujiformia
- Family: Oedemeridae
- Tribe: Asclerini
- Genus: Copidita; LeConte, 1866

Species
- 43 species, including: Copidita biparticollis Pic, 1928; Copidita desecheonis Wolcott, 1950; Copidita kaszabi Pic, 1956; Copidita leveri Pic, 1935; Copidita longissima Pic, 1923 †Copidita miocenica Wickham 1914; Copidita ogloblini Pic, 1930; Copidita punctatithorax Pic, 1927; Copidita quadrimaculata (Motschulsky, 1853); Copidita saigonensis Pic, 1928; Copidita thonalmus Darlington, 1936

Synonyms
- Copodita (Pic, 1923)

= Copidita =

Copidita Temporal range: 37.2–0 Ma

Genus of beetles

Copidita is a genus of false blister beetles in the subfamily Oedemerinae. It is an extant genus with at least one fossil species described from the Florissant Eocene of Colorado.
