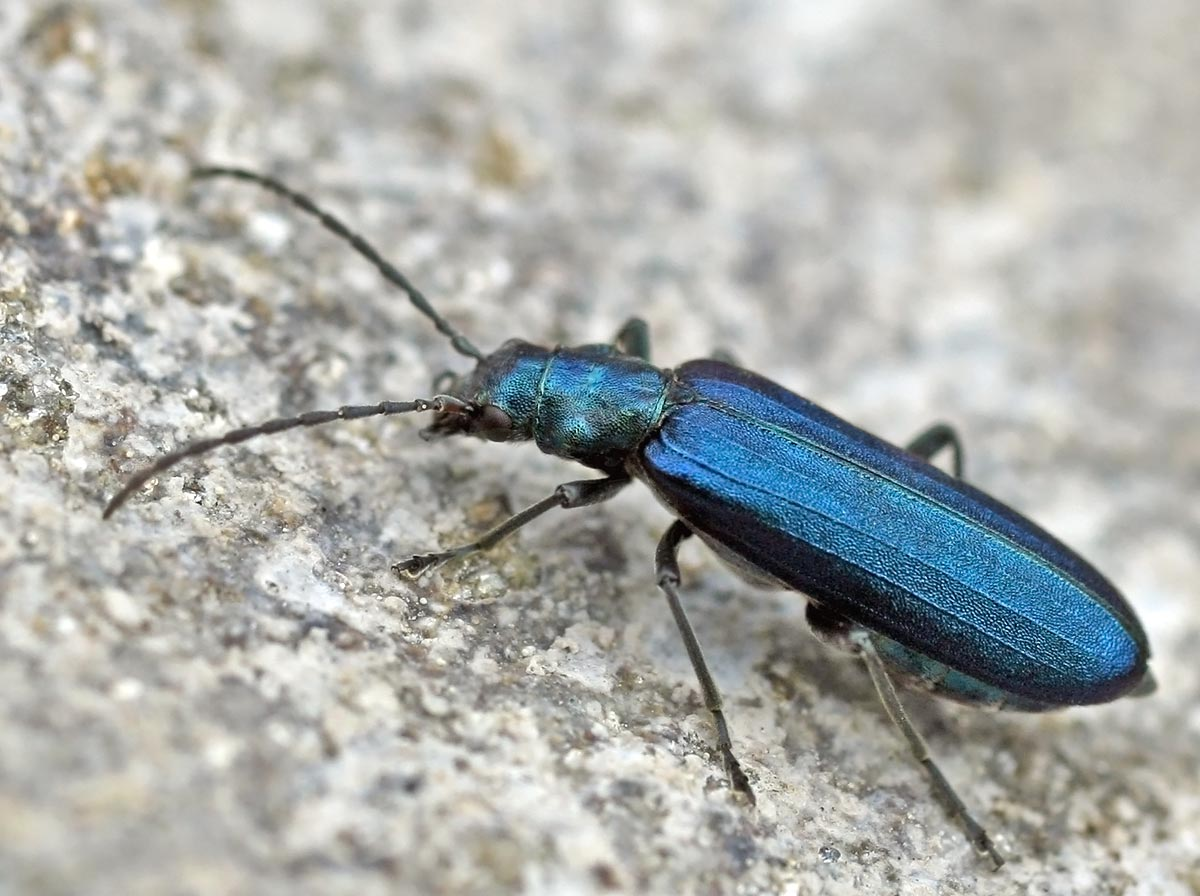
- Ischnomera cyanea

Scientific classification
- Kingdom: Animalia
- Phylum: Arthropoda
- Clade: Pancrustacea
- Class: Insecta
- Order: Coleoptera
- Suborder: Polyphaga
- Infraorder: Cucujiformia
- Family: Oedemeridae
- Subfamily: Oedemerinae; Latreille, 1810

Tribes
- Asclerini; Oedemerini; Stenostomatini

= Oedemerinae =

Subfamily of beetles

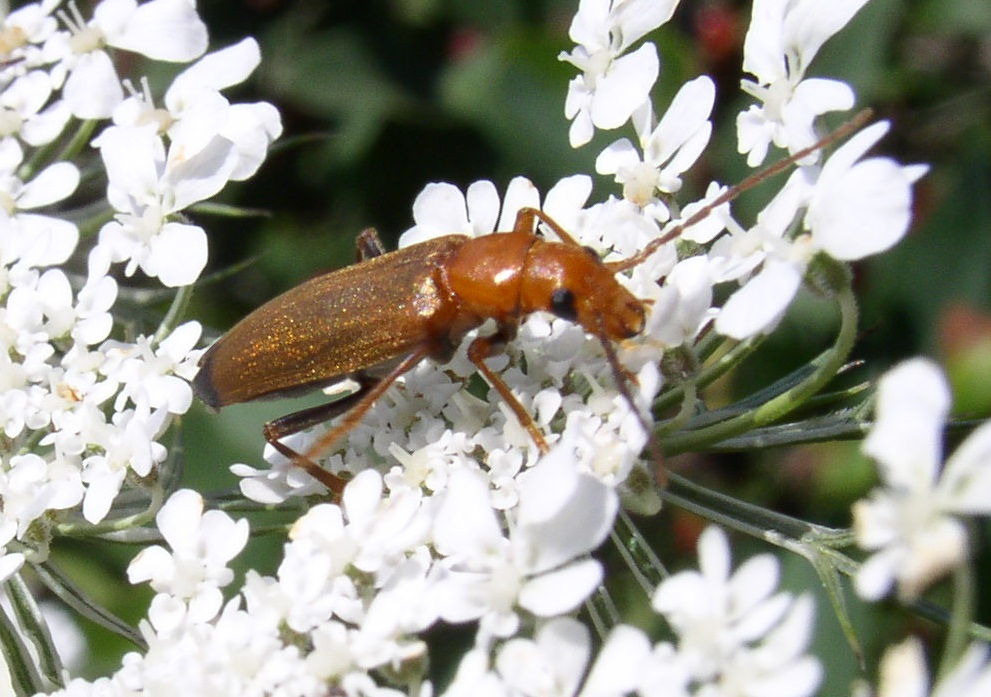
Nacerdes melanura (tribe Nacerdini).

Oedemerinae are a subfamily of the false blister beetles (family Oedemeridae), also known as pollen-feeding beetles. The Nacerdinae are sometimes merged here.

The phylogeny of this family is not robustly deduced in detail. While traditionally three tribes are accepted, one is considered monotypic and another has only two genera. Though this may well be warranted, the evolutionary relationships the Oedemerinae are generally in need of review, particularly considering the number of genera treated as basal or of entirely uncertain placement.

== Tribes and selected genera ==
The subfamily Oedemerinae contains the following genera:

Tribe Asclerini Semenov, 1894

- Afrochitona
- Alloxantha Seidlitz, 1899
- Anacerdochroa Svihla, 1986
- Ananca Fairmaire & Germain, 1863
- Apterosessinia Blair, 1926
- Asclerosibutia Pic, 1914
- Baculipalpus Broun, 1880
- Chitona W.Schmidt, 1844
- Colobostomoides Svihla, 1983
- Copidita LeConte, 1866
- Diplectrus Kirsch, 1866
- Ditylomorphula Svihla, 1986
- Ditylomorphus Svihla, 1986
- Dohrnia Malm, 1874
- Eobia Semenov, 1894
- Eumecomera Arnett, 1951
- Heliocis Arnett, 1951
- Hypasclera Kirsch, 1866
- Indasclera Svihla, 1980
- Ischnomera Stephens, 1832
- Koniaphassa Hudson, 1975
- Mecopselaphus Solier, 1849
- Melananthia Blair, 1926
- Melananthoides Vazquez, 1996
- Microsessinia Pic, 1922
- Nacatrorus Vazquez, 1996
- Nacerdochroa Reitter, 1893
- Oxacis LeConte, 1866
- Oxycopis Arnett, 1951
- Parisopalpus Hudson, 1975
- Paroxacis Arnett, 1951
- Platylytra Fairmaire & Germain, 1863
- Probosca W.Schmidt, 1846
- Pseudohyperasclera
- Pseudolycus Guérin, 1833
- Rhinoplatia Horn, 1868
- Selenopalpus White, 1846
- Sessinia Pascoe, 1863
- Sisenes Champion, 1889
- Thelyphassa Pascoe, 1876
- Vasaces Champion, 1889
- Xanthochroina Ganglbauer, 1881

Tribe Oedemerini Latreille, 1810

- Dryopomera Fairmaire, 1897
- Oedemera Olivier, 1789

Tribe Stenostomatini Mulsant, 1858

- Stenostoma Agassiz, 1850
