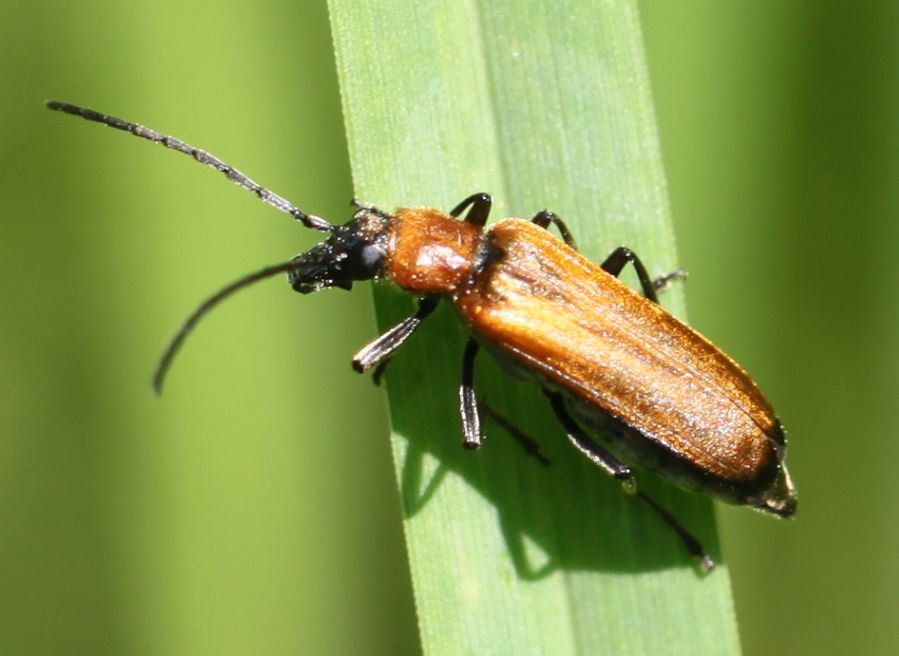
- Anogcodes melanurus

Scientific classification
- Kingdom: Animalia
- Phylum: Arthropoda
- Class: Insecta
- Order: Coleoptera
- Suborder: Polyphaga
- Infraorder: Cucujiformia
- Family: Oedemeridae
- Genus: Anogcodes; Dejean, 1834

Synonyms
- Anoncodes Dejean, 1834; Anoncodes W.L.E.Schimdt, 1834

= Anogcodes =

Genus of beetles

Anogcodes is a genus of beetle belonging to the family Oedemeridae. The species of this genus are found in Europe.

== Species ==
- Anogcodes coarctatus (Germar, 1824)
- Anogcodes difformis Marseul, 1857
- Anogcodes fulvicollis (Scopoli, 1763)
- Anogcodes melanurus (Fabricius, 1787)
- Anogcodes ruficollis (Fabricius, 1781)
- Anogcodes rufiventris (Scopoli, 1763)
- Anogcodes shatzmayri (H.Wagner, 1928)
- Anogcodes seladonius (Fabricius, 1792)
- Anogcodes ustulatus (Scopoli, 1763)
- Anogcodes wartmanni (Pic, 1894)
