= Hypasclera =

Scientific classification
- Kingdom: Animalia
- Phylum: Arthropoda
- Class: Insecta
- Order: Coleoptera
- Suborder: Polyphaga
- Infraorder: Cucujiformia
- Family: Oedemeridae
- Subfamily: Oedemerinae
- Tribe: Asclerini
- Genus: Hypasclera; Kirsch, 1866

Genus of beetles

Hypasclera is a genus of false blister beetles in the family Oedemeridae. There are about 11 described species in Hypasclera.

== Species ==
These 11 species belong to the genus Hypasclera:

- Hypasclera costata (Champion, 1896)
- Hypasclera dorsalis (Melsheimer, 1846)
- Hypasclera floridana (Horn, 1896)
- Hypasclera ignota (Arnett, 1951)
- Hypasclera megateles (Arnett, 1951)
- Hypasclera nesiotes (Arnett, 1951)
- Hypasclera nitidula (Horn, 1896)
- Hypasclera pleuralis (LeConte, 1866)
- Hypasclera pseudosericea (Arnett, 1951)
- Hypasclera simplex (Waterhouse, 1878)
- Hypasclera spinosus (Arnett, 1957)
