= Xanthochroa =

Scientific classification
- Kingdom: Animalia
- Phylum: Arthropoda
- Class: Insecta
- Order: Coleoptera
- Suborder: Polyphaga
- Infraorder: Cucujiformia
- Family: Oedemeridae
- Subfamily: Nacerdinae
- Genus: Xanthochroa; Schmidt, 1846

Genus of beetles

Xanthochroa is a genus of false blister beetles in the family Oedemeridae. There are about seven described species of Xanthochroa.

== Species ==
These seven species belong to the genus Xanthochroa:

- Xanthochroa californica Horn, 1874
- Xanthochroa centralis Horn, 1896
- Xanthochroa erythrocephala (Germar, 1824)
- Xanthochroa lateralis (Melsheimer, 1846)
- Xanthochroa marina Horn, 1896
- Xanthochroa testacea Horn, 1896
- Xanthochroa trinotata LeConte, 1866
