= Sisenes =

Scientific classification
- Domain: Eukaryota
- Kingdom: Animalia
- Phylum: Arthropoda
- Class: Insecta
- Order: Coleoptera
- Suborder: Polyphaga
- Infraorder: Cucujiformia
- Family: Oedemeridae
- Subfamily: Oedemerinae
- Tribe: Asclerini
- Genus: Sisenes; Champion, 1889

Genus of beetles

Sisenes is a genus of false blister beetles in the family Oedemeridae. There are at least two described species in Sisenes.

== Species ==
These two species belong to the genus Sisenes:

- Sisenes championi Horn, 1896
- Sisenes personatus Champion, 1890
