= Vasaces =

Scientific classification
- Domain: Eukaryota
- Kingdom: Animalia
- Phylum: Arthropoda
- Class: Insecta
- Order: Coleoptera
- Suborder: Polyphaga
- Infraorder: Cucujiformia
- Family: Oedemeridae
- Subfamily: Oedemerinae
- Tribe: Asclerini
- Genus: Vasaces; Champion, 1889

Genus of beetles

Vasaces is a genus of false blister beetles in the family Oedemeridae. There are at least four described species in Vasaces.

== Species ==
These four species belong to the genus Vasaces:

- Vasaces elongatus Arnett, 1953
- Vasaces knulli Arnett, 1953
- Vasaces linearis Arnett, 1953
- Vasaces maculatus Arnett, 1953
