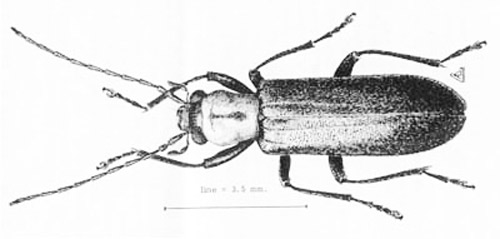
- Oxycopis mcdonaldi

Scientific classification
- Domain: Eukaryota
- Kingdom: Animalia
- Phylum: Arthropoda
- Class: Insecta
- Order: Coleoptera
- Suborder: Polyphaga
- Infraorder: Cucujiformia
- Family: Oedemeridae
- Subfamily: Oedemerinae
- Tribe: Asclerini
- Genus: Oxycopis; Arnett, 1951

= Oxycopis =

Genus of beetles

Oxycopis is a genus of false blister beetles in the family Oedemeridae. There are about 17 described species in Oxycopis.

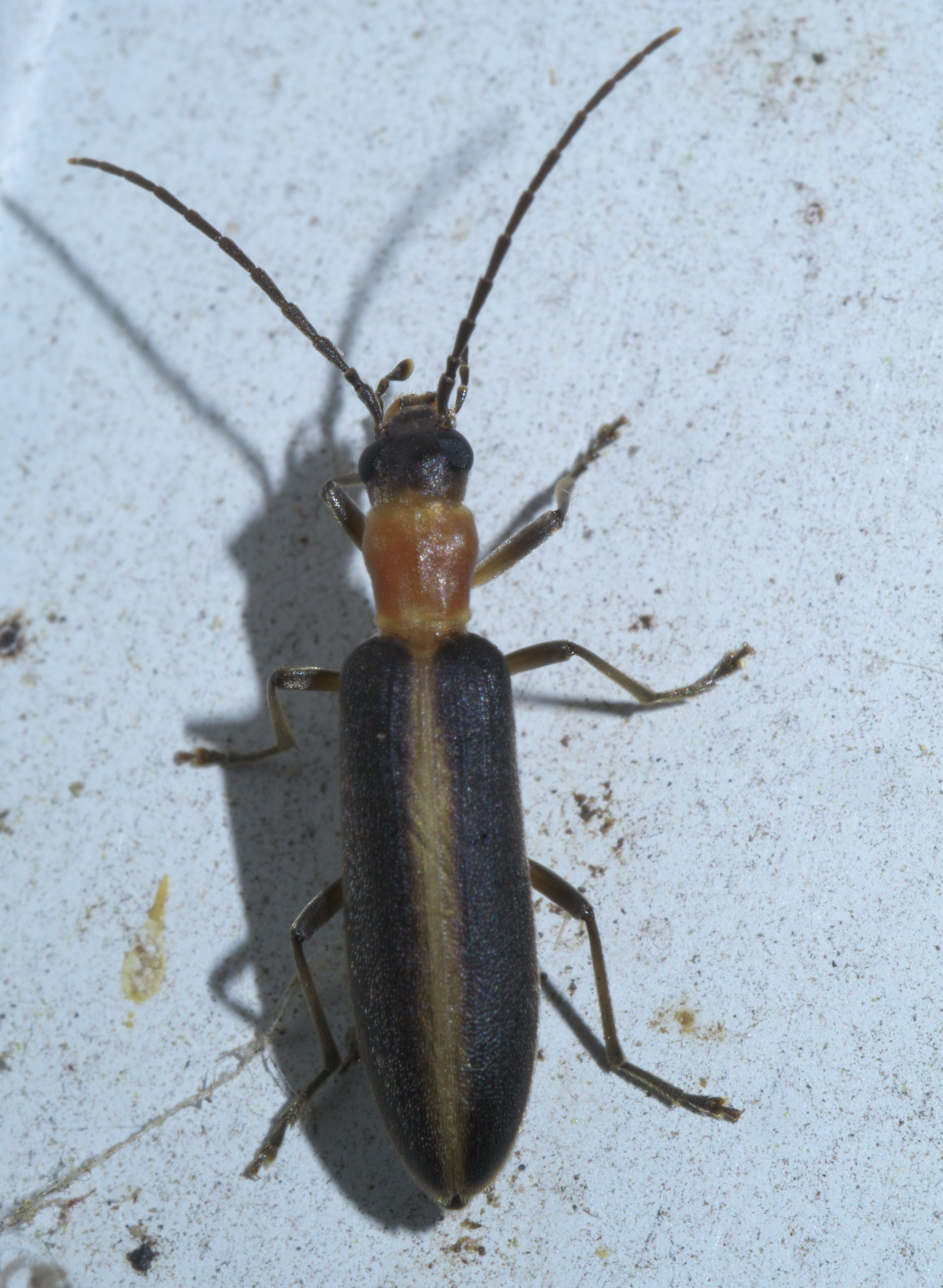
Oxycopis mimetica

== Species ==
These 17 species belong to the genus Oxycopis:

- Oxycopis barberi Arnett
- Oxycopis dietrichi (Arnett, 1951)
- Oxycopis falli (Blatchley, 1928)
- Oxycopis floridana (Horn, 1896)
- Oxycopis fuliginosa (LeConte, 1866)
- Oxycopis geayi Pic, 1935
- Oxycopis howdeni Arnett, 1965
- Oxycopis lemoulti (Pic, 1923)
- Oxycopis mariae (Arnett, 1951)
- Oxycopis mcdonaldi (Arnett, 1951)
- Oxycopis mimetica (Horn, 1896)
- Oxycopis nigripennis (Champion, 1890)
- Oxycopis nigroapicalis (Pic, 1924)
- Oxycopis notoxoides (Fabricius, 1801)
- Oxycopis suturalis (Horn, 1896)
- Oxycopis thoracica (Fabricius, 1801)
- Oxycopis vittata (Fabricius, 1775)
