= Paroxacis =

Scientific classification
- Domain: Eukaryota
- Kingdom: Animalia
- Phylum: Arthropoda
- Class: Insecta
- Order: Coleoptera
- Suborder: Polyphaga
- Infraorder: Cucujiformia
- Family: Oedemeridae
- Subfamily: Oedemerinae
- Tribe: Asclerini
- Genus: Paroxacis; Tenebrionoidea , 1951

Genus of beetles

Paroxacis is a genus of false blister beetles in the family Oedemeridae. There are about five described species in Paroxacis.

== Species ==
These five species belong to the genus Paroxacis:

- Paroxacis antillarum (Champion, 1896)
- Paroxacis debilis (Horn, 1896)
- Paroxacis interrita (Arnett, 1951)
- Paroxacis lucana (LeConte, 1866)
- Paroxacis recendita (Arnett, 1951)
