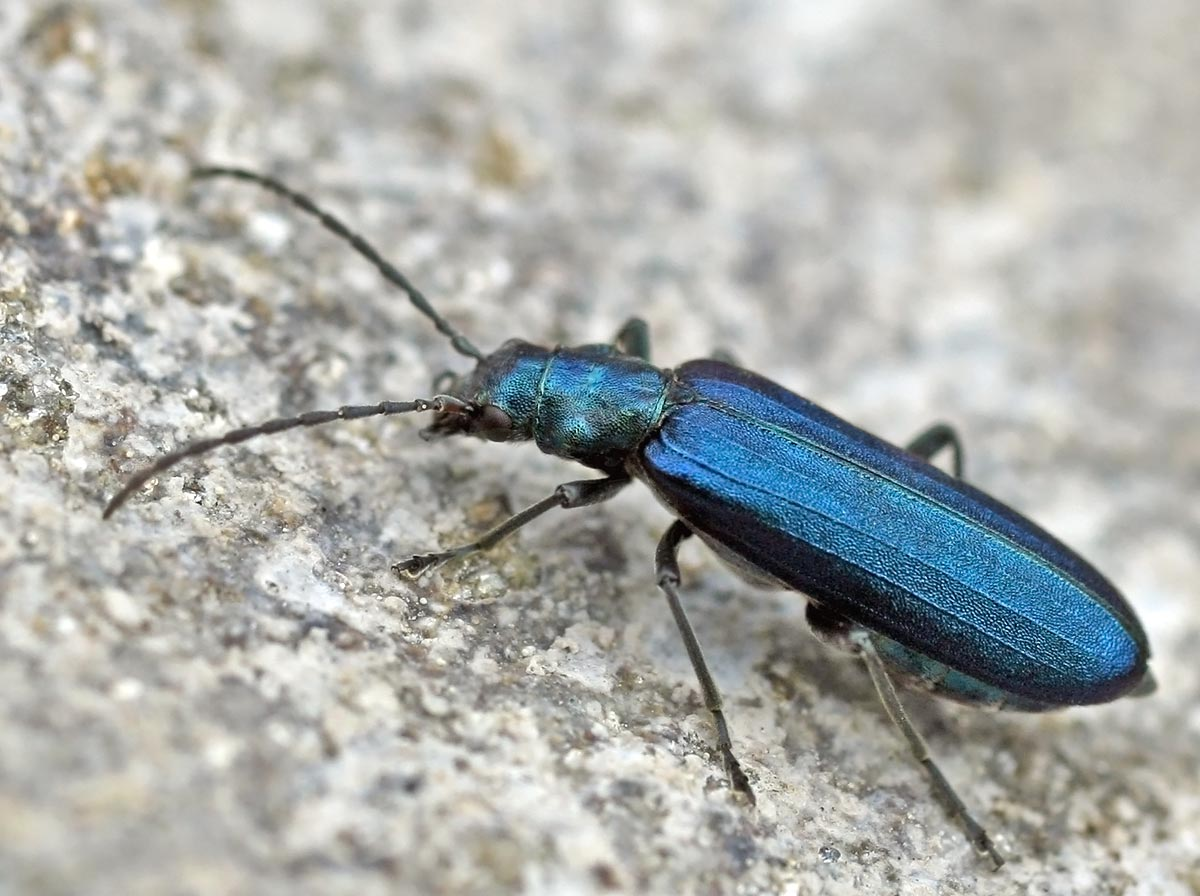
- Ischnomera cyanea

Scientific classification
- Domain: Eukaryota
- Kingdom: Animalia
- Phylum: Arthropoda
- Class: Insecta
- Order: Coleoptera
- Suborder: Polyphaga
- Infraorder: Cucujiformia
- Family: Oedemeridae
- Tribe: Asclerini
- Genus: Ischnomera; Stephens, 1832

Synonyms
- Asclera Dejean, 1834

= Ischnomera =

Genus of beetles

Ischnomera is a genus of false blister beetles in the subfamily Oedemerinae.

== Species ==
Ischnomera contains over 40 species:

- Ischnomera apicipennis Švihla, 1992
- Ischnomera atricolor Pic, 1922
- Ischnomera auripilis Van Dyke, 1946
- Ischnomera bajsunensis Švihla, 2004
- Ischnomera besucheti Švihla, 1993
- Ischnomera cinerascens (Pandellé, 1867)
- Ischnomera cyanea (Fabricius, 1793)
- Ischnomera dalatensis Pic, 1928
- Ischnomera danilevskiji Švihla, 1992
- Ischnomera discolor Leconte, 1874
- Ischnomera dzhungarica Švihla, 1986
- Ischnomera erdemliensis Švihla, 1998
- Ischnomera excavata Leconte, 1852
- Ischnomera fuscipennis Švihla, 1988
- Ischnomera girardi Švihla, 1992
- Ischnomera graeca Dahlgren, 1976
- Ischnomera griseicornis Pic, 1922
- Ischnomera holzschuhi Švihla, 1988
- Ischnomera incostata Pic, 1926
- Ischnomera jezeki Švihla, 1988
- Ischnomera klapperichi Švihla, 1997
- Ischnomera konoi Nakane, 1973
- Ischnomera kopetzi Švihla, 2004
- Ischnomera licenti Pic, 1939
- Ischnomera maceki Švihla, 1988
- Ischnomera malleri (Pic, 1935)
- Ischnomera nigra Leconte, 1852
- Ischnomera obliterate (Pic, 1926)
- Ischnomera okushimai Švihla, 1997
- Ischnomera persica Švihla, 1992
- Ischnomera puncticollis Say, 1823
- Ischnomera ruficollis Say, 1823
- Ischnomera sanguincollis (Fabricius, 1787)
- Ischnomera sicula Bologna, Poloni & Vázquez, 2019
- Ischnomera similis Švihla, 1982
- Ischnomera subrugosa (Kono, 1937)
- Ischnomera sveci Švihla, 2004
- Ischnomera taiwana Švihla, 1992
- Ischnomera tenietensis (Abeille, 1896)
- Ischnomera viator Champion, 1927
- Ischnomera xanthoderes (Mulsant, 1858)
