= Heliocis =

Scientific classification
- Domain: Eukaryota
- Kingdom: Animalia
- Phylum: Arthropoda
- Class: Insecta
- Order: Coleoptera
- Suborder: Polyphaga
- Infraorder: Cucujiformia
- Family: Oedemeridae
- Tribe: Asclerini
- Genus: Heliocis; Arnett, 1951
- Species: H. repanda

Binomial name
- Heliocis repanda (Horn, 1896)

Genus of insects

Heliocis is a genus of false blister beetles in the family Oedemeridae. There is one described species in Heliocis, H. repanda.
