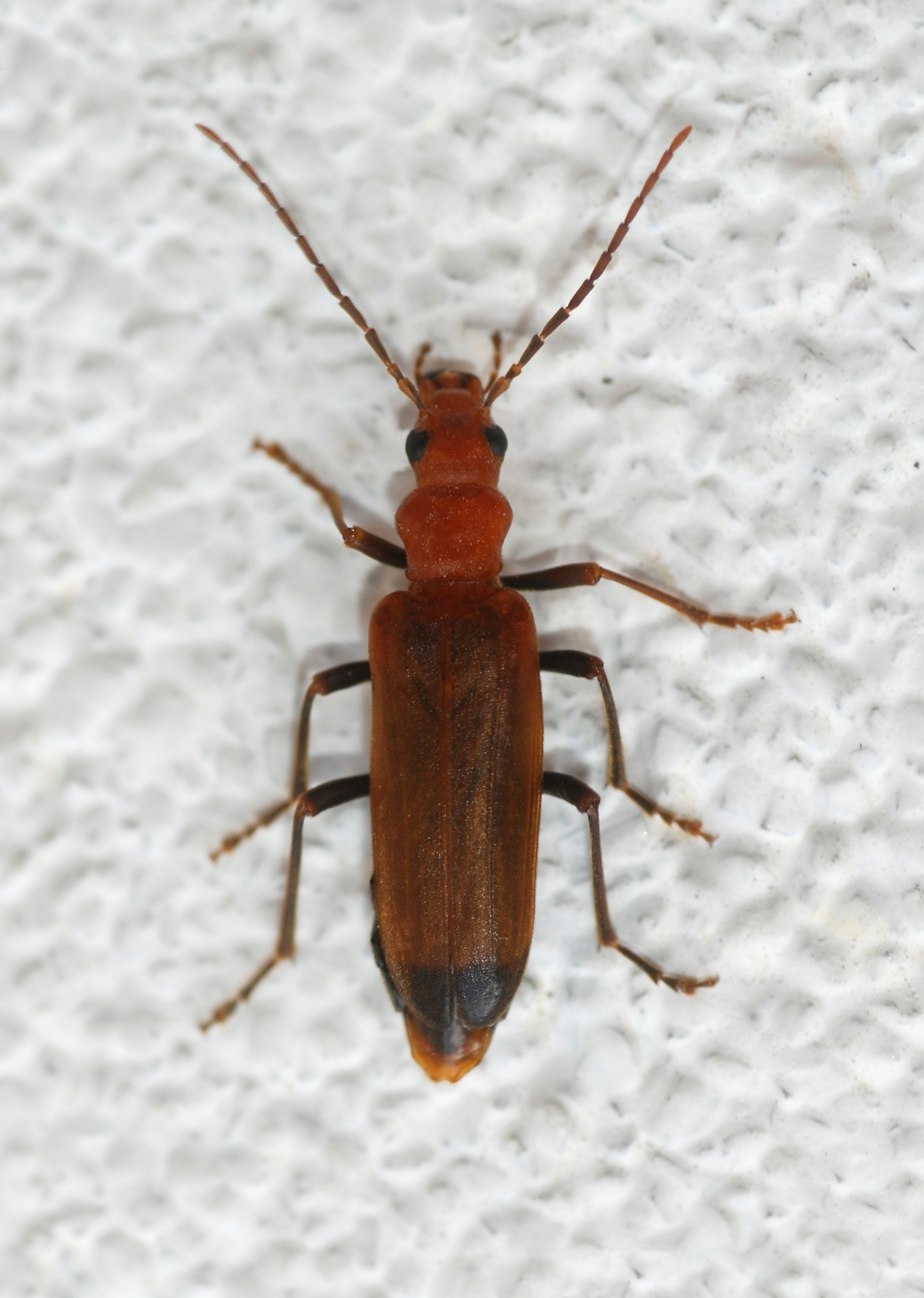

Scientific classification
- Kingdom: Animalia
- Phylum: Arthropoda
- Clade: Pancrustacea
- Class: Insecta
- Order: Coleoptera
- Suborder: Polyphaga
- Infraorder: Cucujiformia
- Family: Oedemeridae
- Genus: Nacerdes
- Species: N. melanura

Binomial name
- Nacerdes melanura (Linnaeus, 1758)

= Wharf borer =

Wharf Borer

Species of beetle

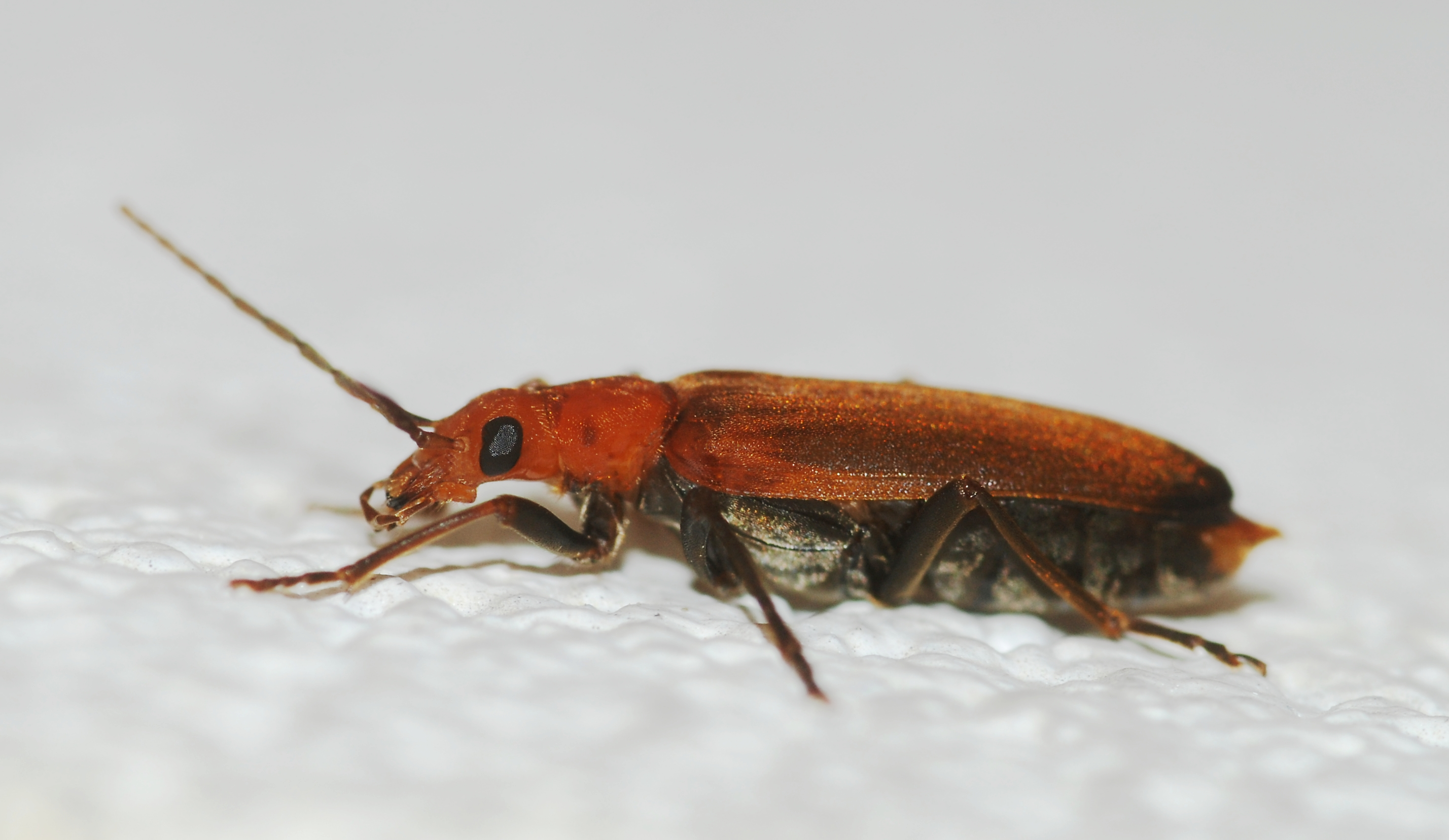
Wharf borer, Nacerdes melanura

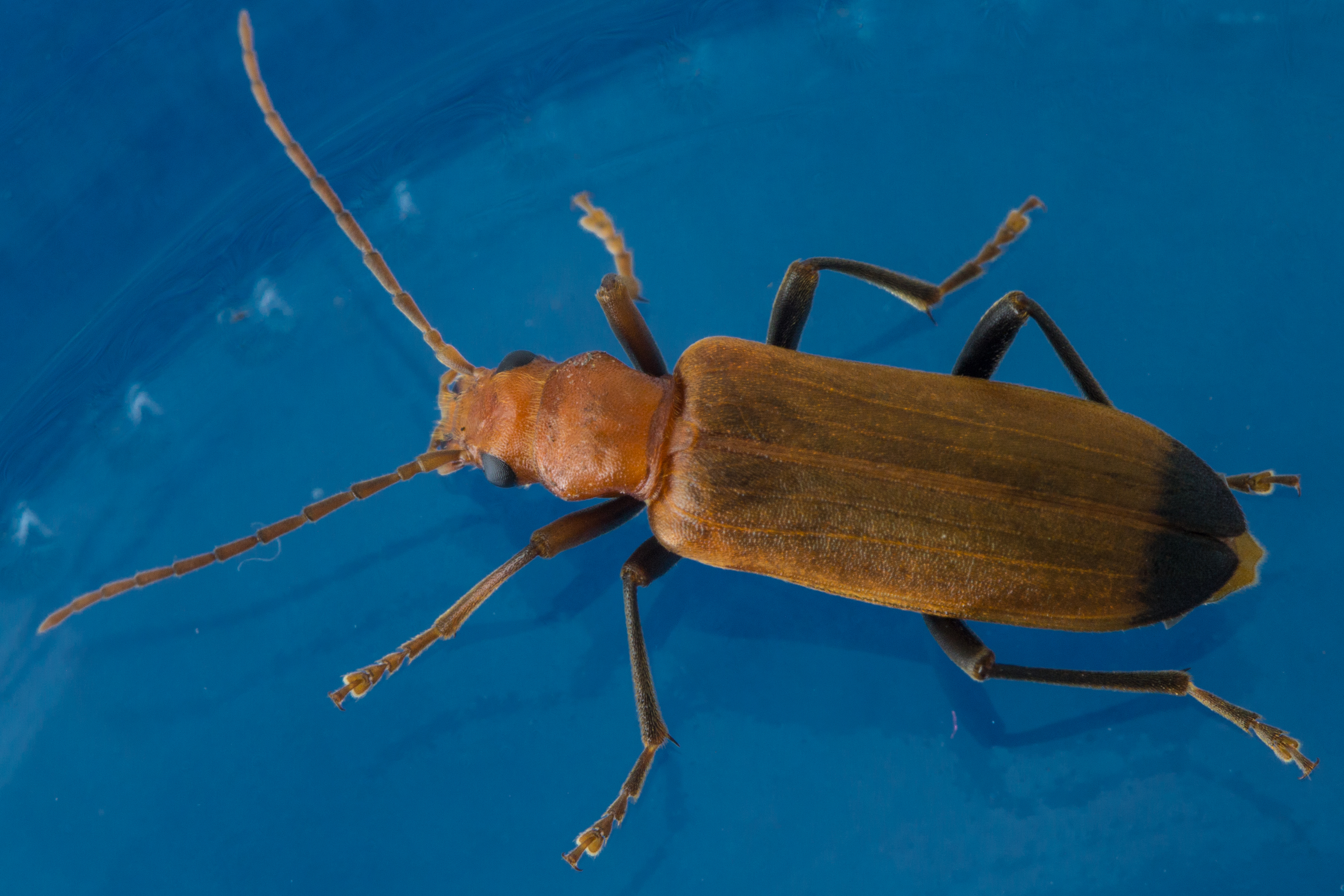
Wharf borer, Nacerdes melanura

The wharf borer, Nacerdes melanura, belongs to the insect order Coleoptera, the beetles. They belong to the family Oedemeridae, known as false blister beetles. Wharf borers are present in all the states of the USA except for Florida. It takes about a year to develop from an egg to an adult. The name 'wharf borer' comes from the larval stage of this insect, which often lingers on pilings and timbers of wharves, especially along coastal areas. The adult beetles are identifiable via a black band across the end of both elytra. In addition, wharf borers are distinct from other members of the family Oedemeridae due to the presence of a single spur on the tibia of the forelegs and the distance between both eyes (twice the length of one eye). The female beetle oviposits eggs on rotten wood, on which the larvae hatch, burrow, then feed. Adults do not eat and depend on stored energy reserves accumulated as a larva. They are considered a pest because they damage wood used in building infrastructures.

== Identification ==
The female of this beetle will lay eggs in any damp, decaying timber which has been attacked by fungus. The eggs are creamy white, slightly curved with tapered ends. The larvae, also creamy white, are equipped with brown mandibles, ready to bore into the timber and feed on the wood. The adult insects are around 10–12 mm in length, yellowish to reddish-orange, with a long slender body and antennae half its body length. Many adult beetles can emerge from under the floor of buildings, causing the occupants to mistake them for cockroaches. They are distinct from cockroaches by the black band across the end of both elytra and the three raised longitudinal lines on each wing case – a trait common to all beetles in the family Oedemeridae. There are seven species of this family in the UK. They resemble Soldier Beetles found on flowers in size and form, and both groups are harmless to humans.

== Natural history ==
=== Distribution and habitat ===
The wharf borer is a cosmopolitan species. They live anywhere there is moist and decaying wood, such as wharf timbers that are regularly submerged by a tidal flow river. The River Thames is one example. A survey by Pitman et al. (2003) revealed the wharf borer to be widespread in temperate countries. There were samples recorded in Australia, New Zealand, Japan, France, Denmark, and Canada. Pitman et al. (2003) further noted that wharf borers are widespread in the UK and Wales, with a few records in Scotland, but neither adults nor larvae were found in Ireland. This beetle is thought to be a native of the Great Lakes region of North America and has been reported to cause much damage to dock timber in this region. However, others believed they were introduced to the New World from Europe by the lumber trade or driftwood. There is still uncertainty in the scientific literature about the origin of the wharf borer.

Wharf borer adults may be present in different habitats but larvae are almost always restricted to damp, rotten wood. Buried pieces of wood may also harbor the insects. It was said that their populations rose in London following the Second World War when masses of timber became buried under the ground following bomb blasts. They were found beneath the floor of gasoline stations, apartments, and even telegraph poles.

=== Life cycle ===
Like all beetles, the wharf borer undergoes complete metamorphosis. The development time from egg to adult is about 12 months, and adults tend to emerge around June to late August in the U.K. Eggs are deposited on wood surfaces where they are subjected to temperature extremes. Egg longevity is reported to be 5–11 days. First instar larvae burrow about 1 cm beneath the surface of the wood after hatching, where soft-rot type degradation is evident. The larval stage is reported to last from up to 2 months to 2 years, during which time larvae digest cellulose and hemicellulose. Larvae produce the enzyme cellulase, which enables them to feed on rooting wood, similar to many wood-boring Coleopterans. Tunnels formed by larvae during burrowing through the wood can be 30 cm long. A certain head capsule size must be attained for larvae to pupate, which takes about 8.5 months to attain. The cream-white Pupae are reported to last 6–17 days, the exact amount of time is influenced by temperature and relative humidity. At the onset of pupation, the abdomen is reduced, and the head loses its prognathous form. After 3 days, the eyes start to be pigmented, followed by the mandibles at six days and the elytra at nine days. Pupae are capable of moving the abdomen from side to side. Adults are short-lived, non-feeding, free-living, able to fly, and can locate wood via olfactory cues. They emerge from the resting pupal stage between May and September, though are more often observed in June. Adults live for about 2–10 days under laboratory conditions, during which time they mate and lay eggs. Females are not substrate specific when choosing an oviposition site. Wharf borers are known to infest both hardwood and softwood.

=== Temperature- and relative humidity-dependent development ===
Temperature influences the development of eggs, and eggs only develop within the range of 20–30 °C. The upper temperature limit for eggs to hatch is around 30–35 °C. This may explain the absence of the wharf borer in tropical climates. Relative humidity also influences egg development, with the lower threshold being 20–40%. Females lay eggs at temperatures that are suitable for egg development. Temperature is the critical factor that influences the development of the larva and the pupa. Relative humidity and photoperiods do not adversely affect development. Winter does not induce the larvae to pupate. Lower temperatures increase the time for the larvae to attain the required head capsule size for pupation by a reduced metabolic rate. Adults emerge from the pupal stage at almost all relative humidities. This indicates that the pupal stage is more resistant to desiccation than eggs because, as eggs do not develop at relative humidities lower than 20%. Pupae are reported not to develop below 10 °C, or above 30 °C. At higher temperatures, adult longevity is reduced by a large margin. This is because insect activity increases, and therefore speeds up usage of stored energy reserves. Lower relative humidity also decreases longevity due to increased desiccation, especially with non-feeding adults and those without an external water supply.

== Human impact ==
The wharf borer's name is of importance to fishermen, sailors, and quarrymen who work in coastal areas. Damage done to old ships and docks by the wharf borer is a good indication of how old the vessels are as the beetles only attack old timber. The presence of wharf borers and the simultaneous destruction can be accepted as a safety precaution to repair docks and ships to avoid dangerous accidents. It is known as a secondary pest because the larva mainly feeds on damp and decaying wood found along waterways and coastlines. The network of tunnels forms when wharf borer larvae burrow and ingest the rotten wood, weakening the mechanical support given by the wood. This leads to increased damage to plumbing and rotting timbers. Oak, poplar, and pine are some of the timbers attacked by the wharf borer, indicating its development in both soft and hardwoods. It is best to correct the wood moisture problems and remove the source of infected decaying wood. The beetles, most often a nuisance between June and August, can be controlled by the application of a residual insecticide (such as permethrin). This can be applied to the wall and floor junctions of dwellings and offices. These adults can also be vacuumed or picked up and discarded. The larvae are a pest of telegraph poles and fences where dogs have urinated. In Toronto, a large number of adults were discovered in a newspaper office, especially attracted to toilets. In America, Drooz (1953) reported that the insect was responsible for very costly damage to foundations underneath buildings in Milwaukee, Wisconsin. To protect stored archaeological timbers from the damaging effects of wharf borers, a procedure has been developed to control the attacks. The first measure calls for checking the particular area for infestation by insects. Next, the extent of infestation in the stored timbers is determined. Once the degree of damage has been recorded, the timbers need to be isolated and quarantined. The storage area and the infected timbers are subjected to an appropriate treatment system that is compatible with future conservation treatment systems.
