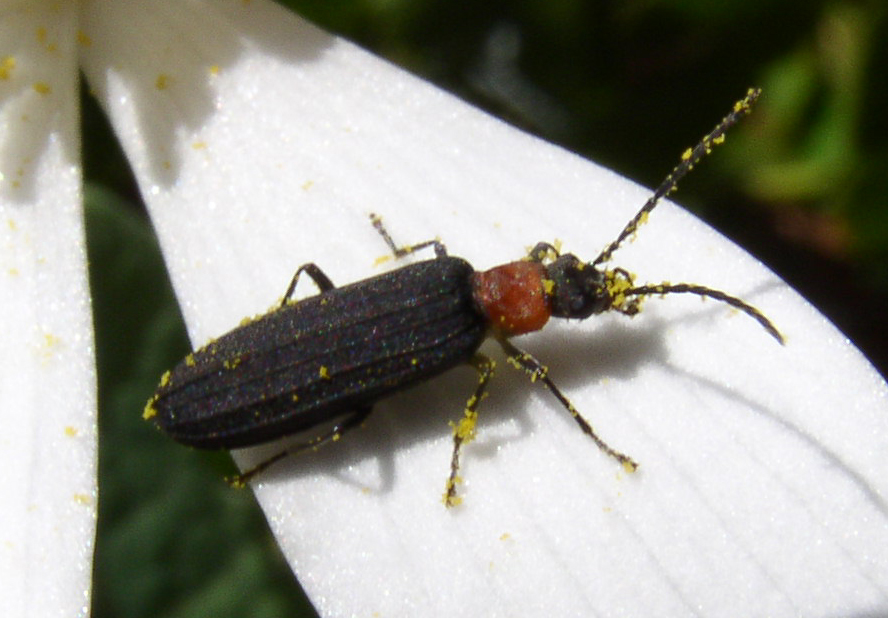
- Ischnomera ruficollis on bloodroot

Scientific classification
- Domain: Eukaryota
- Kingdom: Animalia
- Phylum: Arthropoda
- Class: Insecta
- Order: Coleoptera
- Suborder: Polyphaga
- Infraorder: Cucujiformia
- Family: Oedemeridae
- Subfamily: Oedemerinae
- Tribe: Asclerini; Semenov, 1894

= Asclerini =

Tribe of beetles

Asclerini is a tribe of false blister beetles in the family Oedemeridae. There are more than 40 genera and over 200 described species in Asclerini.

== Genera ==
These 42 genera belong to the tribe Asclerini:

- Afrochitona
- Alloxantha Seidlitz, 1899
- Anacerdochroa Svihla, 1986
- Ananca Fairmaire & Germain, 1863
- Apterosessinia Blair, 1926
- Asclerosibutia Pic, 1914
- Baculipalpus Broun, 1880
- Chitona W.Schmidt, 1844
- Colobostomoides Svihla, 1983
- Copidita LeConte, 1866
- Diplectrus Kirsch, 1866
- Ditylomorphula Svihla, 1986
- Ditylomorphus Svihla, 1986
- Dohrnia Malm, 1874
- Eobia Semenov, 1894
- Eumecomera Arnett, 1951
- Heliocis Arnett, 1951
- Hypasclera Kirsch, 1866
- Indasclera Svihla, 1980
- Ischnomera Stephens, 1832
- Koniaphassa Hudson, 1975
- Mecopselaphus Solier, 1849
- Melananthia Blair, 1926
- Melananthoides Vazquez, 1996
- Microsessinia Pic, 1922
- Nacatrorus Vazquez, 1996
- Nacerdochroa Reitter, 1893
- Oxacis LeConte, 1866
- Oxycopis Arnett, 1951
- Parisopalpus Hudson, 1975
- Paroxacis Arnett, 1951
- Platylytra Fairmaire & Germain, 1863
- Probosca W.Schmidt, 1846
- Pseudohyperasclera
- Pseudolycus Guérin, 1833
- Rhinoplatia Horn, 1868
- Selenopalpus White, 1846
- Sessinia Pascoe, 1863
- Sisenes Champion, 1889
- Thelyphassa Pascoe, 1876
- Vasaces Champion, 1889
- Xanthochroina Ganglbauer, 1881
