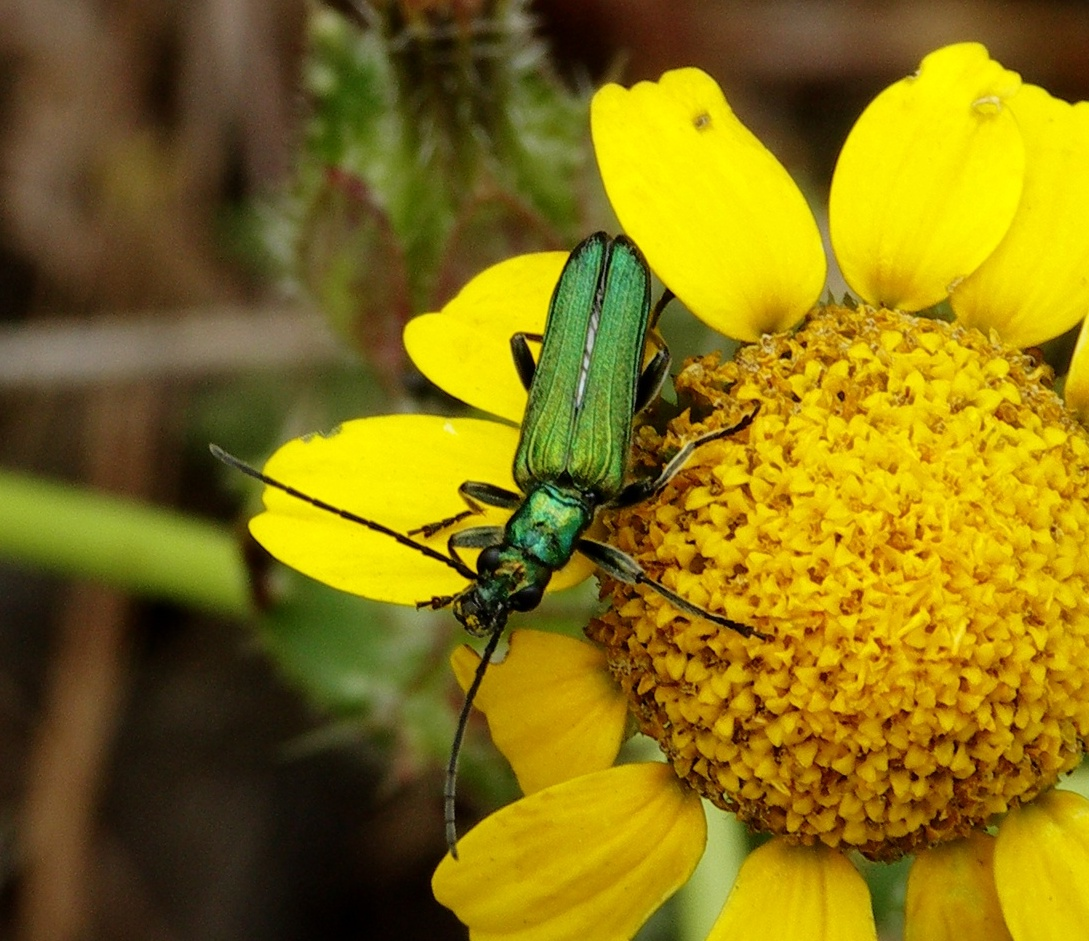
- Anogcodes seladonius on Anthemis tinctoria

Scientific classification
- Kingdom: Animalia
- Phylum: Arthropoda
- Class: Insecta
- Order: Coleoptera
- Suborder: Polyphaga
- Infraorder: Cucujiformia
- Superfamily: Tenebrionoidea
- Family: Oedemeridae; Latreille, 1810

Subfamilies
- Nacerdinae; Calopodinae; Oedemerinae

= Oedemeridae =

Oedemeridae Temporal range: Albian–Recent

Family of beetles

The family Oedemeridae is a cosmopolitan group of beetles commonly known as false blister beetles, though some recent authors have coined the name pollen-feeding beetles. There are some 100 genera and 1,500 species in the family, mostly associated with rotting wood as larvae, though adults are quite common on flowers. The family was erected by Pierre André Latreille in 1810.

== Characteristics ==
Oedemeridae may be defined as slender, soft-bodied beetles of medium size found mostly on flowers and foliage. The head lacks a narrow neck, the antennae are long and filiform, the pronotum lacks lateral edges and is much narrower than elytra, the tarsi are heteromerous with bilobed penultimate segment, the procoxal cavities are open behind and the procoxae are conical and contiguous.

== Natural history ==
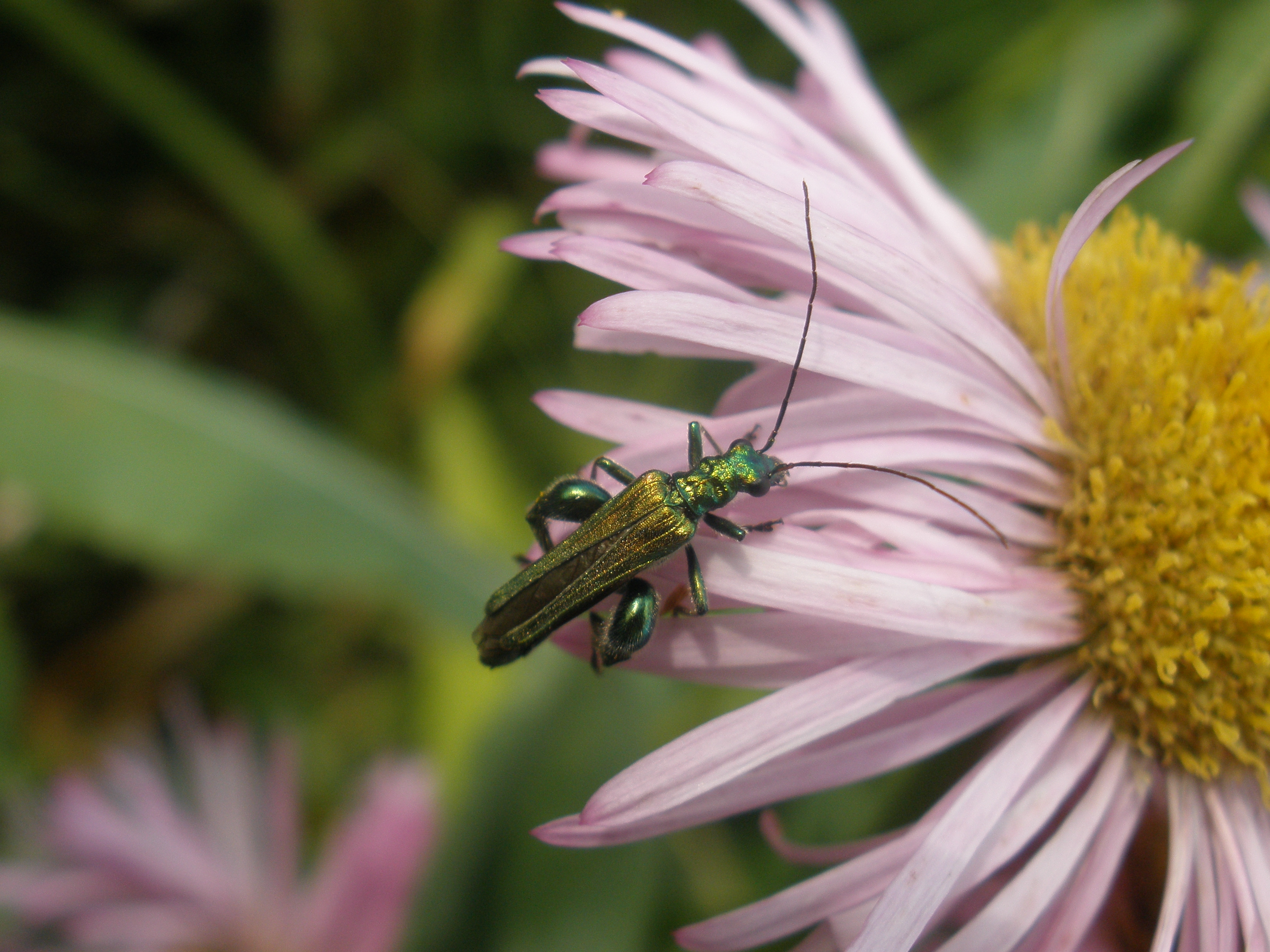
Oedemera nobilis

The larvae of most genera are xylophagous, boring tunnels in spongy, damp wood in an advanced state of decomposition; thus they have little economic importance, with the exception of one species, the "wharf borer" (Nacerdes melanura), that is ever known to attain pest status, as its larvae bore into wet wood in coastal areas; larvae can also bore into wood located in the tidal zone so at times are submerged by seawater, and can damage docks, wharves, and pilings. Larvae of the genera Oedemera and Stenostoma develop in dead stems of herbaceous plants.

Adults contain the toxic cantharidin in their corporal fluids as a defensive mechanism; several species show brilliant and metallic blue, green, gold or coppery, often combined with yellow, orange or red, aposematic colourations. In temperate regions, adults are mainly polyphagous pollen and nectar-feeding, and diurnal in activity. In tropical areas, most are nocturnal and are attracted to light.

== Evolutionary history ==
The oldest known member of the family is Darwinylus from the Early Cretaceous (Albian) aged Alava amber from the Escucha Formation, Spain, a basal member of the subfamily Oedemerinae. Unlike living species of the family, the specimen was found with gymnosperm (suspected to be cycad) pollen on its body, suggesting that the family had a gymnosperm associated prior to switching to flowering plants. Species of the extinct genus Ditysparedrus and extant genus Sparedrus belonging to the subfamily Calopodinae, are known from the Late Cretaceous (Cenomanian) aged Burmese amber of Myanmar.

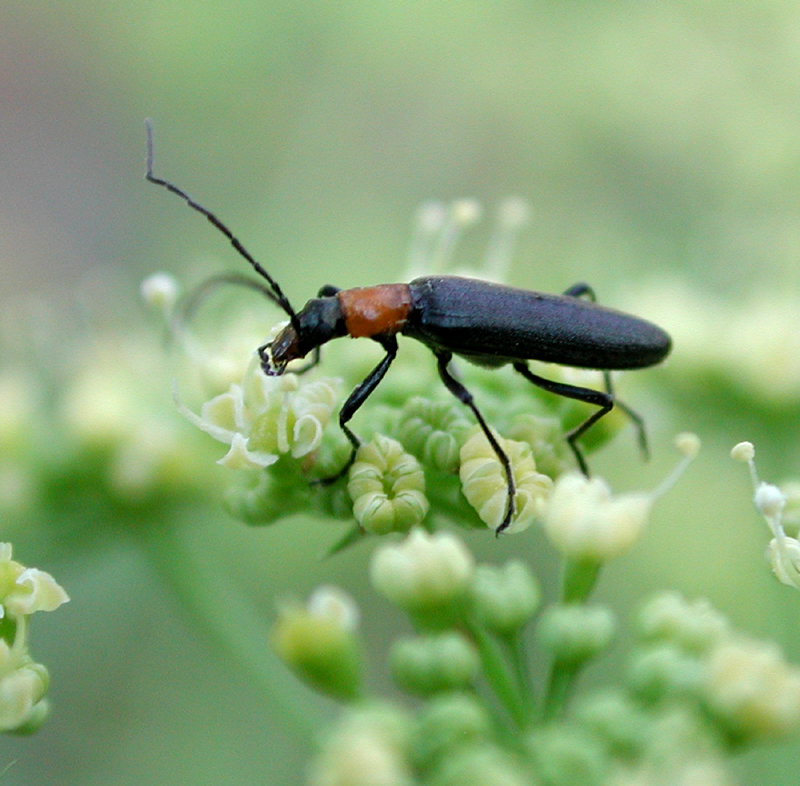
Oedemerid on parsley

== See also ==
- Blister beetle dermatitis
- List of Oedemeridae genera
