= Maria Buchinger =

German therapeutic fasting advocate

Maria Buchinger (* 21 May 1916 in Flensburg, Germany; † 12 March 2010 in Marbella, Spain) was a German proponent of therapeutic fasting. Buchinger was a personal assistant to her father, Otto Buchinger, a doctor who researched therapeutic fasting. Together with her husband, Helmut Wilhelmi, Buchinger opened fasting clinics in Überlingen, Germany and Marbella, Spain.

== Early life ==
Maria Buchinger was the daughter of Otto Buchinger, a doctor in the Imperial German Navy and the founder of therapeutic fasting.

== Career ==
In 1938, Maria became her father's assistant at his clinic in West Germany and eventually took over the business after her father passed.

With her husband she opened Buchinger Wilhelmi clinic in Überlingen on Lake Constance in 1953. In 1973 they opened a second clinic in Marbella, Spain, where Maria lived.

== Personal life ==
She married Helmut Wilhelmi in 1943. They had three children, all of whom were active in the family business. Her son Raimund Wilhelmi and his wife Francoise Wihlemi de Toledo managed the clinic in Überlingen. Maria's five grandchildren also became involved in the clinics. In February 2019, Leonard Wilhelmi, Maria's grandson, became manager of the Buchinger Wilhelmi clinic in Überlingen.

Maria spent her remaining years in Marbella, where she died peacefully on 12 March 2010.

== Honours ==
- 2003: Entrepreneur of the Year by Marbella’s trade association
- 2008: Tribute from the local Rotary Club
