= Françoise Wilhelmi de Toledo =

Swiss physician and fasting expert (1953–2026)

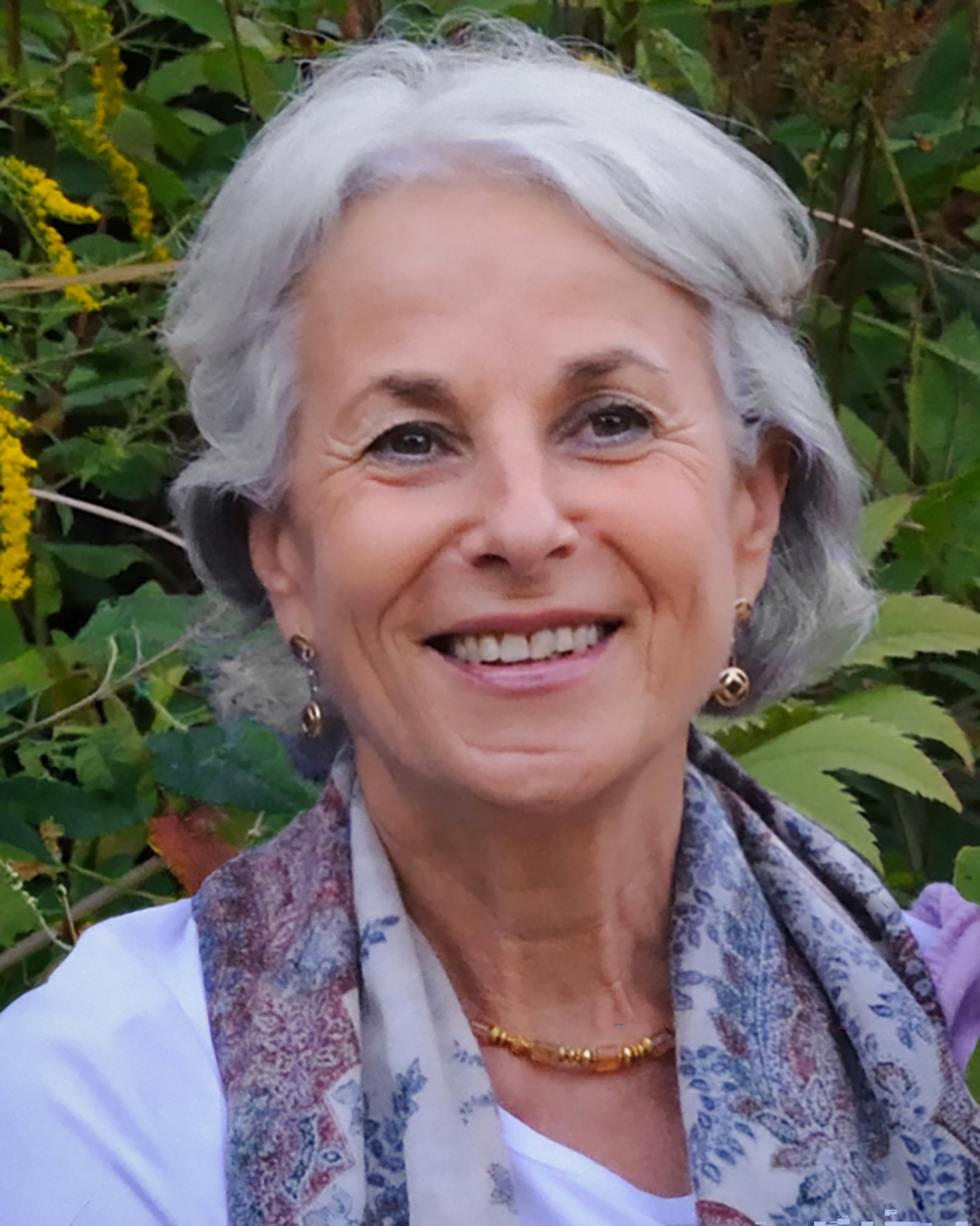
- Born: 5 February 1953; Geneva, Switzerland
- Died: 1 May 2026 (aged 73); Zurich, Switzerland
- Known for: Therapeutic fasting
- Scientific career
- Fields: Medicine

Françoise Wilhelmi de Toledo (5 February 1953 – 1 May 2026) was a Swiss physician and researcher known for her work on therapeutic fasting.

Wilhelmi de Toledo was a co-founder of the Medical Association for Fasting and Nutrition (Ärztegesellschaft für Heilfasten und Ernährung, ÄGHE) and served as managing director of the family-owned company Buchinger Wilhelmi, founded by Otto Buchinger.

== Early life and education ==
Wilhelmi de Toledo was born in Geneva, Switzerland on 5 February 1953. She studied medicine in Geneva, graduating in 1982. She continued her postgraduate training in Switzerland and obtained her doctoral degree in Basel. Her dissertation was titled Methodical Problems in Assessing the Vitamin Balance in Fasting.

In 2012, she completed an Executive Master of Business Administration (EMBA) in Family Entrepreneurship at Zeppelin University in Friedrichshafen, Germany.

== Career ==
Wilhelmi de Toledo reported having practiced fasting since adolescence and later focused her professional work on therapeutic fasting and its role within integrative medicine.

In 1982, she married Raimund Wilhelmi, grandson of Otto Buchinger. She subsequently became involved in the management of Buchinger Wilhelmi, which operates fasting clinics in Überlingen, Germany (established in 1953), and Marbella, Spain (established in 1973).

As scientific director of Buchinger Wilhelmi, she oversaw the development of medical programmes and documentation related to fasting therapies. In 1986, she co-founded the Medical Association for Fasting and Nutrition (ÄGHE), which publishes guidelines on therapeutic fasting.

In 2011, she founded the Maria Buchinger Foundation, which supports research into therapeutic fasting, and served as its chair.

She was president of the Soroptimist International club in Überlingen from 2016 to 2018.

== Death ==
Wilhelmi de Toledo died in Zurich on 1 May 2026, at the age of 73.

== Publications ==
- El ayuno terapéutico Buchinger: Una experiencia para el cuerpo y el espíritu. 2003, ISBN 978-8425423390
- Lebensreform Gestern – zukunftsfähige Lebensweise heute und morgen. In: 40 Jahre Eden Stiftung – Zur Förderung naturnaher Lebenshaltung und Gesundheitspflege. Bad Soden, 2004, pp. 46–53.
- Leitfaden Ernährungsmedizin. Heilfasten. 2005, ISBN 978-3-437-56530-4
- Fastentherapie. In: Lehrbuch Naturheilverfahren. 2009, ISBN 3830453337
- Médecines et alimentation du futur. La médecine intégrative et le jeûne thérapeutique. 2009, ISBN 978-3-437-56530-4
- Ernährung und Fasten als Therapie. 2010, ISBN 3540888098
- Buchinger Heilfasten: Die Original-Methode. 2010, ISBN 9783830435396
- English edition: Therapeutic Fasting: The Buchinger Amplius Method. 2011, ISBN 3131603615
- L’art de jeûner: manuel du jeûne thérapeutique. 2015, ISBN 978-2-88911-483-2
