= Andelshofer Weiher =

Artificial reservoir in Germany

- Neuweiher
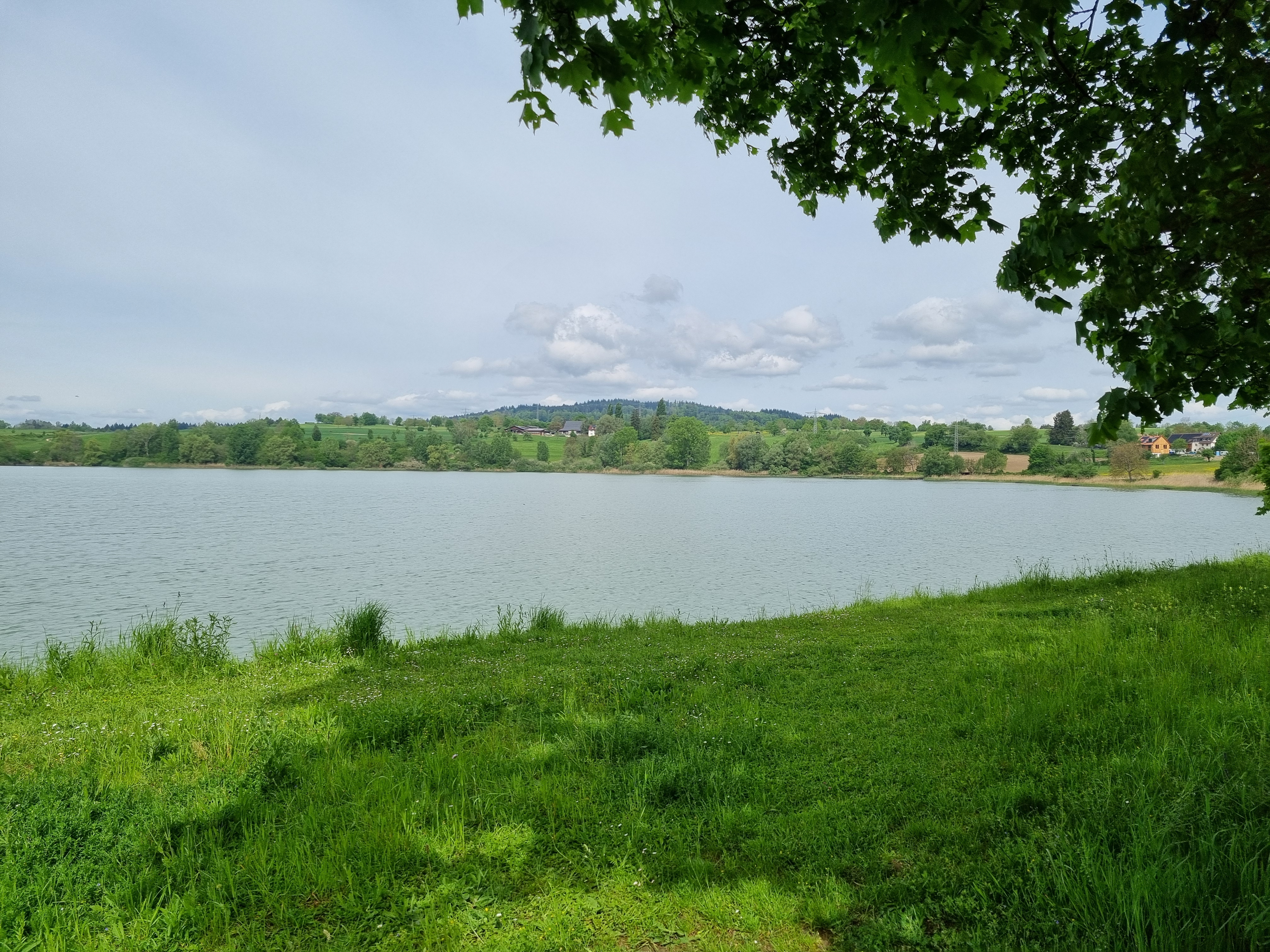
- Andelshofer Weiher
- Interactive map of Andelshofer Weiher
- Location: Überlingen, Germany
- Coordinates: 47°47′11.6″N 9°10′39.8″E
- Primary inflows: Auenbach (Owingen)
- Basin countries: Germany
- Surface area: 32.3 hectares (80 acres)
- Average depth: 3.4 metres (11 ft)
- Max. depth: 5.3 metres (17 ft)
- Water volume: 1,093,000 cubic metres (1,430,000 cu yd)
- Surface elevation: 505 metres (1,657 ft)

Andelshofer Weiher, also called Neuweiher, is an artificial reservoir in the municipality of Überlingen, Germany. The lake is the second-largest lake in the Bodenseekreis (not counting Lake Constance). Its name comes from the nearby village of Andelshofen.

== Geography ==
The lake is located about 2.5 kilometres (1.6 mi) north of the city center of Überlingen and just northwest of Andelshofen, at an elevation of 505 metres (1,657 ft) above sea level. It is within the natural region of Linzgau. It is currently owned by Überlingen Municipal Utilities (Stadtwerke Überlingen), and is leased by the Überlingen Sport Angler's Association (SAV Überlingen). The lake is primarily used for electricity generation, as stated in the lease agreement, but is also used frequently for fishing.

== Hydrology ==
The lake was created between 1920 and 1930. Maps from the late 1800s show the lake having a smaller surface area than it does now. The lake has a current surface area of 32.3 hectares (80 acres), and an average depth of 3.4 metres (11 ft). The lake's deepest point is located at a depth of 5.3 metres (17 ft), located at the lake's southern end near the dam, which is 6.5 metres (21 ft) tall. The water volume is 1,093,000 cubic metres (1,430,000 cu yd). A 7 ha (17 acres) large island is located in the southwestern portion of the lake. The lake is fed by several creeks, as well as a 2.1 km (1.3 mi) underground canal of the Owinger Auenbach. The lake drains into the Überlingen Arm of Lake Constance, and by extension, the Rhine.

== Ecology ==
Since 1989, the catchment areas in Überlingen and Owingen have taken part in the Action Program for the Restoration of Upper Swabian Lakes (Aktionsprogramm zur Sanierung oberschwäbischer Seen). An important goal of this program is to reduce nutrient dumps into streams, lakes, and ponds, thereby improving water quality and preserving the bodies of water. The majority of the lake's catchment area is used for forestry and agriculture, of which 60% is grassland and 40% is arable land.

Plant nutrients and other trophic indicators

Year	1997*	1998*	2004	2010**	2015	2020
Total PO_{4}-phosphorus (μg/L)	42	50	53	46	40	45
Chlorophyll a (μg/L)	10	15	16	25		
Chlorophyll a peak (μg/L)	28	35	30	44		
Inorganic total nitrogen (mg/L)	0.54	0.49	0.23	0.28		
Secchi depth (m)	2.8	2.0	2.0	1.5		
Trophic state (ACTUAL/TARGET)						e2/m

* surface water only

** in this year, the water level was lowered by one meter due to dam repairs

=== Aquatic Plant Species ===
The lake is home to many aquatic plant species such as:

- European white water lily (Nymphea alba)
- Shining pondweed (Potamogeton lucens)
- Crisp-leaved pondweed (Potamogeton crispus)
- Sago pondweed (Potamogeton pectinatus)
- Small pondweed (Potamogeton berchtoldii)
- Brittle naiad (Najas minor)
- Mockernut hickory (Chara tomentosa)
- Longroot smartweed (Polygonum amphibium)
- Mare's-tail (Hippuris vulgaris)
- Ranunculus circinatus

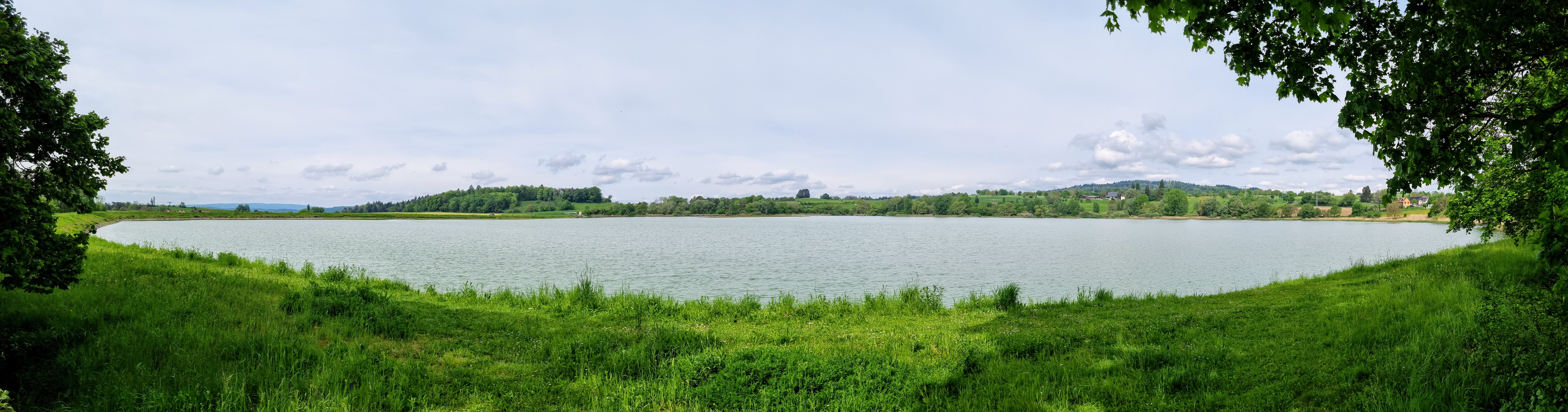
Andelshofer Weiher as seen from the East
