= Karl Joseph Brodtmann =

Swiss artist

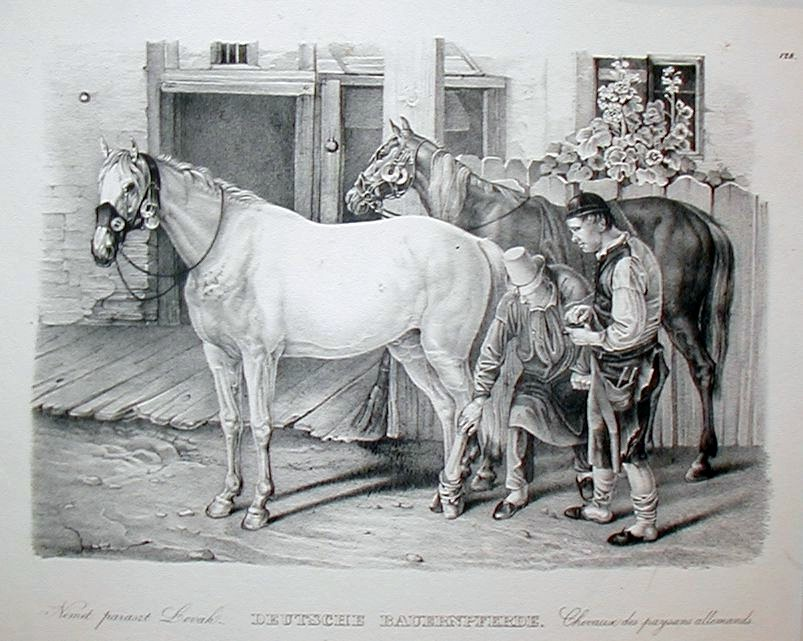
German draught horses by Brodtmann

Karl Joseph/Ioseph Brodtmann (3 February 1787 – 14 May 1862) was a Swiss artist and lithographer, as well as a printmaker, publisher and bookseller. He worked in Zürich and Schaffhausen.

Brodtmann's natural history lithographs include Heinrich Rudolf Schinz's works on reptiles and birds, published in the early 1830s. Brodtmann also produced natural history lithographs, as Naturhistorische Bilder Gallerie aus dem Thierreiche.

Brodtmann was born in Überlingen. He produced his lithographs in the post-Linnaean "'Age of Enlightenment". Natural history specimens were depicted in hand-coloured sets for the use of biologists and the aristocracy, the latter being not only great patrons of the arts and sciences, but including many who were actively interested in fauna and flora. The artists respected scientific accuracy and often displayed a remarkable sense of aesthetics. Brodtmann died, aged 75, in Basel.

== Selected publications ==
- Schinz, H.R., Brodtmann K.I: Naturgeschichte und Abbildungen der Vögel. Brodtmann's lithographische Kunstanstalt, Leipzig 1819–30, 2 vols.
- Naturhistorische Bilder Gallerie aus dem Thierreiche, circa 1824.
- Naturschichte und Abbildungen der Fische, Schaffhausen, 1836, doi:10.3931/e-rara-85906 (vol. 1), doi:10.3931/e-rara-85907 (vol. 2) (Digitized edition at e-rara.), Karl Joseph Brodtmann lithographed the plates.
- Naturgeschichte und Abbildungen der Reptilien, Schaffhausen, 1833–1835, doi:10.3931/e-rara-79384 (vol. 1), doi:10.3931/e-rara-79847 (vol. 2) (Digitized edition at e-rara), Karl Joseph Brodtmann lithographed the plates.
