= Andelshofen =

Village in Überlingen

Coordinates: 47°46′47″N 9°11′14″E

- Village
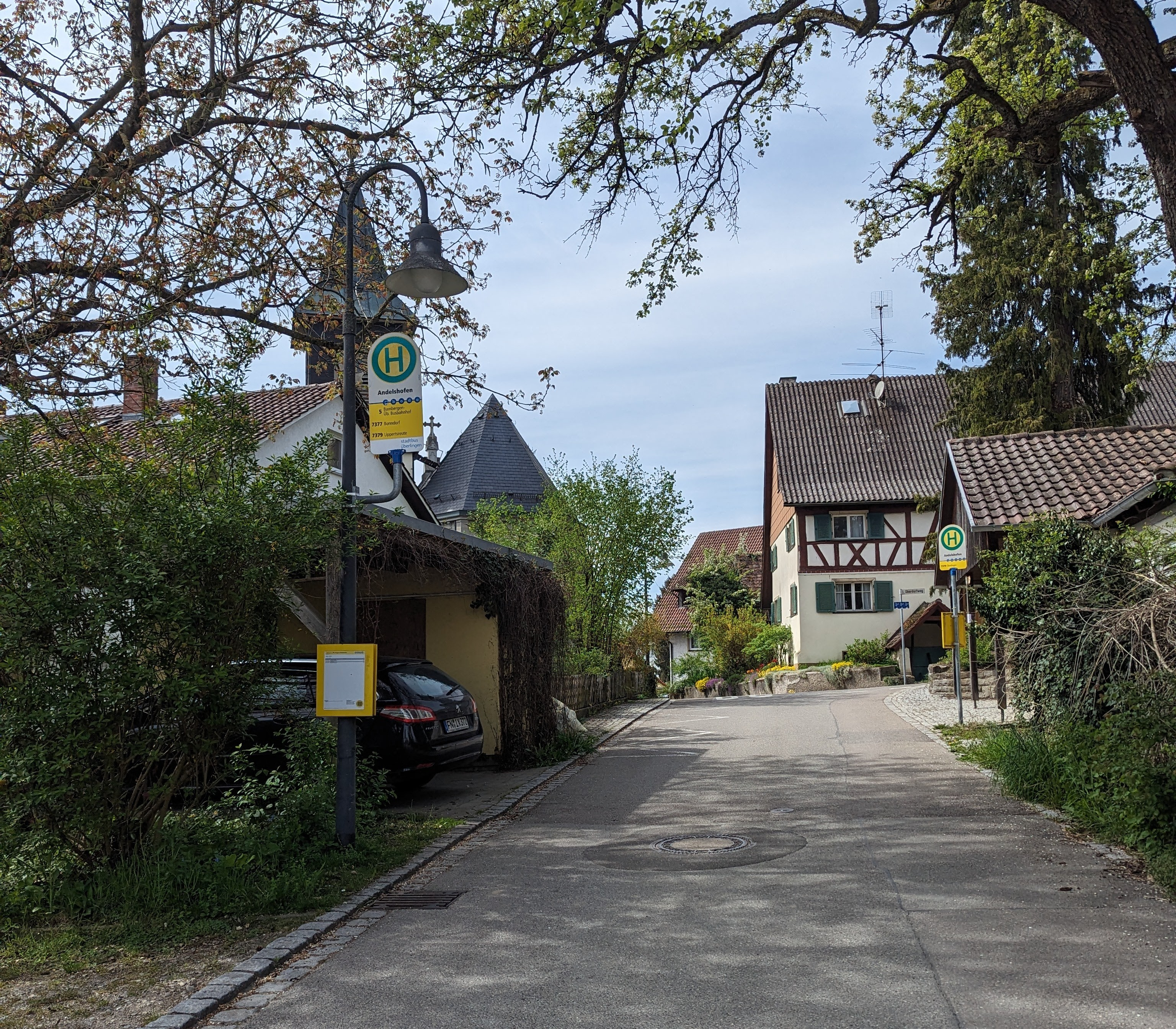
- Andelshofen in 2024
- Interactive map of Andelshofen
- Country: Germany
- State: Baden-Württemberg
- Region: Tübingen
- District: Bodenseekreis
- Municipality: Überlingen

Population (2015)
  - Total: 106
- Postal code: 88662
- Vehicle registration: FN (TT / ÜB optional)

Andelshofen is a village in the municipality of Überlingen, in the west of the Bodenseekreis in southwest Baden-Württemberg, Germany. It is located about 2.5 km (1.6 miles) northwest of Überlingen, just southeast of the Andelshofer Weiher, and has a population of 106.

== History ==
Andelshofen was first mentioned 1239, and historically referred to as Andelsowe. The town was partially owned by the Überlingen Knights Hospitaller (German: Johanniterorden) from the 13th century until 1803. The village burned down in 1552 and 1634, and was rebuilt each time. The lower jurisdiction belonged to the commandery, whereas the higher jurisdiction belonged to the Grafschaft Heiligenberg, and from 1776 onwards, to the Free Imperial City of Überlingen. Andelshofen became a part of the Grand Duchy of Baden in 1805, and was an independent municipality within Überlingen until 1927, when the Baden state parliament decided on a merger of Andelshofen and Überlingen. The areas of Hagenweiler and Schönbuch, which had formerly belonged to Andelshofen, went to the municipalities of Lippertsreute and Bambergen in 1928.

In 1882, the old Andelshofen church was demolished. Construction on the new church began on 22 July 1883. The new neo-gothic church of St. Verena was consecrated on 8 February 1885. In 1934, the church and tower were renovated and a sacristy was added. In the summer of 1968, the church was renovated again.

In March 2026, a historic barn near the Johanniter-Kreuz hotel burned down, causing 300,000 Euros worth of damage to the Johanniter-Kreuz hotel.
