= Alexa Kriele =

German writer

- Born: 1961 (age 64–65)
- Occupation: Author
- Website: Personal website (in German)

Alexa Kriele (born 1961) is a German writer and medium. She describes herself as an "angel interpreter", because, according to her own statements, she can interpret between people and angels.

== Career ==
Alexa Kriele was born in 1961, in Überlingen. She comes from a family of doctors. Kriele studied philosophy and psychology. She worked as a journalist at first. Since 1994, her work has focused on "interpreting angels". She is married to Martin Kriele, a German constitutional law teacher. She lives and works with her family near Berlin. Kriele writes books, produces DVDs and CDs. She has also appeared on television.

== Selected works ==
=== Videos ===
- "Alexa Kriele – Fernsehenauftritte 2000–2004" (Video, 5:56 Minuten). YouTube. 2012-06-14.
- Alexa Kriele (2013-05-21). "Bienensterben – was ist der Grund" (Video, 6:04 Minuten). YouTube.
- Alexa Kriele (2013-03-29). "Was 2013 wirklich zählt – Teil 9 – Ein lichtes Jahrhundert" (Video, 6:44 Minuten). YouTube.
- Alexa Kriele (2013-03-18). "Was 2013 wirklich zählt – Teil 8 – Denken lohnt sich" (Video, 6:54 Minuten). YouTube.
- Michael Friedrich Vogt (2016-12-06). "Dolmetscherin der Engel – Alexa Kriele: Gibt es auch böse Engel?" (Video, 1:45 Stunde). YouTube. Interview

=== Books ===
- Wie im Himmel so auf Erden. 4 Bände. Falk, Seeon 1998–2001; Ullstein, Berlin 2007, ISBN 978-3-548-74387-5
- Die Engel geben Antwort auf Fragen nach dem Sinn des Lebens. Hugendubel, Kreuzlingen 2002; Goldmann, München 2012, ISBN 978-3-442-22023-6
- Mit den Engeln das Leben meistern. Hugendubel, München 2003
- Mit den Engeln über die Schwelle zum Jenseits. Hugendubel, München 2004; Ullstein, Berlin 2009, ISBN 978-3-548-74333-2
- Von Naturgeistern lernen. Hugendubel, München 2005; Ullstein, Berlin 2008, ISBN 978-3-548-74334-9
- Beten mit den Engeln. Hugendubel, München 2006; Ullstein, Berlin 2008, ISBN 978-3-548-74393-6
- Engel weisen Wege zur Heilung. Knaur, München 2007; neu als: Sprich mit deinem Körper, ebd. 2010, ISBN 978-3-426-87373-1
- Wie Wünsche wirklich wahr werden. Franziskus, Stockheim 2010, ISBN 978-3-86213-142-6
- Es werde Licht. Goldmann, München 2014, ISBN 978-3-442-22081-6
