= Heinrich Rudolf Schinz =

Swiss naturalist (1777–1861)

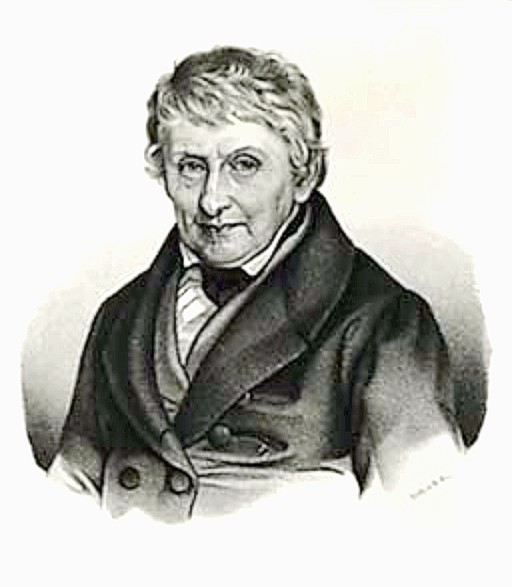
- Born: 30 March 1777; Zürich, Switzerland
- Died: 8 March 1861 (aged 83); Zürich, Switzerland
- Education: University of Würzburg and University of Jena
- Scientific career
- Fields: Zoology
- Workplaces: University of Zurich

Heinrich Rudolf Schinz (30 March 1777 – 8 March 1861) was a Swiss medical doctor and naturalist.

== Biography ==
Schinz was born in Zürich and studied medicine at the universities of Würzburg and Jena. In 1798 he received his doctorate and subsequently returned to his hometown of Zürich as a medical practitioner. In 1804 he became a teacher of physiology and natural history at the medical-surgical institute in Zürich, and from 1833 to 1855 he served as an associate professor of zoology at the university of Zurich.

== Works ==
He was also curator at the natural history society of Zurich, and was the author of many important zoological works; such as:

- Das Thierreich eingetheilt nach dem Bau der Thiere als Grundlage (1821–25), translation of Georges Cuvier's Le Règne animal, with numerous additions.
- Naturschichte und Abbildungen der Fische, Schaffhausen, 1836, doi:10.3931/e-rara-85906 (vol. 1), doi:10.3931/e-rara-85907 (vol. 2) (Digitized edition at e-rara.), Karl Joseph Brodtmann lithographed the plates.
- Naturgeschichte und Abbildungen der Reptilien, Schaffhausen, 1833–1835, doi:10.3931/e-rara-79384 (vol. 1), doi:10.3931/e-rara-79847 (vol. 2) (Digitized edition at e-rara), Karl Joseph Brodtmann lithographed the plates.
- Europäsche Fauna (1840).

== Gallery ==
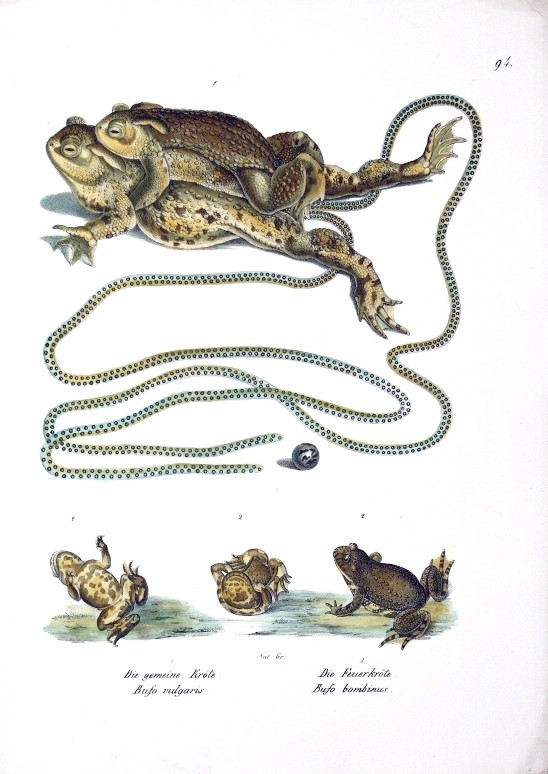
Bufo spp. from "Naturgeschichte und Abbildungen Der Reptilien"

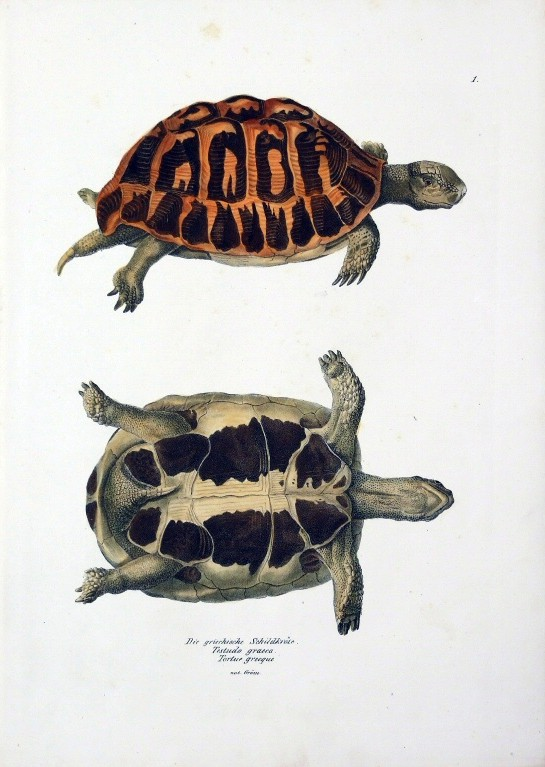
Greek tortoise from "Naturgeschichte und Abbildungen Der Reptilien"

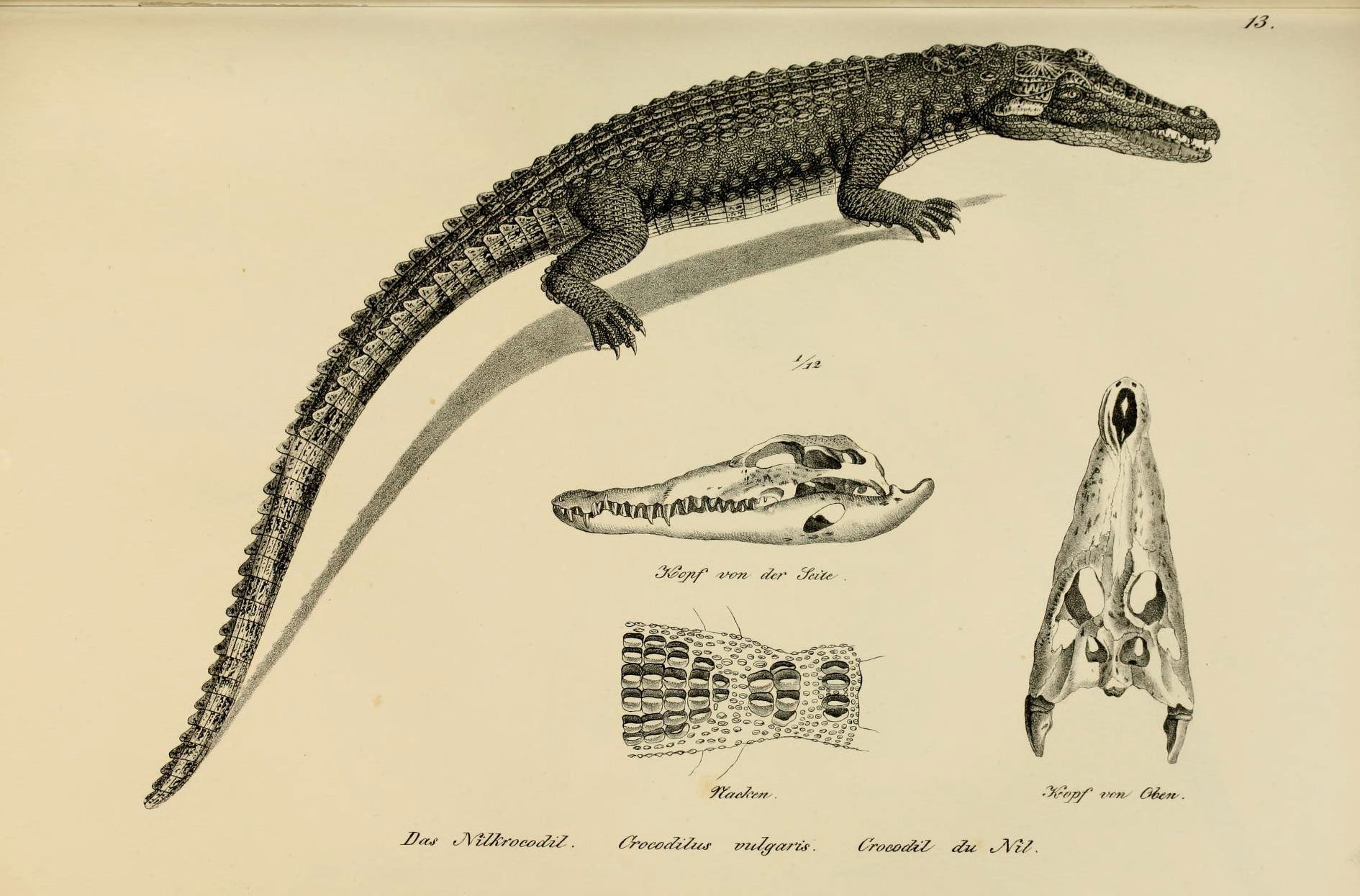
Nile crocodile from "Naturgeschichte und Abbildungen Der Reptilien"

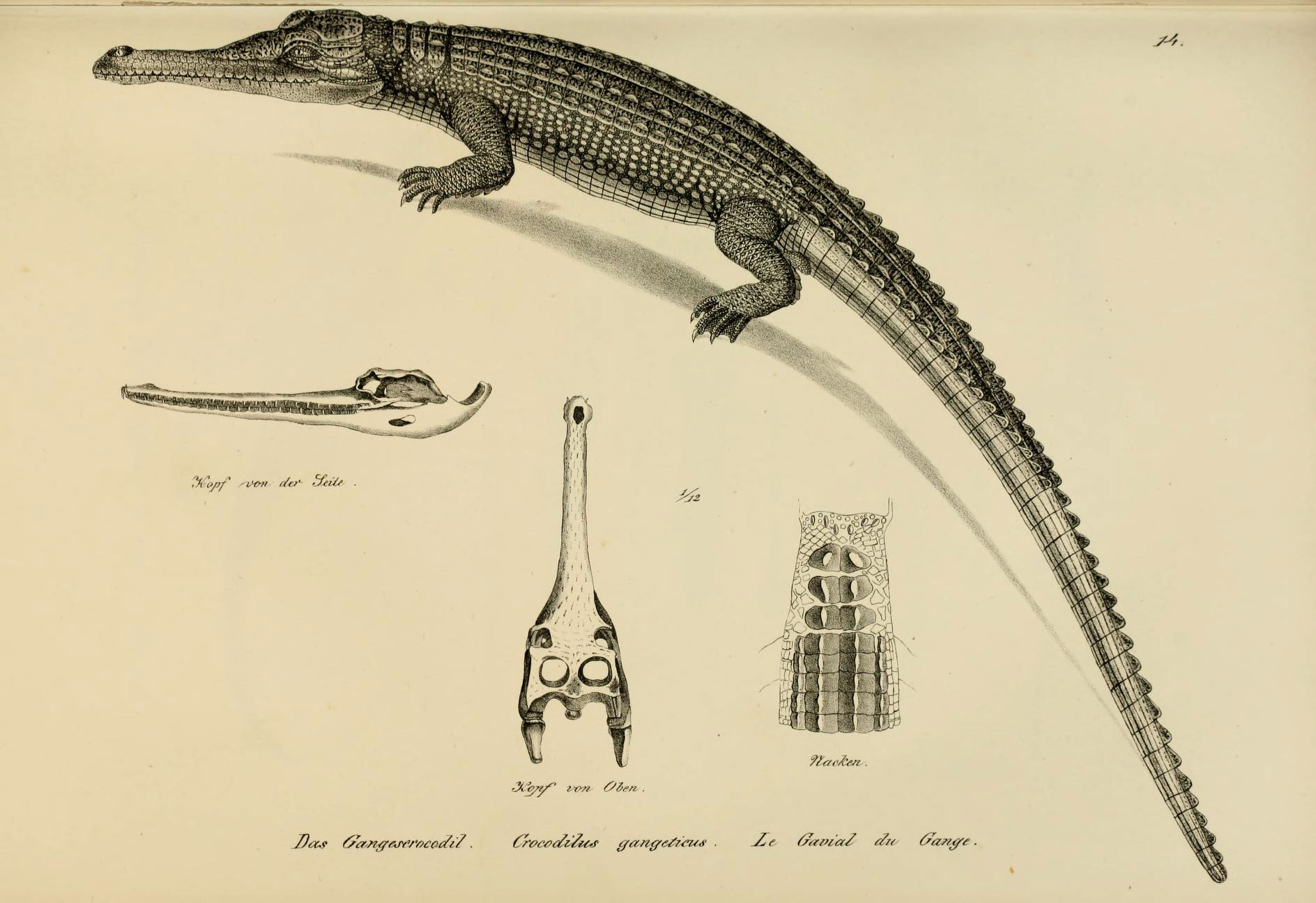
Gavial from "Naturgeschichte und Abbildungen Der Reptilien"
