= Adolf Horion =

German entomologist

Adolf Horion (12 July 1888, in Hochneukirch – 28 May 1977, in Überlingen) was a German entomologist who specialised in Coleoptera.

== Major works ==
- Nachtrag zu FAUNA GERMANICA, Die Käfer des Deutschen Reiches von Edmund Reitter, Hans Goecke Verlag, Krefeld 1935
- Faunistik der Mitteleuropäischen Käfer, Bd. I, Adephaga - Caraboidea., Kommissionsverlag Goecke, Krefeld 1941
- Faunistik der Mitteleuropäischen Käfer, Bd. II, Klostermann, Frankfurt 1949
- Käferkunde für Naturfreunde, Klostermann, Frankfurt 1949
- Verzeichnis der Käfer Mitteleuropas, Alfred Kernen Verlag, Stuttgart 1951
- Faunistik der Mitteleuropäischen Käfer, Bd. III, Malacodermata, Sternoxia (Elateridae - Throscidae)., Eigenverlag Museum Frey, München 1953
- Faunistik der Mitteleuropäischen Käfer, Bd. IV, Sternoxia (Buprestidae), Fossipedes, Macrodactylia, Brachymera., Eigenverlag Museum Frey, Tutzing bei München 1955
- Faunistik der Mitteleuropäischen Käfer, Bd. V, Heteromera, Tutzing 1956
- Faunistik der Mitteleuropäischen Käfer, Bd. VI, Lamellicornia, Kommissionsverlag Buchdruckerei Aug. Feyel 1958
- Faunistik der Mitteleuropäischen Käfer, Bd. VII, Clavivornia, 1. Teil, (Sphaeritidae bis Phalacridae)., Kommissionsverlag Buchdruckerei Aug. Feyel 1960
- Faunistik der Mitteleuropäischen Käfer, Bd. VIII, Clavicornia II, Verlagsdruckerei PH. C. W. Schmidt, Neustadt a. d. Aisch 1961
- Faunistik der Mitteleuropäischen Käfer, Bd. IX, Staphylinidae, 1. Teil Micropeplinae bis Euaesthetinae, Kommissionsverlag Buchdruckerei Aug. Feyel 1963
- Faunistik der Mitteleuropäischen Käfer, Bd. X, Staphylinidae, 2. Teil Paederinae bis Staphylininae, Verlagsdruckerei PH. C. W. Schmidt, Neustadt a. d. Aisch 1965
- Faunistik der Mitteleuropäischen Käfer, Bd. XI, Staphylinidae, 3. Teil Habrocerinae bis Aleocharinae (ohne Subtribus Athetae), Verlagsdruckerei PH. C. W. Schmidt, Neustadt a. d. Aisch 1967
- Faunistik der Mitteleuropäischen Käfer, Bd. XII, Cerambycidae, Verlagsdruckerei PH. C. W. Schmidt, Neustadt a. d. Aisch 1974
- A. M. J. Evers, W. Lucht (Hrsg.): Adolf Horion. Opera coleopterologica e periodicis collata., Goecke & Evers, Krefeld, 1983.
