= Otto Buchinger =

German physician

- Born: 16 February 1878; Darmstadt, German Empire
- Died: April 16, 1966 (age 88); Überlingen, West Germany
- Occupation: Physician

Otto Buchinger (16 February 1878 – 16 April 1966) was a German doctor known for documenting fasting as a potential treatment for certain diseases.

== Biography ==
Buchinger was born in Darmstadt, Germany on 16 February 1878. He studied law and medicine at Ludwigs University. After serving as a physician in the German Navy, he was discharged in 1917 due to rheumatism.

After unsuccessful conventional treatments, he underwent a 19-day fasting regimen under the supervision of Dr. Gustav Riedlin in Freiburg in 1919. According to Buchinger, this led to health improvements, as quoted by his daughter Maria Buchinger, he claimed that he "could move all [of his] joints like a healthy recruit".

Following this experience, Buchinger developed a fasting method as a therapeutic approach. In 1920, he opened his first fasting clinic, Kurheim Dr. Otto Buchinger, in Witzenhausen, Germany. He later expanded to a sanatorium in Bad Pyrmont in 1935. He opened another clinic in Überlingen on Lake Constance in 1953, where he worked with his daughter, Maria, and son-in-law, Helmut Wilhelm. He outlined his fasting method in his 1935 book, The Therapeutic Fasting Cure.

Buchinger died on 16 April 1966 in Überlingen, West Germany, at the age of 88.

== See also ==
- Intermittent fasting
- List of diets
- Very-low-calorie diet or starvation diet
- Autophagy
