= Überlingen =

City in Baden-Württemberg, Germany

- Town
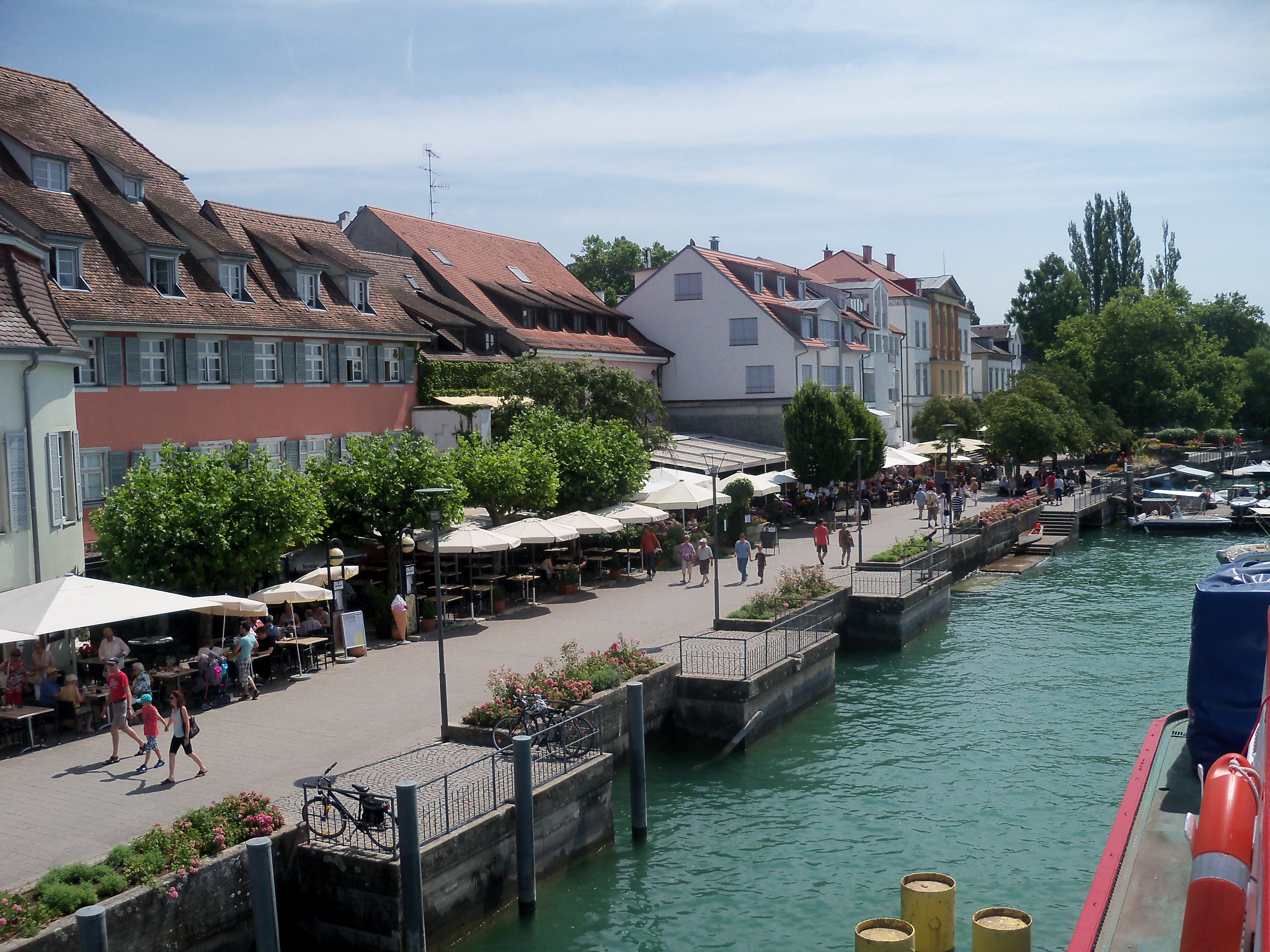

- Coat of arms

- Location of Überlingen within Bodenseekreis district
- Interactive map of Überlingen
- Location within Germany Location within Baden-Württemberg
- Coordinates: 47°46′00″N 09°09′54″E
- Country: Germany
- State: Baden-Württemberg
- Admin. region: Tübingen
- District: Bodenseekreis

Government
  - Mayor (since 2016): Jan Zeitler (SPD)

Area
  - Total: 58.66 km^{2} (22.65 sq mi)
- Elevation: 403 m (1,322 ft)

Population (2025-12-31)
  - Total: 22,799
  - Density: 388.7/km^{2} (1,007/sq mi)
- Time zone: UTC+01:00 (CET)
  - Summer (DST): UTC+02:00 (CEST)
- Postal codes: 88662
- Dialling codes: 07551
- Vehicle registration: FN, ÜB, TT
- Website: www.ueberlingen.de

Überlingen (German pronunciation: [ˈyːbɐˌlɪŋən]; Low Alemannic: Iberlinge) is a German city on the northern shore of Lake Constance (Bodensee) in Baden-Württemberg near the border with Switzerland. After the city of Friedrichshafen, it is the second-largest city in the Bodenseekreis (district), and a central point for the outlying communities. Since 1 January 1993, Überlingen has been categorized as a large district city (Große Kreisstadt).

== History ==
The history of Überlingen dates back to Roman times, but a variety of settlements antedated Roman occupation. Stone Age settlements, discovered along the shoreline of Lake Constance, document that the lake supported several dozen thriving communities of 50–100 individuals. These settlements fall under the category of the Hallstatt culture, and their habits, dress, and diet have been illuminated through the excavation of archaeological sites, such as a major site in Hallstatt, Austria, excavated in the mid- to late 19th century.

Similar sites, although smaller, have been found in vicinity of Überlingen - a site near Hödingen, another near Dettingen, by Constance, and a major site near the village of Unteruhldingen, where there is now an open air archaeological museum.

The dead were either burned, or buried in mounds or flat graves; women wore jewelry made of bronze or gold, especially earrings. Tools uncovered in archeological excavation suggest that these communities engaged in a combination of hunting, fishing, and agriculture.

=== Roman and Merovingian period ===
The Alpine lands and the eastern Swiss Plateau were overrun by the troops of the emperor Augustus (31 BCE to 14 CE), who established the Roman writ from the Alps to the Danube, through the efforts of Augustus' stepsons Drusus and Tiberius. According to some interpretations of the Roman records, one of the Bodensee islands, probably Mainau, was the operations base for the military operations in 15 BCE.

The necessities of troop transport and ship building and maintenance required the Romans to possess the entire Swiss shore of the lake, and from these points along the lake, the Romans could mount a double-pointed excursion to the eastern Tyrol and present-day Bavaria, or to the West, in the Rhine valley. The Bodensee region, as a Roman province administered from Augusta Vindelicorum, present-day Augsburg, was governed by a finance official (procurator) under Tiberius's command. The road from Stockach to Überlingen, and then along the lake's shore to Uhldingen and on to Friedrichshafen, and the east–west train tracks, generally follow the path of the old Roman road.

Evidence of conflicts between the Romans, their power waning, and the Alemannic and other Germanic groups, their power rising, appears throughout the region. New settlements appeared on top of burned settlements and old villages and farmsteads were reclaimed first by forests and meadows and then again reclaimed by men. By the latter half of the fourth century, several families emerged as the warrior leaders, capable of fending off minor Roman comebacks, and of protecting themselves, their kin, and their dependents from not only the Romans, but also other groups.

As the Romans withdrew more and more of their forces, to concentrate on the western boundaries or to focus on the conquest defense of Iberia, Franks, particularly Clodwig, or Clovis (482–511), and Goths, particularly Theodorich (471–527), contested for control of the region. Throughout this period, Alemannic dukes maintained their primary seat in Überlingen. The Alemannic Überlingen was first mentioned in 770 as Iburinga. Before that, it was probably known as Gunzoburg (641), the seat of the Alemannic or Swabian duke Gunzo. The probable site of Gunzo's villa has been identified in the northwestern quadrant of the city, just outside the present-day inner moat.

=== Medieval period ===
The Allemannic dukes were well connected to other families throughout Europe; the first wife of Charlemagne, Hildegard, came from the family of Linzgau counts, whose seat in Buchhorn (present-day Friedrichshafen) bordered the lake. Louis the Pious, 814–840, and Louis the German, 843–876, both married women from the Alemannic Welfen families. In the 10th century, the Linzgau fell to an invasion of the Hungarians, and ongoing battles with the Hungarians nearly brought the families of the region to ruin.

The Investiture Controversy of the 11th century brought further conflict. Villages and properties in the possession of one side of the conflict would be besieged and destroyed by members of the other party, in battle after gruesome battle, but by the end of the 11th century and the first half of the 12th, the Hohenstaufen emperors stabilized the Holy Roman Empire. The family came from the region, and Swabia, the Linzgau, and the Bodensee region became the middle point of the Empire.

This is also the beginning of Überlingen's period of blossoming. Many of the documents from the period have been lost, possibly in the city fire in 1279, but a great deal of information can be extrapolated. Hand-in-hand with the expansion of the Holy Roman Empire, localities throughout the empire experienced infrastructure improvements - improved roads and exchange regulations encouraged trade, particularly in the all-important, centrally located Swabia. The exact date in which the city received its market rights is ambiguous, but it was probably between 1180 and 1191; maps showing the trading road from Stockach to Buchhorn show the city of Überlingen in comparable size and type; by 1226 Überlingen had a Jewish cemetery, and these clues lead to the conclusion that the city had a market for a much longer period than this, thus the supposition that Emperor Barbarossa had established the market at the end of his own regime. He had been in the region several times: 1153, 1155, 1162, 1181, 1183, to hold court sessions, and in 1187, he stayed in Wallhausen, across the lake, to sign the documents establishing the Cloister of Salem.

At the end of the 14th century, the city was granted status as a free imperial city. In 1547, the Holy Roman Emperor, Charles V, broadened the city's market rights to prohibit any trade in grain or salt within two German miles (about 15 km or 10 English miles) of the city.

=== Early modern period ===
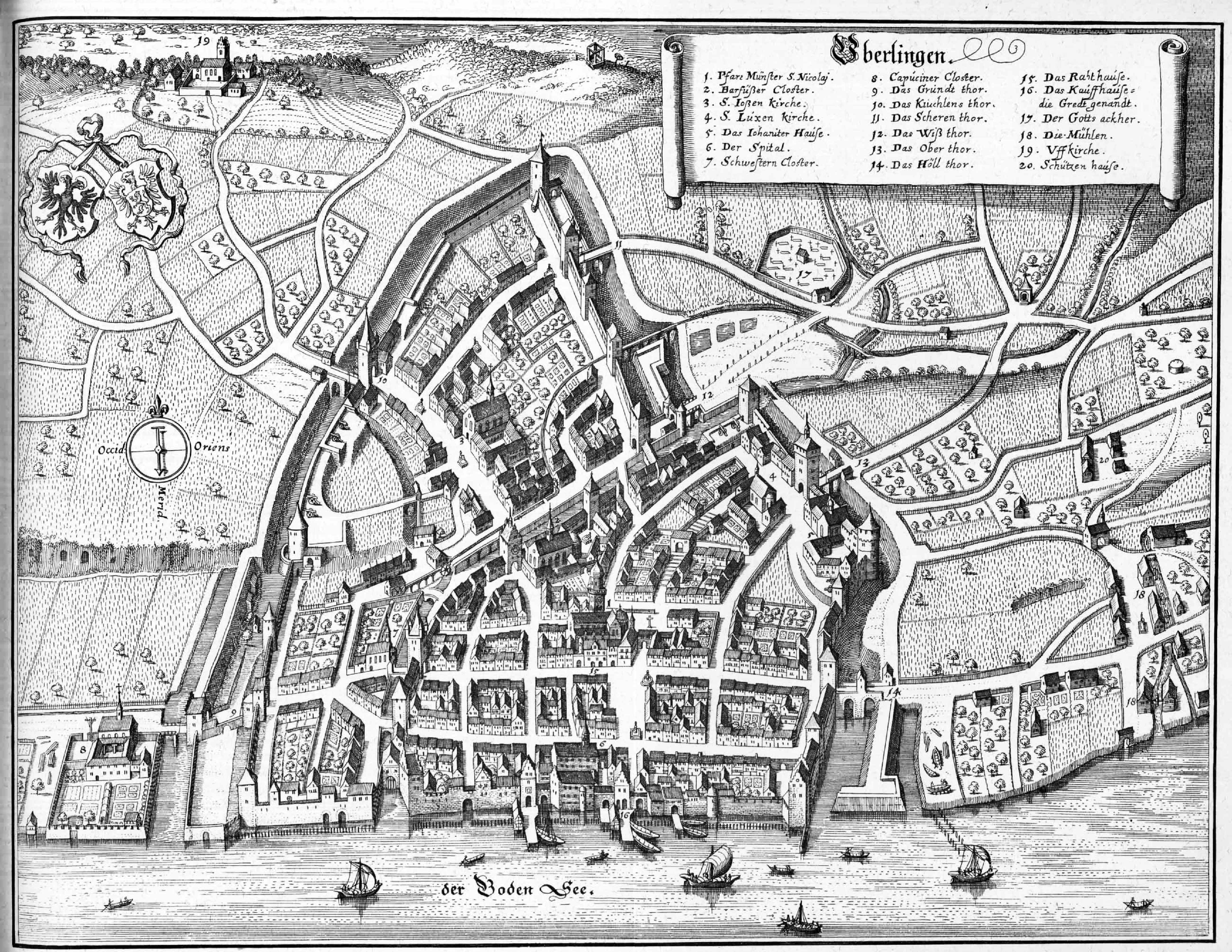
Überlingen 1640–1650, engraving by Mathäus Merian

The city flourished in the 13th to 16th centuries, mainly due to widespread grapevine cultivation on the south-facing slopes of the Lake Constance and its salubrious climate, which gave rise to a profitable spital (hospital) industry. The Holy Ghost Spital in Überlingen held large landholdings in Upper and Lower Linzgau, and in the Hegau. The city's affluence encouraged the construction of an impressive religious building - the St Nikolaus Munster in the late 15th century; a City Hall in the late 15th century; and impressive residences for the family of the spital doctors. The relative affluence of the city has been documented in its art and architecture, and the size and solidity of its physical plant, especially its fortifications.

As a fortified bridgehead, the city proved vital to the reduction of the German Peasants' War in 1525. When Georg Truchsess von Waldburg's soldiers rose against him during the war, and besieged Radolfzell, the Burgermeister of Überlingen led a small force to free the nearby town; they returned with 150 prisoners, all of whom were executed in a single day by the city's executioner. As a result of this assistance, Überlingen was granted the right to quarter a shield with a drawn sword, the Habsburg hawk, and the imperial eagle. As a result of its participation and assistance, the city retained its guild rights after the Schmalkaldic War of the 1540s and 1550s. In the Thirty Years War, the city was invested and besieged by Swedish soldiers and their Saxon allies in 1632 and 1634; despite lengthy and grueling siege, the city defenses held. Even when the walls were breached in May 1634, the population was able to resist in street to street, and house-to-house fighting, until the invaders withdrew. This seemingly miraculous occasion was attributed to the intervention of the Virgin Mary, and every year the citizens of Überlingen hold a so-called Sweden Procession. Another assault on the city in 1643 resulted in a French occupation until Franz von Mercy's Imperial-Bavarian army recaptured it in 1644. As a result of the Truce of Ulm ending hostilities between Bavaria and the allies Sweden and France, Swedish troops occupied the city in 1647–1649.

=== Annexation by the Duchy of Baden: 1803–1918 ===
With the Reichsdeputationshauptschluss in 1803, Überlingen lost its status as a free imperial city, and its legal, economic, and political autonomy. As part of the German Mediatisation process, through which several of the German dynasties that lost lands and subjects on the west bank of the Rhine were compensated with other territories and populations, Überlingen became a part of the duchy of Baden, later the Grand Duchy of Baden. Through 13 organization edicts, the Duchy of Baden administration reorganized formerly free territories into a new ducal organization. For Überlingen, this meant the restructuring of the entire apparatus of administration and governance. Organization edicts deconstructed Überlingen's consular system of mayors, in which two men were elected to the office for one year, the first serving until immediately after Christmas, and the second from then until the new election in the spring. The once free imperial city became the administrative seat for the district (Bezirksamt).

Despite the relative importance of its position of administrative authority, the city entered a nearly century-long economic decline, exacerbated in the first decade of ducal authority by the Year without Summer, a consequence of the Tambora volcanic eruption in 1815, which had a VEI–7 index.

In the revolutionary period, 1848–1849, Überlingen experienced its share of turmoil. Überlingen's own militia apparently enjoyed an early occupation of the wine cellars at the former Salem Abbey, which after 1803 became a ducal palace and winery, but revolutionary activity extended more deeply into the social fabric. In early July 1848, Prussian and Bavarian troops invaded the Bodensee region, and imposed a form of military rule; several important personages, including Überlingen's physician and one of its schoolteachers, drew lengthy prison sentences for their revolutionary activity, nine months and a year, respectively. One of the former abbeys served as a prison for revolutionary convicts. Two companies of Prussian troops, about 400 men plus their officers, occupied the city until late 1850, when they were replaced by ducal troops. Although no sons of Überlingen fought in the civil war with Austria (Austro-Prussian War), Baden preferred to remain outside the conflict, and 72 of Überlingen's young men were called to fight the war with France in 1870; three of them fell in action and are commemorated in the parish church, St. Nikolaus. From 1846 to 1910, around 300 Überlingen sons and daughters emigrated to Switzerland, North or South America, or Australia.

=== Überlingen as a spa ===
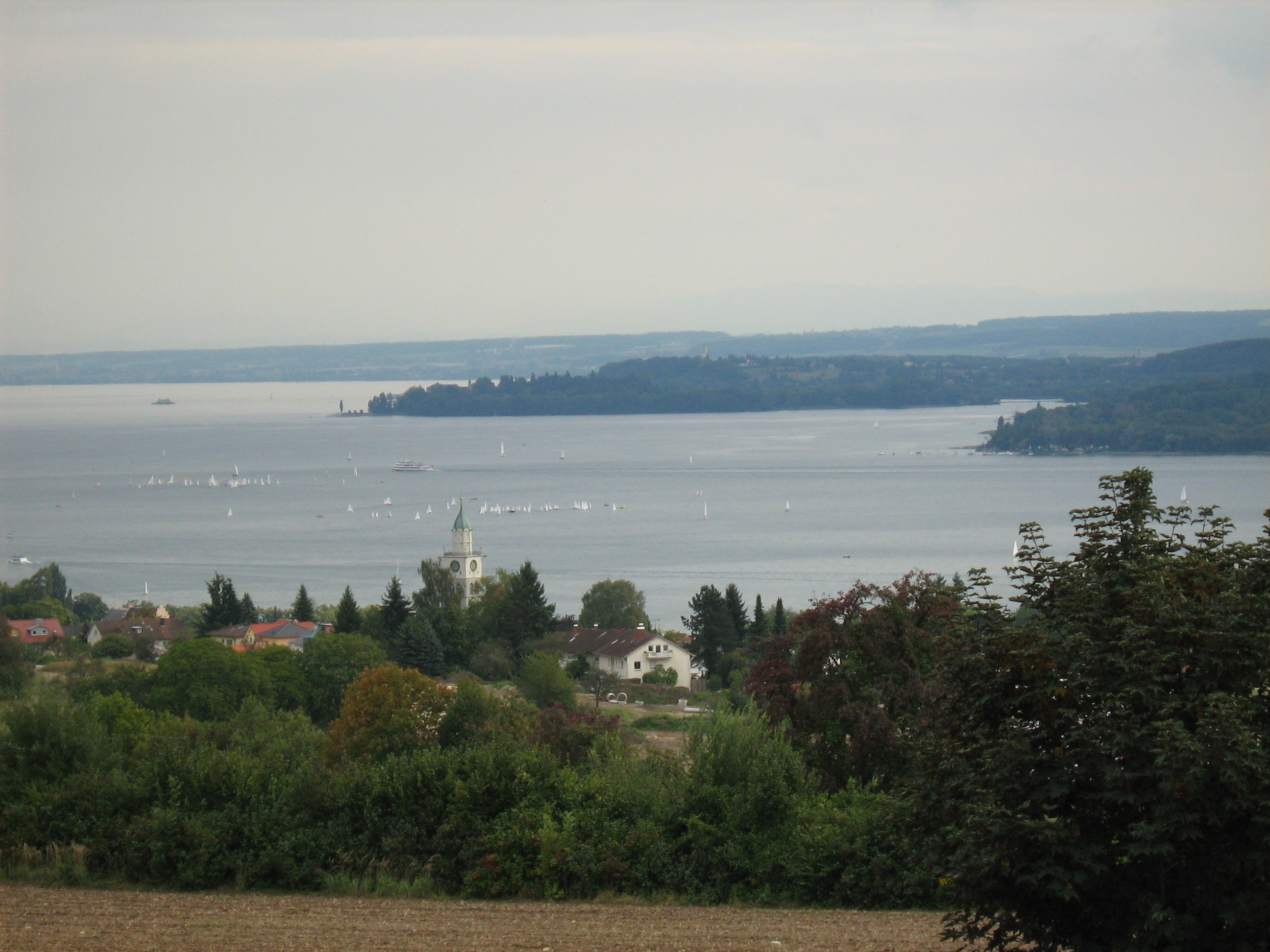
Überlingen with Lake Constance in the background

The healing properties of the city's mineral waters, which sprang from a source under one of the towers on the western side of the city wall, had been understood since the early 16th century, and produced a regular source of income for the city and the spital; during the Thirty Years' War, the spring had been covered over; it remained covered in the postwar period and then was largely forgotten. It was fortuitously "rediscovered" during Überlingen's difficult times. A spa hotel was constructed and the notables started to arrive: Heinrich Zschokke (1771–1848), Ludwig Uhland, the poet (1787–1862), Gustav Schwab (1792–1850), and Germanist Franz Pfeiffer (1815–1868) were regular visitors. A pathway along the western wall, to the highest point within the city gates, is still called the Uhland walkway, and a marker notes that this was one of the poet's favorite walks.

The economic problems were in large part due to the difficulties of transportation. Although the first coal-powered steam ship, the Hohentwiel (named for the impregnable castle on the dormant volcano Hohentwiel by Singen), owned by Joseph Cotta, had traversed the lake in 1825, the city did not emerge from its economic difficulties as a spa city until 1895, with the construction of a railway link to Überlingen. In 1901, the link was connected through Friedrichshafen, making travel to and from the city easier and quicker, and improving the city's prospects as a spa city. The link to Friedrichshafen completed the laying of tracks around the lake. Once the rail line was completed, marketing the city as a spa resort became feasible.

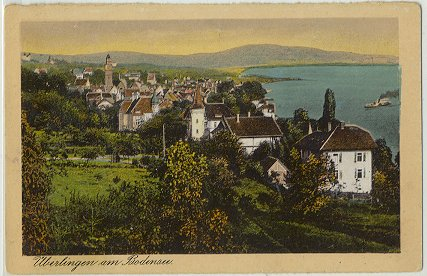
Überlingen c. 1900

=== The Weimar Republic and the period of National Socialism ===
The peaceful life in Überlingen was interrupted by the war in 1914, when 145 of its sons died, and 20 were missing in action. In 1918, with the German Revolution and the abdication of Kaiser Wilhelm, Überlingen became part of the Republic of Baden. For some, "the Revolution in the year 1918 came as a peaceful relief," but from 1918 to 1923, inflation overran the city, and many of the pensioners living there fell on hard times.

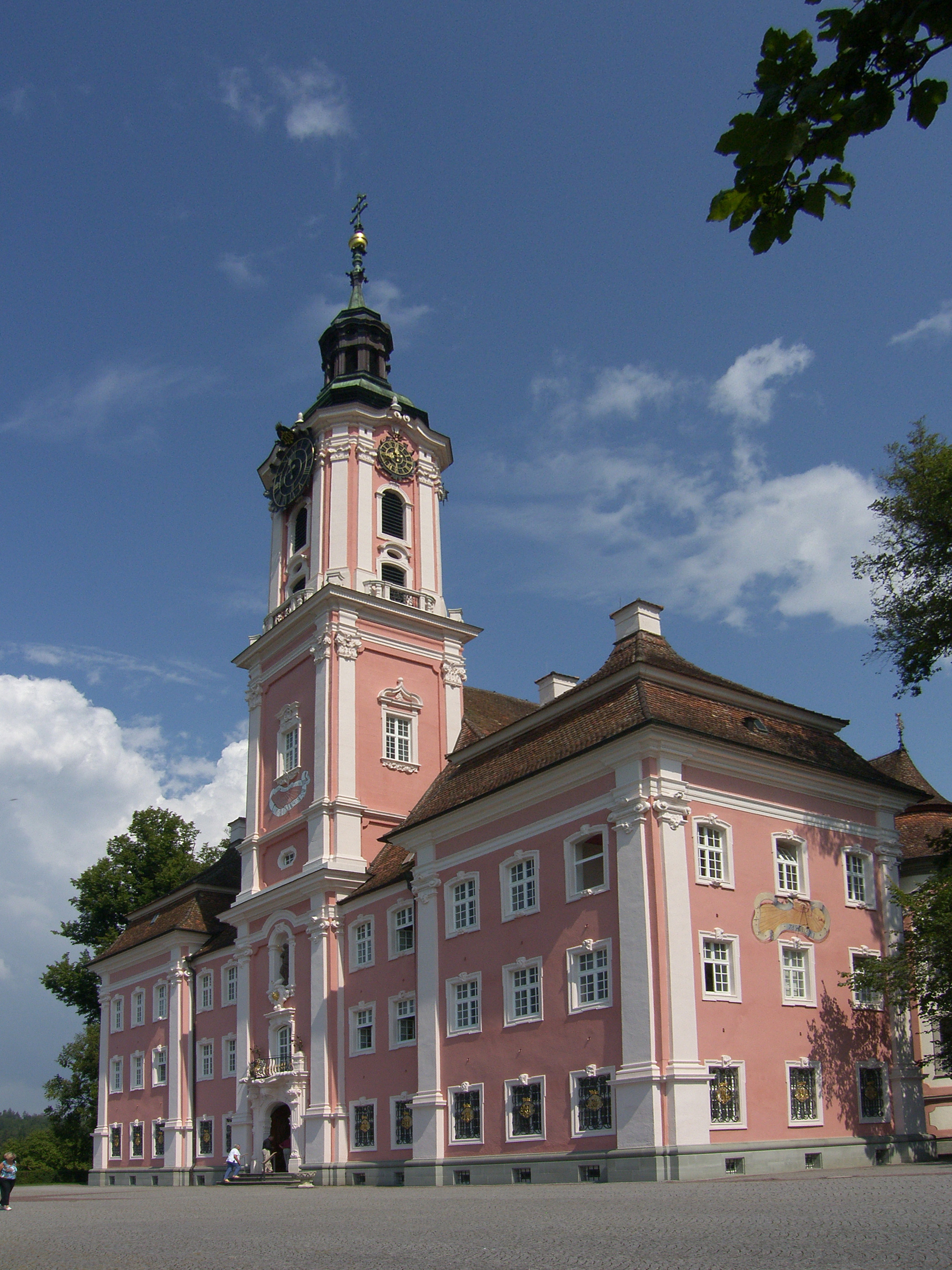
Cloister church Birnau

During the period of National Socialism (Third Reich), a subcamp of the Dachau concentration camp was established on the outskirts of Überlingen (KZ Aufkirch).

From October 1944 to April 1945, its 800 detainees worked in Überlingen, constructing an extensive underground facility, the Goldbach Tunnels, for the manufacture of military armaments. The underground facility, established in natural caves and tunnels, protected the plant from Allied bombing runs. Of the 800 workers, 168 detainees died in either the cave conversion or a misdirected Allied bombing raid. The names of the dead KZ prisoners are listed in the book by Oswald Burger (Der Stollen) as a memorial.

On 22 February 1945, Überlingen experienced its only bombing raid, possibly attracted by the presence of the Dachau subcamp. In this raid, part of Operation Clarion, seven medium-range B–26 Martin Marauders of the US 320th Air Expeditionary Wing dropped 56 500-pound bombs, seveen of them with delay fuses, on the city's rail yards. The bombers had taken off from the base in eastern France by Épinal and dropped their bombs at about 13:45. The bombs destroyed six residential buildings, and severely damaged 17 others; 38 buildings were slightly damaged. Eleven forced laborers, four members of the military construction crews, and five residents of the Upper Station Road 97 are buried in the cemetery in the nearby pilgrim church Birnau. The memorial lies about 200 m (656 ft) east of the church.

Troops of the French army arrived on 25 April 1945, and collected all the arms, munitions and weaponry in the city, to be stored in one of the former guild houses built in the 15th century. On the night of 2 May of the year, a fire destroyed the building and the western side of the market square. The fire is thought to have been started by a careless French sentry.

From 1937, German-Jewish composer Walter Braunfels avoided Nazi persecution by living in near-anonymity in Überlingen. There, he composed music (including three large-scale stage works) and made a living teaching music to the local children during the course of the Second World War.

=== After World War II to present ===
In 1972, Überlingen became the first city in the German Federal Republic to institute a tax for residents who obtain a second home in the city (Zweitwohnungsteuer), which became known as the so-called Überlingen model. With the administrative reform of 1973, Überlingen lost its status as the seat of the County of Überlingen (Landkreis Überlingen). A major part of it was merged with the County of Tettnang (Landkreis Tettnang) to Lake Constance County (Bodenseekreis). In January 1993, Überlingen became a great district city (Große Kreisstadt) granted by the state administration of Baden-Württemberg.

In March 1980, Winifred Wagner, the widow of Siegfried Wagner, died at Überlingen.

=== Überlingen as a resort today ===
By the 1950s, Überlingen had established itself as a premier tourist destination on Lake Bodensee, particularly for those interested in the health cure. Überlingen was Baden-Württemberg's first Kneippheilbad, a homeopathic cure using water therapy, diet, aroma therapy, and exercise, is based on the principles of health developed by Sebastian Kneipp. The city's 2 km-long (1 mi) shore promenade ends at the new health resort (opened 2003), the Bodensee Therme (spa). In 2005, the city and its collaborators, Deisendorf and Lippertsreute, won the gold medal in the competition, Our City Blooms (Unsere Stadt blüht auf).

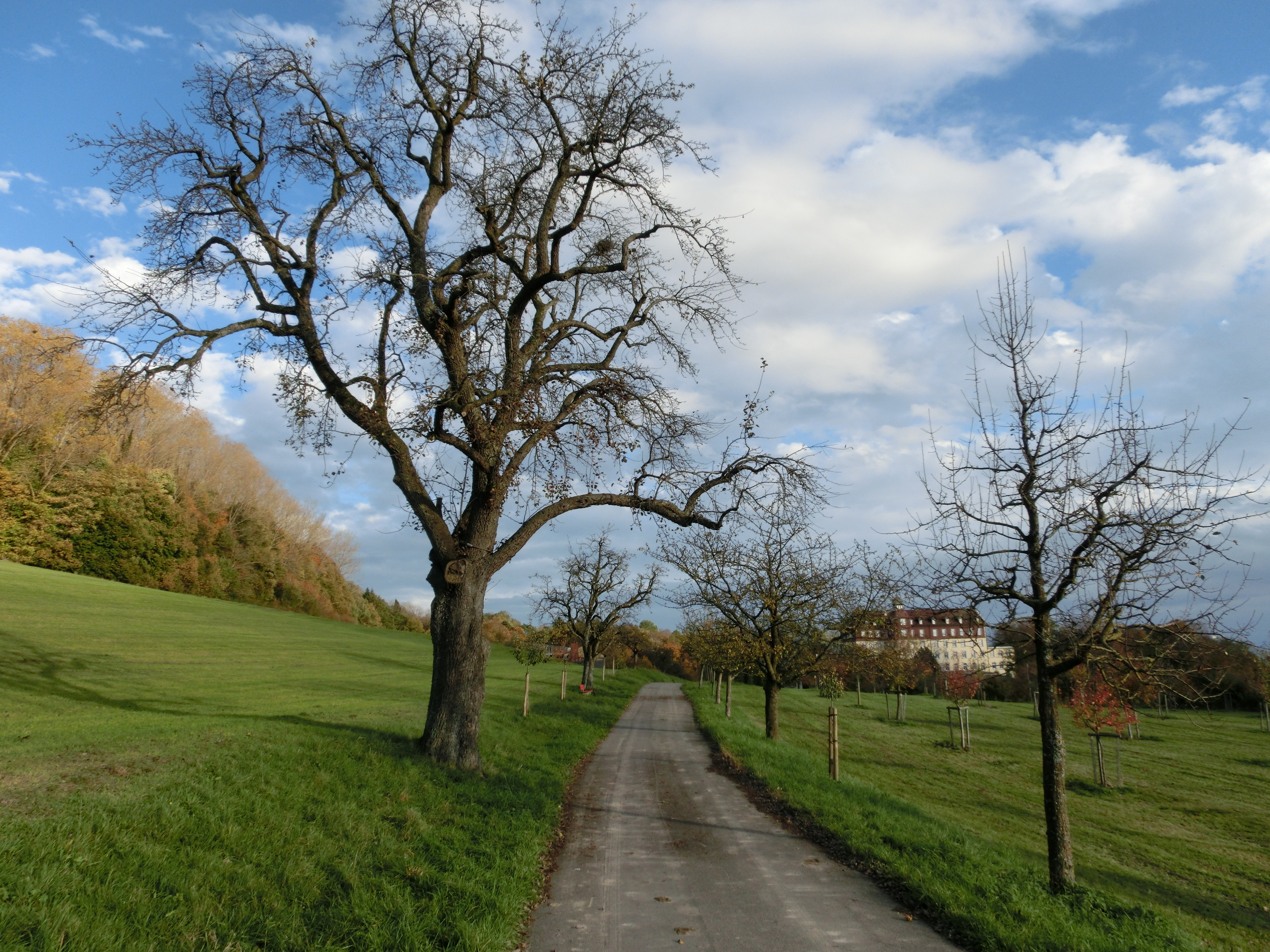
Jubilation Path, through the Spetzgart castle grounds

The city also provides numerous walking paths and is located on the 111 km (69 mi) long Jubiläumsweg, an historic landmark and nature trail through the Bodensee region beginning at Kressbronn and ending at the Überlingen Therme.

Überlingen has also joined the Cittaslow movement to protect itself from overdevelopment. In 2012, the city banned genetically modified organisms and pesticides.

=== 2002 midair collision ===
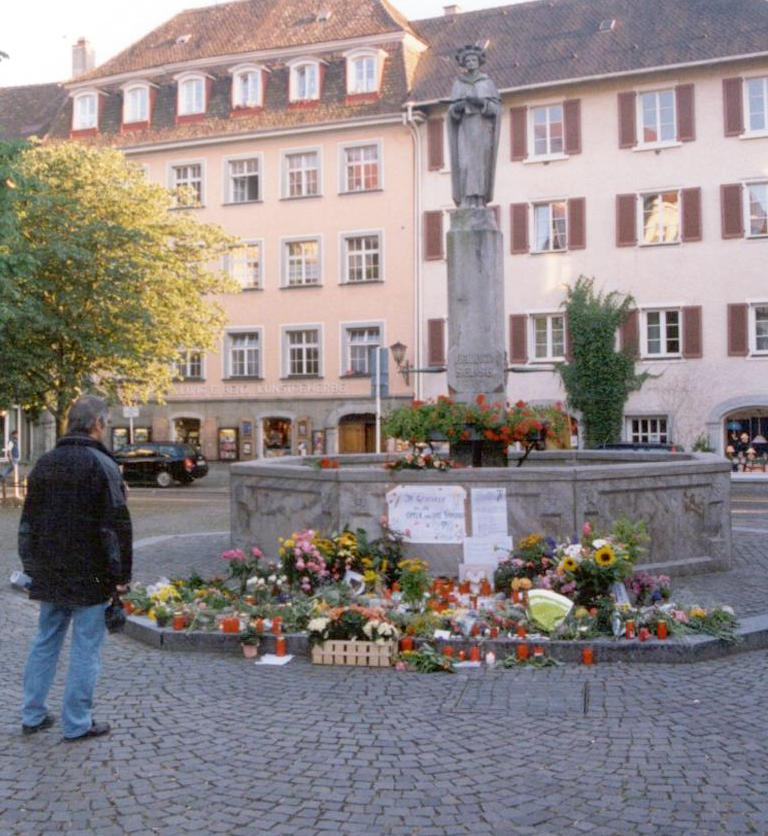
Impromptu memorial for the victims of the midair collision, at the Sosa fountain in the marketplace

The city received international attention in July 2002 with the midair collision of Bashkirian Airlines Flight 2937, a Tupolev Tu-154, and DHL Flight 611 (a Boeing 757-23APF cargo jet manned by two pilots) on 1 July 2002. In this incident, the passenger plane carrying 69, mostly children and a few adult chaperones, who were travelling to Spain, collided with a cargo plane in midair, at about 34,950 ft (10,653 m). The debris fell throughout the northern Überlingen suburbs. Seventy-one people died in the accident, including all the children, their chaperones, and the pilot and co-pilot of the Boeing cargo plane. One of the largest portions of the debris landed in a glade by Brachenreuthe, and the victims of the crash are commemorated there with a string of oversized "pearls".

Less than two years later, on 24 February 2004, Peter Nielsen, the air traffic controller on duty at the time of the accident, was stabbed to death by an architect, Vitaly Kaloyev, who had lost his wife and two children in the accident. Nielsen was 36 years old.

On 19 May 2004, the German Federal Bureau of Aircraft Accident Investigation published its determination that the accident had been caused by shortcomings in the Swiss air traffic control system supervising the flights at the time of the accident and by ambiguities in the use of TCAS, the on-board aircraft collision avoidance system.

== Geography ==
Überlingen is located on the so-called Überlinger Lake portion of Lake Constance, an important water source for southwestern Germany. The countryside is a hilly moraine, formed in the last ice age.

The city is 103 km (64 mi) from Zürich, 40 km (25 mi) from Constance, and 233 km (145 mi) from Munich.

The following cities and communities border the city of Überlingen. Clockwise from the west, they are: Bodman-Ludwigshafen and Stockach, which belong to the County of Constance, and Sipplingen, Bodman, Ludwigshafen, Owingen, Frickingen, Salem and Uhldingen-Mühlhofen. The city exercises legal jurisdiction over the neighboring communities of Owingen and Sipplingen.

=== Administrative subdivisions of Überlingen ===
Besides central Überlingen (the Kernstadt), the town of Überlingen consists of several villages and neighborhoods. Throughout Baden-Württemberg, in the second half of the 20th century, many old farmsteads were developed into neighborhoods. Some of them retained the names of old villages or large farmsteads. Administrative reorganizations consolidated many of these tiny communities into municipalities and administrative districts.

After restructure in the administrative reform of the 1970s, the formerly independent municipalities of Bambergen, Bonndorf, Deisendorf, Hödingen, Lippertsreute, Nesselwangen, und Nußdorf are now included in Überlingen. The townships are unified - today, in the sense that they have their own elections for municipal governments, with a municipal administrator.

Some are listed below:

- in the Kernstadt: Altbirnau, Andelshofen, Aufkirch, Brachenreuthe, Brünnensbach, Goldbach, Höllwangen, Hohenlinden, Kogenbach, Rengoldshausen, Restlehof, Reutehöfe, Weiherhöfe
- to Bambergen: Forsthaus Hohrain, Heffhäusle, Neuhof, Ottomühle, Reuthemühle, Schönbuch
- to Bonndorf: Buohof, Eggenweiler, Fuchsloch, Haldenhof, Helchenhof, Kaienhof, Negelhof, Talmühle, Walpertsweiler
- to Deisendorf: Hasenweide, Katharinenhof, Klammerhölzle, Königshof, Nonnenhölzle, Scheinbuch, Wilmershof
- to Hödingen: Länglehof, Spetzgart
- to Lippertsreute: Bruckfelder Mühle, Ernatsreute, Hagenweiler, Hebsack, Hippmannsfelderhof, In der hohen Eich, Neues Haus, Oberhof, Schellenberg, Steinhöfe, Wackenhausen
- to Nesselwangen: Alte Wette, Fischerhaus, Hinterberghof, Katzenhäusle, Ludwigshof, Mühlberghof, Reutehof, Sattlerhäusle, Vorderberghof, Weilerhof
- to Nußdorf: Untermaurach

=== Architecture ===
The Münster St. Nikolaus is the largest late Gothic building in the region and a city landmark, as well as an emblem of Überlingen. The church has a large wooden altar carved by Jörg Zürn in the late Renaissance. On a pier in the inner altar is a figure of Jakob with his staff and scallop shell. On a wider pier is a cannonball from the 1634 siege by Swedish troops and their allies; it carries the inscription (loosely translated): "Swedish Field Marshal HOX would subdue Überlingen, [his Swedish troops] attempted and lost three stormings [of the city], and afterward he must yield. Maria (Holy Maria) this is your Victory sign". The cannonball was fired into the city and lodged in the main beam of the Hosanna bell tower.

The Sylvester Chapel in the city quarter of Goldbach is the oldest church building in the Lake Constance region, and contains frescoes of the Reichenauer School from the ninth century.

The City Hall was erected during the Renaissance period. The City Council hall is decorated with a cycle of limewood figures carved by master Jakob Ruß. The figures illustrate the hierarchy of the imperial estates, from princes to peasants, arranged into groups of four – the so-called "Imperial quaternions". The decorative programme offers an impression of the power structure in the time of its installation (1490–1494).

The Granary served as the center of Überlingen's once great grain trade and, since its complete renovation in 1998, is one of the most visually appealing cultural monuments of the city. Between the landing place and the market place, directly on the shore of the lake, the classic structure of the merchant and grain house can be seen from Mainau. Since its renovation in 1998, it is a notable cultural monument of the city. Documentary evidence through the proclamation of the so-called Grain Ordinance dates the original building to 1421.

Construction researchers date the load-bearing oak piers to the year 1382. Foundation remnants suggest it was the site of an older building of similar size. The present-day Granary was constructed in 1788 by Franz Anton Bagnato, in the style of the transitional period from Baroque to Classic. Since 1936/37, it has been protected under the Baden State Building ordinance.

The Franciscan church was built in 1348 in the Romanesque style, and in the early 18th century, converted to a Baroque style. It was renovated in the 1990s. The Chapel of St Michael (Aufkirch), outside of the city, was built in 1000, and was the city's first parish church. It and the village were severely damaged in the 1634 siege.

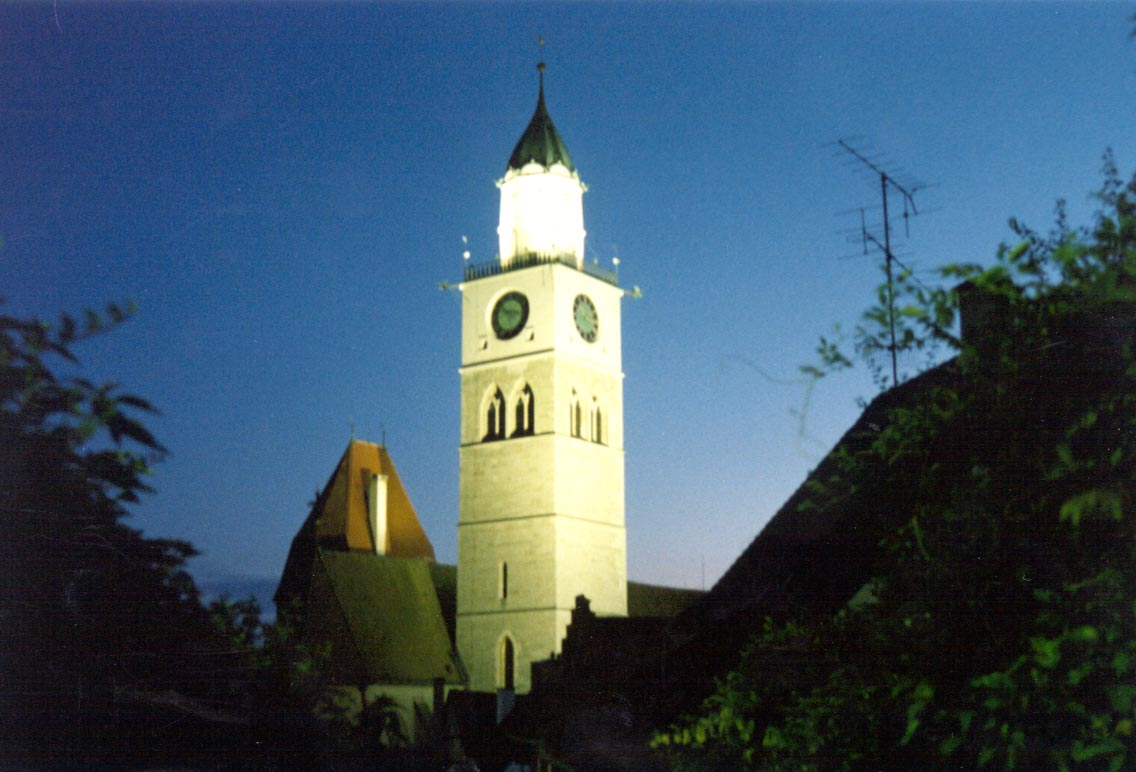
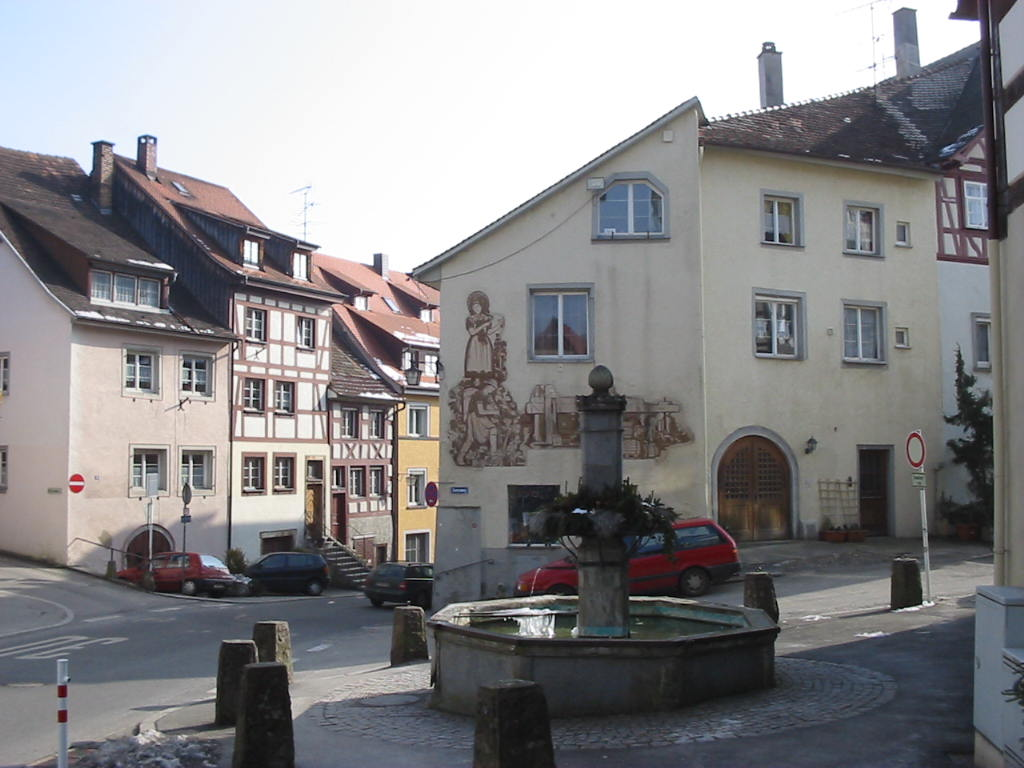
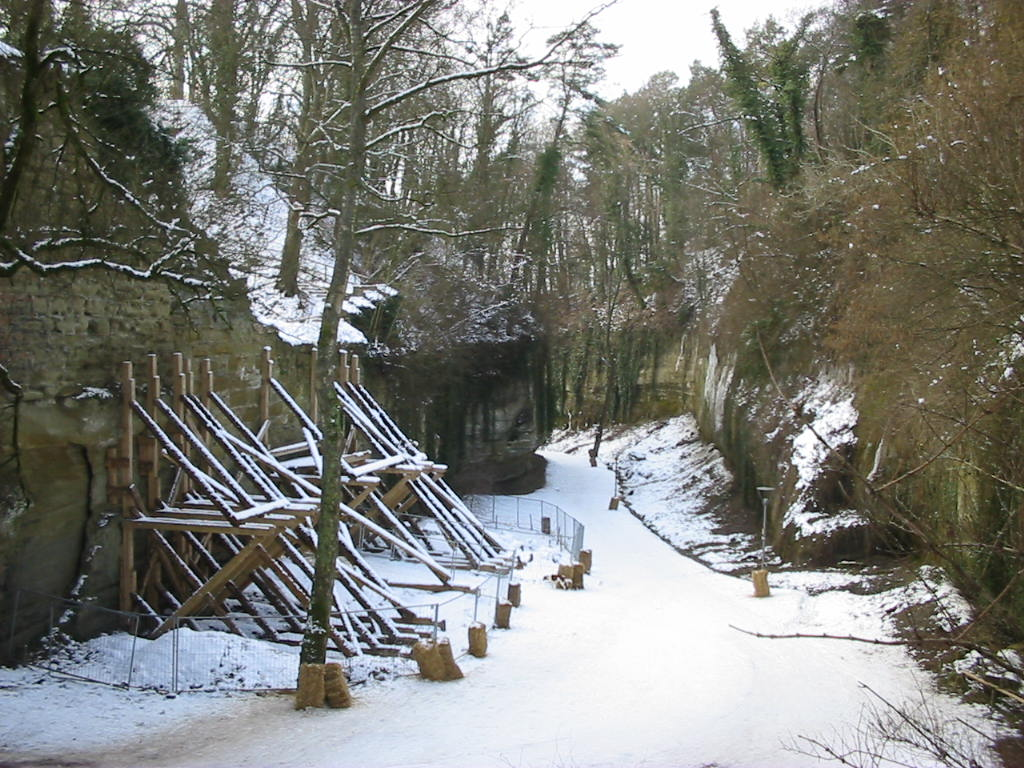
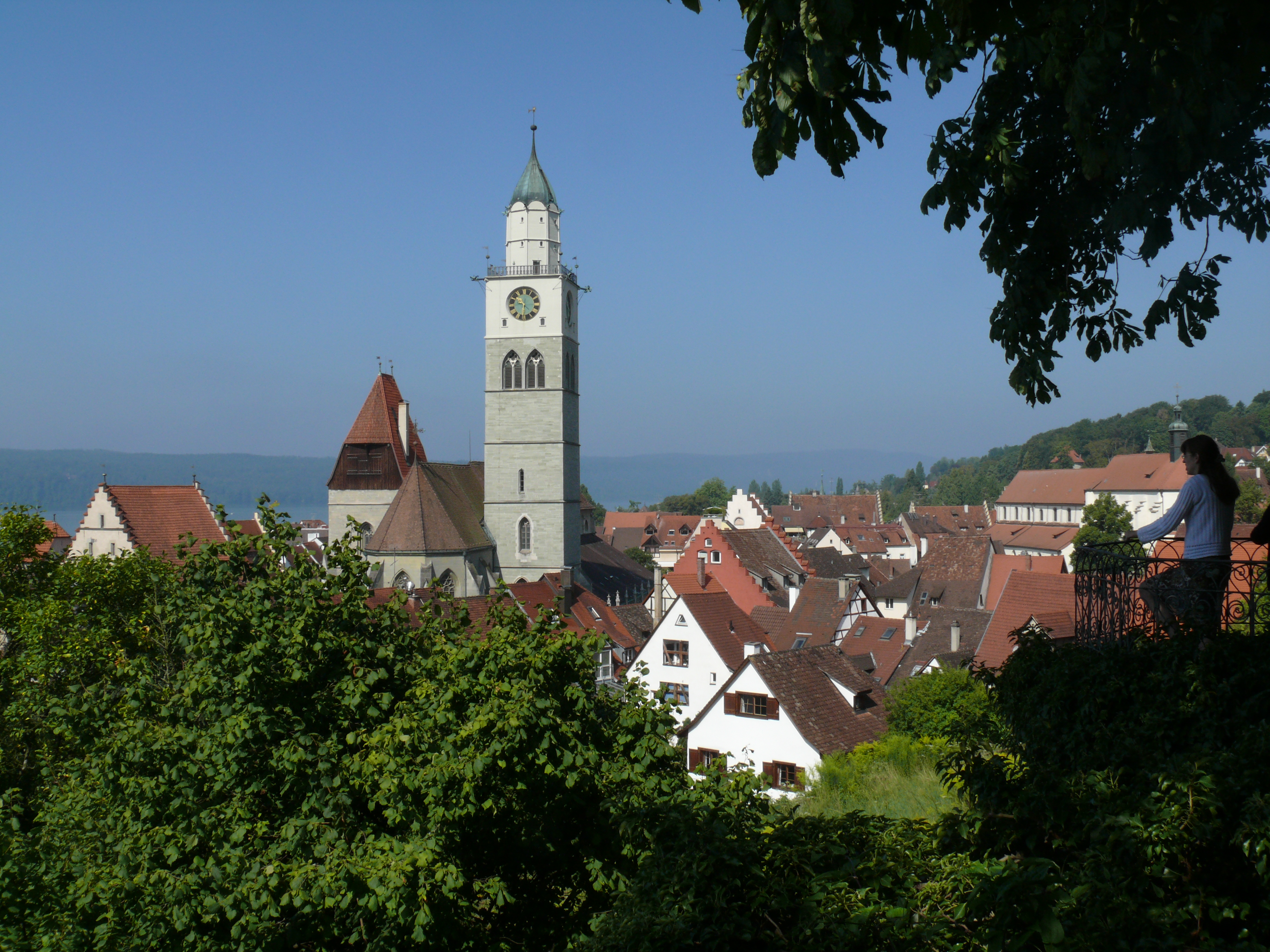
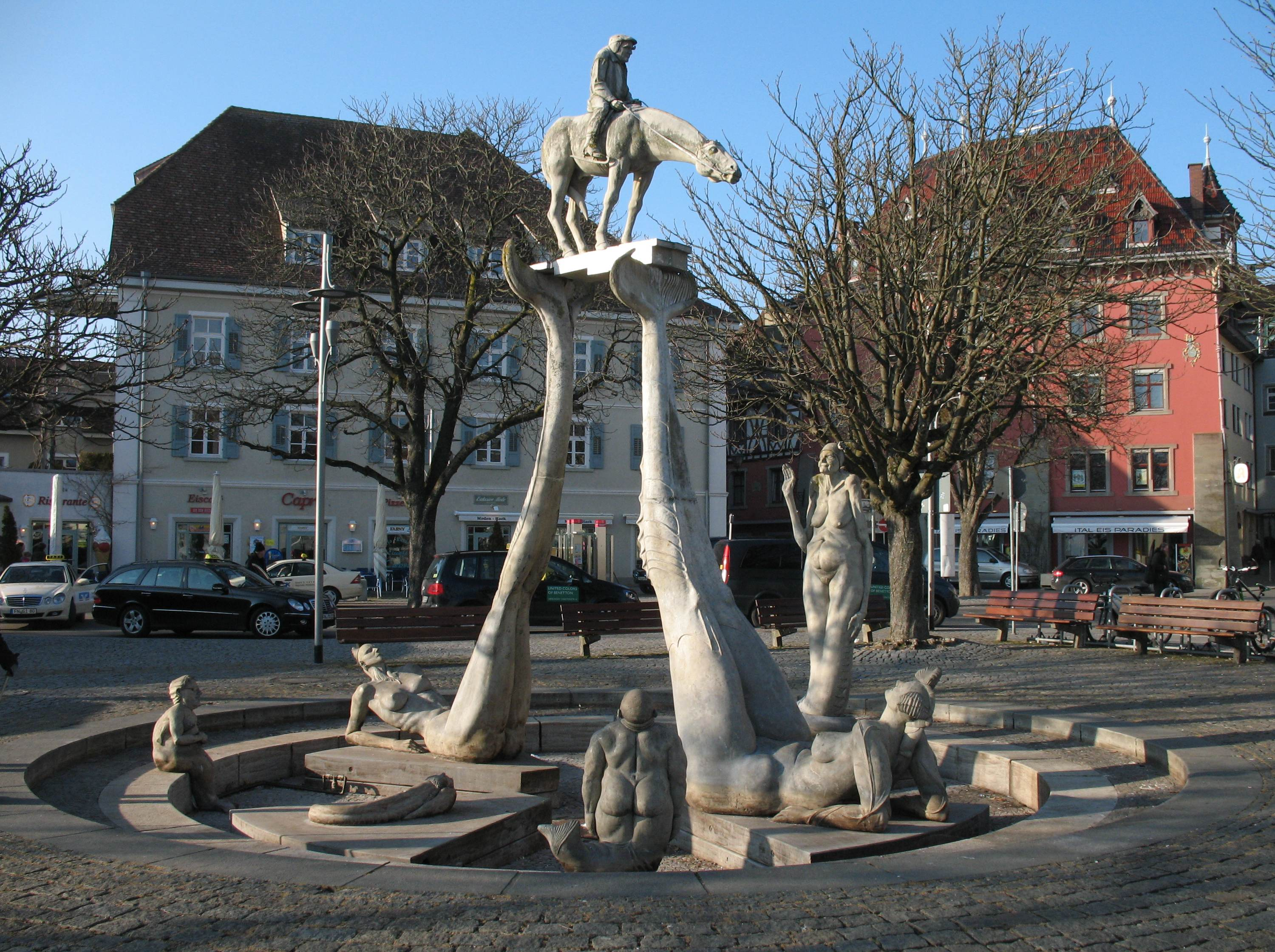
From left: Munster Tower at night; View from the old Village, where the grain and vineyard workers lived; the city was protected by a series of interlocking moats and walls; this is the outer moat, at the western side of the city, by the Aufkirch gate; St. Nicholas Munster (left) and Rathaus (City Hall) (right); Peter Lenk's Bodensee Rider (1999), an allusion to Martin Walser.

=== Geologic anomalies ===
Überlingen's location on the eastern Swiss plateau places it at the end of glacial moraine of the second ice age. The glaciers of the last ice age cut through the region as well, creating a mixture of moraine and glacial cuts, the deepest of which runs through the old forests at Hödingen to the lake. The combination of glacial carving, moraine, and erosion have created several unique geologic formations.

=== Spetzgart ===
The area immediately to the west of Überlingen is known as the Spetzgart, due to its jointed tower formations. The name reflects the region's complex Alemannic language traditions: Spetz (or spitz, meaning point) and Gart (or Garten, meaning garden). The Spetz are an example of the geologic processes that shaped the eastern regions of the Swiss plateau. One can also see the geologic molasse created in the Jurassic and Cretaceous periods. This area is a protected Natural area (see below).

=== Protected areas ===
In Überlingen and its surrounding environs, there are, as of April 2009, three Rural Parks and four Nature Areas, protected by law.

- Protected Natural Areas

The Aach Ravine, 72 hectares (ha), the Hödinger Ravine (28 ha) between Hödingen and Sipplingen, the Katharine Rocks (4 ha) and Spetzgart Ravine (12 ha) between Goldbach und Spetzgart.

=== Climate ===
Despite its distance from an ocean, Überlingen has, depending on the definition used, an oceanic climate (Köppen Cfb), with four distinct seasons. The climate is generally mesothermal with seasonal variations. According to the Köppen climate classification system, Überlingen is a Cfb climate: the C designates climates with average monthly temperatures above 10 °C (50 °F) in their warmest months (April to September in northern hemisphere) and above −3 °C (27 °F) in their coldest months. The f indicates a significant year-round precipitation pattern with little or no difference between the amount of precipitation in the warmer months and the colder months. Decisively for the climate, winds can flow alternately from westerly directions, which often result in precipitation, and easterly, which usually includes high pressure systems and cooler weather than average. The Föhn, a warm wind, plays an important role in the northern alpine valleys and has also some impact on the cities around Lake Constance. The Bise, or east or north-east wind, is especially typical in winter. The most severe weather often occurs during the change of season, when both kinds of winds bring weather fronts that collide.

Climate data for Überlingen am Bodensee, Baden-Württemberg 1961–1990
Month	Jan	Feb	Mar	Apr	May	Jun	Jul	Aug	Sep	Oct	Nov	Dec	Year
Daily mean °C (°F)	−0.4 (31.3)	0.8 (33.4)	4.3 (39.7)	8.3 (46.9)	12.6 (54.7)	15.9 (60.6)	18.0 (64.4)	17.2 (63.0)	14.3 (57.7)	9.3 (48.7)	3.9 (39.0)	0.6 (33.1)	8.8 (47.8)
Average precipitation mm (inches)	55.9 (2.20)	51.2 (2.02)	50.8 (2.00)	69.8 (2.75)	93.2 (3.67)	110.9 (4.37)	103.6 (4.08)	104.4 (4.11)	75.7 (2.98)	62.4 (2.46)	70.5 (2.78)	56.6 (2.23)	905 (35.6)
Mean daily sunshine hours	1.3	2.8	4.2	5.6	6.5	7.5	6.0	7.2	6.0	3.4	1.9	1.2	4.6
Source: German Weather Service

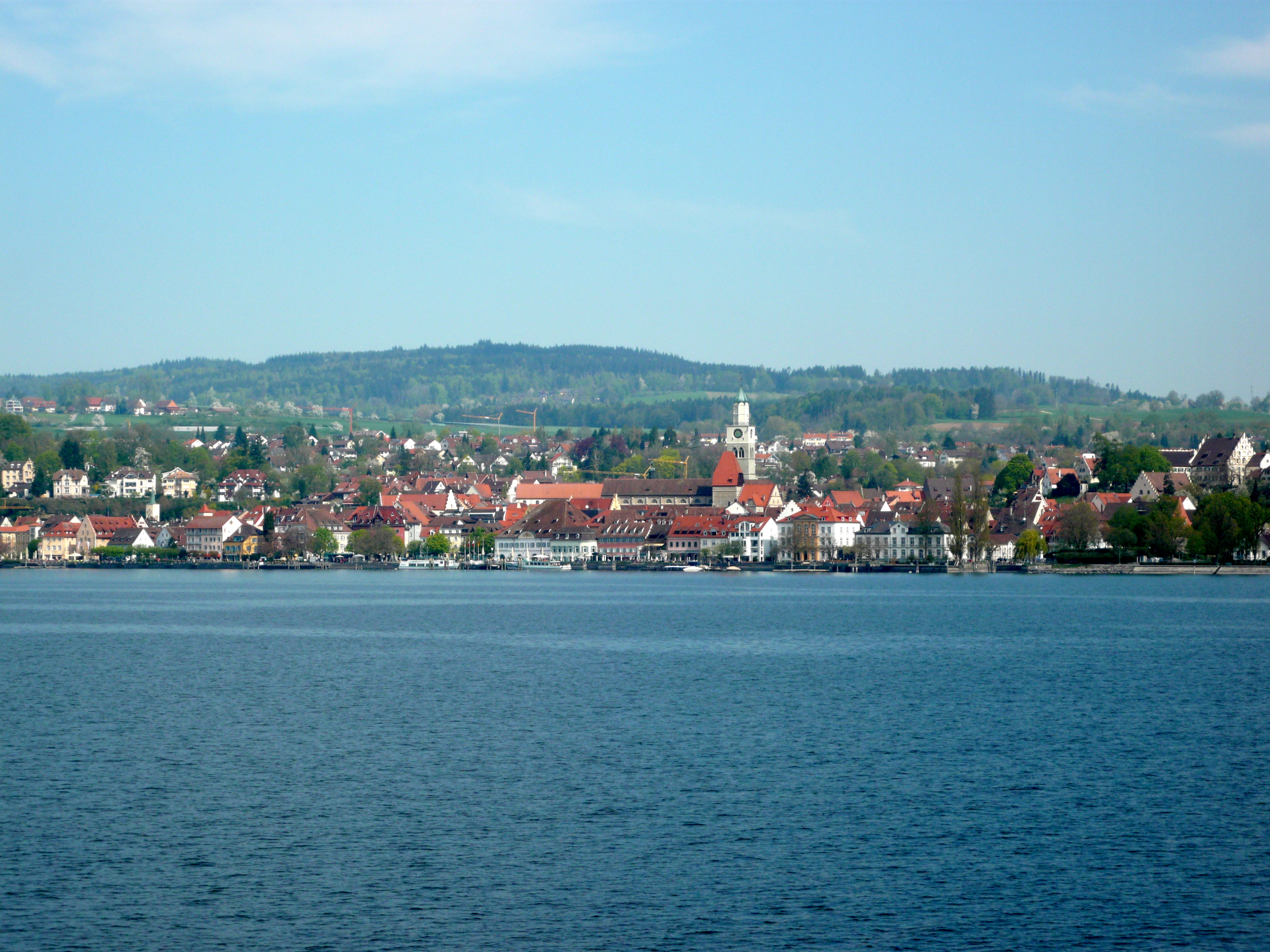
Überlingen, view from Lake Constance

== Demographics ==
Population

Year	Population
1496	3.250
1676	2.338
1789	3.117
1802	2.645
1834	2.505
1861	3.280
1. December 1871 ¹	3.372
1. December 1880 ¹	3.999
1. December 1900 ¹	4.286
1. December 1910 ¹	4.550
16. June 1925 ¹	5.207
16 June 1933 ¹	5.613

Year	Population
17 May 1939 ¹	6.512
13 September 1950 ¹	8.348
6 June 1961 ¹	10.501
27 May 1970 ¹	12.794
31. December 1975	17.735
31. December 1980	18.734
27. May 1987 ¹	18.729
31. December 1990	20.102
31. December 1995	20.494
31. December 2000	20.791
31. December 2005	21.417
31. December 2010	21.818

== Economy ==
Überlingen is home of several high tech industries in manufacturing, defense, and electrical engineering. Among them are:

- Diehl Defence GmbH & Co. KG
- MTU Friedrichshafen Logistics
- RAFI Eltec GmbH

== Culture ==
=== Dialects ===
Überlingen is situated in the area where a variety of Low Alemannic German (Niederalemannisch), Lake Constance Alemannic German (Bodenseealemannisch) is spoken. Lake Constance Alemannic German can be distinguished from High Alemannic German spoken to the south in Switzerland and Swabian, which is spoken to the east in Friedrichshafen and to the north from Pfullendorf on.

=== Fastnacht ===
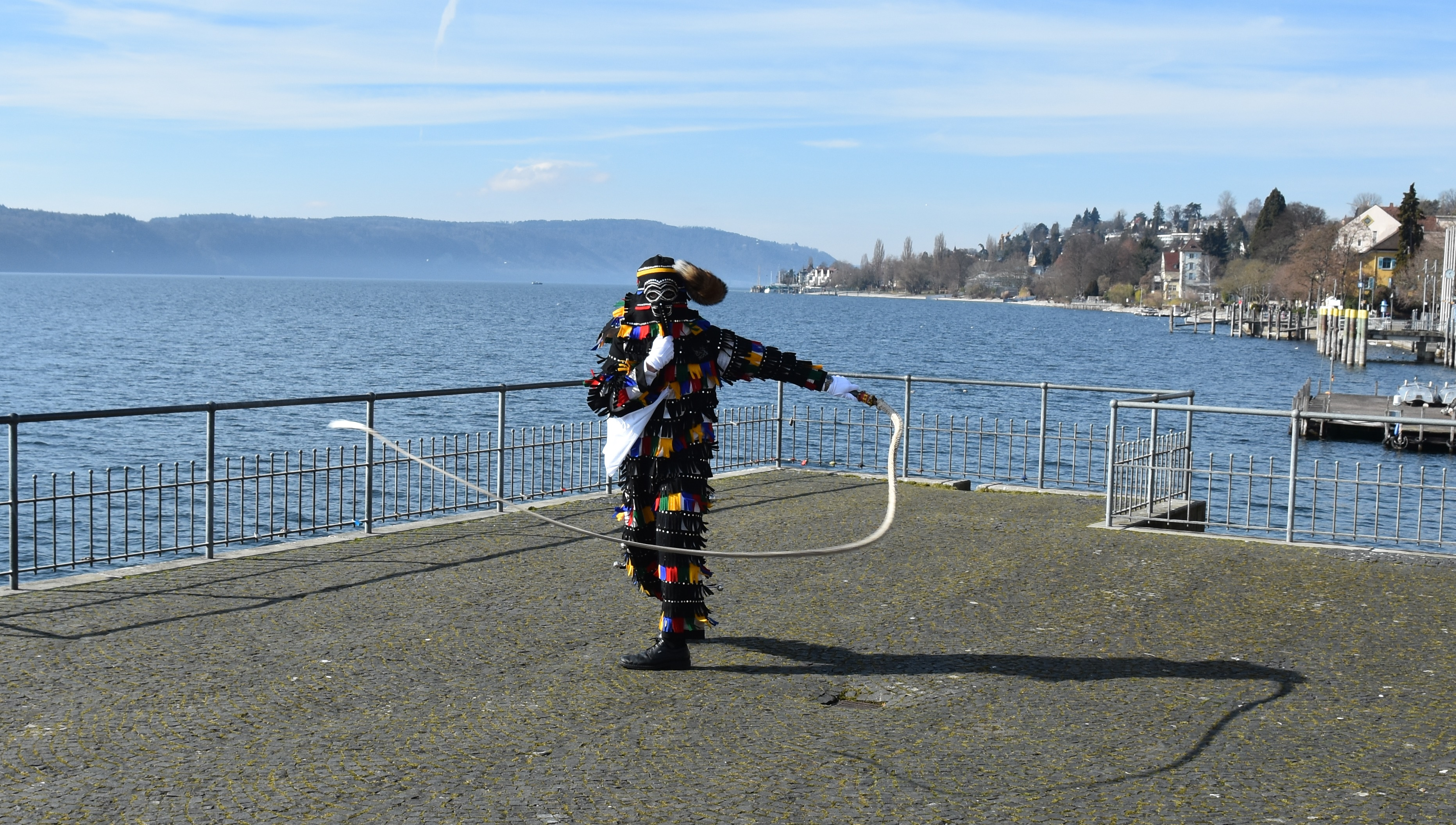
Hänsele, The Carnival Figure

Überlingen is a stronghold of the Swabian-Alemannic carnival. The carnival club, Narrenzunft Überlingen, or the Knaves Guild of Überlingen, is a member of the "Viererbund" carnival union. The carnival clubs of Rottweil, Oberndorf and Elzach are the other three members of this union. The carnival character of Überlingen dates to the 14th century, when it is first mentioned in city council documents; the figure is called "Der Überlinger Hänsele," which would translate roughly, and redundantly, as The Little Jackie of Überlingen.

On St. Martin's Day, in November, the Carnival clubs officially begin their practice; the club members parade through the streets behind a band playing the Hänsele song. Überlingers fall into line behind the Hänsele, and the procession ends with an impromptu rally in the market square. The carnival clubs heighten their activities closer to Fastnacht, the Swabian term for the celebration of carnival (see also Fasching or Fastnacht). Celebrations peak at Shrove Tuesday.

The carnival character, Hänsele, appears in many celebrations throughout the year. There is only one chosen "Hänsele," and he is involved in most civic celebrations; his identity usually remains anonymous. Other club members also dress up as the figure. Hänsele's costume is noted for its colorful felted squares, its fox's tail, and the incense he wears in his hood. In addition, Hänsele carries a heavy whip; prior to Fastnacht, groups of uncostumed Hänseles gather in the market square to practice snapping their whips.

=== Market Day ===
Wednesdays and Saturdays are traditional market days in Überlingen, and have been since the late 14th century when the city was granted market rights. Today's 21st century Market Days bring farmers, fruit growers, wine and brandy producers, honey producers, from throughout the region; in addition to local growers and producers, some come from the Three Corner area by Basel, and others from the Tyrol. Typically, housewives will purchase cheese, bread, wine, fruits and vegetables from these sellers, although items are also available in grocery stores (which sell everything), and specialty stores, which sell single types of items: bakeries, butchers, greengrocers, wine merchants, etc.

Market on Saturday lasts until early afternoon, and participants set up stalls in the market place and the adjacent church plaza. It is complete with a hurdy-gurdy organist, and occasionally other street performers. Sales also include flowers, baskets, and an expanded array of homemade items, including items from local artisans. Market on Wednesday is a smaller affair, and closes early at 1300.

=== Christmas Market ===
The Überlingen Christmas Market, also called Weihnachtsmarkt, and Christkindlmarkt, begins with the celebration of St. Nikolaus day, December 6. Nikolaus is the patron saint of Überlingen. A Nikolaus figure, complete with attendees including Black Peter, travels from Constance by boat, arriving at the city's boat landing. The "saint" leads a procession to the church, and then offers a special mass, particularly for children. In the ensuing 10 days, vendors offer a variety of merchandise from stalls in the Market square: delicately carved wooden ornaments, baskets, leather items, tree decorations, and all kinds of food and treats are available, such as Fladeln, or Wähe, or Wähefladel (more or less Swabian pizza), and the more widely known Würst (sausage), Kraut (cabbage), and Spätzle (little noodles). There is always Glühwein (mulled wine), a heated wine with fruit zest, usually orange peel, and spices, usually cinnamon and cloves.

=== The Sweden Procession ===
To commemorate the successful defense against the swedes in 1634, Überlingen holds an annual procession called the Sweden Procession. The event actually has two components, one in early May and the second in mid-July. Men and women dress in the traditional costume, Tracht, and march in a procession around the city's inner perimeter, the inner wall. A select group of individuals carry the Swedenmadonna, a figure of Mary gilded in silver in 1660.

At designated places (the entry to the old pilgrim church, several gates, a cemetery, and the fountain where Mary appeared to chase the Swedes away) the priest offers special prayers and a small cannon is fired. Since after the second world war, a company of men perform the Swertletanz (small sword dance) following the july procession.

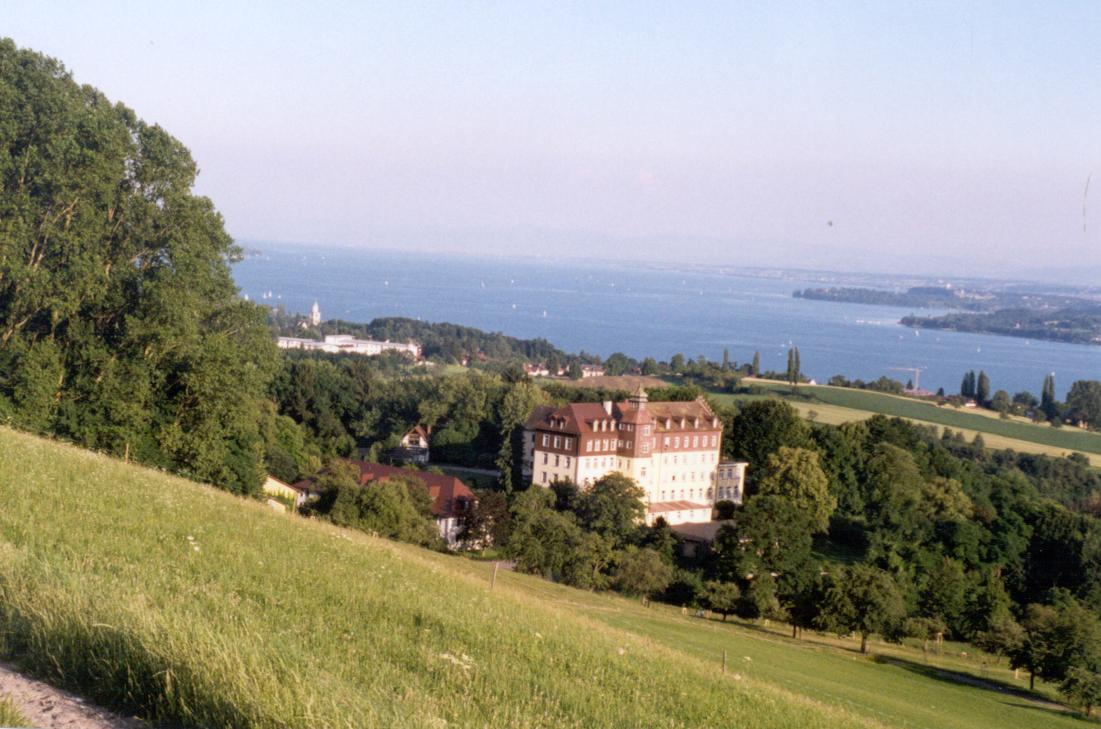
Castle Salem Boarding School, with Überlingen and Bodensee in background

== Law and government ==
=== Mayors of Überlingen ===
- 1308–XXXX: Ulrich am Ort
- 1644–1670: Johann Heinrich von Pflummern
- 1733–1770: Johann Leopold von Haubert
- 1773–1793: Freiherr von Lentz
- 1793–1799: Karl Enroth
- 1799–1802: Johann Baptist Moser
- 1802–1810: Karl Enroth
- 1810–1814: Johann Baptist Moser
- 1814–1830: Johann Baptist Kugel
- 1830–1835: Konrad Magg
- 1835–1847: Karl Müller
- 1847–1849: Hofacker
- 1849: Johann Sebastian Knöpfle
- 1849–1858: Adolf Bernhard Schmalholz
- 1858–1873: Mathäus Steib
- 1873–1879: Wilhelm Beck
- 1879–1885: Mathäus Steib
- 1885–1919: Maurus Betz
- 1919–1933: Heinrich Emerich
- 1933–1945: Albert Spreng (NSDAP)
- 1945: Karl Löhle (SPD)
- 1946–1948: Franz Hug (Independent)
- 1948–1969: Wilhelm Anton Schelle (CDU)
- 1969–1993: Reinhard Ebersbach (SPD)
- 1993–2000: Klaus Patzel (SPD)
- 2000–2008: Volkmar Weber (Independent)
- 2009–2017: Sabine Becker (since 2014, Independent; previously CDU)
- since 2017: Jan Zeitler (SPD)

== Education ==
Several primary and secondary education schools are situated in Überlingen. Most of those schools are public.

=== Public schools ===
There are several primary schools in the city center and the suburbs of Überlingen. Further there is a secondary and high school as well as vocational schools which includes:

- Realschule Überlingen (Secondary school)
- Gymnasium Überlingen (High school)
- Joerg-Zuern Gewerbeschule (Technical school)
- Constantin Vanotti Schule (Business school)
- Justus von Liebig Schule (Biotechnology, social and health science school)

=== Private schools ===
- Waldorfschule Überlingen
- Schule Schloss Salem

== Media ==
The Suedkurier is the main daily newspaper in Überlingen. It has a local section for the city of Überlingen and is represented by a local editing office in Überlingen.

== Transport ==
=== Air ===
The nearest airports are the Friedrichshafen Airport (32 km) with mostly domestic destinations and the Zurich Airport (100 km) with international destinations.

=== Road ===
Bundesstraße 31 (German Federal Freeway) runs from east to west through Überlingen. The section from the end of A 81 (German Federal Highway) to Überlingen has been upgraded in recent decades to B31n, where "n" stands for new.

=== Rail ===
The Stahringen–Friedrichshafen railway runs through Überlingen, through a two section tunnel under the historical city core. Überlingen is served by three stations which are from east to west Überlingen-Nussdorf, Überlingen, and Überlingen-Therme. Überlingen is the main station which is served by inter-regional-express (IRE) trains from Basel German station to Ulm main station and regional trains (RB) from Friedrichshafen to Singen Hohentwiel, while Überlingen-Therme and Überlingen Nussdorf are only served by the regional trains.

=== Water ===
Überlingen is linked to Wallhausen, a suburb of Constance, by ferry, from which the city center of Constance can be reached by bus. In late spring through early fall, regular water transportation links Überlingen with Constance, Meersburg, and the island of Mainau.

== Twin towns – sister cities ==
Überlingen is twinned with:

- Chantilly, France (1987)
- Bad Schandau, Germany (1990)

Additionally, the Überlingen Fire Department is in a formal partnership with that of:

- St. Valentin auf der Haide, Italy (1982)

== Hamlets and villages ==
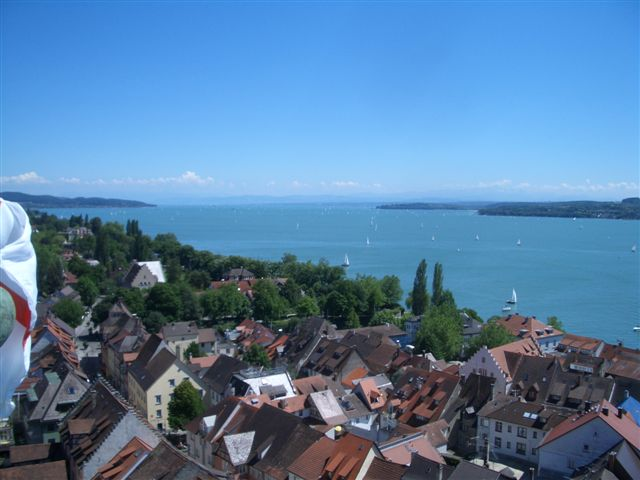
View from the Church Tower

- Andelshofen was first mentioned in 1239 as Andelsowe. The site was the property of the Knights of St. John (Order of Malta). In 1552 and again in 1634, the site was burned to the ground, and later rebuilt. Judicial authority over the village lay with Überlingen. In 1805 Baden annexed Andelshofen, and it was reorganized into a part of the Überlingen administrative district. In 1927, the commune was dissolved and Andelshofen was incorporated into the commune of Überlingen. Its various hamlets came under the administrative jurisdiction of other small towns: Hagenweiler to Lippertsweiler, Schonbuch to the commune of Bambergen.
- Aufkirch was first mentioned in 1242 as Ufkilche. The site was the location of the original Parish Church of Überlingen, St. Michael. The church with its surrounding territory was transferred in 1311 to the Engelberg Abbey, and in 1343 to the Teutonic Order on the Island of Mainau. These came to Überlingen in 1557. From then, the church became a filial parish of the Munster in Überlingen, and village territory went to Überlingen with the status of hamlet.
- Bambergen was first mentioned in 1268. In the 13th and 14th centuries the seat of Regentsweil estate, its property came to the Spital in Überlingen in 1352. The free imperial city of Überlingen exercised both low and high justice over Bambergen and a few smaller nearby hamlets, including Reuthemühle. Accordingly, Bambergen was the seat of several villages and hamlets belonging to the Überlingen Spital. In 1803 Baden annexed the territory and it was reorganized into the jurisdiction of Überlingen.
- Bonndorf was first mentioned in 800 as Pondorf. In the 12th century, became part of the Hohenfels estate. Between 1423 and 1479 it was sold to the Spital, and thus came under the authority of the city. In 1803, Baden annexed the territory and merged it with the community in the administrative district of Überlingen.
- Nesselwangen was mentioned in 1094 as Nezzelwanc. Later, the site came into the possession of the Monastery of All Saints, in Schaffhausen. Later it was part of the lordship of Hohenfels, and from them it came into the possession of the Überlingen spital. In 1803, it was annexed by the Duchy of Baden and incorporated into the jurisdiction of Überlingen.
- Walpertsweiler was originally known as Waltprechtesweiler in 1160, when it belonged to the Cirstercian Monastery in Salem. In 1415 it came into the possession of the Überlingen spital and since the annexation by Baden (1803) is part of the community of Bonndorf.

== Notable people ==
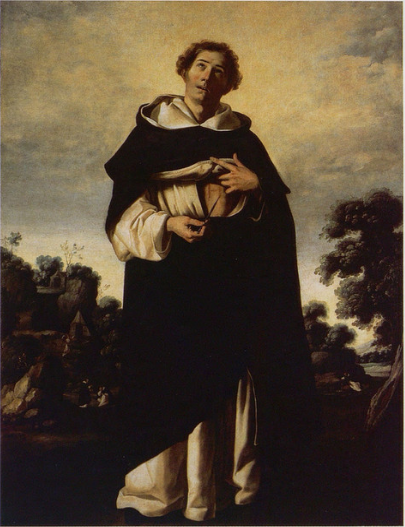
Painting of the Blessed Henry Suso

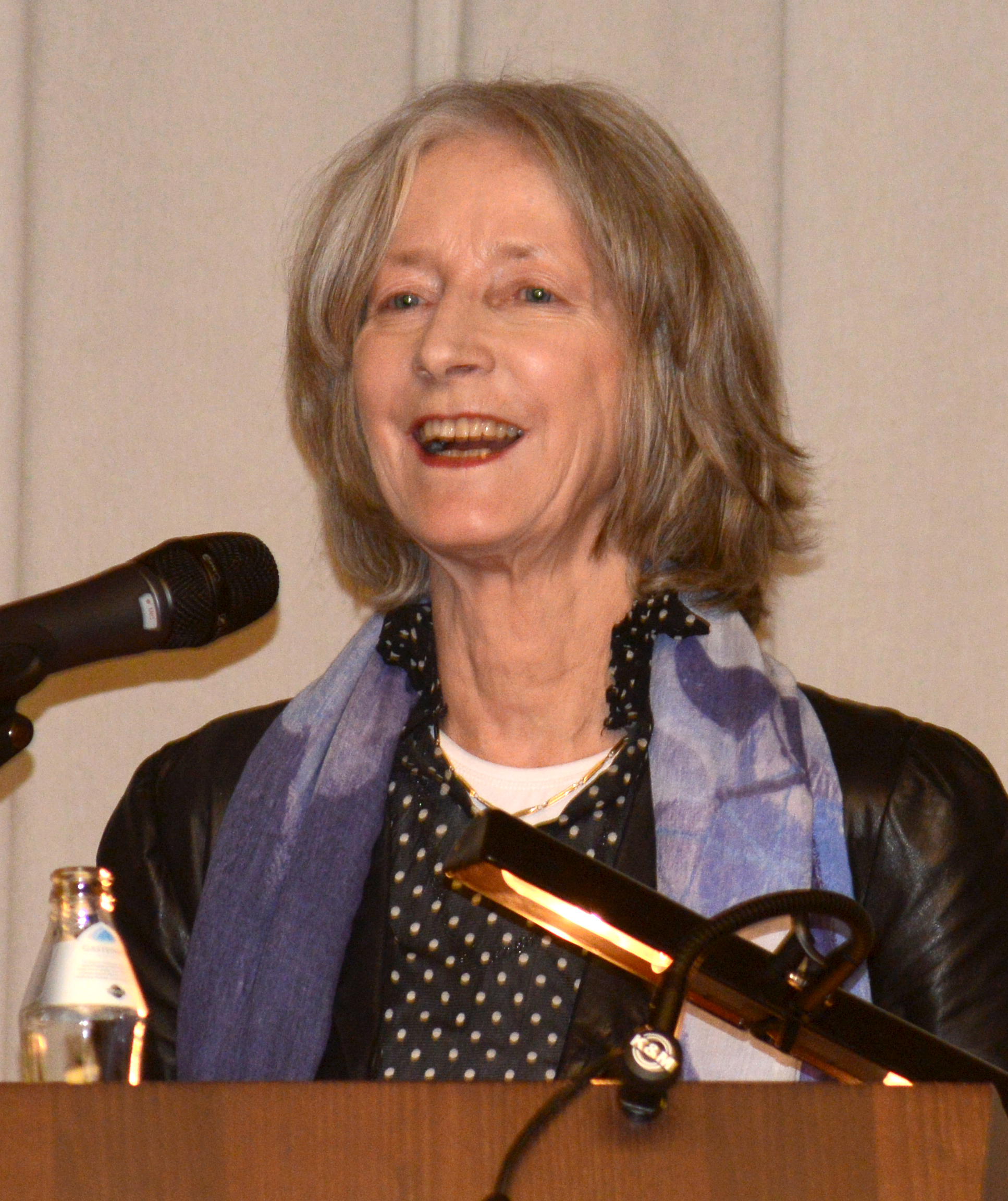
Nike Wagner, 2014

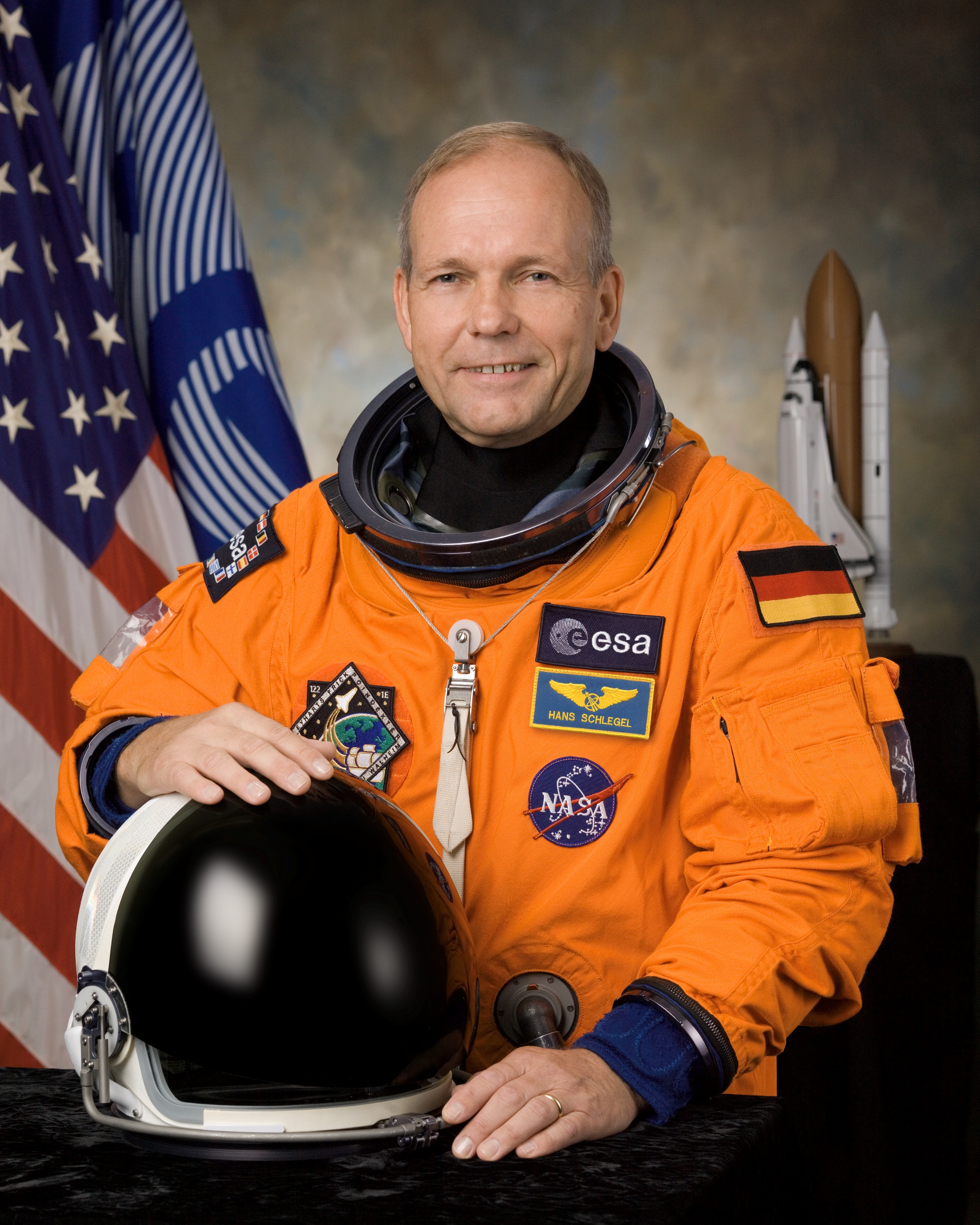
Hans Schlegel, 2007

- Henry Suso (1295–1366), a German Dominican friar, beatified by the Catholic Church in 1831.
- Bonifaz Wohlmut, (DE Wiki) (1510–1579), master builder, worked in Vienna and Prague
- Franz Schoch, (DE Wiki) (1762–1813), district administrator in the Baden civil service
- Karl Joseph Brodtmann (1787–1862) was a Swiss artist, lithographer, printmaker, publisher and bookseller.
- Manfred Pfister, (DE Wiki) (1879–1959), lawyer and district administrator in the Baden civil service
- Siegfried Lauterwasser (1913–2000), photographer
- Julius Viel, (DE Wiki) (1918–2002), a German journalist, author and convicted war criminal.
- Nike Wagner (born 1945), a dramaturge, arts administrator and author; granddaughter of Richard Wagner
- Alexander Lauterwasser (born 1951), photographer
- Hans Schlegel (born 1951), astronaut, veteran of two NASA Space Shuttle missions.
- Stephan Braunfels (born 1950), architect
- Roman Schatz (born 1960), Finnish journalist and author.
- Alexa Kriele (born 1961), writer and medium
- Mark Keller (born 1965), actor
- Marc Dumitru (born 1986), a German actor and singer of Romanian descent.

=== Sport ===
- Michael Steinbach (born 1969), a retired rower, gold medallist at the 1992 Summer Olympics
- Uwe Möhrle (born 1979), a German former footballer who played 476 games
- Richard Ringer (born 1989), long-distance and cross-country runner
- Nicolas Höfler (born 1990), a German footballer who has played over 400 games
- Mike Halder (born 1996), racing driver
- Michelle Halder (born 1999), racing driver

=== Notable residents ===
- Otto Buchinger (1878–1966), physician, founded Buchinger therapeutic fasting, worked and died locally
- Adolf Horion (1888–1977), a German entomologist who specialised in coleoptera, died locally.
- Kurt Badt (1890–1973), art historian, died locally.
- Friedrich Georg Jünger (1898–1977) poet, essayist, Bodensee-Literature winner in 1955, died locally.
- Fred Raymond (1900–1954), Austrian composer, who lived from 1951 in Überlingen, where his tomb is
- Walter Frentz (1907–2004), German cameraman, film producer and photographer; died locally
- Manfred Fuhrmann (1925–2005), a professor for classical Latin philology
- Martin Walser (1927–2023), writer, winner of the Peace Prize of the German Book Trade, died in Nussdorf

== Towns adjacent to Überlingen ==
- Sipplingen
- Uhldingen-Mühlhofen
- Salem
- Owingen
- Bodman-Ludwigshafen

== Literature ==
(all in German)

- Dieter Helmut Stolz: Geliebtes Überlingen. Ein Gang durch Geschichte und Kultur der Stadt am Bodensee. Mit Stadtrundgang. Mit zahlr. Fotos von Siegfried Lauterwasser. 2., überarb. Auflage. Verlag des Südkurier, Konstanz 1981, .
- Paul Baur (Hrsg.): ...klein, hochmodern aber hiesig! Überlinger Gewerbe im Wandel Verein der Freunde der Jörg-Zürn-Gewerbeschule 2. Auflage 1997, ISBN 3-921213-93-2.
- Bettina Bernhard: "Kur am und im See, Alpenblick inklusive". Das Kneippheilbad Überlingen. In: Wolfgang Niess, Sönke Lorenz (Hrsg.): Kult-Bäder und Bäderkultur in Baden-Württemberg. Markstein, Filderstadt 2004, ISBN 3-935129-16-5.
- Michael Brunner, Marion Harder-Merkelbach (Hrsg.): 1100 Jahre Kunst und Architektur in Überlingen (850–1950). Begleitbuch zur Ausstellung der Städtischen Galerie Überlingen. Imhof Verlag, Petersberg 2005, ISBN 3-86568-032-1.
- Oswald Burger: Der Stollen. Überlingen 2005, ISBN 3-86142-087-2 (Dokumentation zum KZ Aufkirch, Goldbacher Stollen, kurzer Abschnitt über KZ-Friedhof Birnau).
- Oswald Burger, Hansjörg Straub: Die Levingers. Eine Familie in Überlingen. Eggingen 2002, ISBN 3-86142-117-8 (geschildert werden nebenbei auch die Überlinger Vereine um 1900 und die Zeit des Großherzogtums bzw. des Staates Baden).
- Jan Fornol et al.: s brennt! Überlingen eine Stadt und ihre Feuerwehr 1853 bis 2003. Eigenverlag, 2003
- Alois Schneider, Regierungspräsidium Stuttgart, Landesamt für Denkmalpflege, Stadt Überlingen (Hrsg.): Archäologischer Stadtkataster Baden-Württemberg Band 34 Überlingen. Regierungspräsidium Stuttgart Landesamt für Denkmalpflege 2008, ISBN 978-3-927714-92-2.
- Peter Höring, Ursula Horstmann und Hermann Keller: Chronik von Andelshofen. Eigenverlag, 2010, 248 Seiten
- Eva-Maria Bast, Heike Thissen: Geheimnisse der Heimat: 50 spannende Geschichten aus Überlingen. Edition SÜDKURIER, 2011, ISBN 978-3-00-035898-2.
- Alfons Semler: Überlingen – Bilder aus der Geschichte einer kleinen Reichsstadt, Oberbadischer Verlag, Singen 1949
