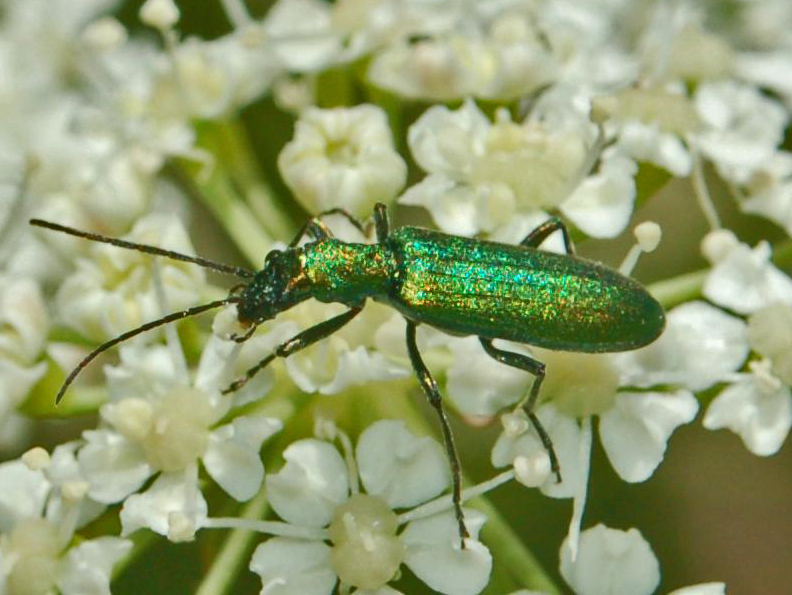
- Chrysanthia viridissima

Scientific classification
- Domain: Eukaryota
- Kingdom: Animalia
- Phylum: Arthropoda
- Class: Insecta
- Order: Coleoptera
- Suborder: Polyphaga
- Infraorder: Cucujiformia
- Family: Oedemeridae
- Genus: Chrysanthia; Schmidt, 1844 or 1846

= Chrysanthia =

Genus of beetles

Chrysanthia is a genus of beetles belonging to the family Oedemeridae, subfamily Nacerdinae. It has a Palearctic distribution.

== Species ==
At least the following eight species are recognized:

- Chrysanthia cyprica Pic, 1920
- Chrysanthia flavipes Reitter, 1889
- Chrysanthia geniculata (W. Schmidt, 1846)
- Chrysanthia hamata Vázquez, 1989
- Chrysanthia reitteri Seidlitz, 1899
- Chrysanthia superba Reitter, 1872
- Chrysanthia varipes Kiesenwetter, 1861
- Chrysanthia viridissima (Linnaeus, 1758)

The BioLib.cz recognizes several more species not recognized by the Global Biodiversity Information Facility.
