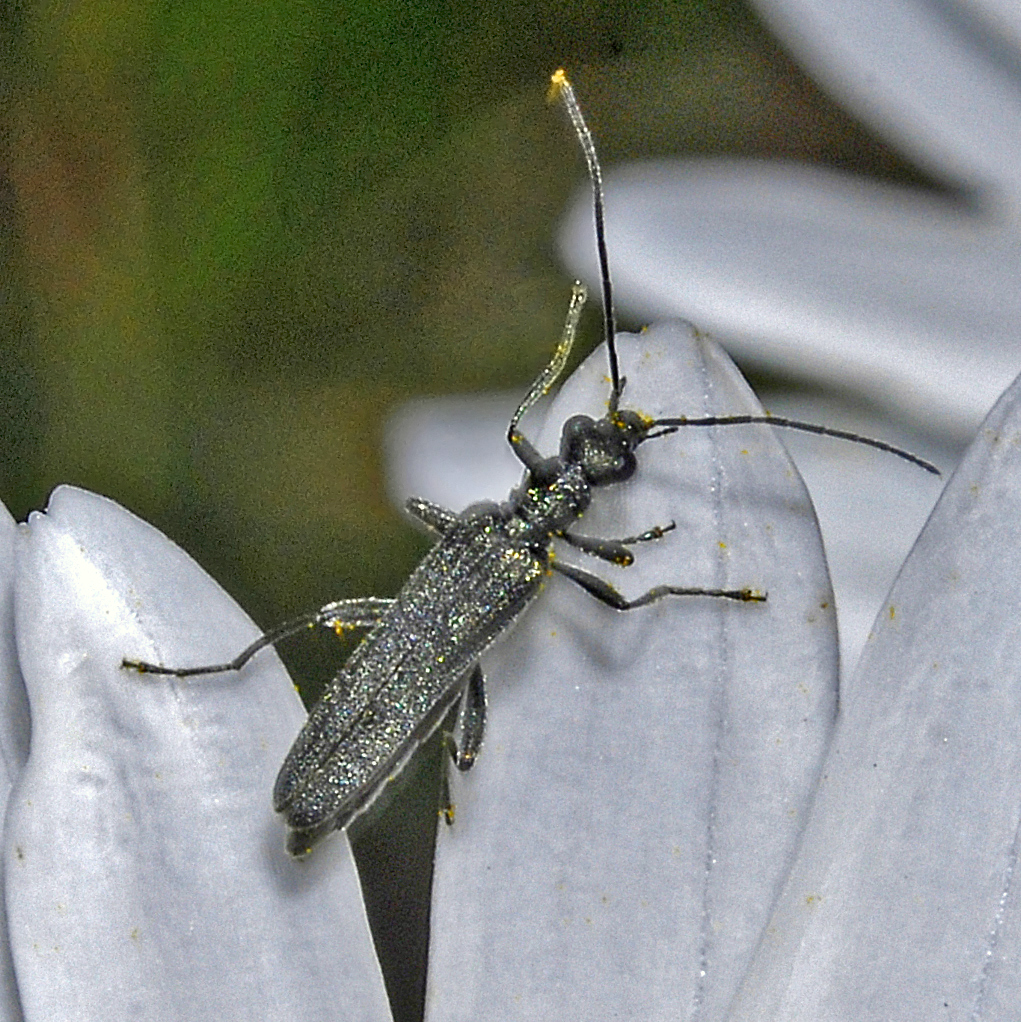
- Oedemera cf. crassipes, female

Scientific classification
- Domain: Eukaryota
- Kingdom: Animalia
- Phylum: Arthropoda
- Class: Insecta
- Order: Coleoptera
- Suborder: Polyphaga
- Infraorder: Cucujiformia
- Family: Oedemeridae
- Genus: Oedemera
- Species: O. crassipes

Binomial name
- Oedemera crassipes Ganglbauer, 1881

Synonyms
- Oedemera (Oedemera) caudata Seidlitz, 1899

= Oedemera crassipes =

Species of beetle

Oedemera crassipes is a species of beetle belonging to the family Oedemeridae subfamily Oedemerinae.

== Distribution ==
These beetles are present in southern Europe in North Africa and in the Near East.

== Description ==
Oedemera crassipes can reach a length of about 7 millimetres (0.28 in). These beetles have parallel (non-dehiscent) elytra that fully cover the abdomen without leaving the hind wings visible. The basic body color is gray-green. Males have slightly enlarged hind femora, but they are scarcely distinguishable from females. The apex of the last sternite is not rounded and the shape of pygidium is much more longer than last sternite.

This species is very similar to Oedemera virescens and Oedemera lurida. They are quite difficult to distinguish one from the other, as the separation relies on subtle characters. These beetles, probably the most primitive of the genus, usually need to be dissected and to examine the genitals under the microscope.
