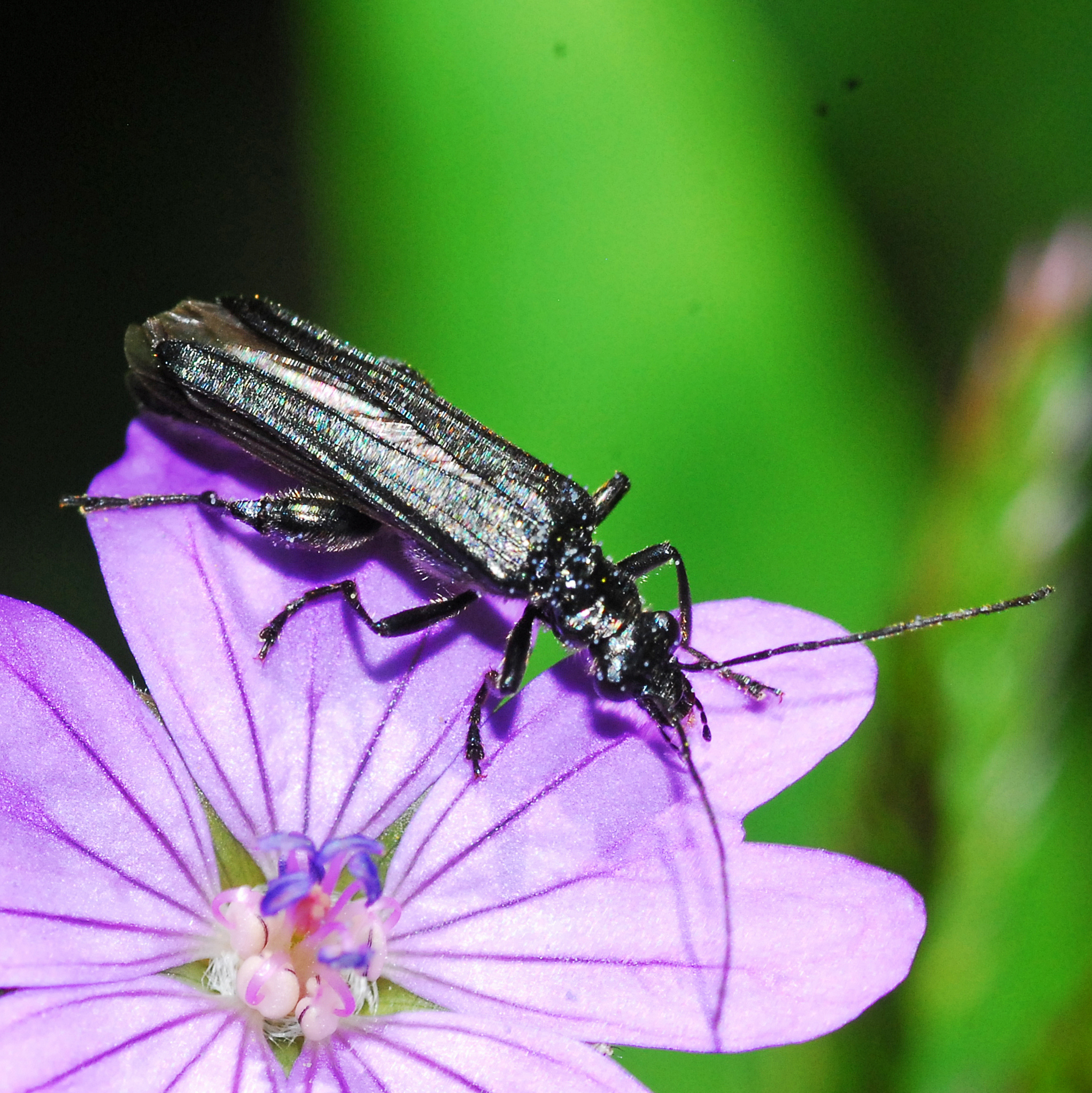
- Male

Scientific classification
- Domain: Eukaryota
- Kingdom: Animalia
- Phylum: Arthropoda
- Class: Insecta
- Order: Coleoptera
- Suborder: Polyphaga
- Infraorder: Cucujiformia
- Family: Oedemeridae
- Genus: Oedemera
- Species: O. tristis

Binomial name
- Oedemera tristis W. Schmidt, 1846

= Oedemera tristis =

Species of beetle

Oedemera tristis is a species of beetle belonging to the family Oedemeridae subfamily Oedemerinae.

== Description ==
Oedemera tristis can reach a body length of about 9–12 mm (0.35–0.47 in). It is an elongated insect with a soft, black body. Males have large, swollen posterior thighs (metafemurs). The elytra are divergent at their ends and reveal the wings.

== Distribution and habitat ==
This species is present in most Europe. This insect lives in meadows and forest edges.
