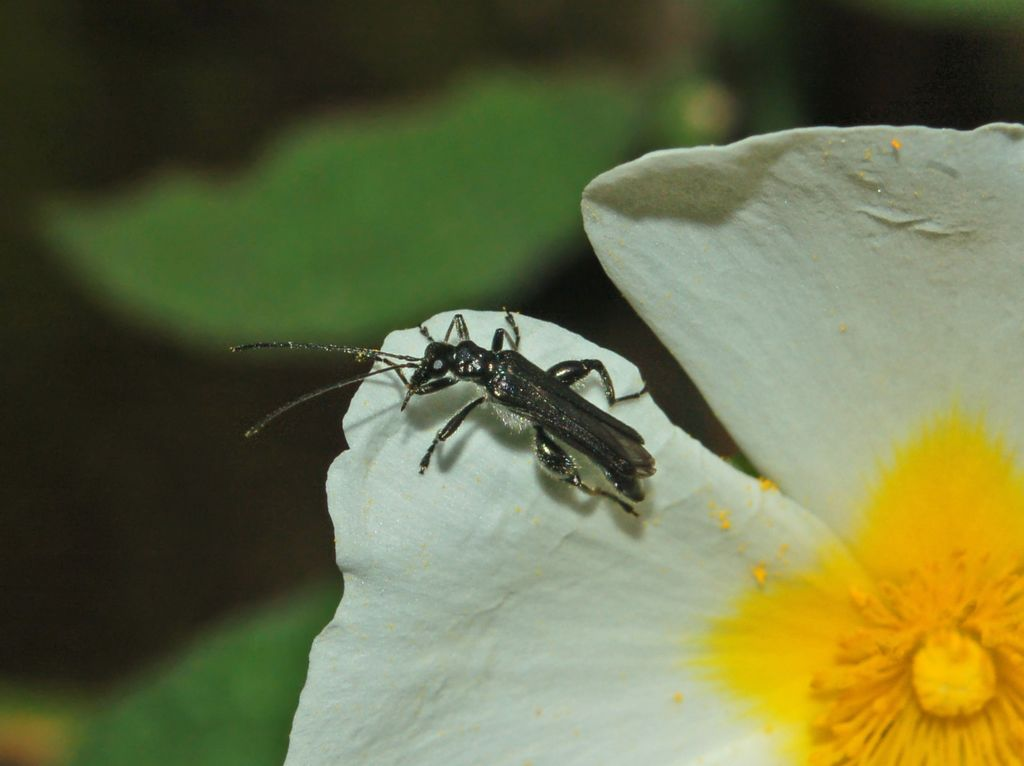
- Male

Scientific classification
- Domain: Eukaryota
- Kingdom: Animalia
- Phylum: Arthropoda
- Class: Insecta
- Order: Coleoptera
- Suborder: Polyphaga
- Infraorder: Cucujiformia
- Family: Oedemeridae
- Genus: Oedemera
- Species: O. atrata

Binomial name
- Oedemera atrata W. Schmidt, 1846

= Oedemera atrata =

Species of beetle

Oedemera atrata is a species of beetle belonging to the family Oedemeridae subfamily Oedemerinae.

These beetles are present in Albania, Croatia, France, Italy, Greece, Spain and in the Near East.

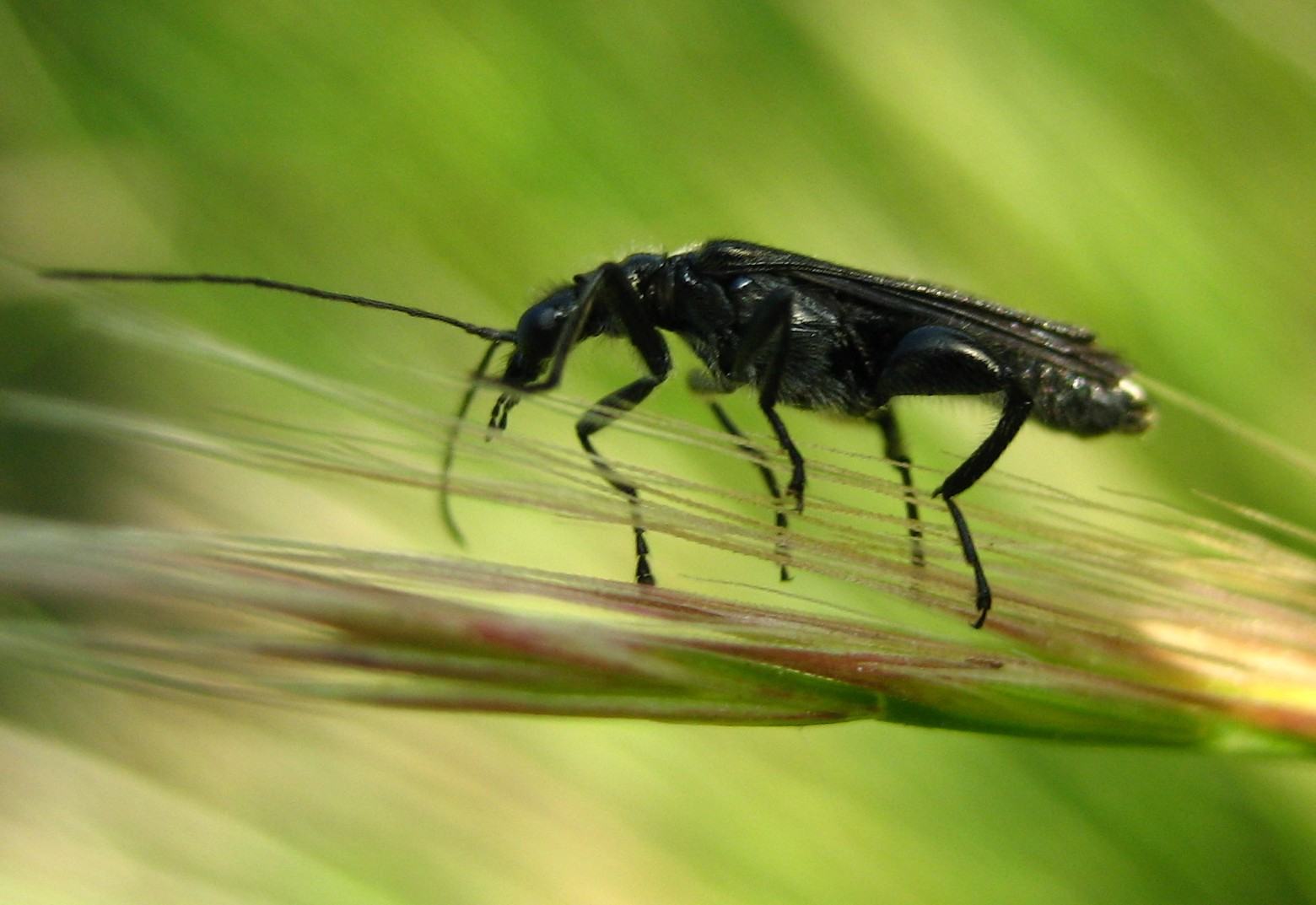
Oedemera atrata – lateral view

They are entirely black or very dark green or dark purple. The adults grow up to 6–9 millimetres (0.24–0.35 in) long and can mostly be encountered from May through July feeding on pollen and nectar.
