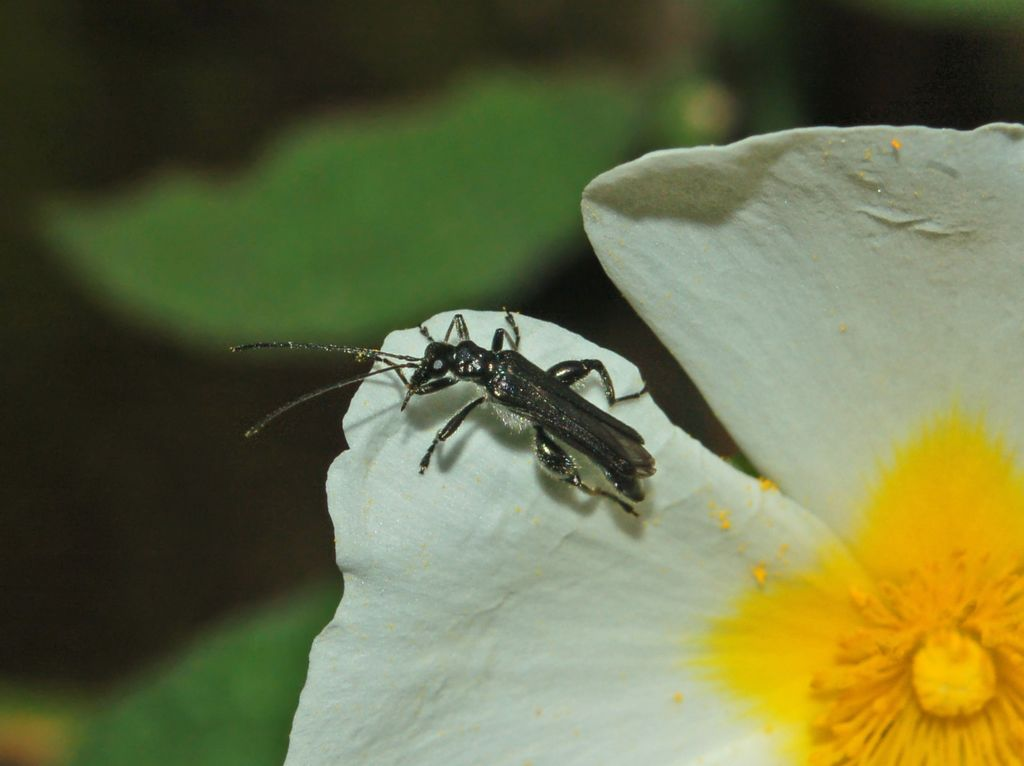
- Oedemera atrata, male

Scientific classification
- Domain: Eukaryota
- Kingdom: Animalia
- Phylum: Arthropoda
- Class: Insecta
- Order: Coleoptera
- Suborder: Polyphaga
- Infraorder: Cucujiformia
- Family: Oedemeridae
- Tribe: Oedemerini
- Genus: Oedemera; Olivier, 1789

Subgenera
- Oncomera Stephens, 1832; Stenaxis Schmidt, 1846; Oedemera s. str.
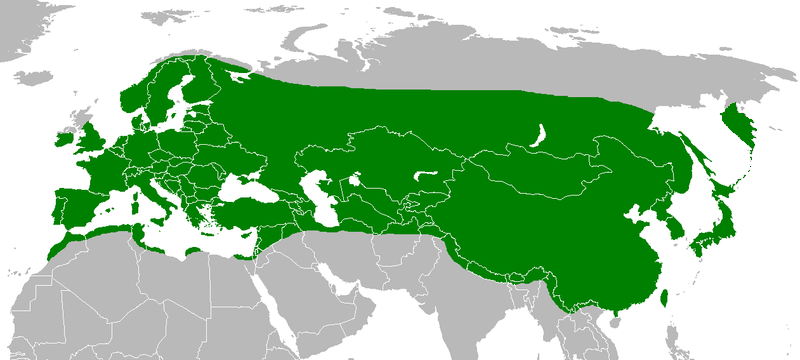

Synonyms
- Aedemera Olivier, 1789 (misspelling); Stenolytra Dillwyn, 1829; Oedemerina A. Costa, 1852; Oedemerastra Seidlitz, 1899; Oedemerella Seidlitz, 1899; Oedemeronia Seidlitz, 1899; Oncomerina Seidlitz, 1899; Oedemra Auctt. (misspelling); Oncomerella Reitter, 1911

= Oedemera =

Genus of beetles

Oedemera is a genus of beetles in the family Oedemeridae, subfamily Oedemerinae.

== Description ==
Species in the genus Oedemera are slender, soft-bodied beetles of medium size, typically ranging from 5 to 20 mm in length. Their coloration can be bright and metallic (such as green, gold, or copper), or combinations of black with yellow or brown.

The mandibles are bifid (split) at the apex, and the last segment of the maxillary palps is narrow and elongated. The antennae are long and threadlike. In most species, the elytra are narrowed towards the rear, exposing part of the hind wings. The pronotum lacks lateral edges and is significantly narrower than the elytra.

The tibiae bear two apical spines, and in most species, the hind femora of males are notably swollen or enlarged.

== Biology and ecology ==
Species of the genus Oedemera feed on pollen and nectar. Their bodies are covered in dense pubescence, which traps pollen grains and contributes to the pollination of the plants they visit.

Species in the subgenus Oncomera are crepuscular or nocturnal, flying at dusk and during the night. They visit the flowers and inflorescences of aromatic shrubs and various plants, including Clematis, Crataegus, Tilia, and Quercus.

In contrast, species belonging to the subgenera Stenaxis and Oedemera sensu stricto are diurnal. They are active in full sunlight during the middle of the day and visit flowers from a variety of plant families, such as Asteraceae, Cistaceae, and Apiaceae.

== Distribution ==
This genus includes approximately eighty species, distributed from the Iberian Peninsula and North Africa to Kamchatka, the Kuril Islands, Japan, and Taiwan, with some species also found in the northeastern region of Asia.

== List of species ==
Subgenus Oedemera s. str.

- O. (O.) afghana
- O. (O.) algerica
- O. (O.) annulata
- O. (O.) atrata
- O. (O.) barbara
- O. (O.) basalis
- O. (O.) basipes
- O. (O.) brevipennis
- O. (O.) crassipes
- O. (O.) cretica
- O. (O.) croceicollis
- O. (O.) femorata
- O. (O.) flavipennis
- O. (O.) flavipes
- O. (O.) graeca
- O. (O.) hispanica
- O. (O.) inapicalis
- O. (O.) lateralis
- O. (O.) lurida
- O. (O.) melanopyga
- O. (O.) monticola
- O. (O.) nobilis
- O. (O.) penicillata
- O. (O.) podagrariae
- O. (O.) pthysica
- O. (O.) rostralis
- O. (O.) rufofemorata
- O. (O.) schrammi
- O. (O.) simplex
- O. (O.) subrobusta
- O. (O.) testaceithorax
- O. (O.) tristis
- O. (O.) unicolor
- O. (O.) virescens

Subgenus Stenaxis

- O. (S.) amurensis
- O. (S.) annulata

Subgenus Oncomera

- O. (O.) femoralis
- O. (O.) flavicans
- O. (O.) marmorata
- O. (O.) murinipennis
- O. (O.) natolica
- O. (O.) reitteri

== Gallery ==
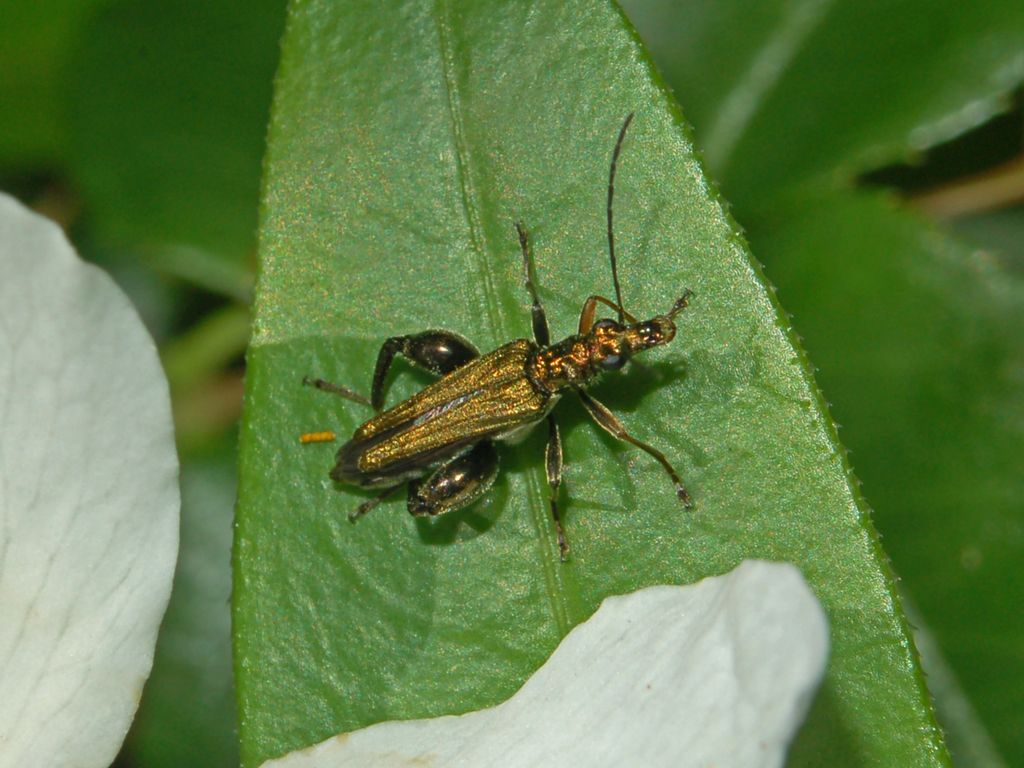
Oedemera flavipes

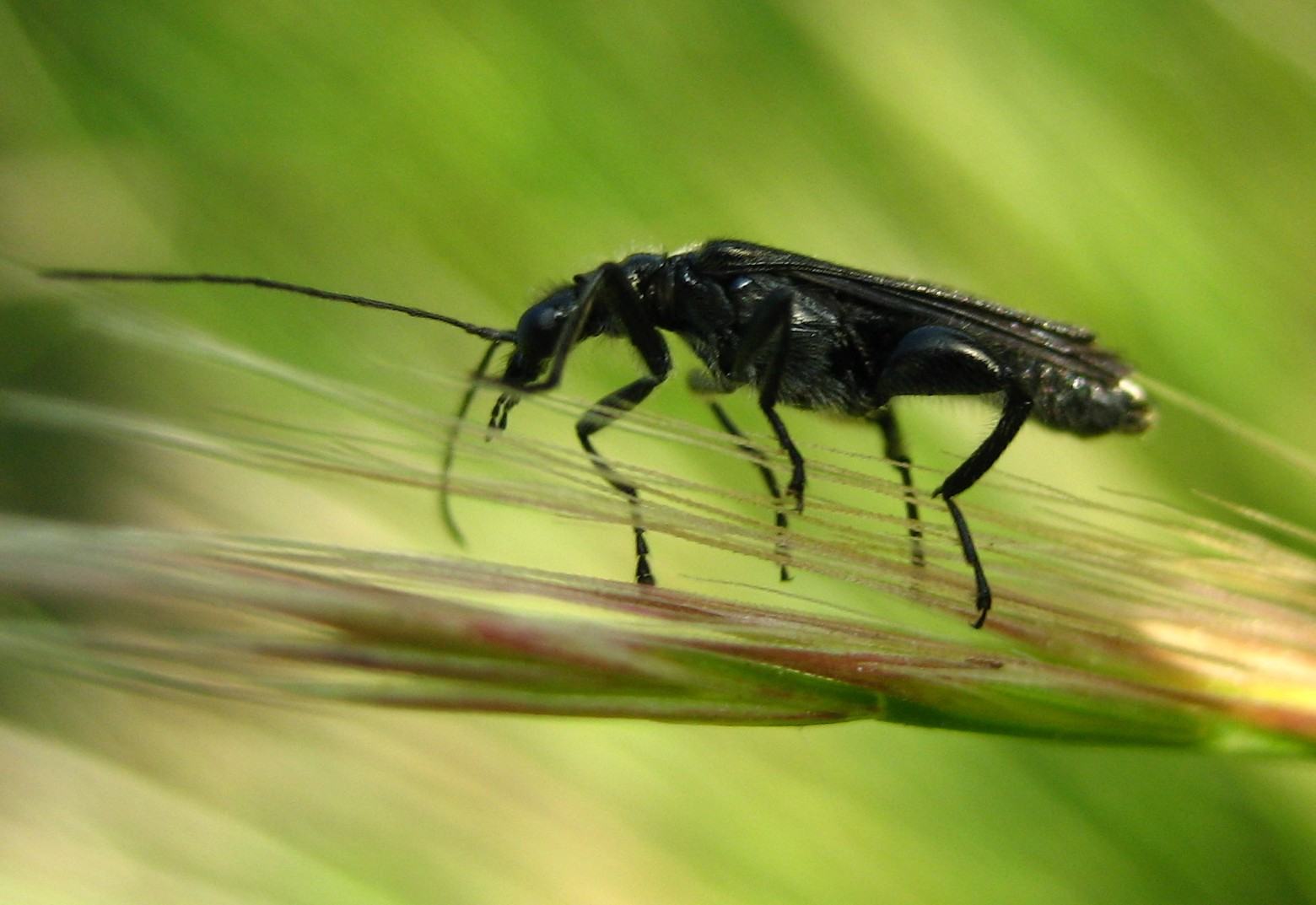
Oedemera atrata

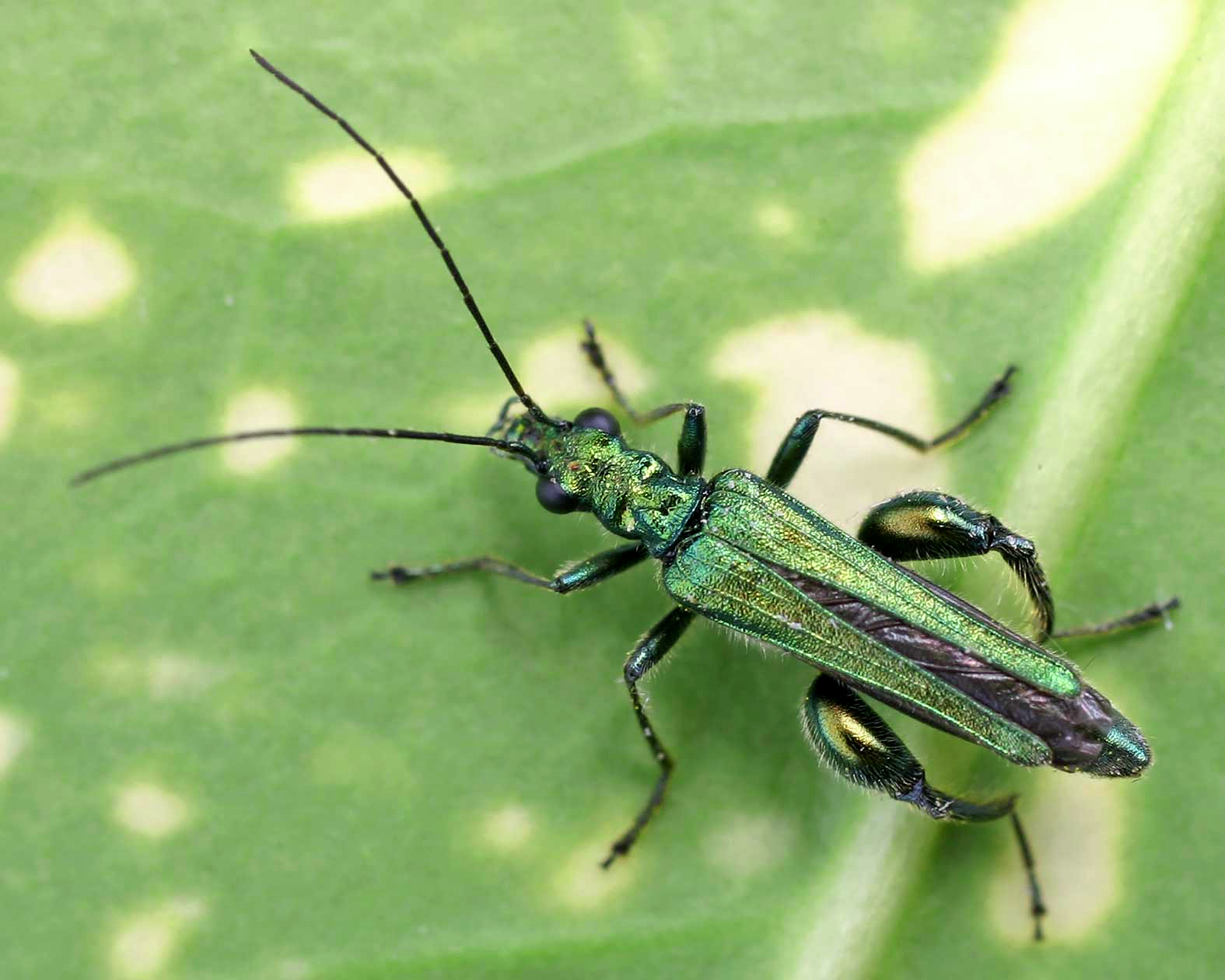
Oedemera nobilis

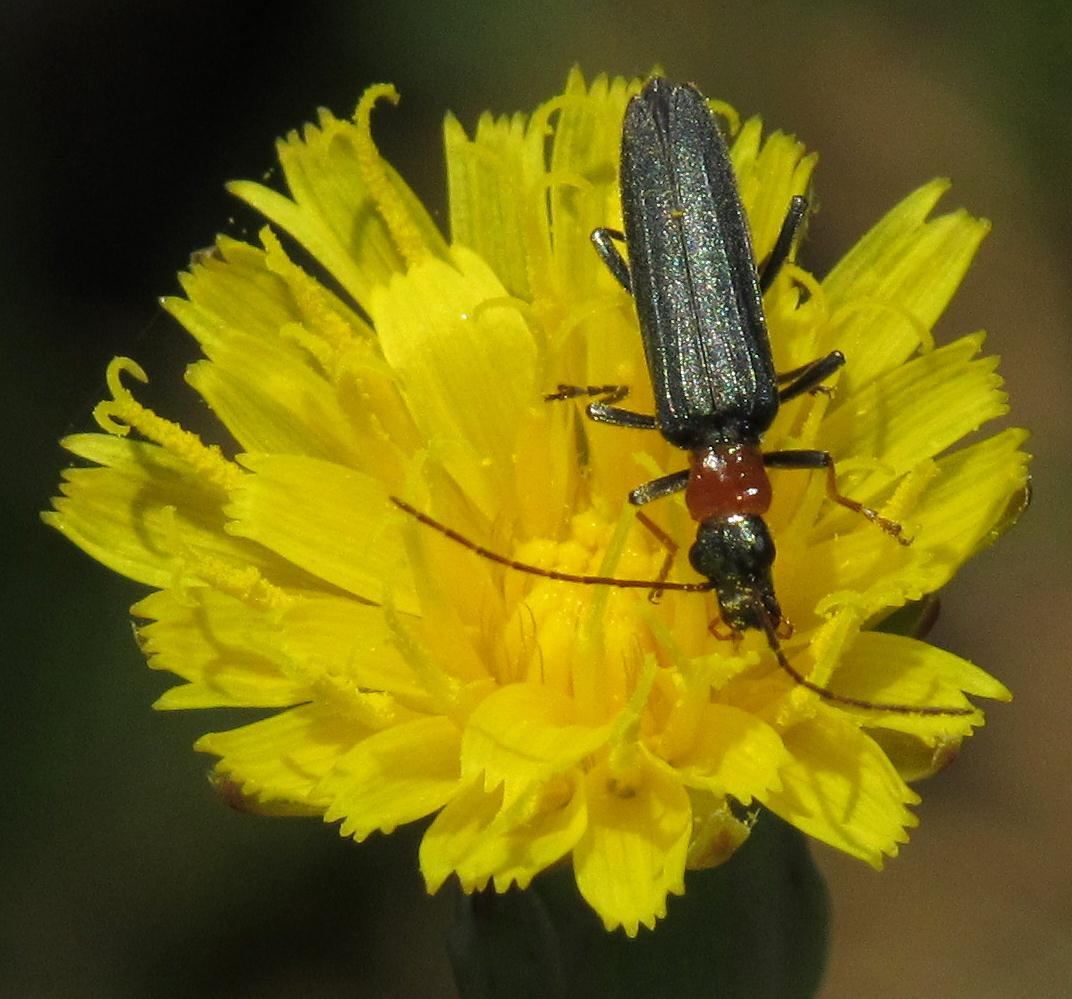
Oedemera croceicollis

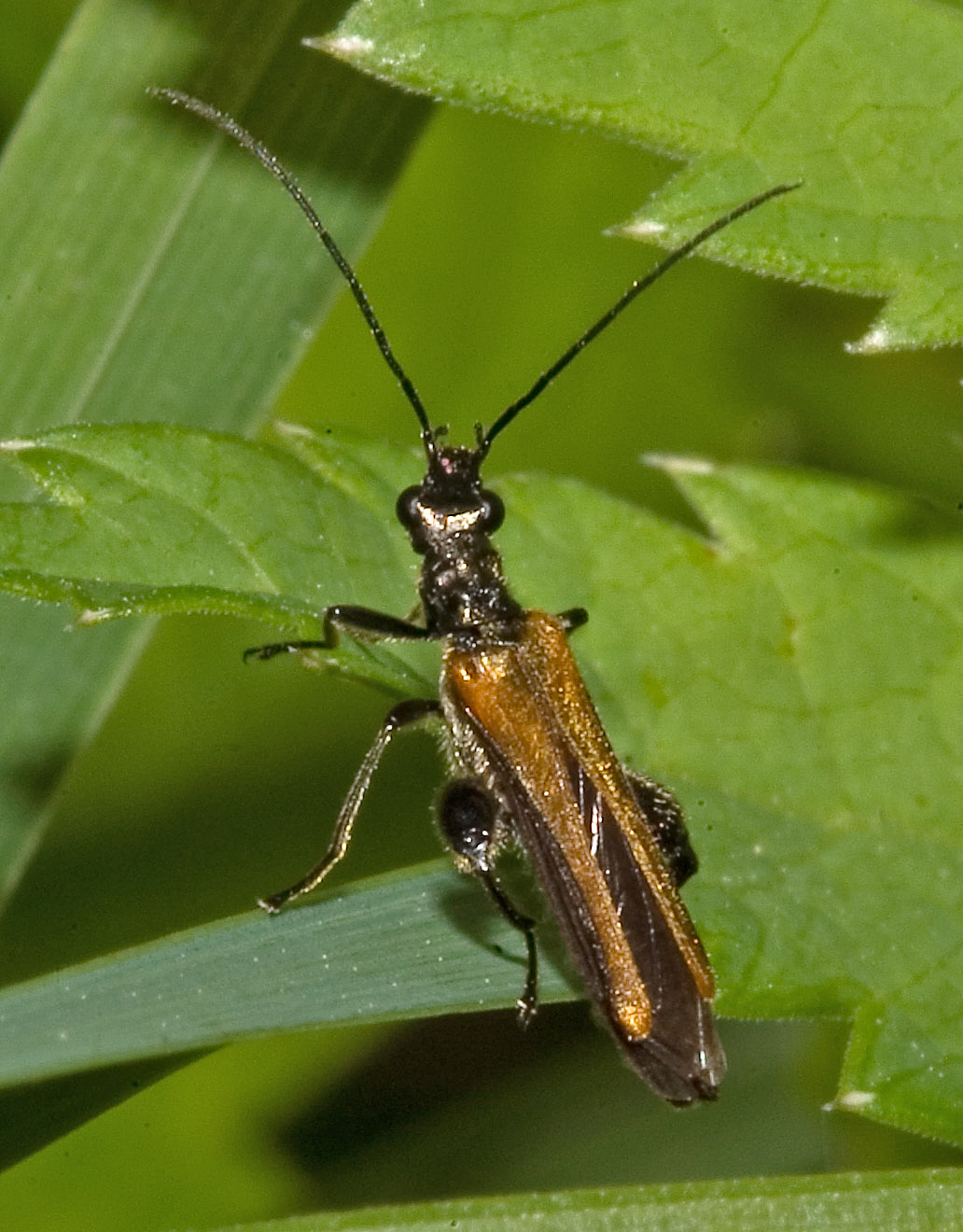
Oedemera femorata
