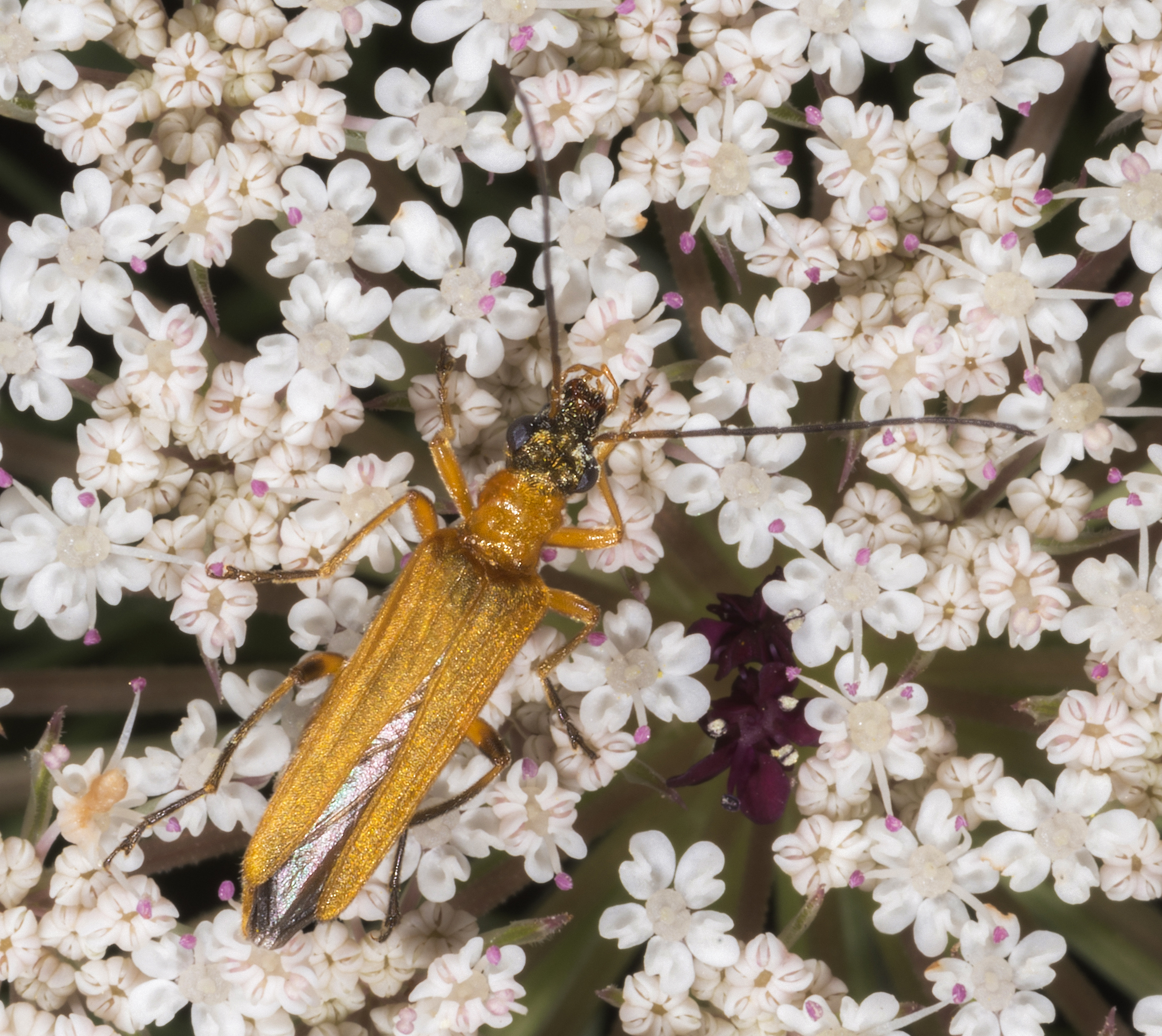
- Oedemera podagrariae – female

Scientific classification
- Kingdom: Animalia
- Phylum: Arthropoda
- Clade: Pancrustacea
- Class: Insecta
- Order: Coleoptera
- Suborder: Polyphaga
- Infraorder: Cucujiformia
- Family: Oedemeridae
- Genus: Oedemera
- Species: O. podagrariae

Binomial name
- Oedemera podagrariae (Linnaeus, 1767)

= Oedemera podagrariae =

Species of beetle

Oedemera podagrariae, common name false blister beetle, is a quite common species of beetles belonging to the family Oedemeridae subfamily Oedemerinae.

== Description ==
The adults grow up to 7–12 millimetres (0.28–0.47 in) long and can mostly be encountered from April through August feeding on pollen and nectar. The head is black. Thorax is black in the male and yellow in the female. Elytra are yellow, ochre-coloured or light brown, sometimes with darker sides. Legs are entirely or at least partially yellow. The male of Oedemera podagrariae, as in most Oedemera species, possesses the hind femora very swollen, whereas in female the femora are thin.

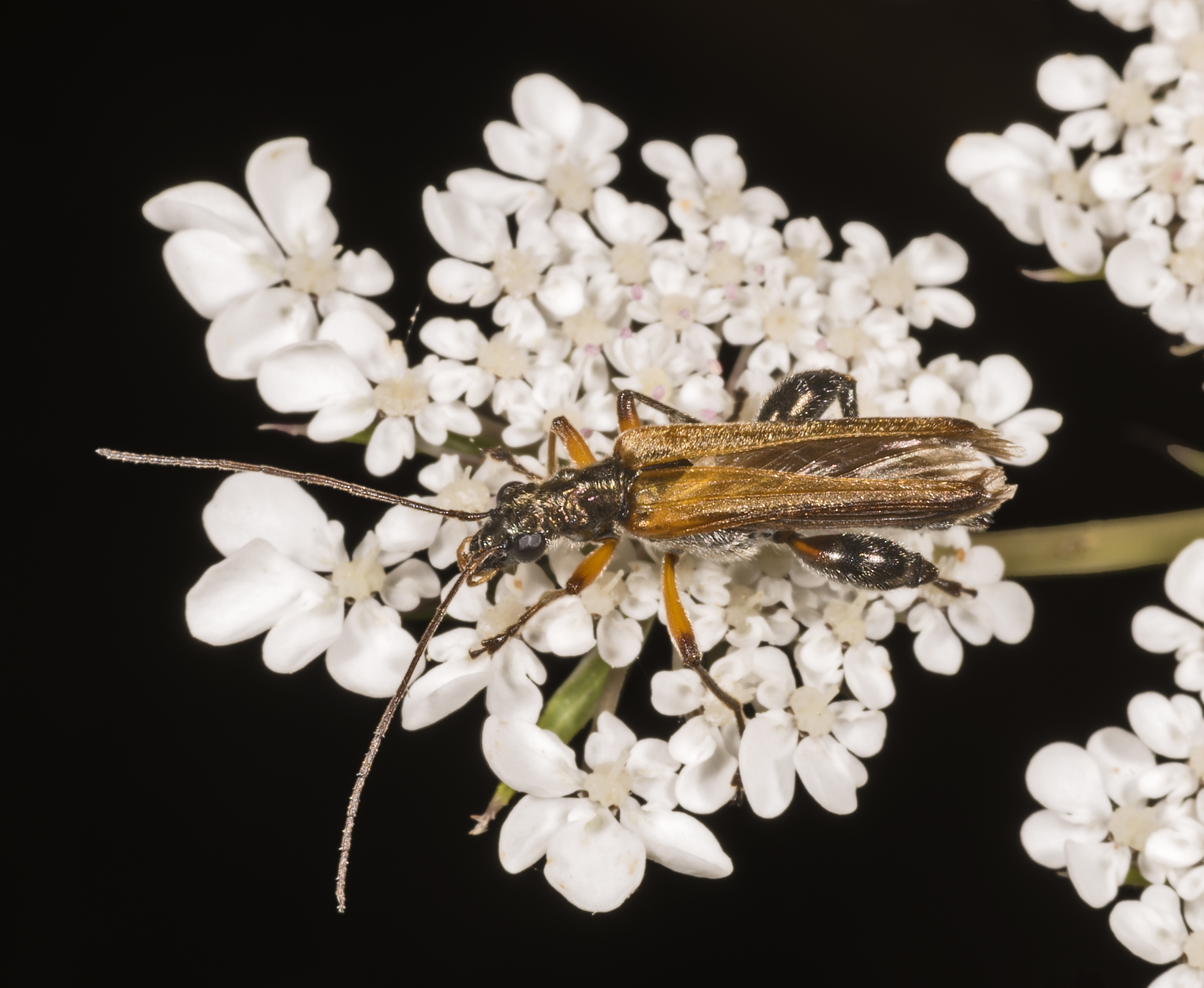
Male

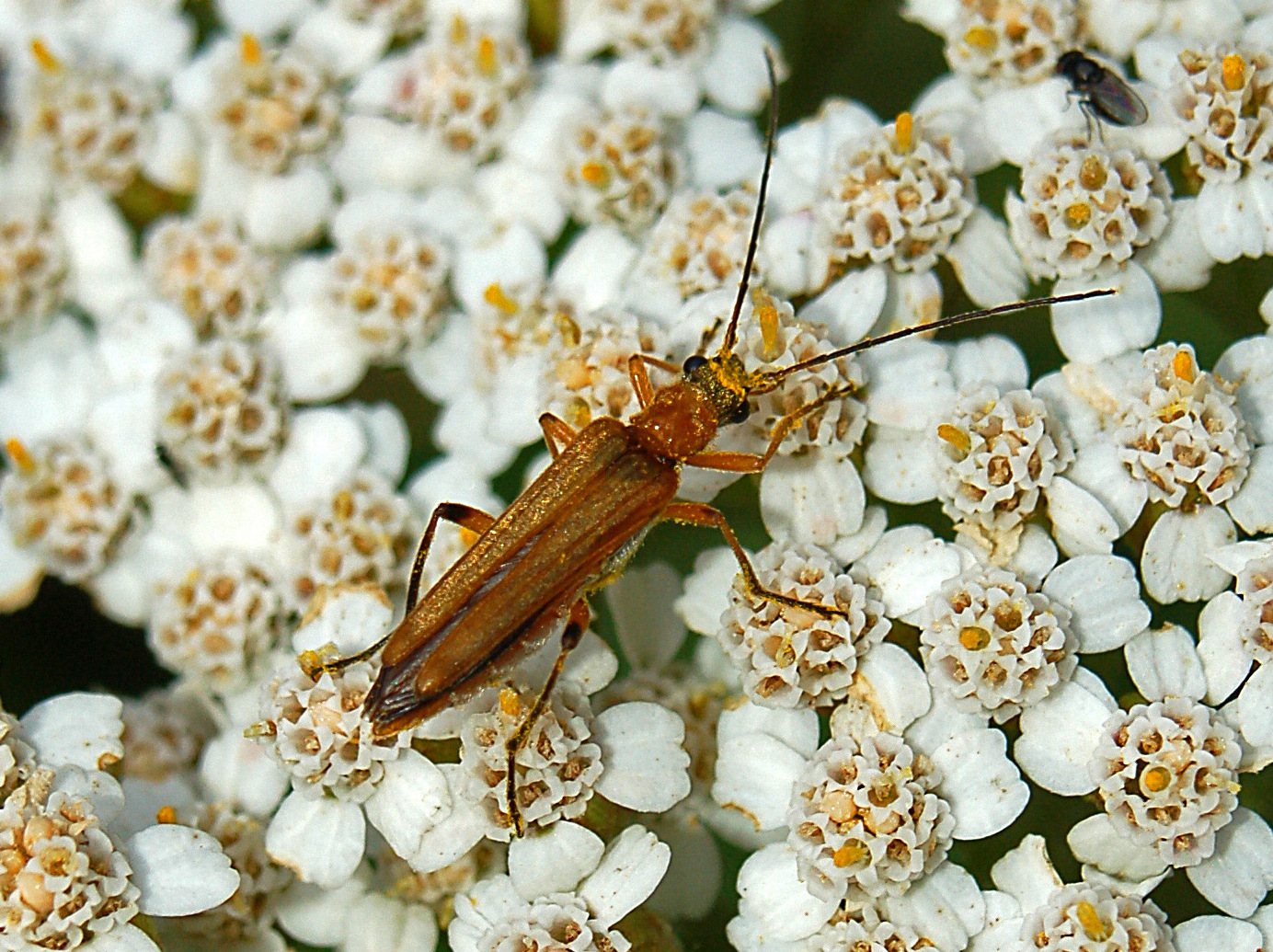
Female

Mating on Viburnum tinus

== Distribution ==
These beetles are present in most of Europe and in the Near East.

== Subspecies and varietas ==
- Oedemera podagrariae podagrariae (Linnaeus, 1767)
- Oedemera podagrariae var. femoralis Seidl.
- Oedemera podagrariae var. flavicrus Saidl.
- Oedemera podagrariae var. obscura Ganglbauer
- Oedemera podagrariae var. schmidti Gemminger
- Oedemera podagrariae var. sericans Mulsant
