= Chrysanthia superba =

Scientific classification
- Kingdom: Animalia
- Phylum: Arthropoda
- Class: Insecta
- Order: Coleoptera
- Suborder: Polyphaga
- Infraorder: Cucujiformia
- Family: Oedemeridae
- Genus: Chrysanthia
- Species: C. superba

Binomial name
- Chrysanthia superba Reitter, 1872

Species of beetle

Chrysanthia superba is a species of false blister beetles belonging to the family Oedemeridae.

== Distribution ==
These beetles are present in Spain, Portugal and North Africa.

== Description ==
Chrysanthia superba can grow up to 6–9 millimetres (0.24–0.35 in) long. These beetles have a rather elongated bodies. Also the head is elongated, with strongly protruding eyes. Antennae are long and thread-like. Pronotum is elongated and heart-shaped. The front edge of the pronotum shows a deep groove. Elytra are densely punctured and have four longitudinal ribs. The legs and antennae are dark. Adults have metallic green elytra and a metallic orange pronotum.
