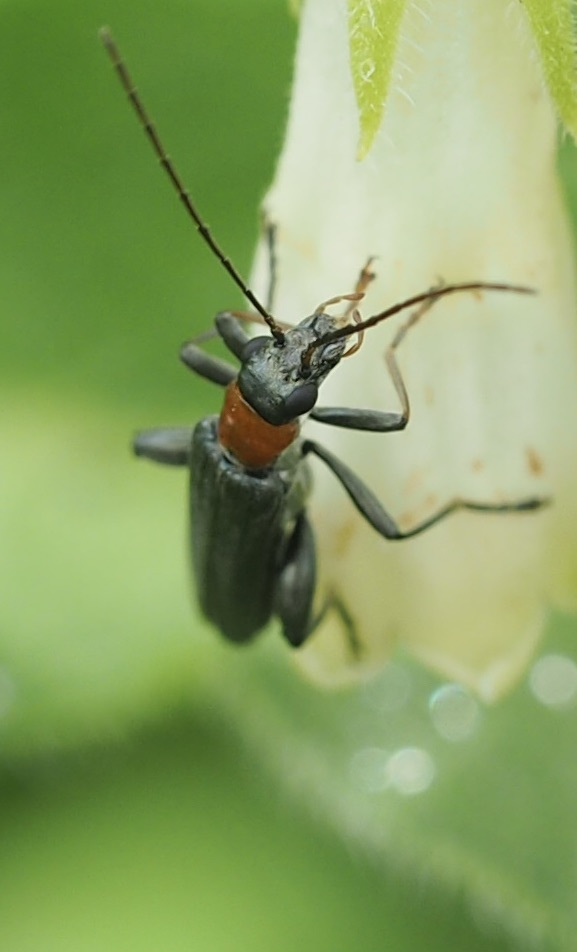

Scientific classification
- Kingdom: Animalia
- Phylum: Arthropoda
- Class: Insecta
- Order: Coleoptera
- Suborder: Polyphaga
- Infraorder: Cucujiformia
- Family: Oedemeridae
- Genus: Oedemera
- Species: O. croceicollis

Binomial name
- Oedemera croceicollis (Gyllenhal, 1827)

= Oedemera croceicollis =

Species of beetle

Oedemera croceicollis is a species from the genus Oedemera. The species was originally described by Leonard Gyllenhaal in 1827.
