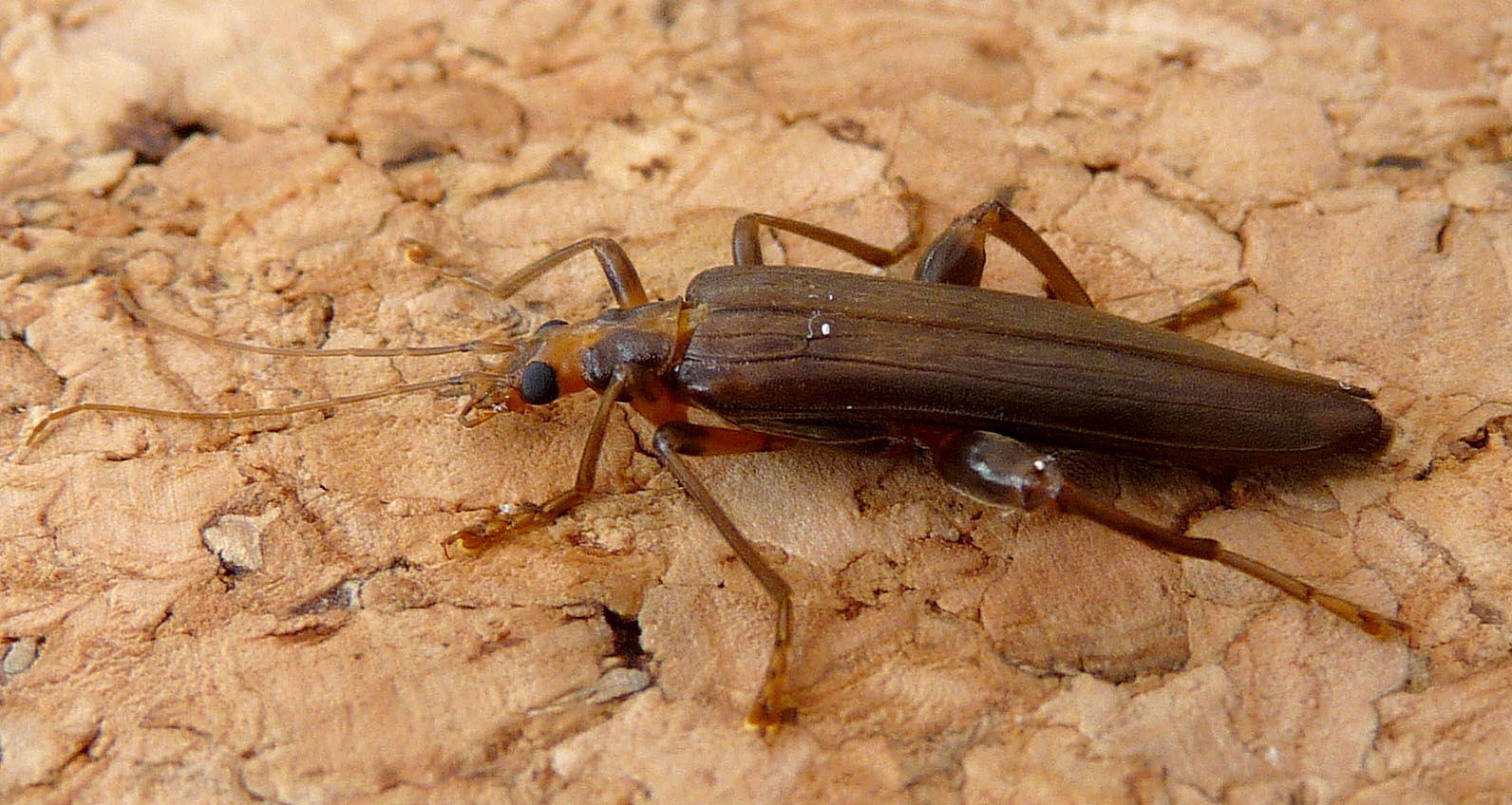

Scientific classification
- Domain: Eukaryota
- Kingdom: Animalia
- Phylum: Arthropoda
- Class: Insecta
- Order: Coleoptera
- Suborder: Polyphaga
- Infraorder: Cucujiformia
- Family: Oedemeridae
- Genus: Oedemera
- Species: O. femoralis

Binomial name
- Oedemera femoralis Olivier, 1803

= Oedemera femoralis =

Species of insect

Oedemera femoralis is a species of false blister beetle in the genus Oedemera.

== Description ==
It is large and pale brown. It typically grows to between 13 and 20mm in length, making it the largest species in its genus.

== Range ==
It is found exclusively in Europe, particularly in the Western Alps, the Pyrenees and around the Severn Estuary.

== Habitat ==
Oedemera femoralis can be found on ivy blossom and willow trees, on which they feed, between April and September.

== Taxonomy ==
Oedemera femoralis contains the following varieties:

- Oedemera femoralis purpureocoerulea
- Oedemera femoralis femoralis
