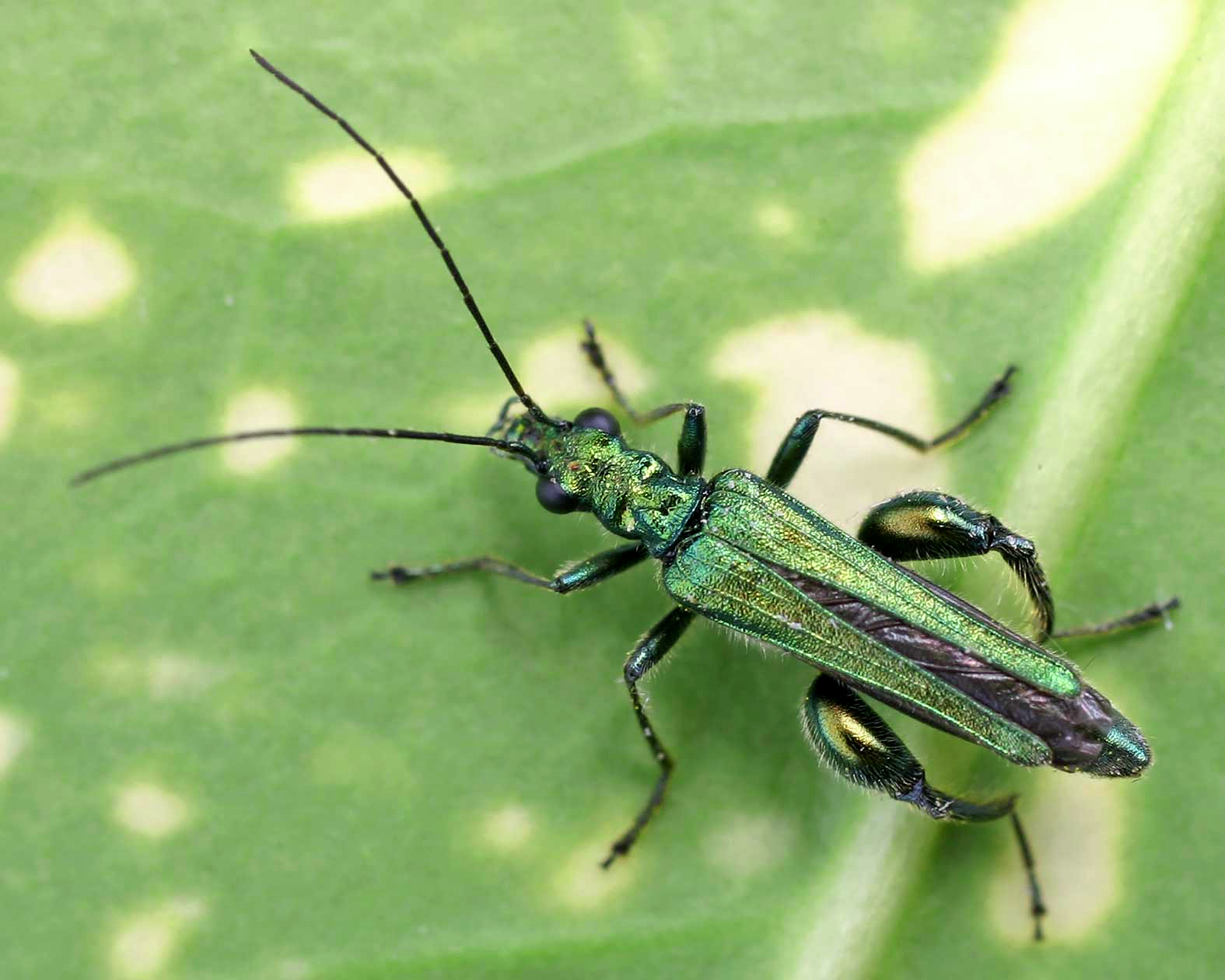
- Male
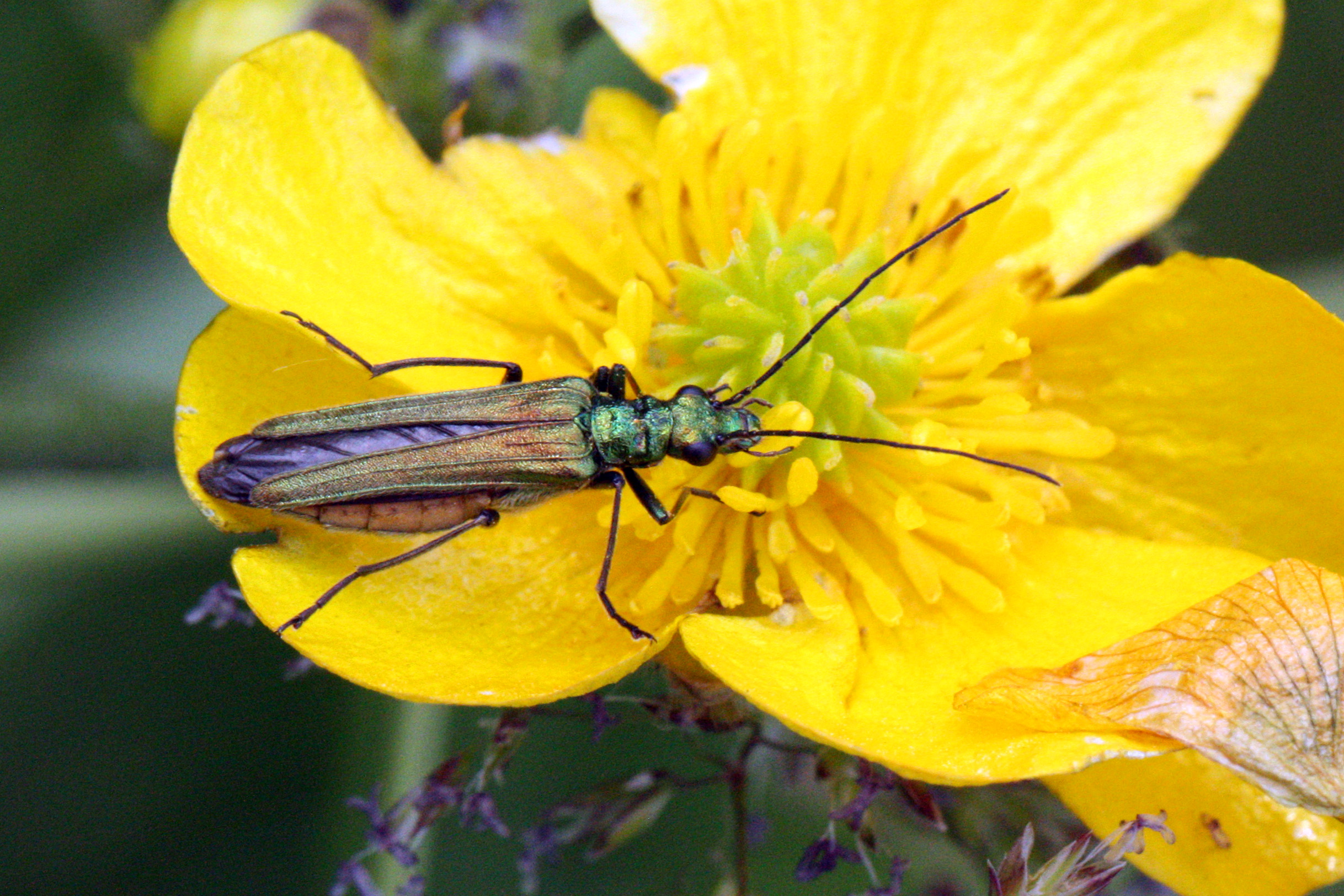
- Female

Scientific classification
- Kingdom: Animalia
- Phylum: Arthropoda
- Clade: Pancrustacea
- Class: Insecta
- Order: Coleoptera
- Suborder: Polyphaga
- Infraorder: Cucujiformia
- Family: Oedemeridae
- Genus: Oedemera
- Species: O. nobilis

Binomial name
- Oedemera nobilis (Scopoli, 1763)
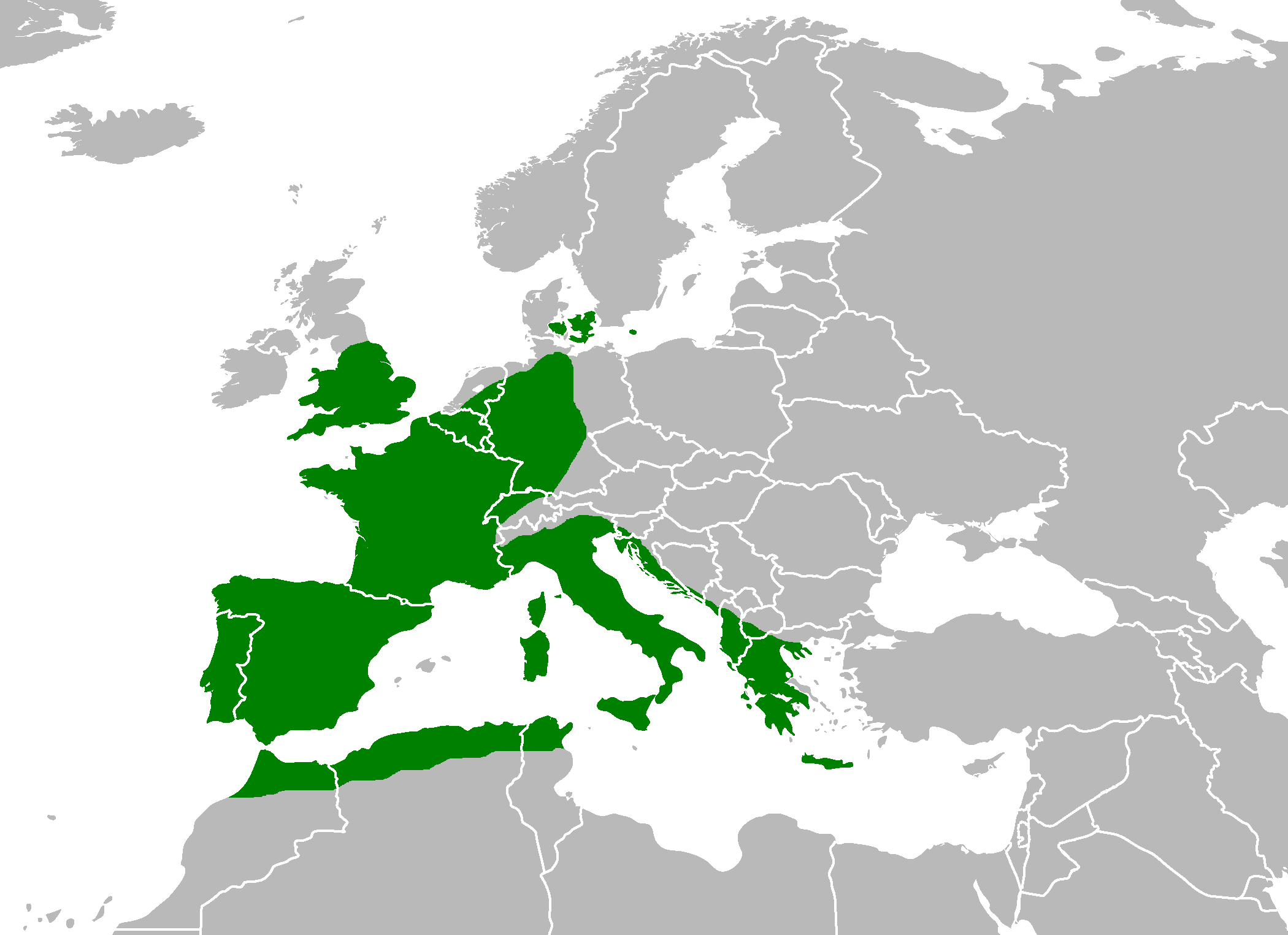

= Oedemera nobilis =

Species of beetle

Oedemera nobilis female

Oedemera nobilis, also known as the false oil beetle, thick-legged flower beetle or swollen-thighed beetle, is a beetle in the family Oedemeridae, a common species in Western Europe, including south and central England.

== Morphology ==
The male of Oedemera nobilis, as in most Oedemera species, possesses hind femora that are very swollen, whereas in the female the femora are thin; the elytra are strongly narrowed towards the apexes, not hiding the membranous hind wings. It is bright green, frequently with a golden or coppery shine; some individuals are blue or violaceous. It can only be confused with Oedemera flavipes (which does not live in the British Isles), from which it differs by its colour, as well as by the long white pubescence on the head, pronotum and hind tibiae of males.

== Biology and ecology ==
Oedemera nobilis is abundant in spring on several flower species; the males are very conspicuous by their swollen femora and bright green colour. It feeds on pollen and nectar of Asteraceae, Cyperaceae, Convolvulaceae, Cruciferae, Dipsacaceae, Scrophulariaceae, Poaceae, Papaveraceae, Plantaginaceae, Rosaceae, Rubiaceae and Apiaceae. The larvae develop on dry stems of Spartium and Cirsium.

== Distribution ==
Western and southern Europe, from the Iberian Peninsula to Greece; it is common in Mediterranean countries and occurs in Central Europe from the western part of Germany through to Great Britain; in Denmark it is rare and sporadic. It is also recorded from the Maghreb. It is absent from alpine countries and Eastern Europe.

In England and Wales, it is presently in a markedly expansive and consolidational phase, which commenced during 1995.

== Gallery ==
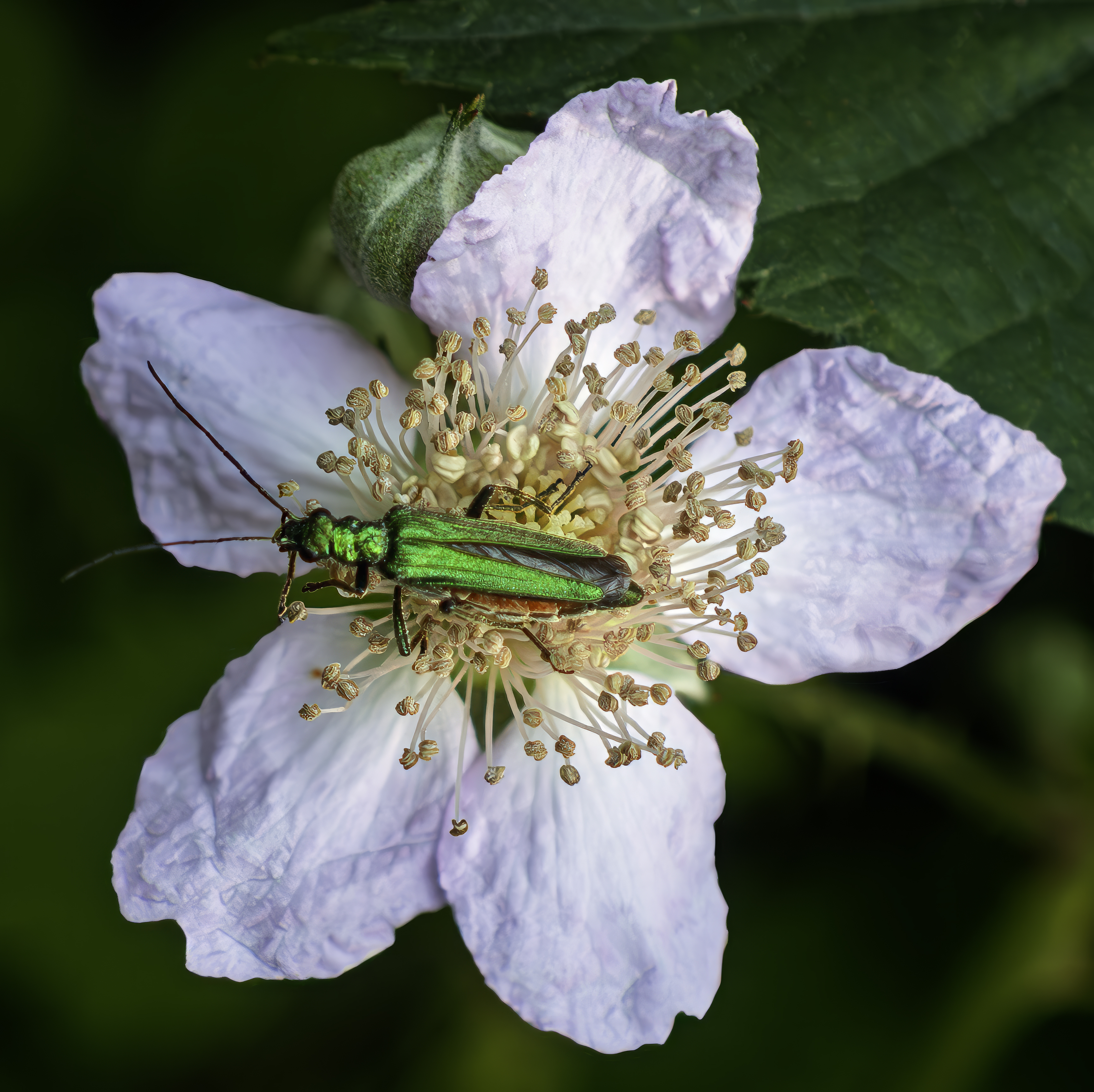
Female of Oedemera nobilis on a Rubus ulmifolius

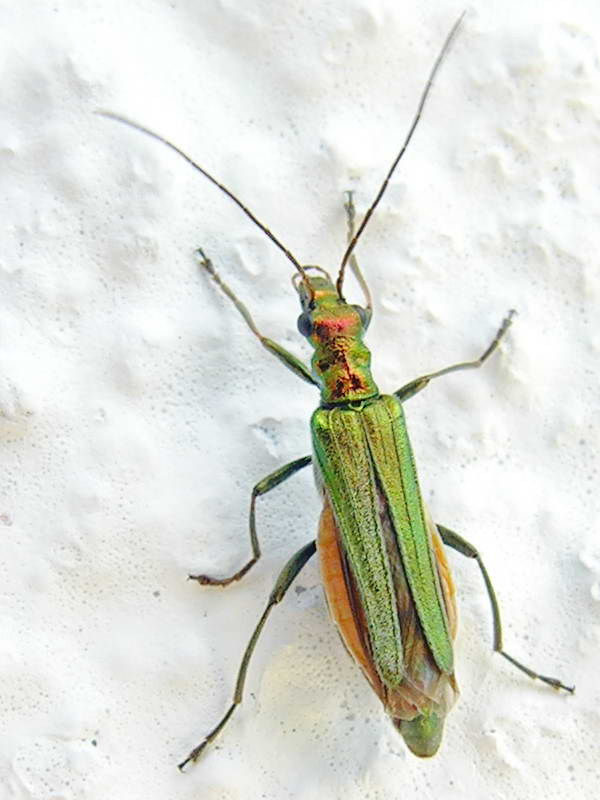
Female of Oedemera nobilis with thin femora

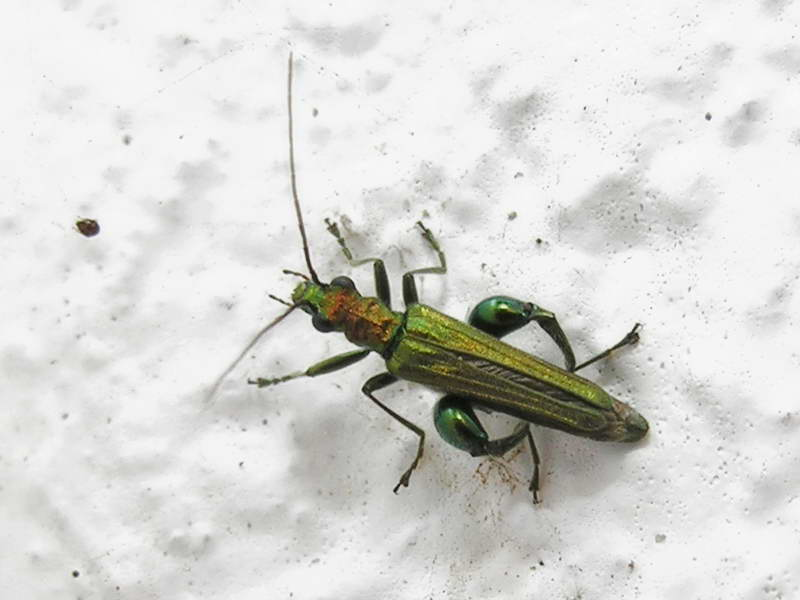
Male of Oedemera nobilis with coppery shine on the head and pronotum

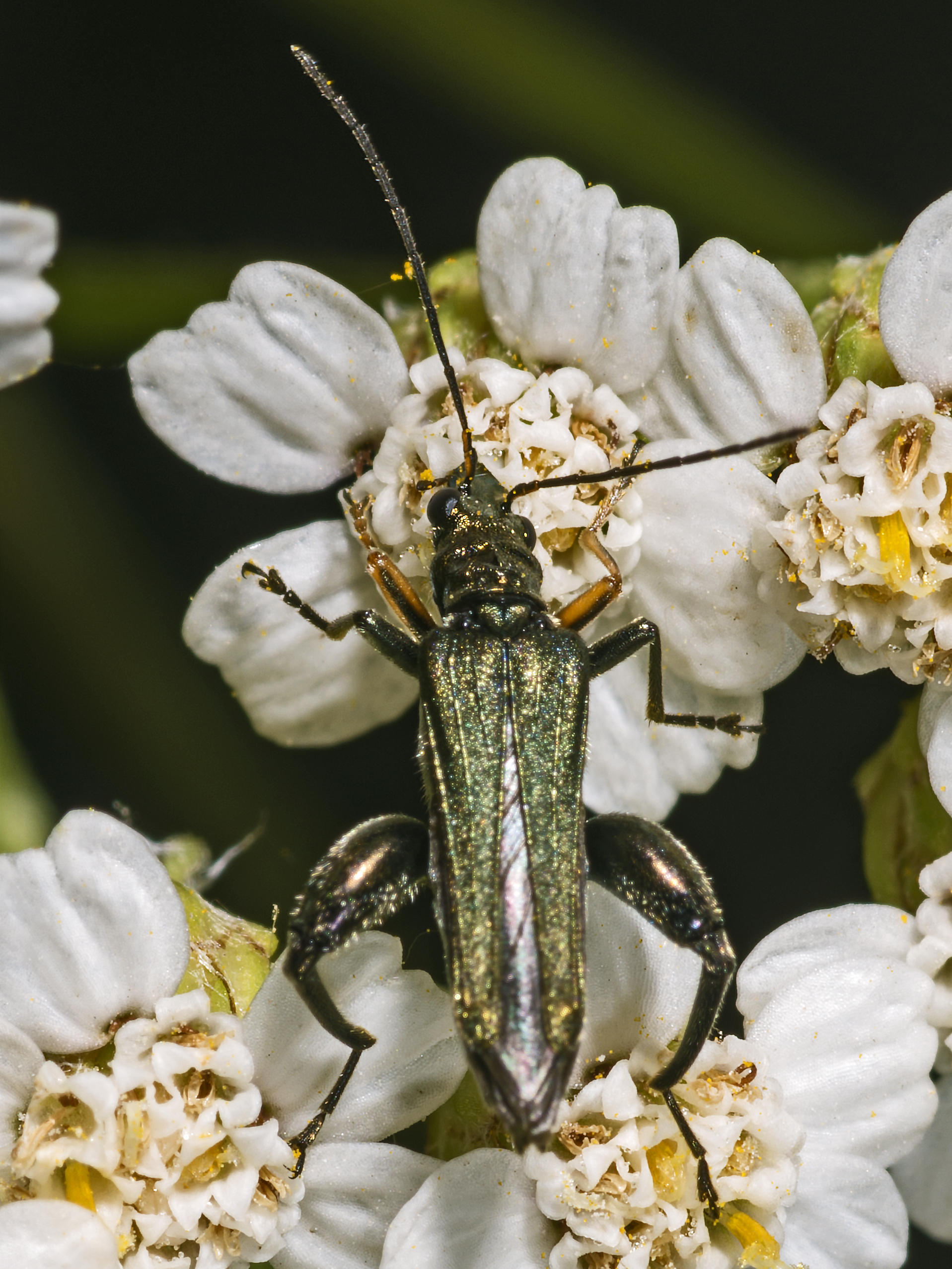
Male of Oedemera flavipes, always darker in colour than Oedemera nobilis

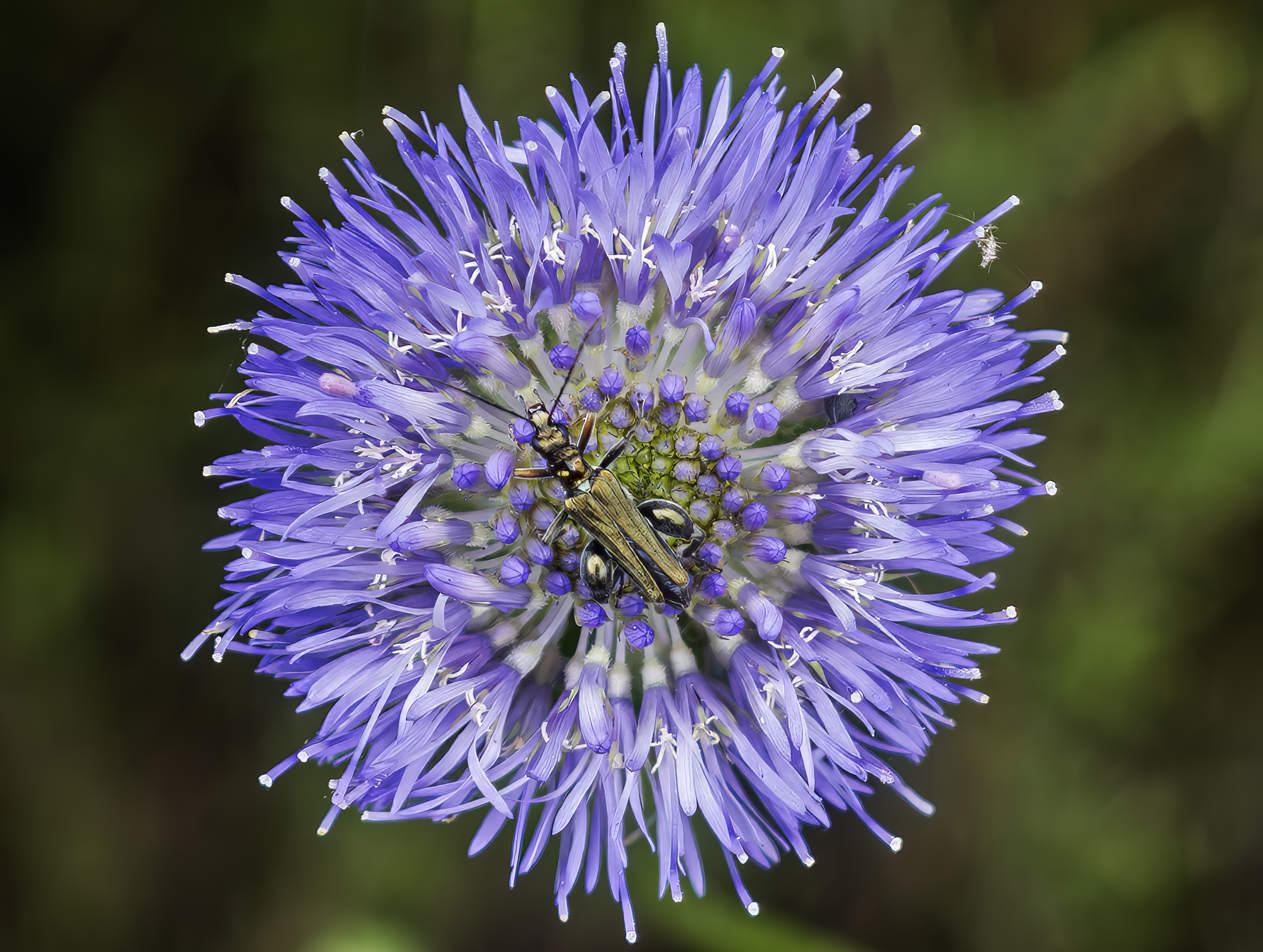
Male on Jasione montana

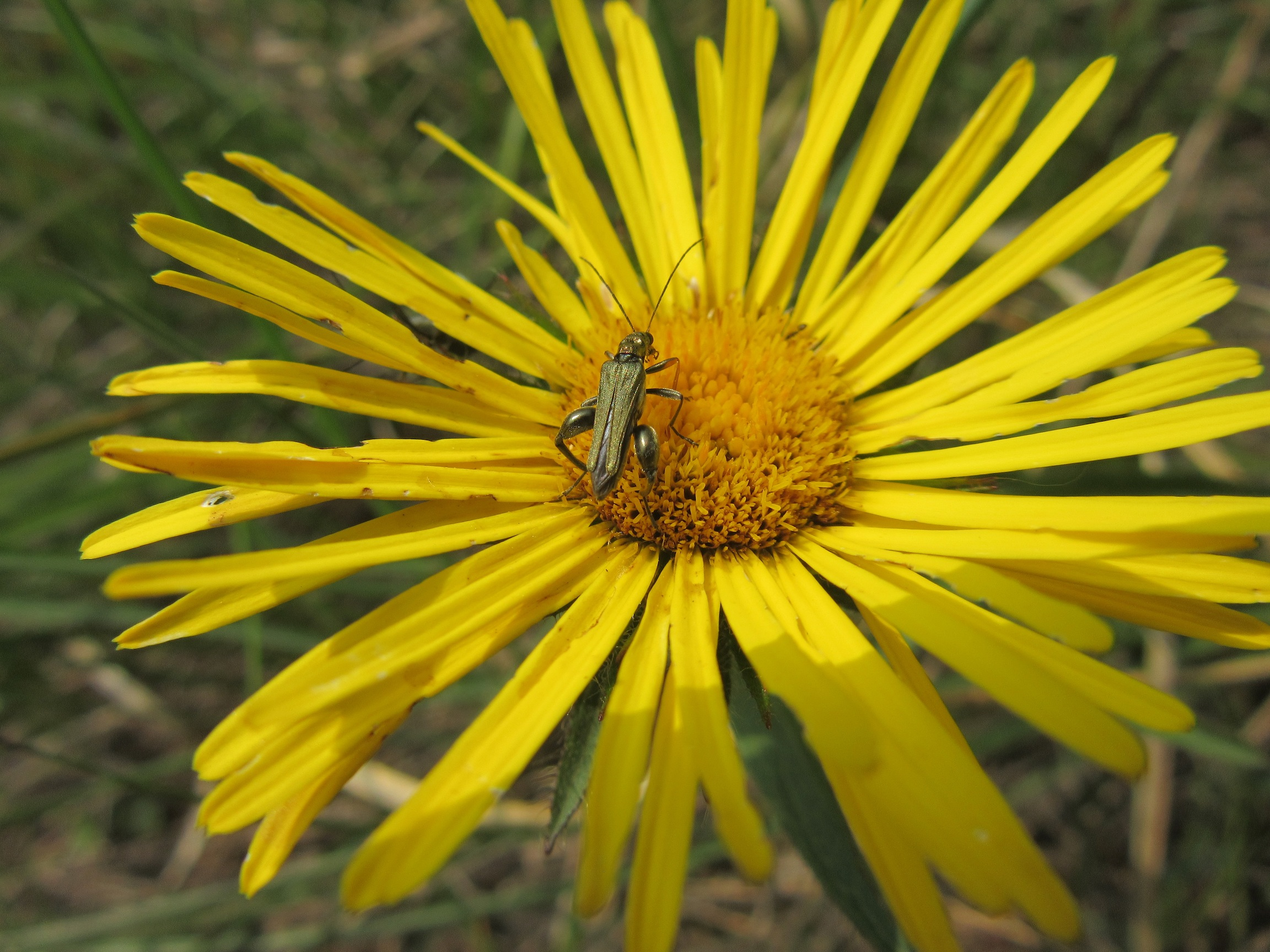
Coleoptera (Oedemera nobilis), male (Monte Calvo, Val della Torre, near Turin, Italy)

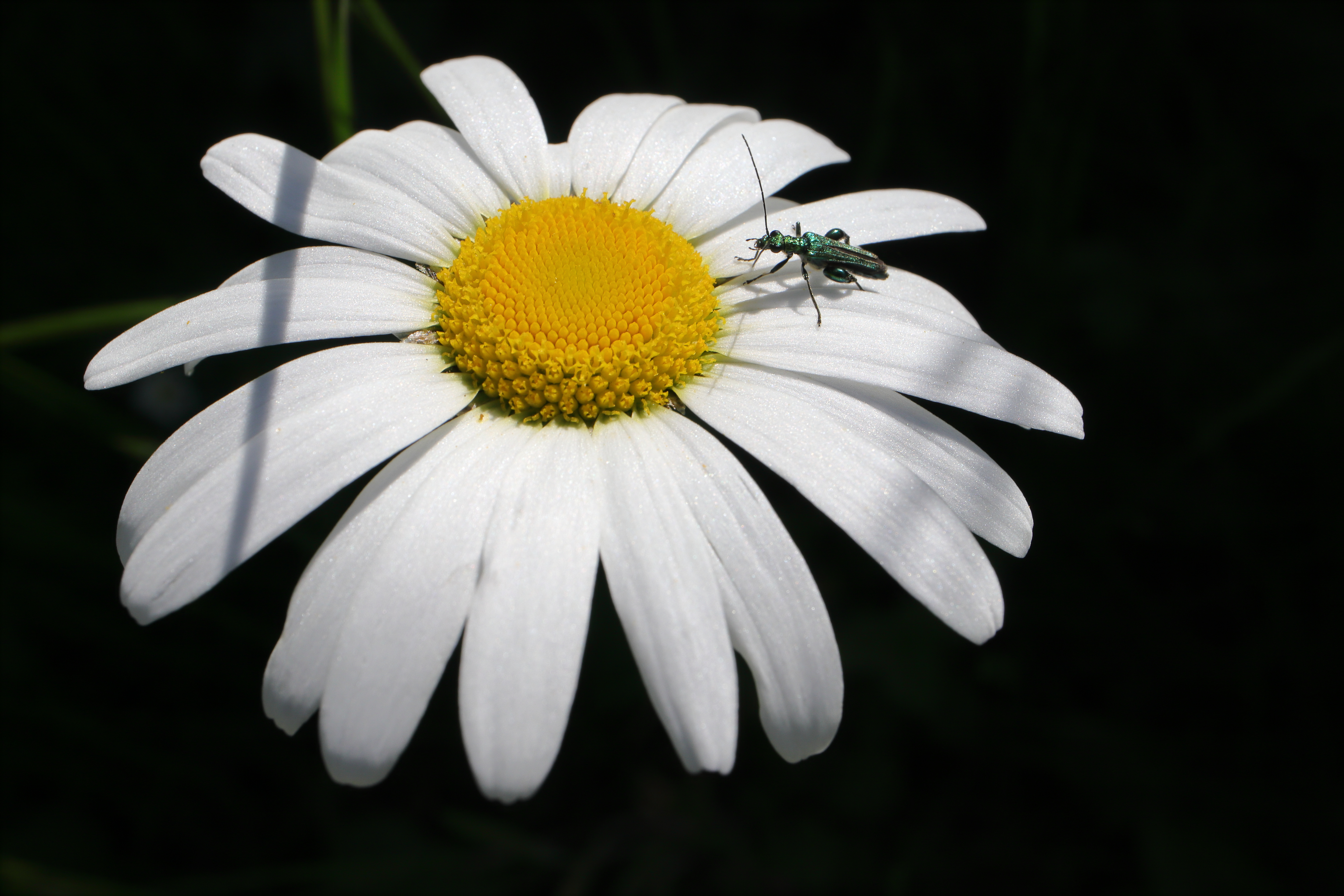
Male Oedemera nobilis on a large daisy
