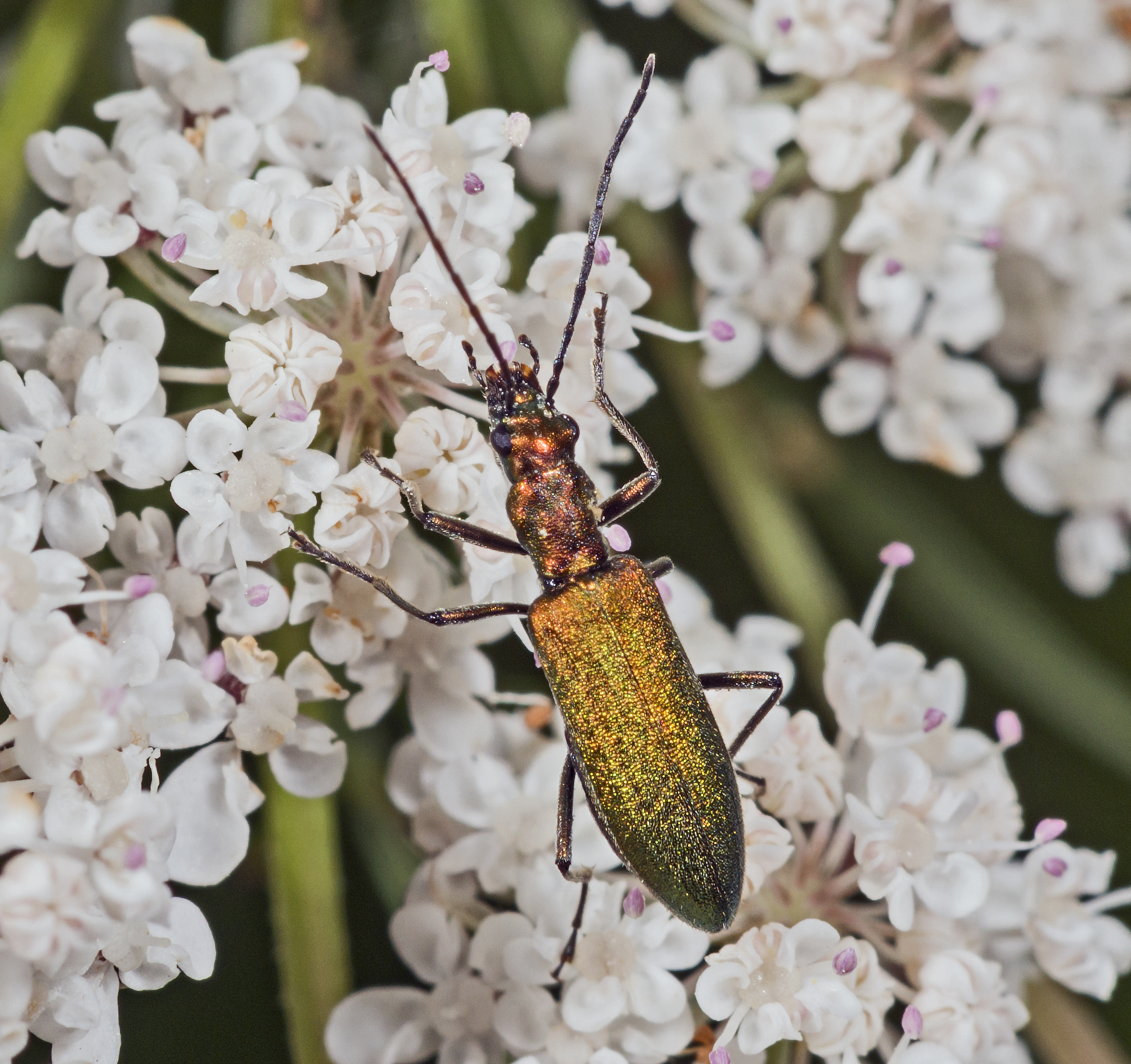
- Chrysanthia viridissima. Upperside
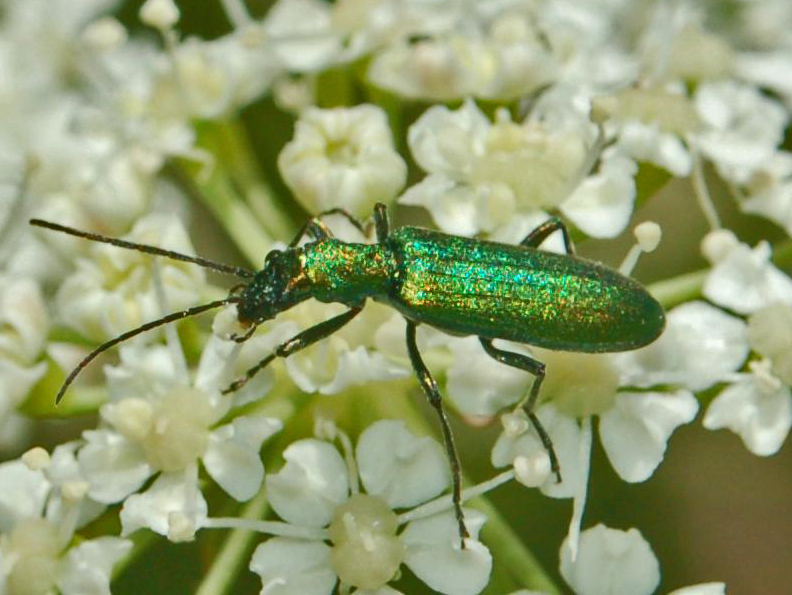
- Side view

Scientific classification
- Kingdom: Animalia
- Phylum: Arthropoda
- Clade: Pancrustacea
- Class: Insecta
- Order: Coleoptera
- Suborder: Polyphaga
- Infraorder: Cucujiformia
- Family: Oedemeridae
- Genus: Chrysanthia
- Species: C. viridissima

Binomial name
- Chrysanthia viridissima (Linnaeus, 1758)

Synonyms
- Cantharis viridissima Linnaeus, 1758; Chrysanthia viridis De Geer, 1775

= Chrysanthia viridissima =

Species of beetle

Chrysanthia viridissima is a species of beetles belonging to the family Oedemeridae subfamily Nacerdinae.

== Subspecies ==
Subspecies include:

- Cantharis viridissima var. cuprina Pic

== Distribution and habitat ==
These quite common beetles are present in most of Europe and in the eastern Palearctic realm (Albania, Austria, Bulgaria, Croatia, Czech Republic (Bohemia, Moravia), Finland, France, Germany, Greece, Hungary, Italy, Montenegro, Poland, Romania, Russia, Serbia, Slovakia, Slovenia, Spain, Sweden, and Switzerland). These beetles inhabit flowery meadows and woodlands.

== Description ==
Chrysanthia viridissima can grow up to 7–10 millimetres (0.28–0.39 in) long. These beetles have a soft and rather elongated bodies. The head is elongated. The mandibles are bifid. Antennae are long and filiform, composed by eleven segments. Pronotum is hearh-shaped. Elytra are densely punctured and have four longitudinal ribs. On the legs all pairs of coxae are enlarged. The legs and antennae are dark. Adults are metallic green (hence the Latin epithet viridissima, meaning very green), blue or coppery.

This species is rather similar to Chrysanthia geniculata, but they can be distinguished by the hair, the shape of the throat plate, the ribs on the elytra and the color.

== Biology ==
Adults are phytophagous. They can mostly be encountered from May through July feeding on pollen and nectar mainly of Apiaceae species, especially Angelica sylvestris and Heracleum sphondylium, but also on Cistus salviifolius (Cistaceae) and Achillea millefolium (Asteraceae). The larvae live inside roots or in dead wood, being xylophages.

== Gallery ==
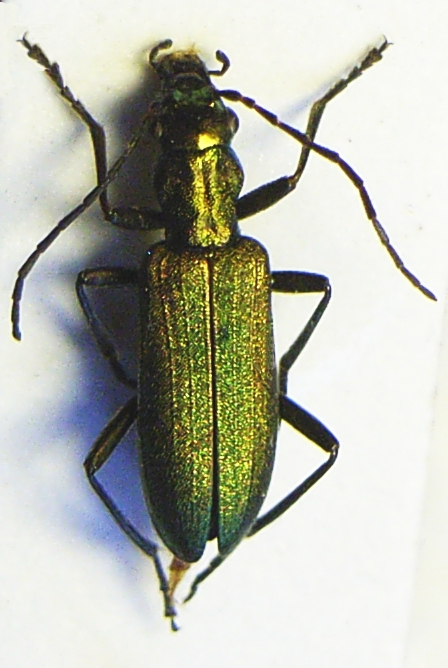
Female

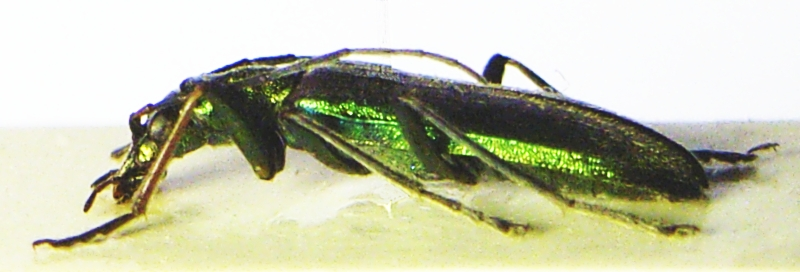
Side view

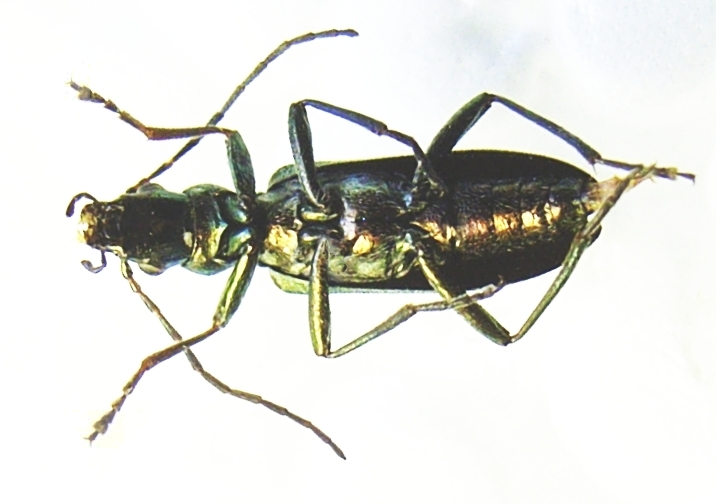
Underside

== Bibliography ==
- Linnaeus, C. 1758: Systema Naturae per regna tria naturæ, secundum classes, ordines, genera, species, cum characteribus, differentiis, synonymis, locis, Tomus I. Editio decima, reformata. Holmiæ: impensis direct. Laurentii Salvii. i–ii, 1–824 pp;p. 403
- Vazquez, X. A. - 1989 - El genero Chrysanthia Schmidt en la Peninsula Iberica (Col., Oedemeridae) - Elytron, 3: 125-136
- Vazquez, X. A. - 2002 - European Fauna of Oedemeridae - Argania editio, Barcelona, 179 pp.
- Edmund Reitter: Fauna Germanica - Die Käfer des Deutschen Reiches. 5 Bände, Stuttgart K. G. Lutz 1908 - 1916, Digitale Bibliothek Band 134, Directmedia Publishing GmbH, Berlin 2006, ISBN 3-898-53534-7
- Michael Chinery, Insectes d'Europe en couleurs, Bordas, 1987, 486 p. (ISBN 9 782040 125752 et 2-04-012575-2), p. 345
