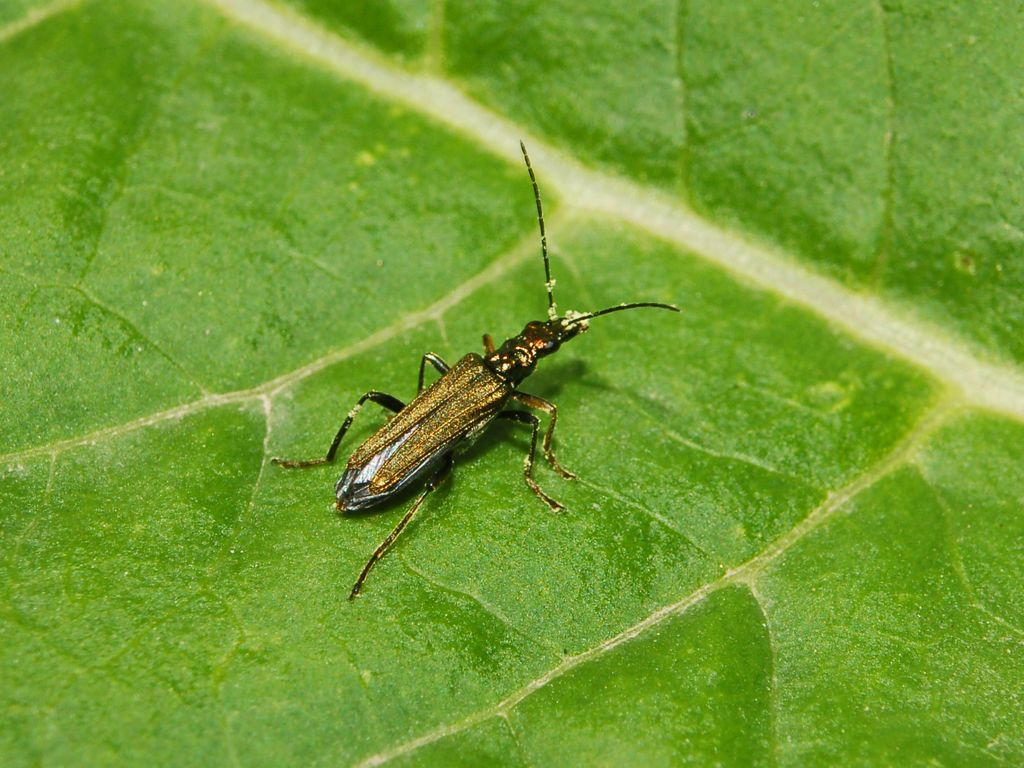
- Female

Scientific classification
- Kingdom: Animalia
- Phylum: Arthropoda
- Class: Insecta
- Order: Coleoptera
- Suborder: Polyphaga
- Infraorder: Cucujiformia
- Family: Oedemeridae
- Genus: Oedemera
- Species: O. flavipes

Binomial name
- Oedemera flavipes (Fabricius, 1792)
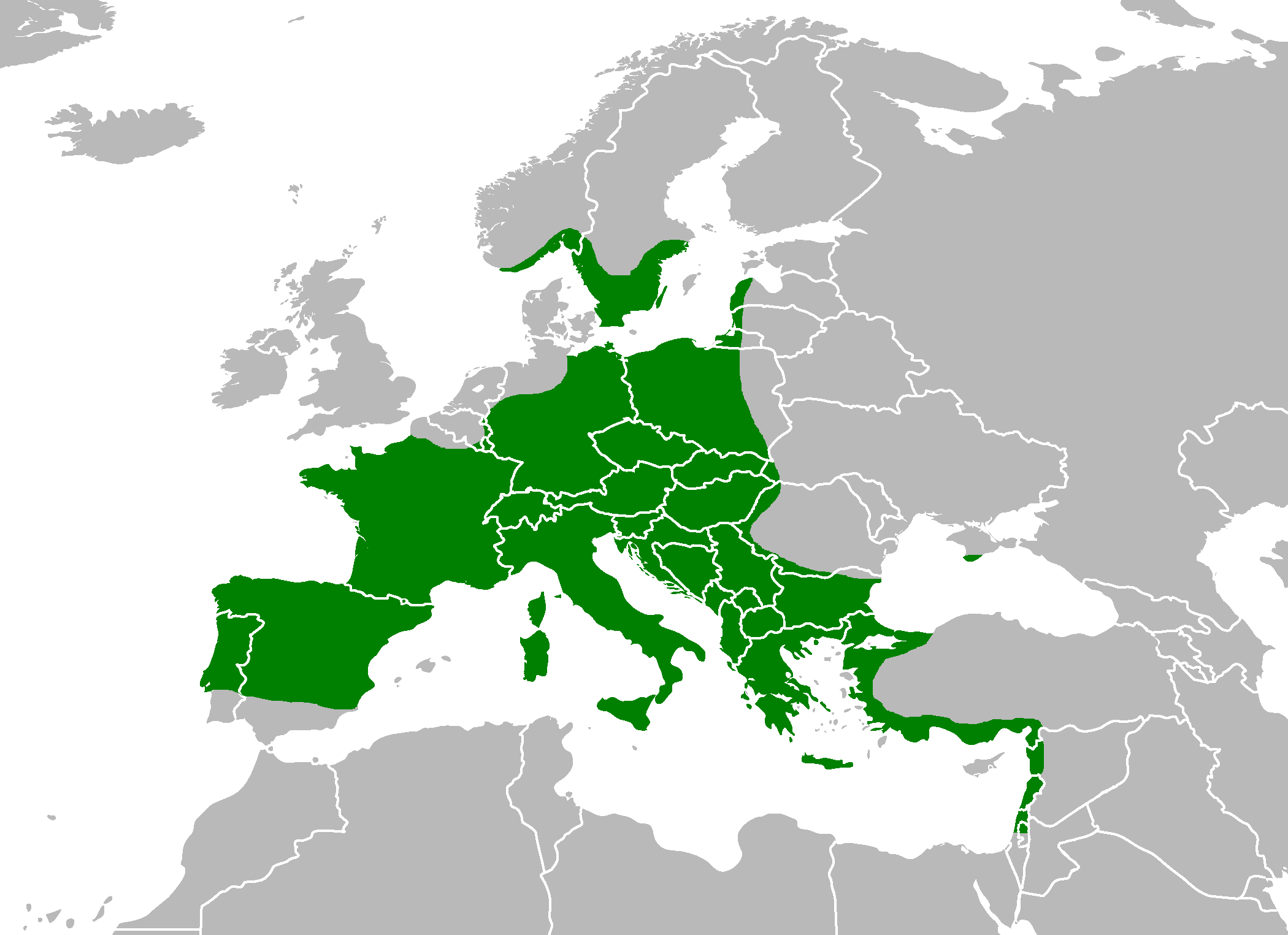

= Oedemera flavipes =

Species of beetle

Oedemera flavipes is a very common species of beetle of the family Oedemeridae, subfamily Oedemerinae.

These beetles are present in most of Europe and in the Near East.

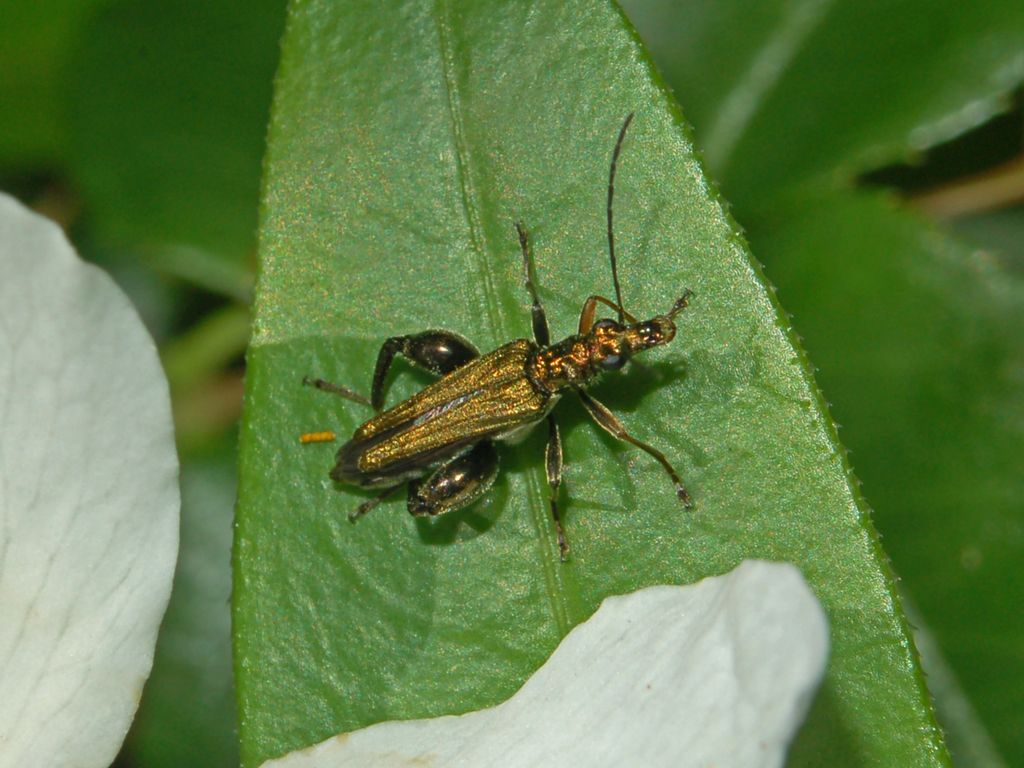
Oedemera flavipes – male

Their body is gray-green, dark green or coppery, while their forelegs are yellow (hence the Latin word flavipes) or reddish. As in most Oedemera species, the hind femora of the male are very swollen, whereas in the female the femora are thin.

The adults grow up to 9–11 millimetres (0.35–0.43 in) long and can mostly be encountered from May through July feeding on pollen and nectar, mainly on Asteraceae, Rosaceae, Convolvulaceae and Apiaceae species. They are a common prey of the checkered beetle, Trichodes alvearius.

The larvae develop in stems of herbaceous plants or in decaying branches.

== Similar species ==
Oedemera nobilis
