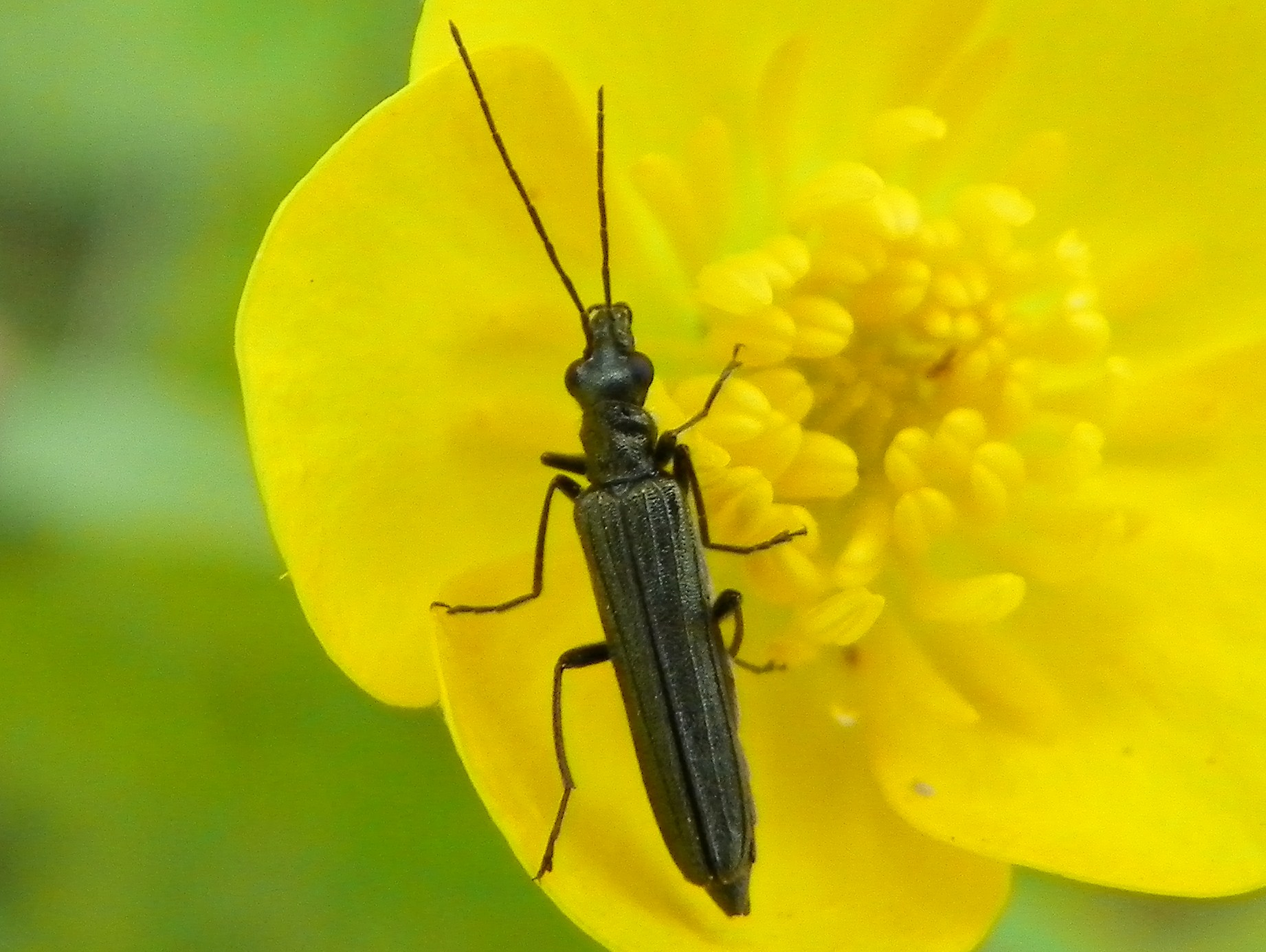

Scientific classification
- Domain: Eukaryota
- Kingdom: Animalia
- Phylum: Arthropoda
- Class: Insecta
- Order: Coleoptera
- Suborder: Polyphaga
- Infraorder: Cucujiformia
- Family: Oedemeridae
- Genus: Oedemera
- Species: O. lurida

Binomial name
- Oedemera lurida (Marsham, 1802)

= Oedemera lurida =

Species of beetle

Oedemera lurida is a species of beetle belonging to the family Oedemeridae subfamily Oedemerinae.

== Description ==
Oedemera lurida has a length of about 5–7 millimetres (0.20–0.28 in). The body of these insects is metallic pale-green, gray-green or brownish. Males of this species do not have the thickened hind femora of most males of the other Oedemera species. The elytra are narrow and covered with dense gray hairs. Antennae are eleven-segmented and finely pubescent.

This species belongs to a complex of three species, the Oedemera-lurida-complex, which are quite difficult to distinguish one from the other, as the separation relies on subtle characters. These beetles usually need to be dissected and examined under the microscope. While the Oedemera lurida is, on average, smaller than Oedemera virescens, size is not typically used to distinguish the two.

Larvae develop in rotten wood or humus and feed on stems of herbaceous plants and on rotten wood, while adult beetles feed on pollen and nectar of a wide variety of flowers, especially of umbels, Taraxacum and Ranunculus flowers and hawthorns. They can mostly be encountered from April through July.

== Distribution ==
These beetles are present in most of Europe, in North Africa and in the Near East.

== Habitat ==
Oedemera lurida lives in forests and forest edges, clearings, meadows and fields.
