= Wilhelm Ludwig Ewald Schmidt =

German physician, botanist, and entomologist

Wilhelm Ludwig Ewald Schmidt (4 May 1805 in Nattwerder (near Potsdam) – 5 June 1843 in Stettin) was a German physician, botanist, and entomologist. As an entomologist, he specialized in Coleoptera.

In 1828 he obtained his medical doctorate in Berlin; afterwards he taught classes at the Royal Gymnasium in Stettin. He was the first president of the Entomologischer Verein zu Stettin (Entomological Society of Stettin).

== Works ==
- Flora Sedinensis, exhibens plantas phanerogamas spontaneas, etc.; with Friedrich Wilhelm Gottlieb Rostkovius, 1824.
- Kurze Anweisung für junge Pharmaceuten das Studium der Botanik, 1830 - Short instruction for young pharmacists towards the study of botany.
- Getreue und systematische Beschreibung der officinellen Pflanzen der neuesten Preussischen Landes-pharmacopöe in abellarischer Uebersicht: Ein botanisches Handbuch für Studirende Mediciner und Pharmaceuten bearbeitet (T.C.F. Enslin, 1831) - Accurate and systematic description of officinal plants.
- Botanischer Wegweiser: oder praktische Unterweisung zweckgemäss das Studium der Botanik, 1837 - Botanical guide: or practical training purposes according to study of botany.
- Flora von Pommern und Rügen. Becker und Altendorf, Stettin, 1840 - Flora of Pomerania and Rügen.Flora von Pommern und Rügen
- Verzeichniss europäischer Käfer, 1840 - Directory of European beetles.
