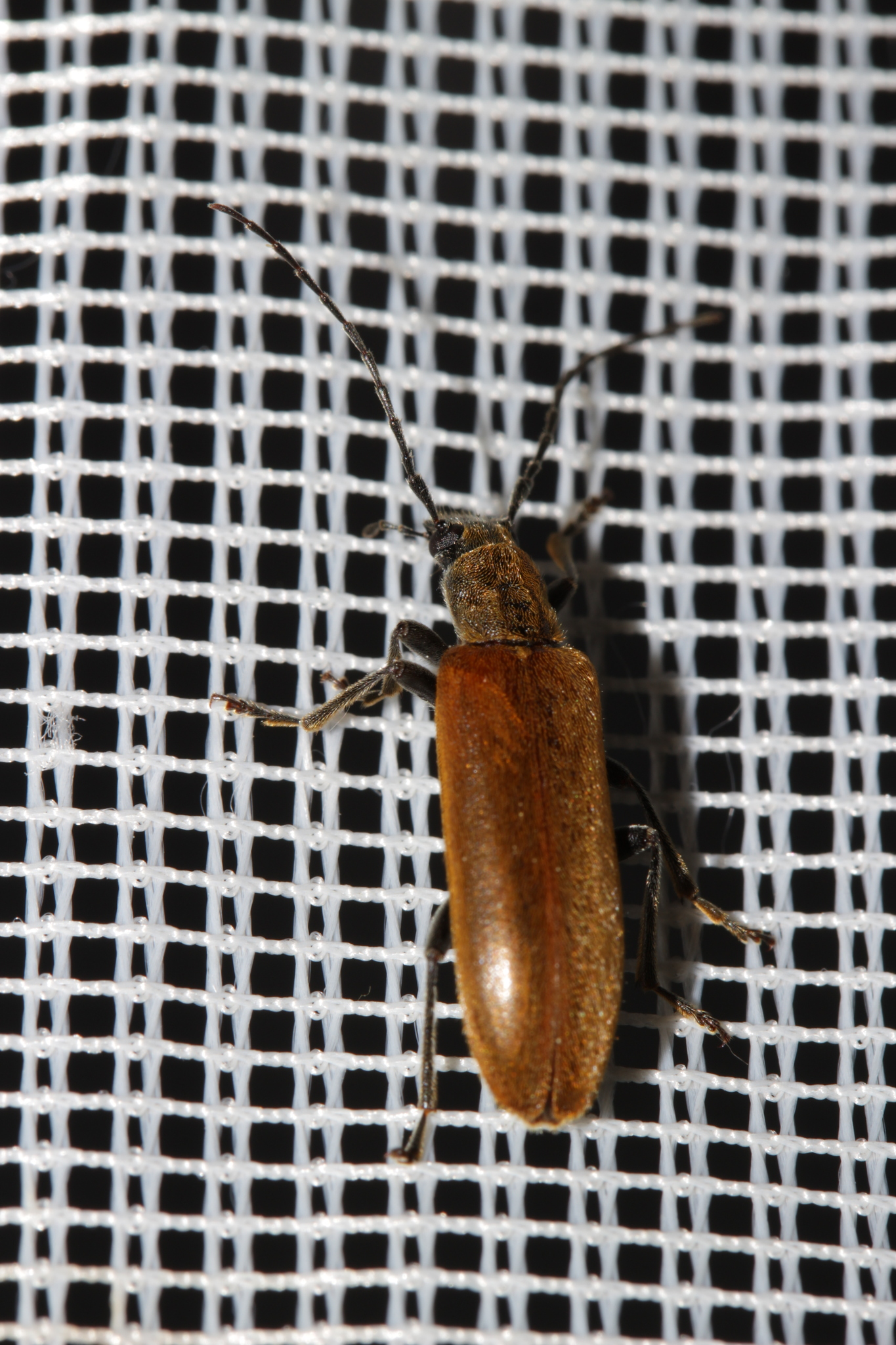
- Sparedrus testaceus

Scientific classification
- Kingdom: Animalia
- Phylum: Arthropoda
- Class: Insecta
- Order: Coleoptera
- Suborder: Polyphaga
- Infraorder: Cucujiformia
- Family: Oedemeridae
- Subfamily: Calopodinae
- Genus: Sparedrus; Dejean, 1821

= Sparedrus =

Genus of beetles

Sparedrus is a genus of false blister beetles in the family Oedemeridae. There are more than seven described species in Sparedrus.

== Species ==
These seven species belong to the genus Sparedrus:

- Sparedrus albipilis Svihla, 1983
- Sparedrus aspersus (LeConte, 1886)
- Sparedrus depressus (Champion, 1889)
- Sparedrus lencinae Vazquez, 1988
- Sparedrus longicollis Svihla, 2006
- Sparedrus orsinii Costa, 1852
- Sparedrus testaceus (Andersch, 1797)
