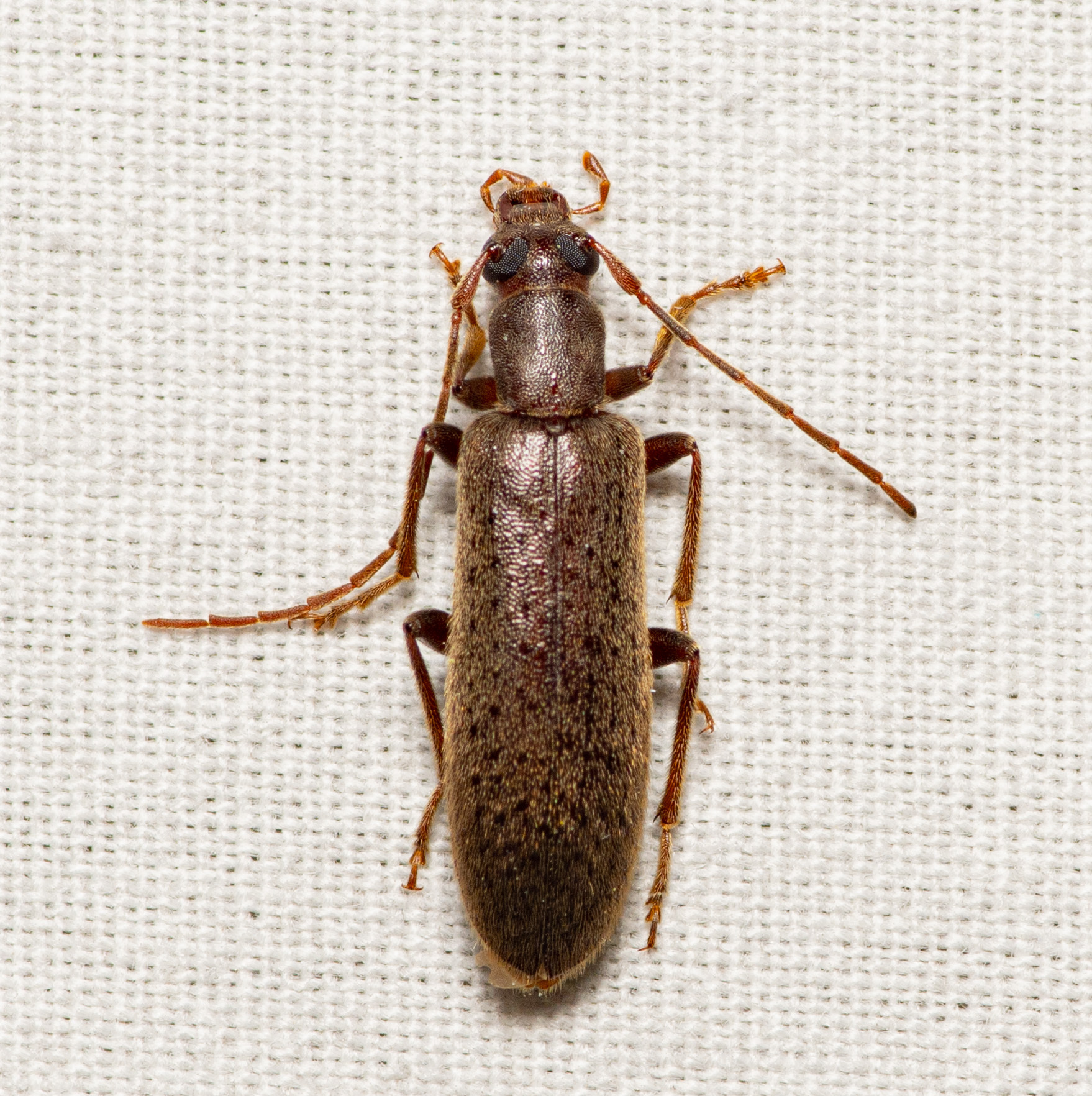

Scientific classification
- Kingdom: Animalia
- Phylum: Arthropoda
- Class: Insecta
- Order: Coleoptera
- Suborder: Polyphaga
- Infraorder: Cucujiformia
- Family: Oedemeridae
- Genus: Sparedrus
- Species: S. aspersus

Binomial name
- Sparedrus aspersus (LeConte, 1886)

= Sparedrus aspersus =

Species of beetle

Sparedrus aspersus is a species of false blister beetle in the family Oedemeridae. It is found in Central America and North America.
