= Courland Peninsula =

Distinct geographical, historical and cultural region in western Latvia

Coordinates: 57.2667°N 22.2500°E

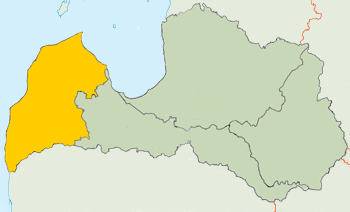
The Courland Peninsula is the northern part of Courland, a historical and cultural region in western Latvia (highlighted in yellow) on the map

The Courland Peninsula (Latvian: Kurzemes pussala, German: Kurland), also sometimes known as the Couronian Peninsula, is a distinct geographical, historical and cultural region in western Latvia. It represents the north-westernmost part of the broader region of Courland (Latvian: Kurzeme). The peninsula is renowned for its unique coastline, significant natural areas, rich history, and as the primary homeland of the indigenous Livonian people. Fourteen coastal villages located along the peninsula's northern and western shores constitute the officially recognized Livonian Coast (Livonian: Līvõd Rānda), the core area of Livonian settlement and culture.

Geographically, the peninsula is clearly defined by major bodies of water. It is bordered by the open Baltic Sea to the west and northwest, the Irbe Strait (Latvian: Irbes jūras šaurums) to the north (separating it from the Estonian island of Saaremaa), and the large, shallow Gulf of Riga to the east. It covers a significant portion of northwestern Latvia, encompassing parts of the modern administrative regions of Ventspils Municipality, Talsi Municipality, and potentially small parts of Kuldīga Municipality.

The Courland Peninsula played a critical strategic role during the final stages of World War II on the Eastern Front, becoming the site of the fierce and prolonged battles of the Courland Pocket. German forces of Army Group Courland were trapped here by the advancing Red Army from October 1944 until the final German surrender in May 1945.

== Geography ==
=== Topography and geology ===
The topography of the Courland Peninsula is predominantly low-lying, characteristic of the East European Plain. Its landscape was heavily shaped by the retreating glaciers of the last glacial period (Weichselian glaciation) and subsequent post-glacial rebound and marine processes. The geology consists mainly of Quaternary deposits (sands, gravels, clays) overlying older sedimentary rocks.

The most prominent feature is its extensive coastline, approximately 496-498 km long for Latvia in total, with a significant portion belonging to the peninsula. The western coast facing the Baltic Sea is relatively straight, characterized by sandy beaches backed by sand dunes and coastal forests, primarily Scots Pine. This coast is exposed to strong westerly winds and waves. The northern coast along the Irbe Strait culminates at Cape Kolka (Latvian: Kolkasrags), a significant navigational hazard due to submerged sandbanks. This cape marks the meeting point of the Baltic Sea and the Gulf of Riga. The eastern coast along the Gulf of Riga is more indented and sheltered, featuring shallower waters, coastal meadows, and lagoons.

Inland, the terrain is gently undulating. Large areas are covered by forests (about 52% of Latvia), primarily coniferous (pine, spruce) and mixed forests, interspersed with wetlands (bogs and fens), meadows, and agricultural land. The peninsula lacks significant highlands, with maximum elevations generally not exceeding 100 meters above sea level, though Latvia's highest point, Gaiziņkalns, is 312m. A notable feature is the Blue Hills of Slītere (Latvian: Zilie kalni) within Slītere National Park. These are ancient cliff formations (30-50m high) marking a former coastline of the Baltic Ice Lake. They represent some of the most distinct relief elements on the peninsula. Fossilized amber from a much earlier sub-tropical period (approx. 40 million years ago) can sometimes be found washed ashore after storms.

=== Hydrography ===
The hydrography of the peninsula is characterized by numerous small rivers and lakes. Major rivers draining the area include the Irbe River, which flows northwards into the strait of the same name within Slītere National Park, draining large wetland areas inland. The Roja River flows eastwards into the Gulf of Riga at the town of Roja. Other smaller rivers like the Stende and Užava also drain parts of the peninsula.

Several shallow coastal lakes exist, often former lagoons separated from the sea by sand spits. Lake Puzes is one of the larger lakes located further inland. The extensive wetland systems, particularly the large peat bogs and the unique 'kangari-vigas' landscape (dune ridges alternating with marshy depressions) found in Slītere, play a crucial role in the region's hydrology and biodiversity.

=== Climate ===
The Courland Peninsula experiences a temperate maritime climate (Köppen climate classification: Cfb), heavily influenced by the surrounding Baltic Sea. This results in milder winters and cooler summers compared to inland parts of Latvia. The sea moderates temperatures, reducing the range of annual temperature fluctuations. However, the region is known for its windiness, especially along the coast and particularly at Cape Kolka. Precipitation is distributed relatively evenly throughout the year, often occurring as rain or drizzle, with snowfall common in winter, though persistent snow cover can be variable. Fog is also frequent, particularly during transitional seasons near the coast.

== History ==
=== Early history ===
Archaeological evidence, including Stone Age settlements, suggests human presence on the Courland Peninsula dating back thousands of years. The Livonians, a Finnic people, claim to have inhabited the area for over 5,000 years. In the centuries preceding the Middle Ages, the region was primarily inhabited by Finnic peoples, specifically the Livonians (referred to as 'rāndalist' - coast dwellers), particularly along the coast, and Baltic peoples, mainly the Curonians, further inland and along the southern parts of the peninsula. The strategic location along Baltic Sea trade routes meant the area experienced interactions during the Viking Age. Cape Kolka's ancient name, Domesnes, is mentioned on a Swedish rune stone around 1040 AD.

=== Medieval Period and Livonian Order ===
Beginning in the late 12th and early 13th centuries, the region was drawn into the conflicts of the Northern Crusades. German crusaders, organised initially under the Livonian Brothers of the Sword and later the Teutonic Order (specifically its autonomous branch, the Livonian Order), sought to conquer and Christianize the local pagan tribes. By the mid-13th century, most of Courland, including the peninsula, fell under the control of the Livonian Order and the newly established Bishopric of Courland. Castles were built (e.g., at Dundaga and Ventspils), German nobility became the dominant landowning class, and the local populations were gradually subjugated.

=== Duchy of Courland and Semigallia ===
Following the dissolution of the Livonian Order during the Livonian War, the Duchy of Courland and Semigallia was created in 1561 under Gotthard Kettler, the last Master of the Order, as a vassal state of the Grand Duchy of Lithuania and later the Polish–Lithuanian Commonwealth. The Courland Peninsula formed the northern part of the Duchy. Under Duke Jacob Kettler (reigned 1642–1682), the Duchy experienced its golden age. Influenced by mercantilism, he significantly developed metalworking, shipbuilding (especially in Ventspils using local timber and skilled foreign artisans), and international trade through its main ports of Ventspils (Windau) and Liepāja (Libau). The Duchy established overseas colonies in Gambia (St. Andrews Island, 1651) and Tobago (1652). However, the Swedish invasion (1658-1660) devastated the Duchy, capturing the Duke and destroying the fleet and factories, from which it never fully recovered.

=== Russian Empire ===
In 1795, during the Third Partition of Poland, the Duchy was annexed by the Russian Empire, becoming the Courland Governorate. Ventspils continued its development as an important ice-free port, especially after connection to the Moscow railway network facilitated large-scale grain exports. The region came under Russification policies in the late 19th century.

=== World War I ===
During World War I, German forces occupied the Courland Peninsula in 1915. Many inhabitants, including Livonians, fled or were displaced. The German army constructed a narrow-gauge railway along the coast for military transport, connecting villages like Pitrags, Mazirbe, and Lielirbe.

=== Interwar Latvia ===
After the Latvian War of Independence (1918–1920), the peninsula became part of the independent Republic of Latvia (1918–1940). Fishing, forestry, and agriculture were the main economic activities. A Livonian cultural revival saw the establishment of the Livonian Community House in Mazirbe (1939), supported by Finland and Estonia. The narrow-gauge railway remained the primary mode of passenger transport along the coast during this period.

=== World War II and the Courland Pocket ===
Following the Soviet occupation of Latvia in 1940 and subsequent German occupation in 1941, the Courland Peninsula became strategically vital late in the war. In October 1944, the Red Army's Baltic Offensive isolated German Army Group North (renamed Army Group Courland in January 1945) on the peninsula. Around 200,000 German soldiers and some allied units were trapped in the Courland Pocket. Soviet forces launched six major offensives between October 1944 and April 1945 to eliminate the pocket, but the defenders held out. The fighting caused immense destruction. Army Group Courland, consisting of the 16th and 18th Armies under General Carl Hilpert, formally surrendered on May 8-10, 1945, following Germany's overall capitulation. Approximately 180,000-189,000 German troops were taken prisoner in the pocket.

=== Soviet period ===
After WWII, Latvia was re-incorporated into the Soviet Union as the Latvian SSR. The entire western coast of Courland, including the peninsula, was designated a heavily militarized Soviet border zone. Access was severely restricted, beaches were raked nightly, patrolled by border guards, and illuminated by searchlights. Fishing was curtailed, and many coastal inhabitants, including Livonians, were forced to move inland to cities like Ventspils and Riga, leading to the abandonment of villages. This period was devastating for Livonian culture and language. The restricted access, however, unintentionally preserved large natural areas. Secret military installations like the Irbene radio telescope were built.

=== Post-independence ===
Following Latvia's restored independence in 1991, the border zone restrictions were lifted. On February 4, 1991, the government established the Livonian Coast (Līvõd Rānda) as a culturally protected territory, encompassing twelve Livonian villages. There are ongoing efforts to revitalize the Livonian language and culture, supported by organizations like the Livonian Union (Līvõd Īt) and the Livonian Cultural Centre (Līvõ Kultūr Sidām). Tourism focusing on nature (Slītere National Park) and cultural heritage has grown. Ventspils continues as a major port and has developed into an industrial and tourist center. Forestry and fishing remain important, and wind power potential is being explored.

== Livonian heritage ==
The Courland Peninsula is the primary remaining homeland of the Livonians (Livonian: līvlizt), a Finnic people indigenous to Latvia. Historically more widespread, their settlements concentrated on this coast over centuries.

=== Livonian language ===
The Livonian language (Livonian: līvõ kēļ) is a Finnic language, closely related to Estonian. It is classified as critically endangered. The last known fluent native speaker from the older generation, Grizelda Kristiņa, died in Canada in 2013. However, language revitalization efforts are active, supported by the Livonian community and institutions like the Livonian Institute at the University of Latvia (established 2018). There are currently several dozen L2 speakers with varying degrees of fluency, and importantly, at least one child being raised with Livonian as a first language since 2020. Initiatives include language camps (like "Mierlinkizt"), publications, and online resources. In 2023, the first bilingual Latvian/Livonian road signs were installed in Talsi Municipality.

=== Livonian Coast ===
The Livonian Coast (Livonian: Līvõd Rānda) is a legally recognized state-protected historical and cultural territory established in 1991. It encompasses twelve villages: Lūžņa (Lūž), Miķeļtornis (Pizā), Lielirbe (Īra), Jaunciems (Ūžkilā), Sīkrags (Sīkrõg), Mazirbe (Irē), Košrags (Kuoštrõg), Saunags (Sǟnag), Vaide (Vaid), Kolka (Kūolka), Pitrags (Pitrõg), and Melnsils (Mustānum). The Latvian government discourages inappropriate development and alterations to historical village sites within this zone. These villages, varying in layout from compact clusters to linear settlements stretched along the shore, preserve traditional architecture and cultural landscapes reflecting the Livonian maritime heritage.

=== Culture ===
Livonian culture is deeply connected to the sea, with traditional livelihoods based on fishing, seal hunting, and boat building. Their folklore, music (e.g., the folk group Skandinieki, musician Julgī Stalte), and traditions reflect this. The Livonian flag (green, white, blue) represents the forests, beaches, and sea. The annual Livonian Festival in Mazirbe, held on the first weekend of August since 1989, is a key event celebrating Livonian identity.

== Nature and conservation ==
The Courland Peninsula holds significant natural value, with large areas preserved due to low population density and past access restrictions.

=== Slītere National Park ===
Slītere National Park (Latvian: Slīteres nacionālais parks), formally established in 2000 but based on a nature reserve dating back to 1923, is located in the northern part of the peninsula. It covers 265 km² (102 sq mi), including 101 km² (39 sq mi) of marine territory, making it Latvia's smallest national park. The park protects a diverse complex of ecosystems:

Ancient broadleaf forests on the Blue Hills of Slītere (Zilie Kalni). Coastal dune systems (kangari) and inter-dune bogs (vigas). Sandy beaches and coniferous forests. The park boasts high biodiversity, hosting hundreds of plant and bryophyte species (29 unique to Latvia), rare insects and snails, and mammals like wolf, lynx, and elk. It is a crucial location along Baltic bird migration flyways, particularly Cape Kolka, where tens of thousands of birds can pass per hour during peak migration (especially spring). Of the 338 bird species recorded in Latvia, 261 have been observed in the park. The coastal waters are important for wintering water birds and are a southern breeding area for Grey seals. The historic Slītere Lighthouse, located inland on the Blue Hills, serves as a visitor center.

=== Other natural assets ===
Beyond Slītere, the peninsula has other protected areas. The extensive forests are economically important but also vital habitats. The relatively undeveloped coastline offers clean beaches but faces increasing pressure from development and coastal erosion. Conservation laws aim to protect a coastal belt, but enforcement can be challenging.

== Economy ==
The peninsula's economy includes traditional sectors and modern industry.

Ports and logistics: The ice-free Port of Ventspils is a major economic driver, historically a key transit hub for Russia and CIS countries, handling oil products, chemicals, coal, grain, and other cargoes. It's one of the busiest ports in the Baltic States, capable of handling large Aframax and Panamax vessels due to significant deepening in 1998. Cargo turnover was around 10.4 million tons in 2023. Ventspils operates as a Freeport and Special Economic Zone, offering tax incentives. Smaller ports like Roja support the fishing industry. Fishing: A traditional occupation, particularly along the Gulf of Riga and Livonian Coast, focused in towns like Roja and Kolka. It faces challenges from quotas and historical restrictions but remains culturally and economically significant. Forestry: Extensive forests support logging and wood processing industries. Tourism: Growing since the 1990s, attracting visitors to Slītere National Park, beaches, the Livonian Coast, and cities like Ventspils, which promotes family tourism and has won awards for business friendliness. Rural tourism, birdwatching, and cycling are popular. Manufacturing: Ventspils has actively pursued industrialization since 2002, developing industrial parks and attracting manufacturing enterprises, significantly boosting production output. Renewable Energy: High wind potential exists, especially on the western coast. Ventspils is positioning itself as a hub for offshore wind energy support and potentially green hydrogen/Power-to-X projects.

== Notable settlements ==
- Ventspils: Largest city, major ice-free port, industrial center, and tourist destination. Founded around 1290.
- Kolka: Largest village on the Livonian Coast at Cape Kolka. Center for visiting Slītere National Park.
- Roja: Fishing port town on the Gulf of Riga.
- Mazirbe: Cultural center of the Livonian Coast, location of the Livonian Community House and annual festival.
- Dundaga: Inland village known for its medieval castle.
- Miķeļtornis: Livonian Coast village with the tallest lighthouse in the Baltics.
- Košrags, Pitrags, Saunags, Vaide, Sīkrags: Smaller Livonian Coast villages preserving traditional character.
