= Cape Kolka =

Cape in Latvia

Cape Kolka Livonian: Kūolka nanā, Latvian: Kolkasrags
- Cape
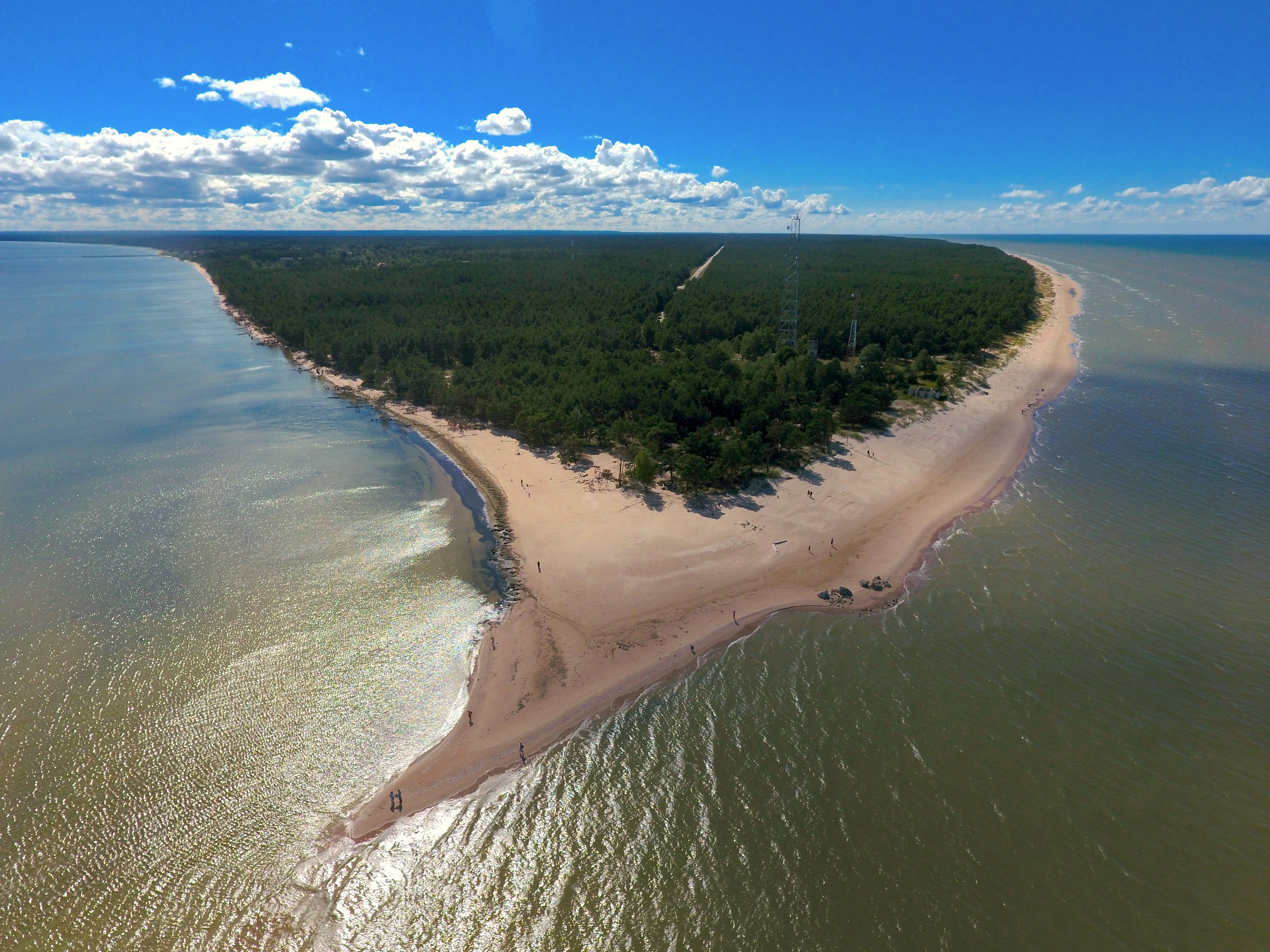
- Cape Kolka

- Location within Latvia
- Coordinates: 57°45′32.2″N 22°36′17.1″E
- Water bodies: Irbe Strait, Gulf of Riga, Baltic Sea
- Elevation: 2 m (6.6 ft)

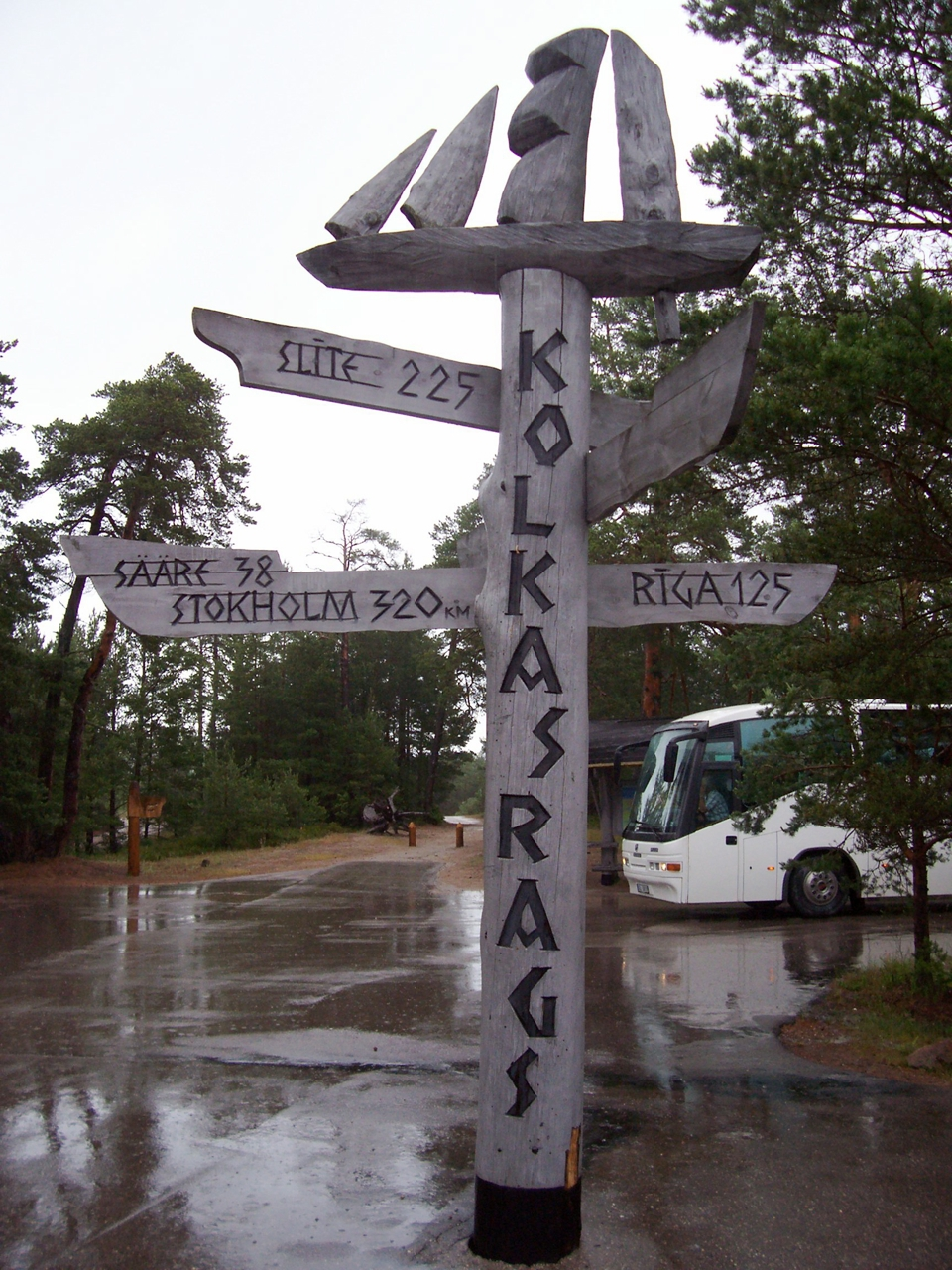
Kolka Signpost

Cape Kolka (Livonian: Kūolka nanā, Latvian: Kolkasrags) is a cape on the Baltic Sea, near the entry to Gulf of Riga, on the Livonian coast, in the Courland Peninsula of Latvia. The cape is surrounded by the Irbe Strait (Irbes šaurums) which serves as the natural border with Estonia. Cape Kolka represents the north-western limit of the Gulf of Riga. East of the cape is the island of Ruhnu (Estonia) that lies in the middle of the Gulf.

Near the cape is Kolka Lighthouse and the village of Kolka. There is a line of picturesque old Livonian settlements along the Baltic Sea shore, including Vaide, Saunags, Pitrags, Košrags and Sīkrags, all included into the culturally protected territory "Livonian Coast".

== Coastal dune ecology ==
Situated on the north-western tip of the Courland Peninsula, Cape Kolka lies within Slītere National Park on the Baltic Sea coast of Latvia. The cape is fringed by a belt of seacoast wooded dunes, where boreal dry Scots pine (Pinus sylvestris) forms the dominant tree cover on nutrient-poor, well-drained sandy soils. These forests experience regular wind-driven sand movement, which can partially bury stems to depths exceeding 0.6 m during severe storm events. Major burial episodes in 1967–1969 and again in January 2005 mobilised enough sand to suppress radial growth in buried trees—evidenced by narrow or missing tree rings—before post-erosion recovery restored normal growth rates.

The dune topography around Cape Kolka is defined by ridges and interdune depressions rising approximately 4–10 m above sea level, with the Baltic Sea exerting a stabilising influence on local microclimate and soil moisture. Historically, low levels of human disturbance—owing in part to its status as a restricted border zone in the former Soviet era—have allowed these dynamic pine-dominated dunes to persist, serving both as a natural laboratory for coastal geomorphology and as a valuable protected habitat under EU conservation directives.

Cape Kolka also marks the terminus of a more than 700 km-long, counter-clockwise sediment transport cell stretching from the Kaliningrad shore to Pärnu Bay. An estimated 700,000–800,000 m^{3} of sand is driven annually alongshore towards the cape, of which roughly 90 % is deposited immediately to its north; only about 50,000 m^{3} continues into the Gulf of Riga.

=== Strandplain geomorphology ===
Cape Kolka sits at the distal tip of a progradational strandplain that extends roughly 70 km along the western Latvian coast and reaches up to 10 km in width. Ground-penetrating radar surveys reveal a belt of semi-parallel sand ridges underlain by gently dipping (2°–18°) beach-face deposits, recording successive episodes of shoreward sediment accumulation and coastal progradation over time.

== Climate ==
Climate data for Cape Kolka (1991−2020 normals, extremes 1980−present)
Month	Jan	Feb	Mar	Apr	May	Jun	Jul	Aug	Sep	Oct	Nov	Dec	Year
Record high °C (°F)	13.0 (55.4)	14.3 (57.7)	17.3 (63.1)	23.5 (74.3)	27.4 (81.3)	30.2 (86.4)	30.3 (86.5)	32.1 (89.8)	29.3 (84.7)	21.5 (70.7)	15.9 (60.6)	11.5 (52.7)	32.1 (89.8)
Mean maximum °C (°F)	6.6 (43.9)	6.8 (44.2)	10.5 (50.9)	17.2 (63.0)	22.3 (72.1)	24.6 (76.3)	26.0 (78.8)	26.2 (79.2)	21.7 (71.1)	16.1 (61.0)	10.8 (51.4)	7.3 (45.1)	27.7 (81.9)
Mean daily maximum °C (°F)	0.7 (33.3)	0.5 (32.9)	3.2 (37.8)	8.1 (46.6)	13.7 (56.7)	17.9 (64.2)	21.0 (69.8)	20.7 (69.3)	16.3 (61.3)	10.4 (50.7)	5.4 (41.7)	2.4 (36.3)	10.0 (50.1)
Daily mean °C (°F)	−0.8 (30.6)	−1.6 (29.1)	0.5 (32.9)	4.6 (40.3)	9.6 (49.3)	14.0 (57.2)	17.3 (63.1)	17.0 (62.6)	13.1 (55.6)	8.0 (46.4)	3.7 (38.7)	0.9 (33.6)	7.2 (44.9)
Mean daily minimum °C (°F)	−2.2 (28.0)	−3.5 (25.7)	−2.2 (28.0)	1.2 (34.2)	5.5 (41.9)	10.4 (50.7)	13.7 (56.7)	13.4 (56.1)	10.1 (50.2)	5.7 (42.3)	2.2 (36.0)	−0.4 (31.3)	4.5 (40.1)
Mean minimum °C (°F)	−12.4 (9.7)	−12.1 (10.2)	−9.6 (14.7)	−4.4 (24.1)	−1.2 (29.8)	3.5 (38.3)	8.2 (46.8)	7.4 (45.3)	2.9 (37.2)	−2.0 (28.4)	−4.3 (24.3)	−8.5 (16.7)	−15.1 (4.8)
Record low °C (°F)	−27.9 (−18.2)	−31.5 (−24.7)	−21.9 (−7.4)	−8.1 (17.4)	−7.1 (19.2)	−0.3 (31.5)	4.3 (39.7)	1.0 (33.8)	−3.2 (26.2)	−5.8 (21.6)	−9.1 (15.6)	−18.9 (−2.0)	−31.5 (−24.7)
Average precipitation mm (inches)	41.5 (1.63)	34.6 (1.36)	33.4 (1.31)	31.8 (1.25)	32.0 (1.26)	60.3 (2.37)	74.0 (2.91)	77.6 (3.06)	58.1 (2.29)	71.7 (2.82)	54.1 (2.13)	48.4 (1.91)	617.5 (24.31)
Average precipitation days (≥ 1 mm)	10.8	9.2	8.0	7.2	6.3	8.7	8.7	9.9	9.0	12.4	11.3	11.6	113.1
Mean monthly sunshine hours	30.6	64.7	148.2	214.8	270.3	284.4	265.9	226.2	161.6	94.5	31.4	26.7	1,819.3
Source: infoclimat.fr

== See also ==
- Livonian people
