= Slītere National Park =

National park in Latvia

- IUCN category II (national park)
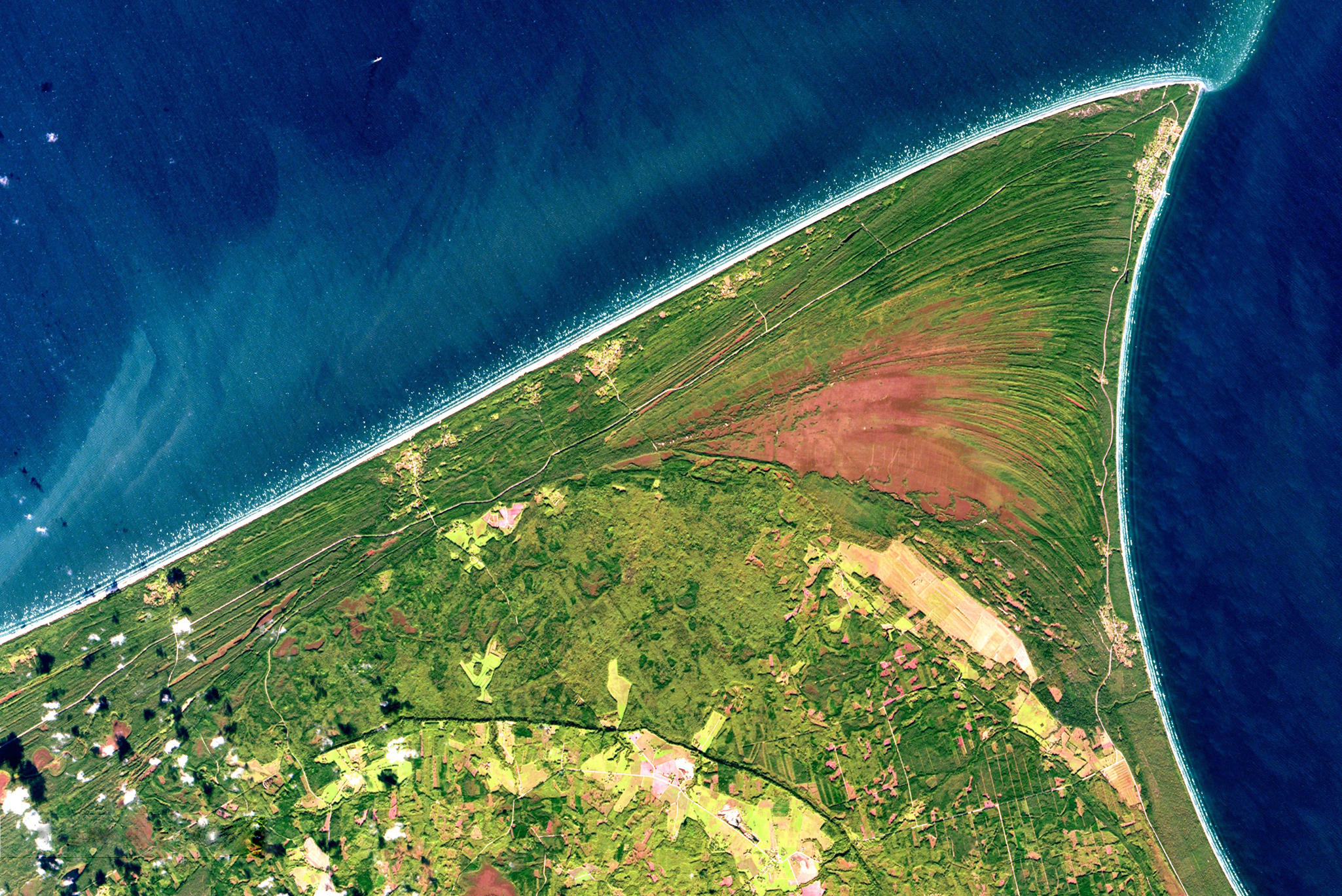
- An October 2022 satellite image

- Location within Latvia
- Location: Talsi Municipality, Courland, Latvia
- Coordinates: 57°37′27″N 22°17′40″E
- Area: 265 km^{2} (102 sq mi)
- Established: 2000

Slītere National Park (Latvian: Slīteres nacionālais parks) is a national park in Talsi Municipality, Courland, on the west coast of Latvia. Although formally established in 2000, it is based on the former Slītere Nature Reserve, one of the oldest nature reserves in Baltic States. It is the smallest national park in Latvia.

== Geography ==
The park is set in the Courland Peninsula, at the point of cape Kolka that marks the end of the Irbe Strait, the southern way out of the bay of Riga.

It covers an area of 265 km^{2} (102 sq mi) (including 101 km^{2} (39 sq mi) in the Baltic Sea), making it the smallest national park in Latvia.

The "Zilie Kalni" or "Blue Hills" are one of the most recognizable geological features of the park. Thousands of years ago, the Zilie Kalni formed the ancient shore of the Baltic ice lake. Further back in time, 40 M years ago, the climate was sub-tropical; fossilized amber from that period is still found by the sea-shore after heavy storms have stirred the sediments on the sea bed.

The small Irbe River runs south-west/north-east, following the coastal line of the Irbe Strait towards the Baltic Sea, and reaches the sea within the Slītere national park. Its brown moor waters constantly move the sandbanks in its estuary. In late Autumn, brown trouts swim upriver to reach their spawning grounds.

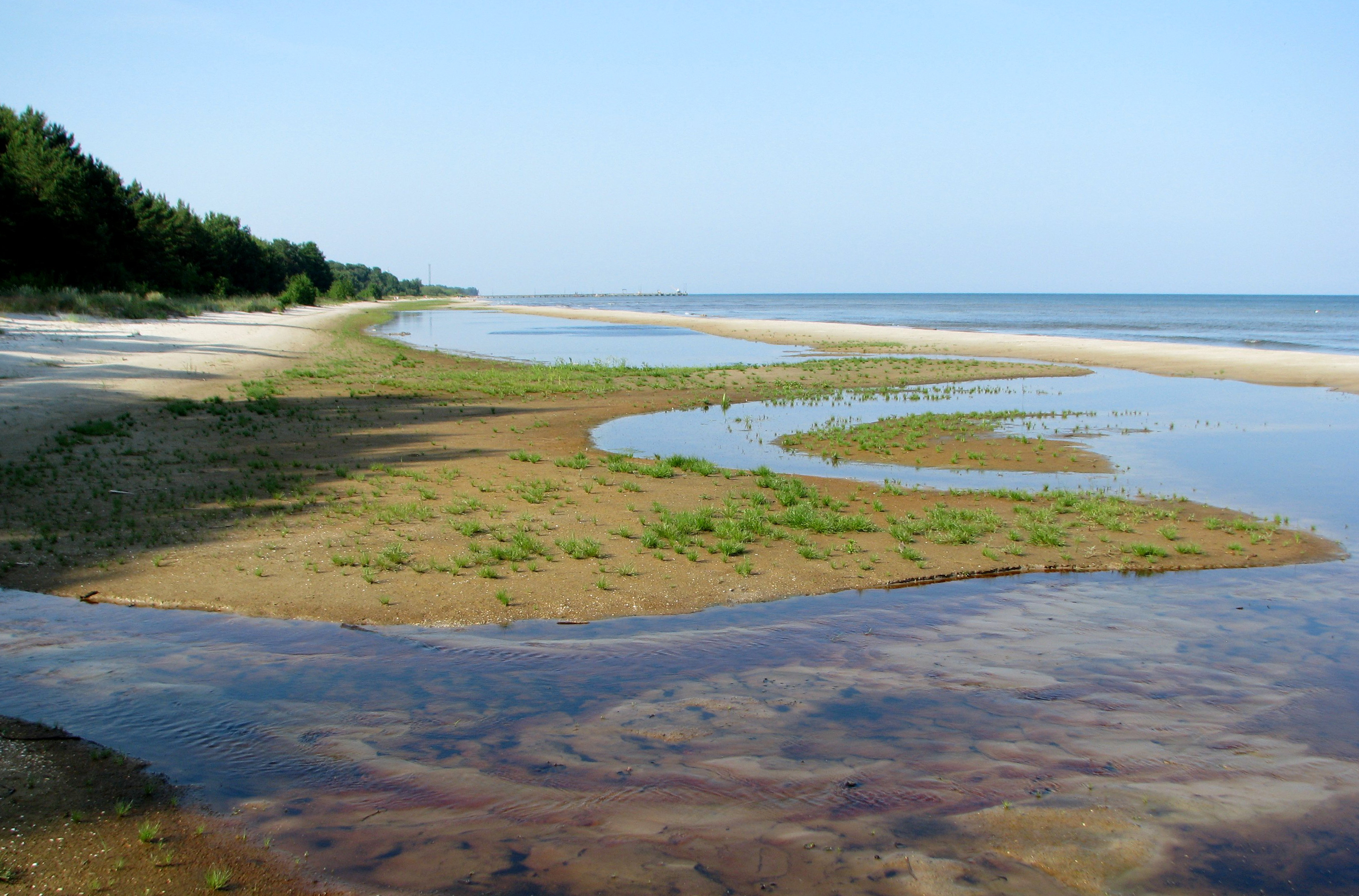
Riga Bay's western coast near cape Kolka

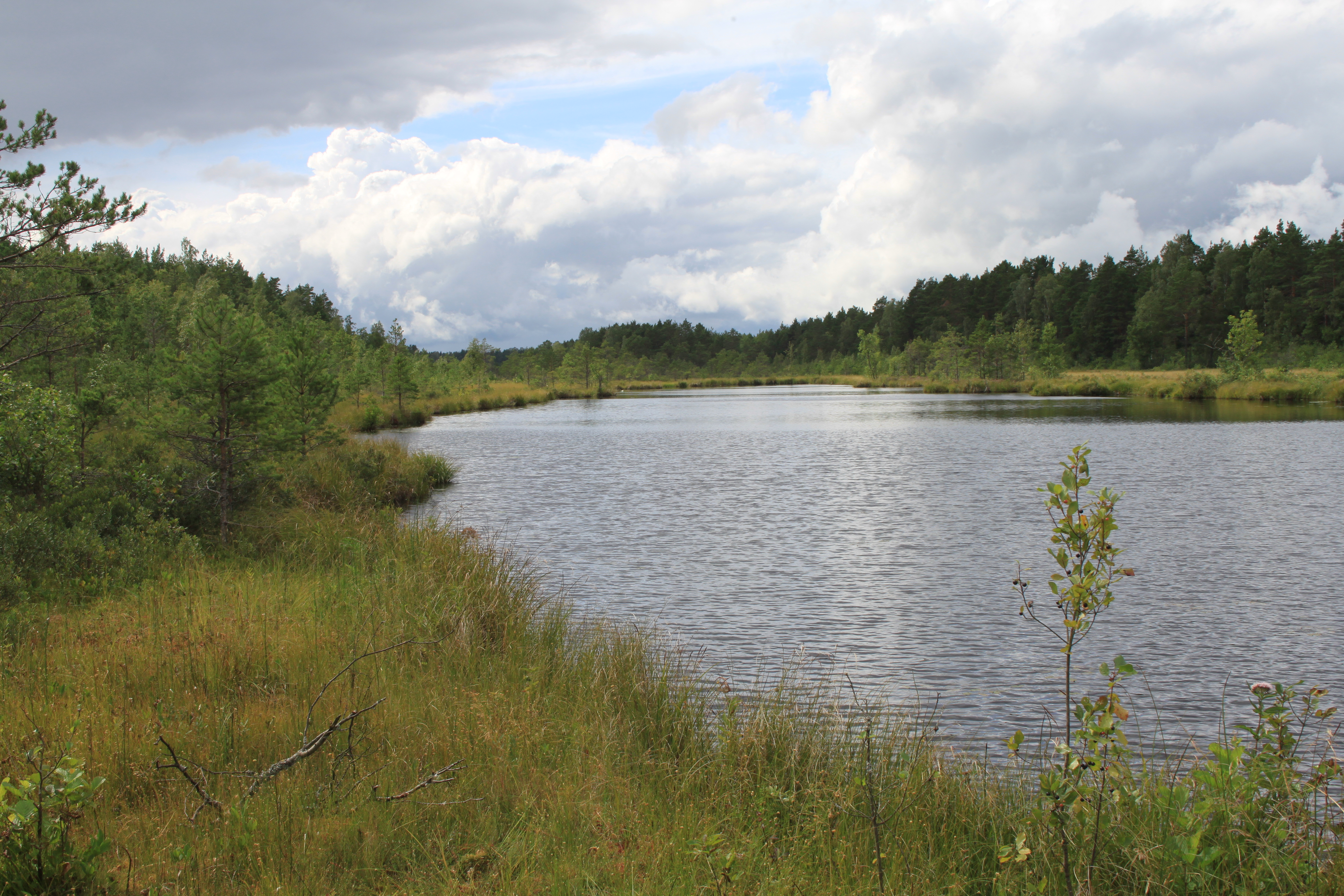
Lielais Peterezers, lake in Kolka parish, near the Sīkrags hamlet on the western coast of the Courland Peninsula.

== Flora ==
Slītere National Park is famous for the broadleaf forests covering former coastline and for the unique complex of dunes (called kangari in Latvian) and depressions (vigas) featuring inter-dune bogs. Most of the broadleaf forest is located on the "Zilie Kalni" or "Blue Hills".
Another 30% of the park is covered by coniferous forest.

The park hosts hundreds of species of plants and bryophytes, 29 species of which are found nowhere else in Latvia.

== Fauna ==
Slītere National Park lies along the Baltic migratory flyways, making Slītere one of the best places in Latvia for birdwatching. For example, its sea shore is a stopover in late Autumn for the bar-tailed godwit on its way south from the northern tundra; the great grey owl migrates here from Russia in winter. Virtually all species of bird found in Latvia have been observed in Slītere, with many as 60,000 birds per hour having been observed flying over during the spring and fall migrations.

The grey wolf, Eurasian lynx, and elk can all be found within Slītere. The national park has many rare species of insect and snail due to its high plant and biome diversity. Along the coast, Baltic grey seals establish their nurseries under the iced-over sea in winter; this is their most southerly location in the world. The rarer ringed seal is occasionally seen.

== Human settlements ==
Slītere protects a large portion of the Līvõd Rãnda - the Livonian Coast, featuring Livonian villages. See Cape Kolka and villages Vaide, Saunags, Pitrags.

== Gallery ==
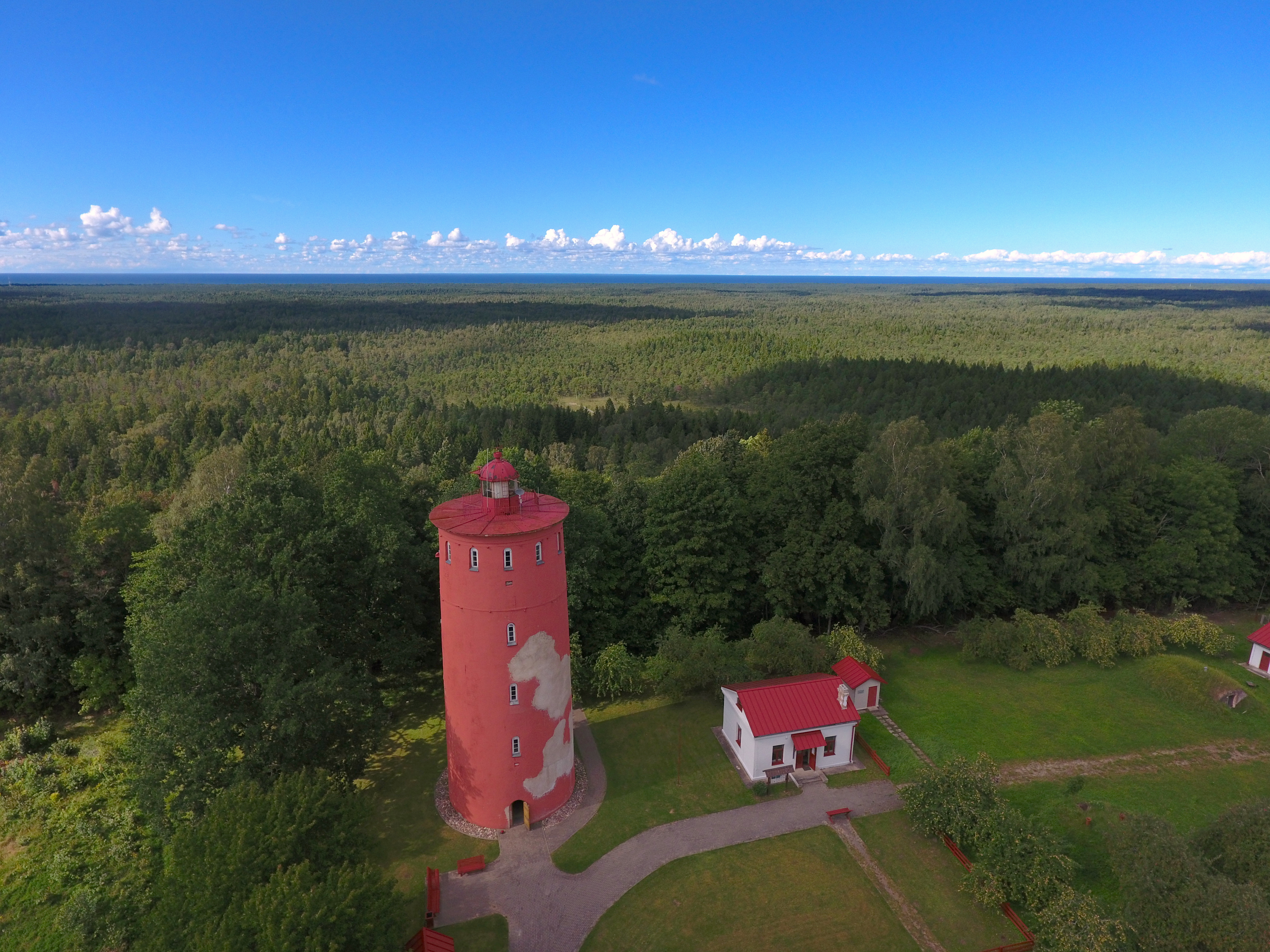
Slīteres lighthouse

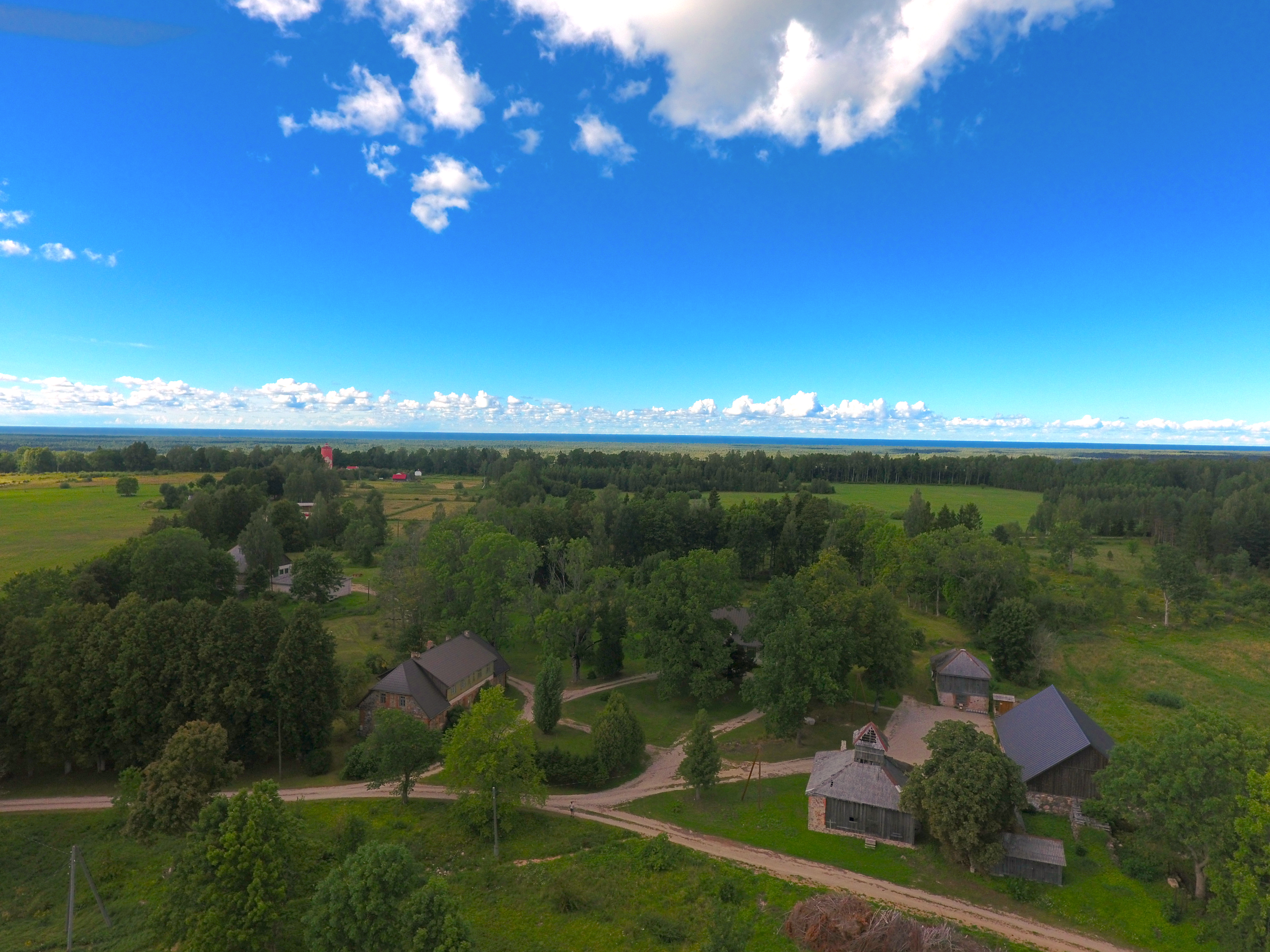
Houses with the Slīteres lighthouse in the background

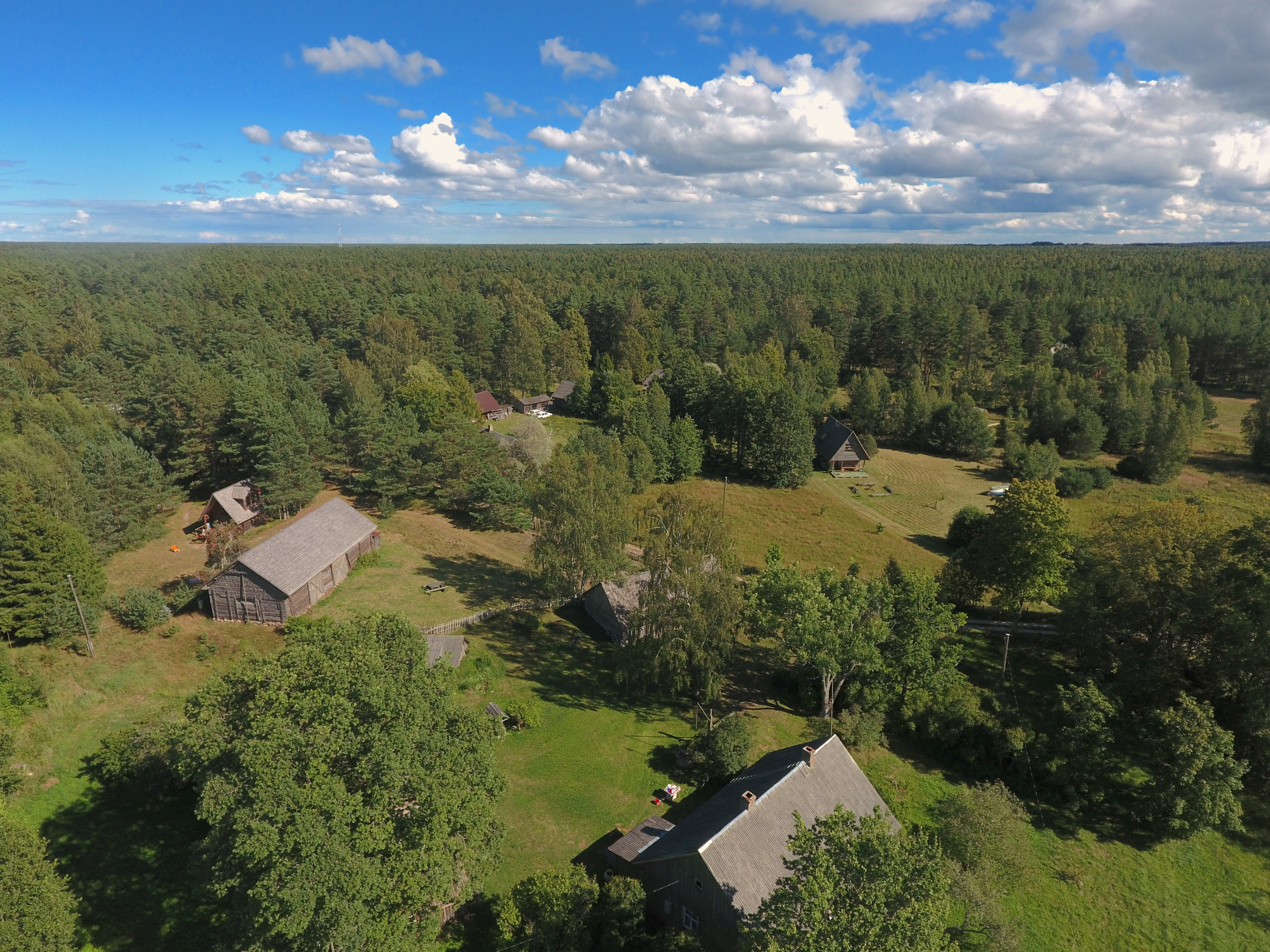
Košrags village, northwestern coast (Irbe strait)

== See also ==
- Livonian Coast
- List of national parks in the Baltics
