= Pitrags =

Village in Latvia

Pitrags Livonian: Pitrõg
- Village
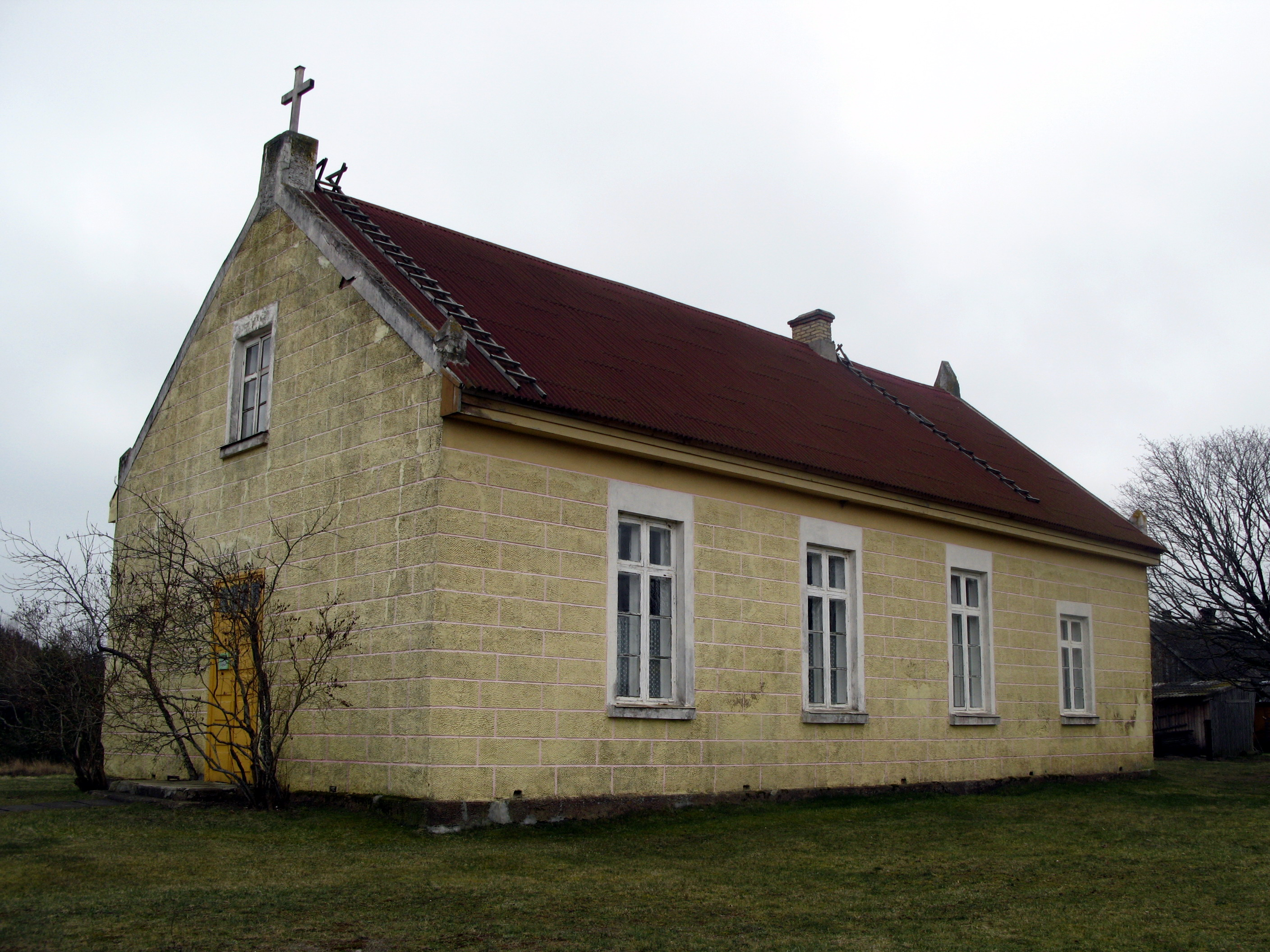
- Pitrags Baptist Church

- Location in Latvia
- Coordinates: 57°42′15″N 22°23′14″E
- Country: Latvia
- Municipality: Talsi Municipality
- Parish: Kolka Parish
- First mentioned: 1582
- Elevation: 16 ft (5 m)

Population (2015)
  - Total: 39
- Time zone: UTC+2 (EET)
  - Summer (DST): UTC+3 (EEST)
- Postal code: LV-3275 Kolka

Pitrags (Livonian: Pitrõg) is a village situated in Kolka Parish, Talsi Municipality, in the Courland region of Latvia, at the mouth of the river Pitraga. It is one of twelve Livonian villages on the Līvõd rānda - the Livonian Coast.

It was founded in the Middle Ages by several brothers who arrived from Saaremaa and settled there. For many years, due to its geographical location on the river, Pitrags was a regional centre of shipbuilding, providing small timber fishing boats for locals and the nearby villages of Saunags and Vaide. During the Soviet period a large fish-smoking plant was located here (closed down in mid-1990s and now converted into a private residence). There is also a small local church and cemetery. Along the dunes runs the site of a narrow gauge railway, an extension of the military railway built to nearby Mazirbe during World War I. The railway was decommissioned in the 1960s, several years after a new strategic wide dirt road was built by the Soviet Army (several years ago this road was asphalted using EU funds).

On February 4, 1992, the Latvian government created a protected cultural and historic territory called Līvõd Rānda - the Livonian Coast - which includes all 12 of the Livonian villages: Lūžņa (Livonian: Lūž), Miķeļtornis (Pizā), Lielirbe (Īra), Jaunciems (Ūžkilā), Sīkrags (Sīkrõg), Mazirbe (Irē), Košrags (Kuoštrõg), Saunags (Sǟnag), Vaide (Vaid), Kolka (Kūolka), Pitrags (Pitrõg), and Melnsils (Mustānum).

The Latvian government discourages settlement of ethnic Latvians and other non-Livonians in this area and prohibits alterations to historic village sites. Also, it is prohibited for anyone to start a hotel, restaurant, or other public establishment which might adversely influence the Livonian culture or draw outsiders into the area.

== Notable people ==
Born in Pitrags:

- Marija Bertholde-Šaltjāre (1860–1938) — Livonian folklore scholar and presenter

== See also ==
- Livonian people
- Livonian Coast
