= Saunags =

Village in Latvia

Saunags Livonian: Sǟnag Saunaga, Saunaga Ciems, Saunaguciems
- Village
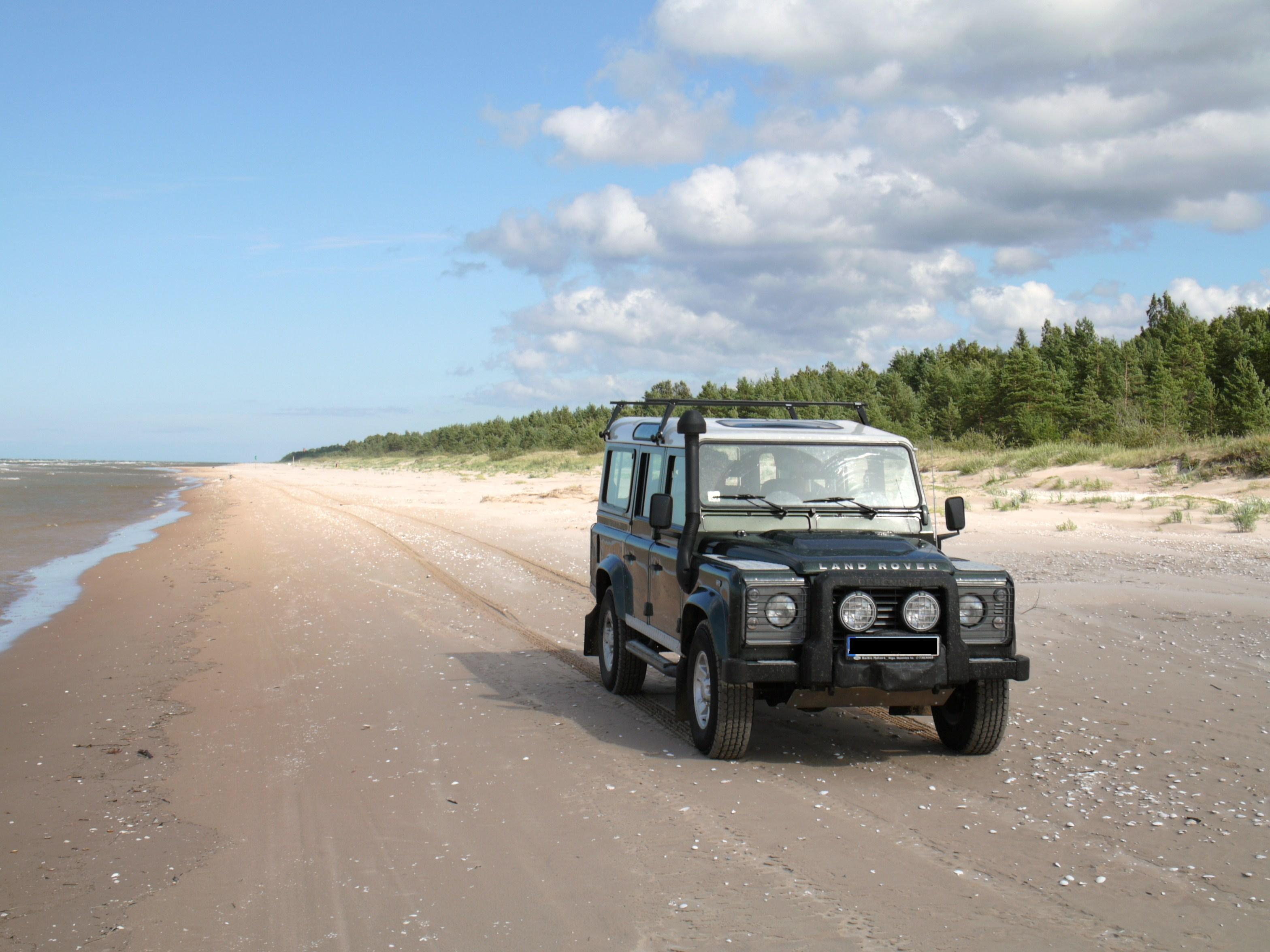
- Saunags beach

- Location in Latvia
- Coordinates: 57°43′00″N 22°25′00″E
- Country: Latvia
- Municipality: Talsi Municipality
- Parish: Kolka Parish
- First mentioned: 1310
- Elevation: 16 ft (5 m)

Population (2015)
  - Total: 15
- Time zone: UTC+2 (EET)
  - Summer (DST): UTC+3 (EEST)
- Postal code: LV-3275 Kolka

Saunags (Livonian: Sǟnag) is a populated place in Kolka Parish, Talsi Municipality, Latvia, located 10 kilometres (6 mi) from the Cape Kolka, within the borders of Slītere National Park. The name derived from Livonian Sǟnag – pike perch (Sander), a local fish. First mentioned in documents in 1310, Saunags is the oldest of the twelve Livonian villages along the Livonian Coast. The settlement comprises two parts — Saunags and Dižsaunags (Great Saunags), the latter being the older and better preserved. Located on the shore of the Baltic Sea, the village was historically inhabited by the Livonian people.

== History and local landmarks ==
Saunags is located at the same latitude as Gothenburg (Sweden) and the same longitude as Turku (Finland), both of which were important ancient regional trading and cultural centers. Although remote and sparsely populated, this coastal area held strategic importance in many wars due to its proximity to the Irbe Strait, the main sea route to Riga. As a result, the nearby seabed is scattered with shipwrecks dating from medieval times to the modern era, a testament to many past battles. During the Crimean War the British navy landed and burned down a military outpost of the Russian Empire here. During the First World War the Russian navy placed a large number of naval mines offshore, the largest such emplacement at that point in Baltic Sea history. This led to many German ships being destroyed here. During the Second World War, German guns located further south at the Livonian coast and opposite at Saaremaa island controlled the Irbe Strait.

After World War II, this area became part of the Soviet western border. Remnants of that period include a Soviet border guards tower (only foundation remain), the base of a projector light, and a small security house.

An old road runs behind the dunes, parallel to the coast, connecting Dižsaunags with the former lighthouse (now serving as the Saunagciema navigational sign after its light was dismantled) in the direction of Vaide. Along this route lie the Akacijas estate and several abandoned German and Soviet military bunkers. During World War II and in the years that followed, this narrow road served as a military supply route for Soviet border guards and for coast guards maintaining the lighthouse. A coastal narrow gauge railway was once planned here to link Pitrags and Mazirbe, but construction was abandoned during World War I. Today, this historic forest road is still used by local residents.

According to local legend, a Medieval burial ground lies on the outskirts of the village in the direction of Vaide. However, archaeological excavations carried out by University of Latvia in 2012 uncovered no human burials (only those of pets). Nearby are the ruins of the first Soviet military base in the area, constructed by troops of the Baltic Military District soon after World War II.

Although situated in a coastal environment, Saunags is home to a very large lime tree on the Niglini estate and a group of impressive black alder (Alnus glutinosa) trees on the Kalnbunkas estate. According to a Latvian registry listing all great or largest trees, Saunags is the only location with two species of large trees in one place.

The village can be accessed by car from the main asphalted road or via the old forest road connecting Saunags with Vaide and Pitrags. There are signs on the forest road marking the borders of Saunags. There is a bus stop on the Riga-Mazirbe route. Also, there are biking and hiking routes passing Saunags both on the coast and via forest road.

== Former and present landowners ==
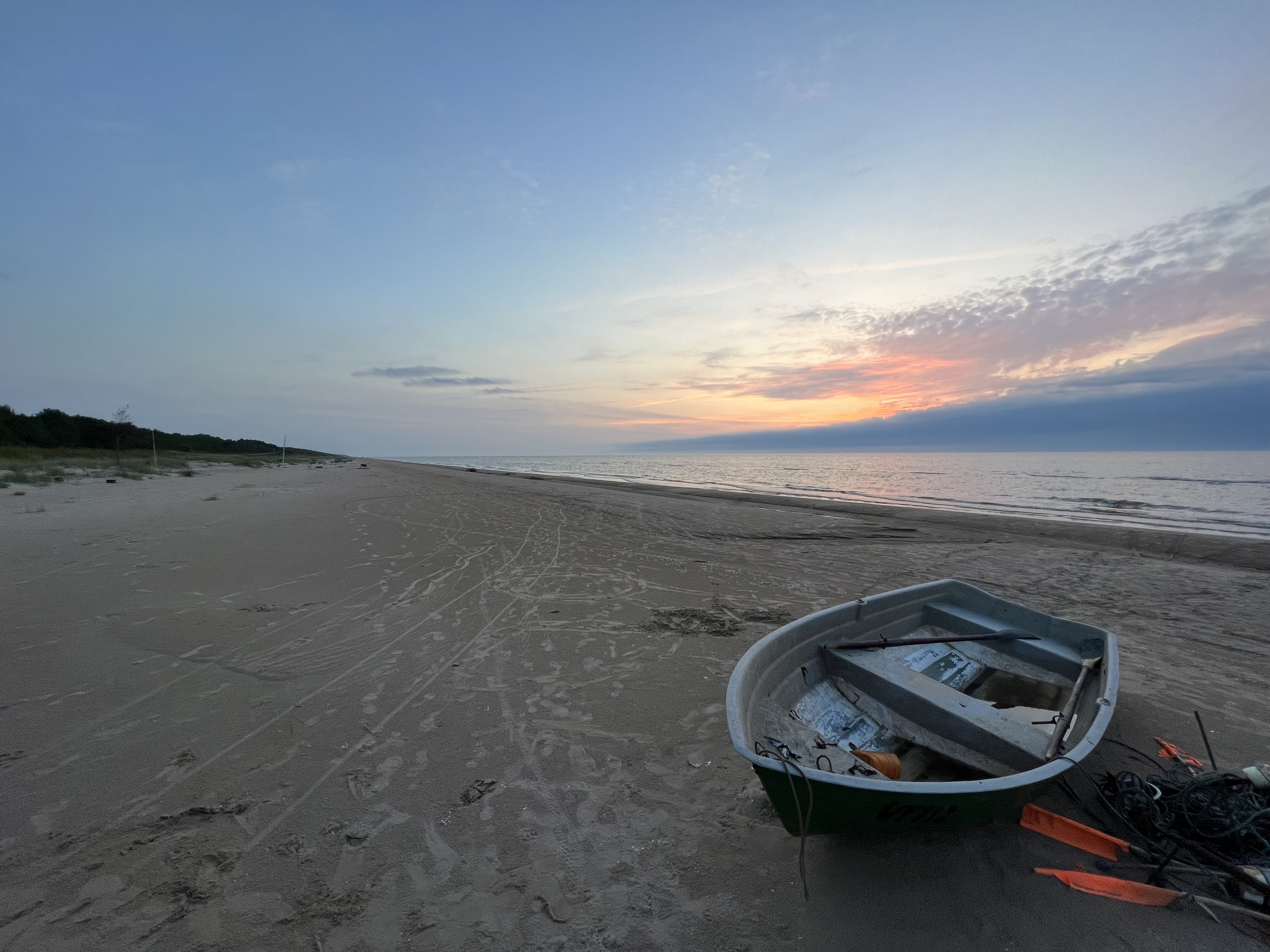
Fishing boat on the beach in Saunags

For many centuries until 1918, most of the land in this area, as well as the neighboring regions, belonged to the Baron Osten-Sacken family, a prominent Baltic-German noble dynasty. Their primary residence was Dundaga Castle (formerly known as Dundagen). After 1905 upraising local fishermen were gradually allowed to acquire land plots and their houses from the baron.

In 1731, the Dundaga manor book recorded three estates in Saunags: Buncke Pritiz (present-day Kalnbunkas), Melcke Ans (Niglini), and Walke Angeck (Valkas). According to local elders, Buncke Pritiz is likely the first and oldest settlement on the entire Livonian Coast. This belief is supported by the presence of some of the area’s oldest trees and by the estate’s location at one of the highest points in the historic village. A nearby forest clearing (now part of the Niglini estate), situated between Jaunpakalni’s sauna building and Akacijas, served for centuries as a central gathering place for local Livonian celebrations. Over the past 20–30 years, however, the clearing has gradually become overgrown with trees. In the 19th century, a fourth estate, Kruhming (now Krumini), was established.

In the past, Saunags was primarily inhabited by fishermen and farmers. Today, many of its historic wooden properties are used as summer houses (or dachas). The Akacijas estate (formerly Rupnieki) was once home to a local store as well as a fish processing and salting plant owned by Kārlis Tilmanis, whose brand became one of the best-known names in canned fish in Latvia between the two World Wars. Some members of Tilmanis family fled to Sweden by fishing boat in 1945. Of the facilities, only the dune-embedded ice storage and the remains of a wooden pier survive.

Other large estates in the area include Jaunpakalni (incorporating the former Pakalni, Kalnbunkas, and part of Niglini), as well as Krumini and Niglini. The Jaunpakalni estate also hosts a small private ethnographic museum featuring, inter alia, the restored old fishing boat “Pakalni”, which was used in local waters for over 50 years (viewings available by appointment only).

Historically, the former fishermen’s barn (where chandlery was stored) and the winter repair wharf stood symmetrically on either side of Kalnbunkas’ private seashore access road: the barn to the right and the wharf to the left (facing the sea). Today, only the foundations remain, but there are plans to reconstruct one of the buildings as a family and village gathering place, as well as to rebuild the timber pier on the coast.

== 700th anniversary ==
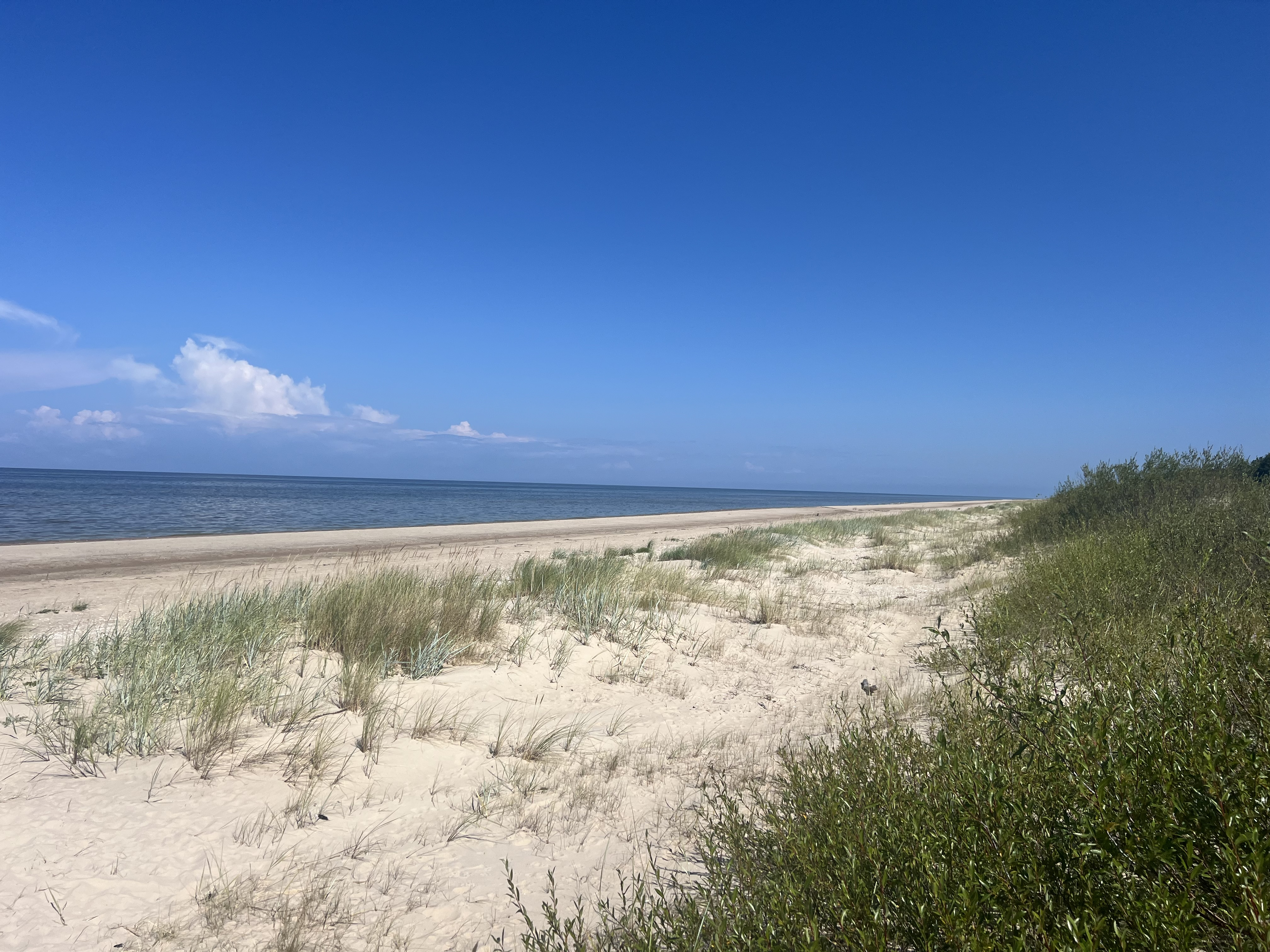
Beach in Saunags

In 2010, Saunags celebrated its 700th anniversary, marking the first documented mention of the village in 1310. To commemorate this milestone, some local summer residents retraced historic Livonian sea routes aboard the motor yacht “ Kolka”, sailing from Riga via Ruhnu and Saaremaa islands to Saunags, where they disembarked from an anchored boat. A memorial sign reading “DIŽSAUNAGS” has been placed atop a sand dune between the two access roads leading to the beach.
