= Kolka Lighthouse =

Lighthouse in Latvia

Kolka Lighthouse Kolkas bāka
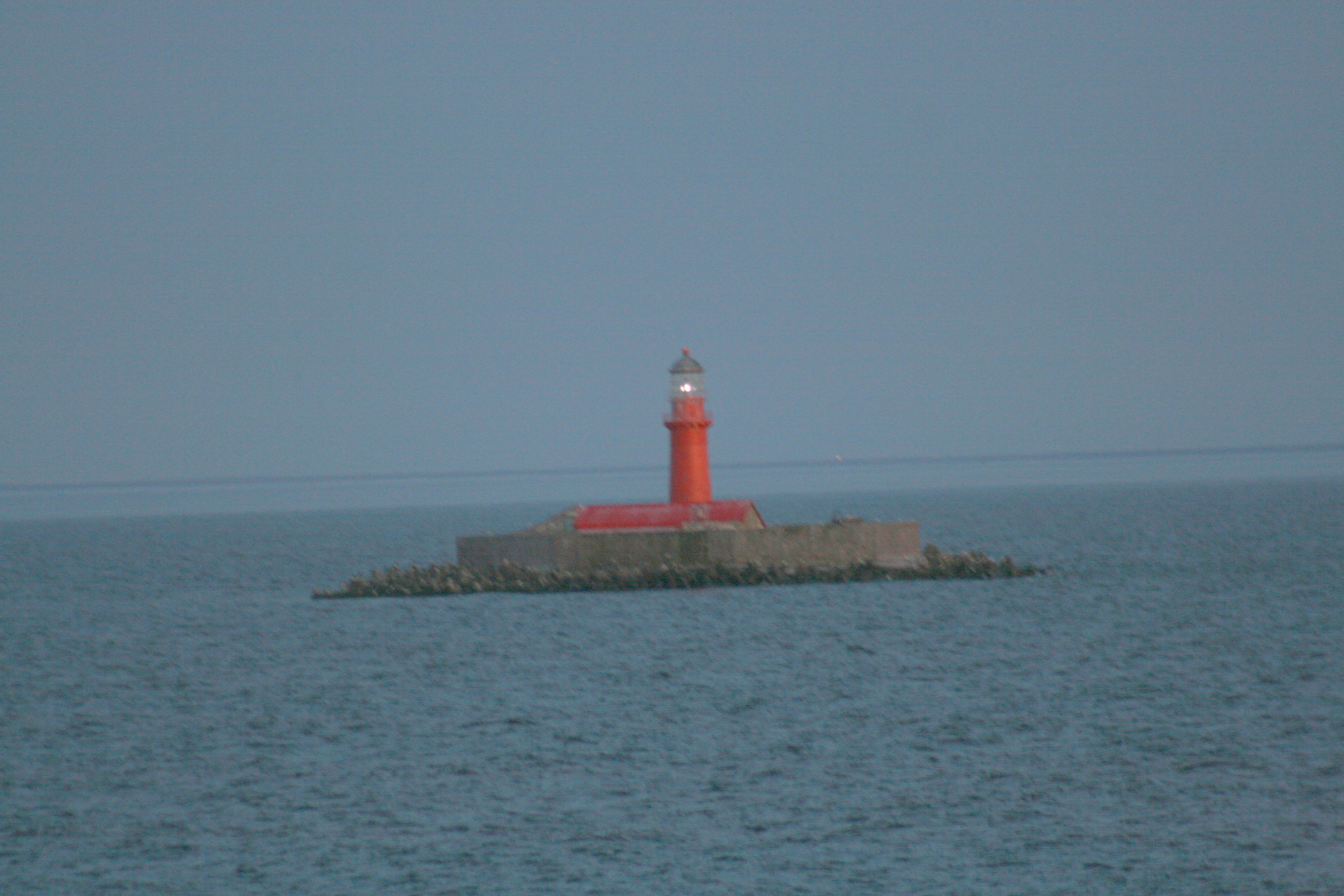
- Location: Irbe Strait, Latvia
- Coordinates: 57.80238°N 22.63462°E

Tower
- Constructed: 1875
- Foundation: 1873
- Construction: cast iron
- Automated: 1979
- Height: 21 metres (69 ft)
- Shape: octagonal seawalled island with red tower
- Markings: red tower
- Heritage: National industrial monument

Light
- First lit: 1884
- Focal height: 20 metres (66 ft)
- Range: 9.3 nautical miles (17.2 km; 10.7 mi)
- Characteristic: Fl(2) W 10s
- Latvia no.: UZ-410

Kolka Lighthouse (Latvian: Kolkas bāka) is a lighthouse located in Irbe Strait, 5.2 kilometres (3.2 mi) off the Latvian coast on a specially created artificial island. The lighthouse guides ships around the dangerous Cape Kolka, at the eastern entrance to the Irbe Strait from the Gulf of Rīga.

== History ==
A pair of range lights was built on the point of the cape in 1818 to guide ships around the offshore shoals. These proved inadequate so a lightship station was established in 1858. A temporary wooden lighthouse was lit offshore in 1875, well before completion of the permanent iron tower, which was built in Saint Petersburg and delivered by sea in parts.

Originally the artificial island was built closer to the coast, but due to damage to Kolka beach, the Cape Kolka is constantly being washed out. The island was built in the winters 1873–1875 by bringing big stones from the coast via ice road. The area of the island is about 2000 square meters. Historical names are Domesnäs, Domes Ness or Домеснес.

== See also ==
- List of lighthouses in Latvia
