= Uļi Kīnkamäg =

Livonian nationalist figure

Uļi Kīnkamäg (Latvian: Uļi Kīnkamegs, real name Uldriķis Kāpbergs; March 25 1869, born in Miķeļtornis – June 01 1932, died in Ventspils) was a Livonian nationalist and religious zealot. He was known for not accepting Latvian rule over Livonians and for this he got the nickname "King of Livs". His poems were published in the journal Līvli . In the 1920s, the Latvian police arrested him because he refused to pay his taxes. He died in Ventspils prison in 1932, and was buried in Miķeļtornis.
