= Kolka Parish =

Parish of Latvia

- parish of Latvia
- Flag Coat of arms

- Coordinates: 57°41′22″N 22°24′16″E
- Country: Latvia

Population (1 January 2026)
  - Total: 671
- Time zone: Eastern European Time
- Postal codes: LV-3264, LV-3275

Kolka parish (Latvian: Kolkas pagasts, Livonian: Kūolka pagāst) is an administrative unit of Talsi Municipality in the Courland region of Latvia.

== Villages of Kolka parish ==
- Kolka - parish administrative center
- Košrags
- Mazirbe
- Pitrags
- Saunags
- Sīkrags
- Uši
- Vaide
