= Melnsils =

Village in Latvia

Melnsils Livonian: Mustānum
- Village
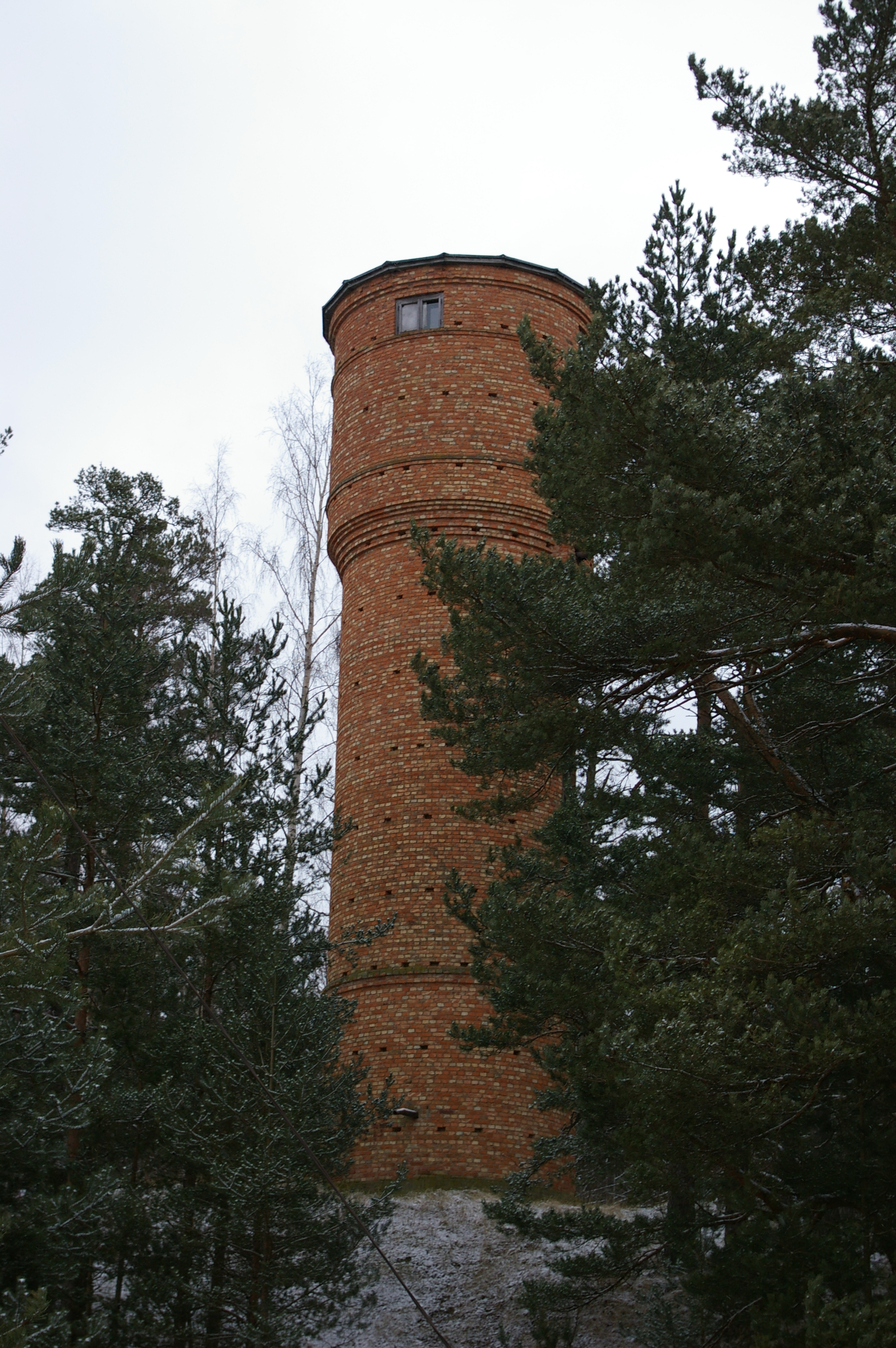
- Melnsils water tower.

- Location in Latvia
- Coordinates: 57°39′09.4″N 22°34′25.0″E
- Country: Latvia
- Municipality: Talsi Municipality
- Parish: Roja Parish
- Elevation: 43 ft (13 m)

Population (2015)
  - Total: 164
- Time zone: UTC+2 (EET)
  - Summer (DST): UTC+3 (EEST)
- Postal code: LV-3276 Melnsils

Melnsils (Livonian: Mustānum) is a small village in Roja Parish, Talsi Municipality in the Courland region of Latvia. It is one of twelve Livonian villages on the Līvõd rānda - the Livonian Coast.

== Melnsils camping ==
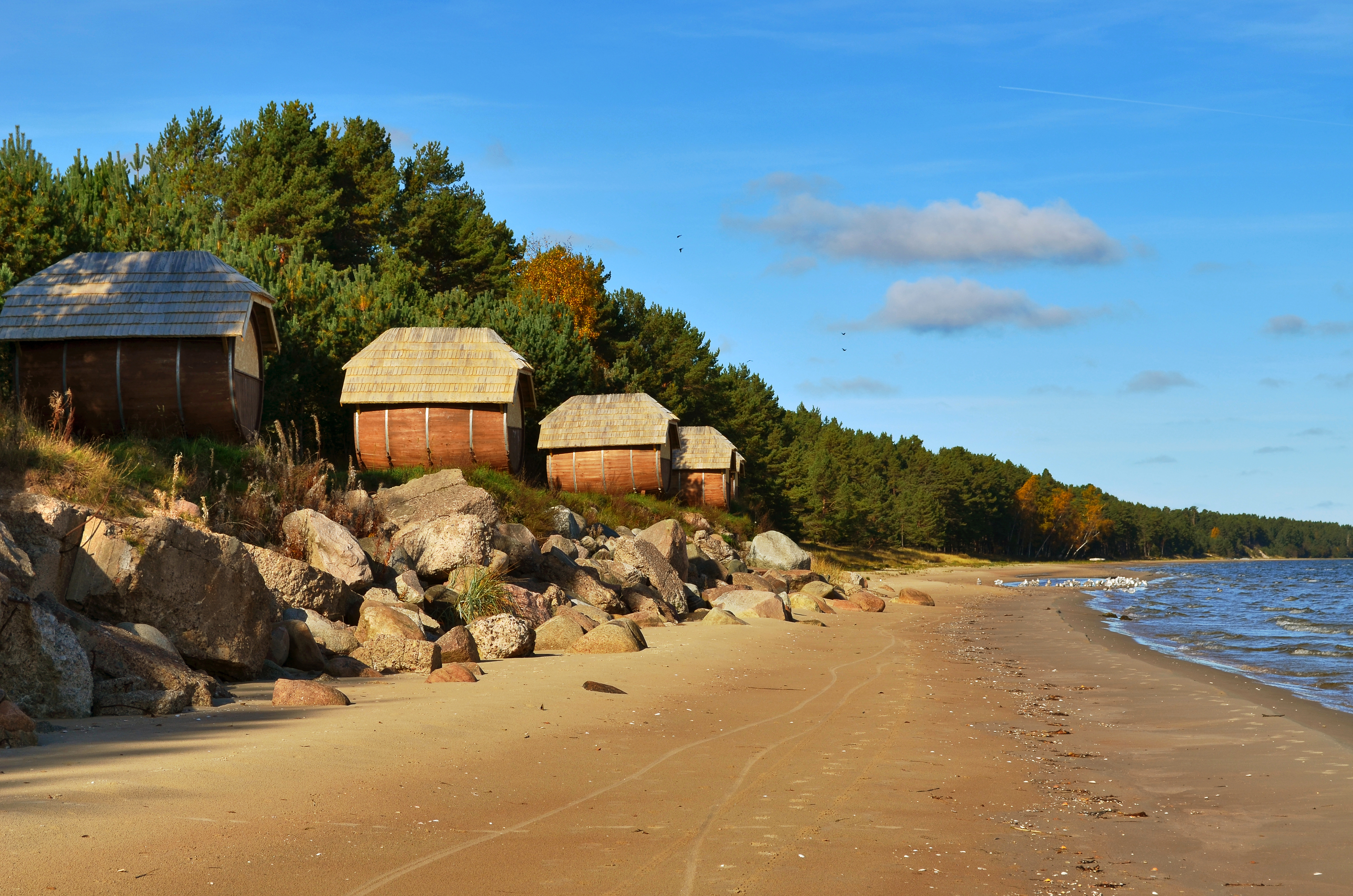
Melnsils camping site near sea coast

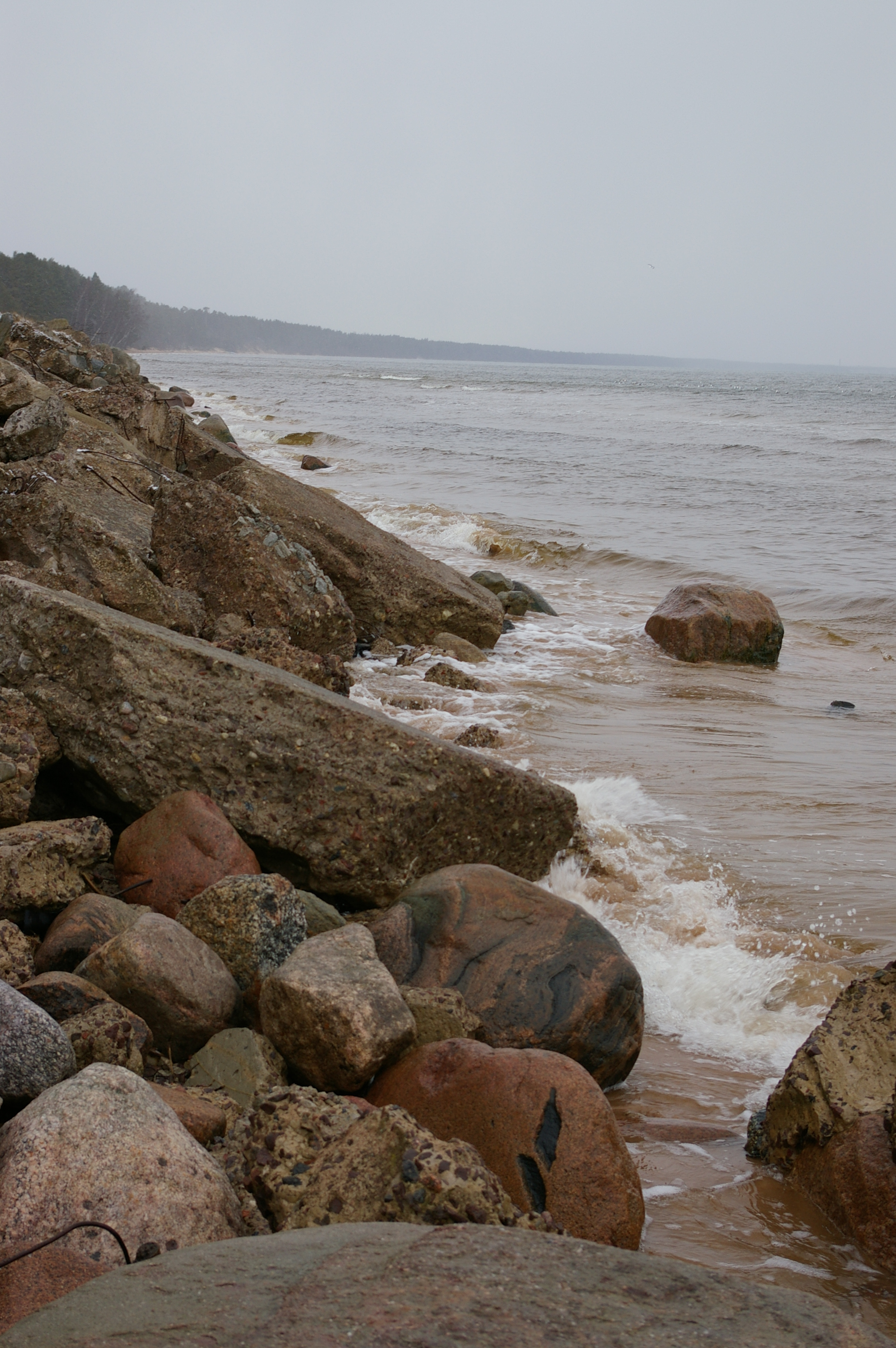
Melnsils coastline near camp area

Melnsils camping site is located right by the sea, just 10 km away from Kolka, near the Slītere National Park, the sea-cliffs, and fascinating walking paths in the woods. It is located about 1 km from the highway P131.

Melnsils camping site is ideal for recreational activities and organization of sports events for up to 300 persons.

== Climate ==
The continental climate prevails in the area. The annual average temperature is 6 °C. The warmest month is August, when the average temperature is 17 °C, and the coldest is January, with -4 °C.

== See also ==
- Slītere National Park
- Livonian Coast
- Livonian people
