= Mazirbe =

Village in Latvia

Mazirbe Livonian: Irē
- Village
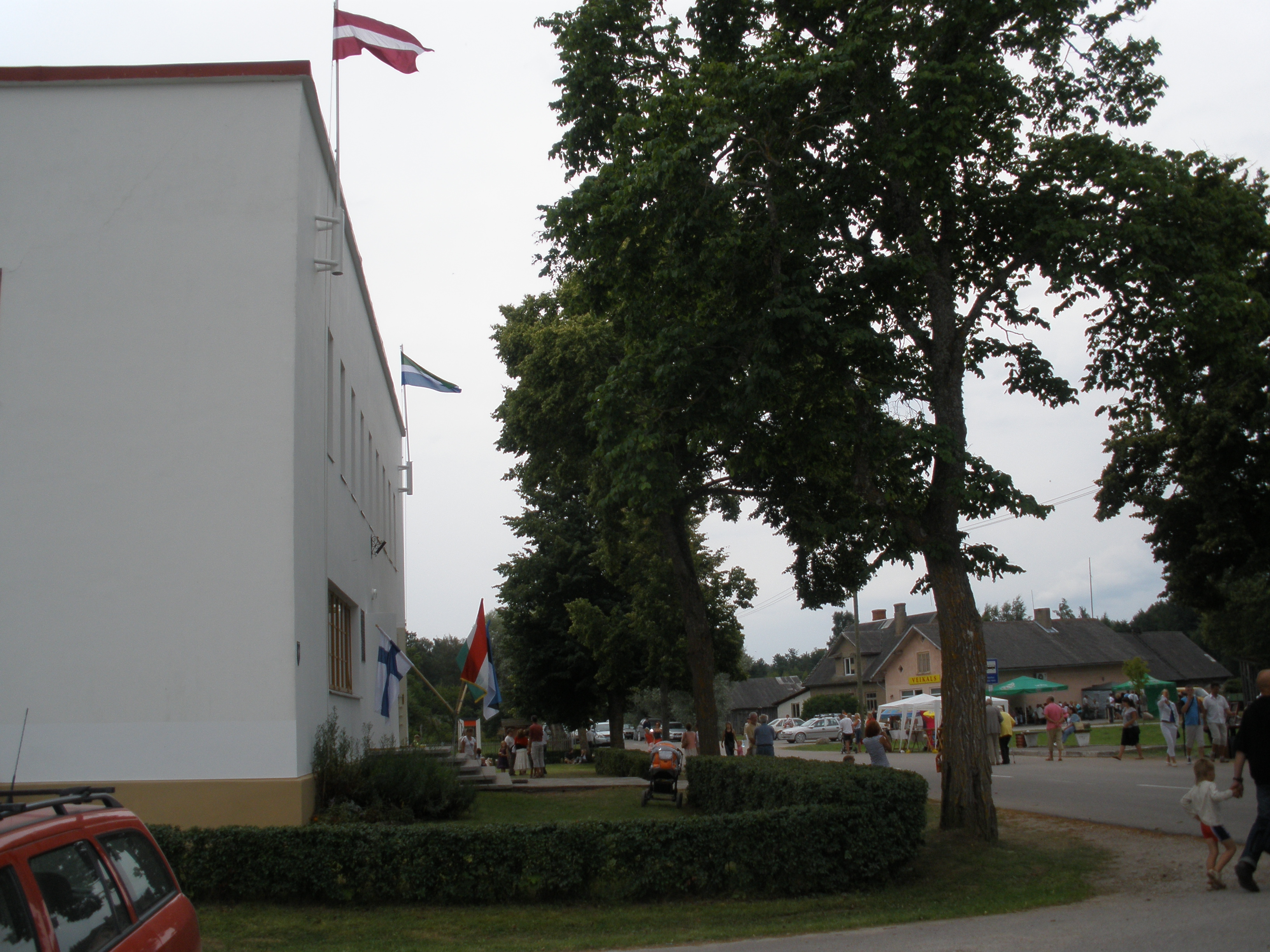
- Livonian culture centre in Mazirbe with flags on display during annual meeting.
- Motto: Cultural capital of the Livonians.
- Location in Latvia
- Coordinates: 57°41′N 22°19′E
- Country: Latvia
- Municipality: Talsi Municipality
- Parish: Kolka Parish
- Elevation: 13 ft (4 m)

Population (2005)
  - Total: 134
- Time zone: UTC+2 (EET)
  - Summer (DST): UTC+3 (EEST)
- Postal code: LV-3273 Mazirbe

Mazirbe (Livonian: Irē or Piški Īra, German: Klein-Irben) is a village place in Kolka Parish, Talsi Municipality, Latvia 18 km southwest of Kolka. It is one of twelve Livonian villages on Līvõd rānda - the Livonian Coast. Mazirbe is the cultural capital of the Livonians.

The flag of the Livonians has flown over the Livonian House of the People (Latvian: Lībiešu tautas nams or Līvu tautas nams, Livonian: Līvõd rovkuodā), a cultural centre dating from 1938, built in the heart of the village with the support of linguistic cousins in Hungary, Finland and Estonia. Inside is a small museum showing photos of past generations of Livonians. On the first Sunday of August there is a Livonian gathering here, culminating in a procession to the beach where a wreath is cast into the sea in remembrance of fishermen who have met watery deaths. A camp for young people where only Livonian is spoken is held for a week beforehand. The Mazirbe plague stone is a unique feature of the village.

The name of the village in both Livonian and Latvian translates to 'Small Irbe/Irā', as opposed to Lielirbe or 'Great Irbe/Irā'.

== See also ==
- Livonian people
