= Livonians =

Ethnic group in the Baltics

līvlizt
- Flag of the Livonians

Total population
- c. 432–616

Regions with significant populations
- Latvia (Livonian Coast)
- Latvia: 166 (2021)
- Ukraine: 235 (2002)
- Estonia: 15 (2021)
- Russia: 7 (2002)

Languages
- Livonian, Latvian, historically Russian and German

Religion
- Lutheranism

Related ethnic groups
- Other Baltic Finns; Especially Finns, Estonians, Setos, Võros, Votians, Vepsians and Izhorians

The Livonians, or Livs, are one of the Finnic peoples who are indigenous to the Livonian Coast, in northwestern Latvia and southwestern Estonia. Livonians historically spoke Livonian, a Finnic language closely related to Estonian and Finnish. It was believed that the last person to have learned and spoken Livonian as a mother tongue, Grizelda Kristiņa, died in 2013. In 2020, however, it was reported that newborn Kuldi Medne had become the only living person who speaks Livonian as their first language. As of 2010, there were approximately 30 people who had learned it as a second language.

Historical, social and economic factors, together with an ethnically dispersed population, have resulted in the decline of Livonian identity, with only a small group surviving in the 21st century. In 2011, there were 250 people who claimed Livonian ethnicity in Latvia.

== History ==
=== Prehistory ===
The exact date of migration of Livonians to the region has been disputed. "The Livonians claim to have inhabited their present homeland for over 5,000 years." "The Finnic tribes were pushed into the coastal regions by the Slav migrations of the sixth and seventh centuries AD."

=== The Middle Ages ===
Baltic tribes in 1200 – the Livonians inhabited the area north of the Balts, north of the Daugava River and around Cape Kolka in Courland.

Historically, the Livonians lived in two separate areas of Latvia, one group in Livonia and another on the northern coast of Courland. The latter were referred as Curonians, together with the Balts living there. The Livonians referred to themselves as rāndalist 'coast dwellers' and supported themselves mainly by fishing, but also by agriculture and animal husbandry. Since they controlled an important trade route, the Daugava River (Livonian: Vēna), their culture was highly developed through trade with the Gotlanders, Russians and Finns, and, from the end of the first millennium AD onwards, with the Germans, Swedes and Danes.

However, with the traders came missionaries from Western Europe who wanted to convert the pagan Livonians to Christianity. One of the first people to convert some Livonians to Christianity was the Danish archbishop Absalon, who supposedly built a church in the Livonian village today known as Kolka. In the 12th century, Germans invaded Livonia and established a base in Uexküll, known today as Ikšķile. Archbishop Hartwig II converted some Livonians in the surrounding area, including the local chieftain Caupo of Turaida, who later allied himself with the Germans.

After Meinhard, a German who was the first Bishop of Livonia, died in 1196, his place was taken by Berthold of Hanover. Berthold tried to convert the Livonians by force, launching two raids on Livonia. The first took place in 1196, but he was forced to retreat to Germany after being ambushed near Salaspils. He tried again in 1198, but this time he was killed by the Livonian soldier Ymaut.

Berthold was followed by Albert von Buxhövden, who forced the Livonian leaders at the mouth of the Daugava River to give him land to build a Christian settlement. Building started in 1201. From this settlement, the city of Riga grew.

When this did not immediately induce the Livonians, Estonians, and Baltic peoples in the hinterland to convert, a knightly order was formed, the Knights of the Sword, primarily consisting of Germans, to bring salvation to the pagans by force. In a campaign that was part of the wars known as the Livonian Crusade, these knights defeated, subdued and converted the Livonians. In 1208, Pope Innocent III declared that all Livonians had been converted to Christianity. Afterwards, they were obliged to join the Knights of the Sword as infantry during the wars against the Estonians and the Latvian tribes, which continued until 1217.

Before the German Conquests, Livonian-inhabited territory was divided into the lands of Daugava Livonians, Satezele, Turaida, Idumeja, and Metsepole.

During the Livonian Crusade, once prosperous Livonia was devastated, and whole regions were almost completely depopulated. This vacuum was filled by Latvian tribes – Curonians, Semigallians, Latgallians and Selonians – who started to move into the area around 1220, and continued to do so for at least thirty years. They settled mostly in the Daugava Valley; as a result, the Livonians in Eastern Livonia were cut off from those living on the peninsula of Curonia in the West.

Because of their defeat at the battle of Saule the Knights of the Sword eventually had to look for support from the much more powerful Teutonic Order, which up until then had been active primarily in Poland and Lithuania. Having been reorganised as a subdivision of the Teutonic Order and renamed the Livonian Order in 1237, the former Knights of the Sword finally overpowered the Curonians in 1267, and subsequently the Semigallians in 1290. From then on, most of Latvia remained under German control until the 16th century, with the city of Riga and several other cities existing as independent German-ruled bishoprics, while the Livonian Order ruled the rest of the land.

=== Under foreign powers (1558–1795) ===
In the middle of the 16th century, the Livonian Order and the independent bishoprics were in turmoil because of the growing influence of the Protestant Reformation. Seeing a chance in the resulting military weakness of the Order, Czar Ivan the Terrible of Russia invaded Livonia in 1558, seeking access to the Baltic Sea. However, Sweden and the Polish–Lithuanian Commonwealth entered the war as allies of the Livonian Order, resulting in almost a quarter of a century of war. The outcome of this Livonian War (1558–1582) was a Russian defeat, but also the dissolution of the Livonian Order. Livonia and south-eastern Latvia were claimed by the Polish–Lithuanian Commonwealth, while Curonia became an independent duchy (Courland), with Gotthard Kettler, the Livonian Order's last Grandmaster, as its first duke.

After only ten years of peace, a new series of wars between the Polish–Lithuanian Commonwealth and Sweden, which had claimed Estonia after the Livonian War, ravaged Livonia from 1592. Eventually, the Swedes were victorious. In 1629, they could finally call Livonia and the city of Riga their own. Under the 17th-century Swedish kings Gustav II Adolf and Charles XI, general elementary education was introduced, the Bible was translated in Estonian and Latvian, and a university was founded in Tartu in southern Estonia.

Although Sweden kept the Poles and the Danes at a distance, this could not be said of the Russians. In the Great Northern War (1700–1721), Czar Peter the Great utterly destroyed Sweden's pretensions to being a regional superpower. In the 1721 Treaty of Nystad, Estonia and Livonia, which had again been completely devastated after more than twenty years of war, were claimed by Russia. Curonia continued to be ruled by its dukes for another three-quarters of a century, but in 1795, that region also became a Russian possession as part of the Third Partition of Poland.

=== Assimilation and isolation (1795–1914) ===
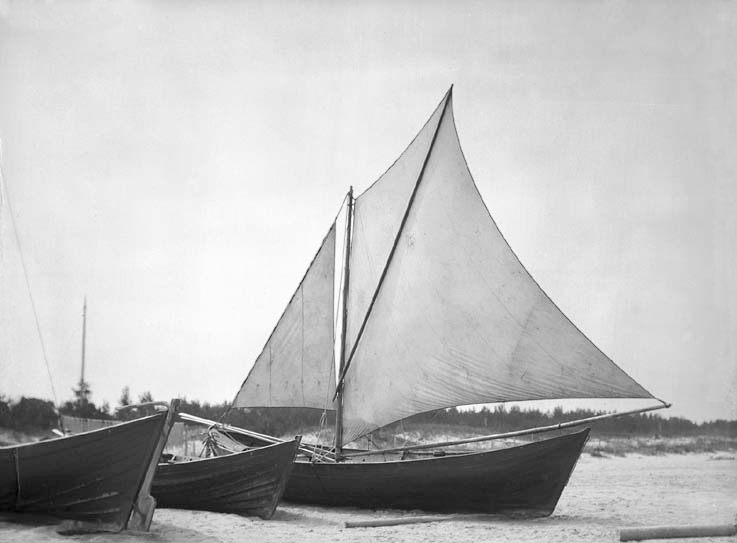
Lōja, Livonian fishing boat

Partly because of the recurring devastation of war and the resultant mingling of refugees, the Livonians of Livonia were eventually completely assimilated by the Latvians. The last remnant of this once vibrant nation was made up of several families living along the river Salaca (Livonian: Salatsi), but in the second half of the 19th century, the Livonian language and culture completely disappeared from the region known to this day as Livonia; the last known speaker of the eastern Livonian dialect died in 1864, though according to some reports, there were still some people in the early 20th century in the Polish area In the Latvian dialect spoken in Livonia, a large number of Livonian loanwords have survived, and other traces of Livonian can be found in many geographical names in the region.

In Curonia, the Livonian language and culture also came under heavy pressure, but here it retained a last foothold on the outermost tip of the Curonian Peninsula. Several factors made sure that in this area, known as Līvõd rānda, the Livonian Coast, Latvian culture was too weak to assimilate the Livonians. For one thing, the society of the Livonians living in this area was exclusively sea-oriented and based on fishing, while that of the Latvians in the interior was exclusively land-oriented and mostly agricultural. This meant there was not a lot of interaction between the two groups. Also, the Livonian Coast was separated from the interior of Curonia by dense forests and impassable marshlands, which made regular interaction even less likely. The people of the Livonian Coast had much closer ties to the inhabitants of the Estonian island of Saaremaa, across the Gulf of Riga to the north. In their isolated fishing villages, these Livonians kept to themselves for centuries. It was not until the 20th century that the outside world intruded on their quiet existence.

At the beginning of 20th century many local Livs converted to the Russian Orthodox faith. A new Russian Orthodox church was built in Kolka along with a grammar school nearby and navy school in Mazirbe. Many graduates in later years became sea captains first in the Russian Empire, and later in independent Latvia.

=== World War I ===
In 1914, Russia entered the First World War by attacking the Germans and the Austrians from the east, but soon it was pushed back in a series of devastating German victories, which eventually left almost the entire Baltic region in German hands. The Livonian Coast was occupied by the Germans in 1915. At their approach, many Livonians fled their homes, often never to return. Their main destinations were Estonia and inner parts of Latvia. The rest of the people were driven from their homes by the Germans and had to wait until 1919 before they were allowed to return.

The Russian defeat and the subsequent abdication of Czar Nicholas II opened the door for Vladimir Lenin and the communists to make a grab for power in Russia, leading to the establishment of the Soviet government in Russia in 1917. The Treaty of Brest-Litovsk the following year ended the war between Germany and Soviet Russia and left the Baltic region firmly in German hands. However, after the German capitulation in 1919, the Baltic peoples rose up and established the independent republics of Estonia, Latvia and Lithuania.

=== The interwar years ===
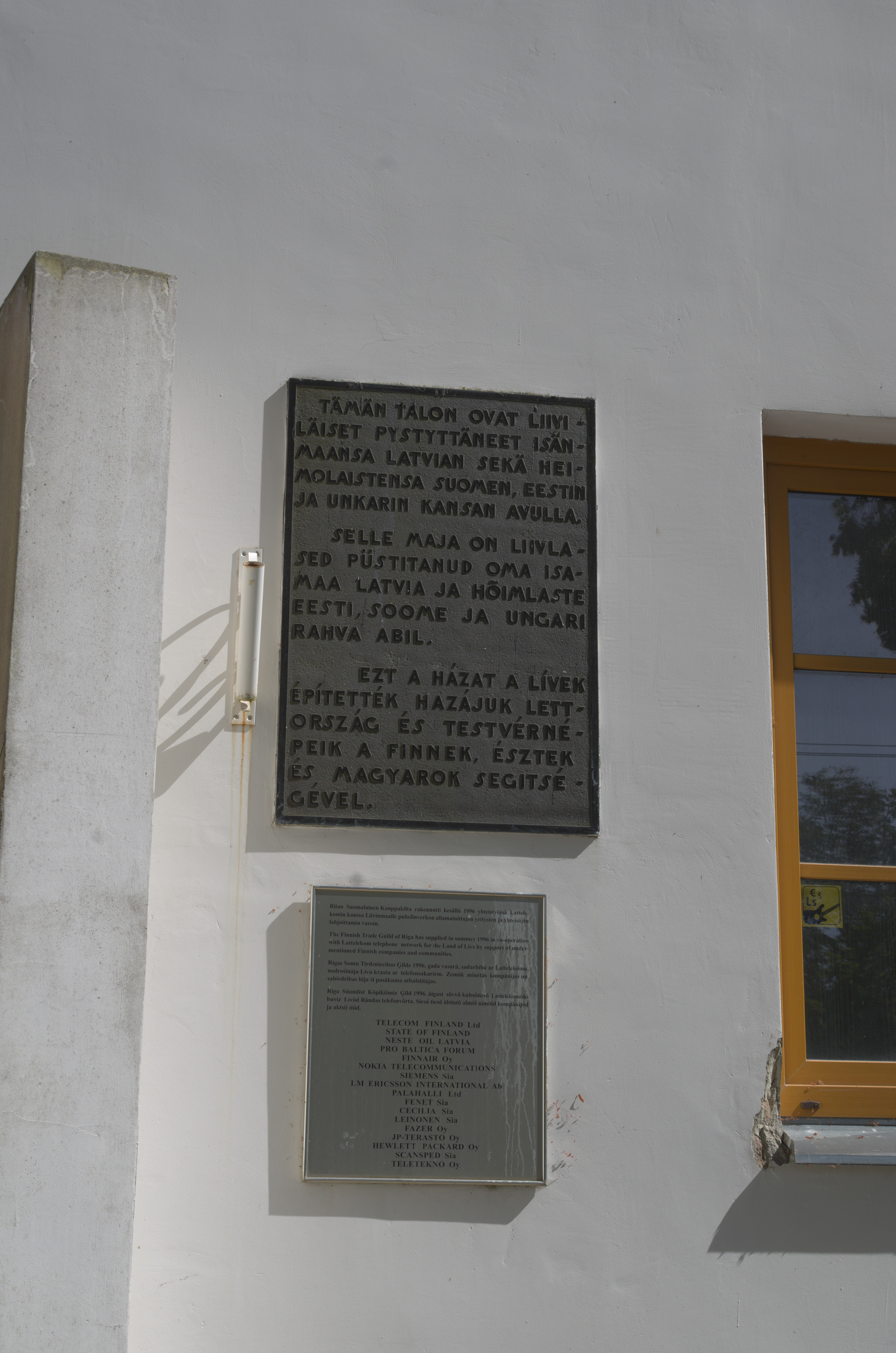
Plaques at the Livonian Community Centre in Mazirbe

The Livonian Coast became part of independent Latvia. Actions by the Latvian government during the interwar years towards supporting the Livonian minority has been seen as lacking or non-existent, with claims that the Latvian government did not see the topic of Livonian culture as important enough. Nevertheless, the Livonian language and culture experienced a revival between the two World Wars (beginning with the term of the Latvian president Jānis Čakste through the term of the last interwar president Kārlis Ulmanis). The clearest expression of this revival was the establishment on April 2, 1923 of the Livonian Society (Livonian: Līvõd Īt, Latvian: Līvu savienība), which considered itself the representative of the Livonian people. Also, a Livonian language choir was founded and Livonian song festivals were held along the entire Livonian Coast. Furthermore, a Livonian flag was adopted, with the colours green (for the forests), white (for the beaches) and blue (for the sea), and a division similar to the Latvian flag (three horizontal bars with the middle one-half as wide as the outer ones).

In 1923, the Latvian government prohibited the formation of an ethnic Livonian parish within the Lutheran Church. It did approve the introduction of the Livonian language as an optional subject in elementary schools in the villages of the Livonian Coast that same year. In the 1930s, the first Livonian language reader, poetry collections of several Livonian writers, and a monthly magazine in the Livonian language, called "Līvli" ("The Livonian") were published. Also, contact was made with related peoples such as the Estonians and the Finns — spurred by the Finnish promotion of closer ties with the kindred Baltic Finns — and in 1939, the Livonian Community Centre in Mazirbe (Livonian: Irē) was founded with subsidies from the Estonian and Finnish governments.

This cultural revival of the Interbellum years served to give the Livonian people for the first time a clear consciousness of their ethnic identity. Before, they had always referred to themselves as rāndalist ("coast dwellers") or kalāmīed ("fishermen"). From the 1920s and 1930s on, though, they began to call themselves līvõd, līvnikad, or līvlist ("Livonians").

=== The Second World War ===
In 1940, Latvia, like Estonia and Lithuania, was occupied by the Soviet Union. This occupation and the subsequent German invasion of 1941 ended all progress the Livonians had made in the preceding twenty years. All cultural expressions were prohibited and just like twenty years before, the inhabitants of the Livonian Coast were driven from their homes. Most of them spent the war years in Riga or western Latvia, but some fled across the Baltic Sea to Gotland. The Curonian Peninsula was one of the areas where the Germans held out until the general capitulation of May 9, 1945, which meant that often there was not a house left standing when the Livonians returned home after the war.

=== Repression by the Soviet Union ===
In the Soviet era, the Livonians were hard-hit by repressive measures from Moscow. For one thing, they were not allowed to sail far enough from shore to continue their fishery. For another, like the Estonians, Latvians, and Lithuanians, large numbers of them were deported to Siberia between 1945 and 1952, with a clear peak in 1949, when agriculture was collectivized in the Baltic states. Also, in 1955 a Soviet military base was constructed in the middle of the Livonian Coast. To accomplish this, some Livonians were forcibly relocated to villages farther from the coast. Subsequently, the western villages of the Livonian Coast had to be almost completely evacuated when the Soviet Union made its Baltic coastline (its western border) a "closed border area" of the Iron Curtain where no one was allowed to live.

Livonian culture was repressed during the Soviet period. For example, the Livonian Society was banned and the Livonian Community Centre expropriated and given to others. Within the Latvian SSR, the Livonians were not recognized as a separate ethnic group.

=== Modern situation ===
It was not until early the early 1970s that Livonian singers were allowed to found a choir named "Līvlist" ("The Livonians") in the western Latvian city of Ventspils. The 1980s, Soviet Premier Mikhail Gorbachev's policies of glasnost and perestroika opened the Iron Curtain, bringing change. In 1986, the Livonian Cultural Society was founded. It was later renamed the Livonian Union (Livonian: Līvõd Īt).

After the collapse of the Soviet Union in 1991, Latvia became an independent country again. In this new nation, Livonians were finally recognised as an indigenous ethnic minority, whose language and culture must be protected and advanced. All rights and possessions which had been taken away from them during the Soviet era were returned to them. For example, the old Livonian Community Centre in Mazirbe (Irē) was given back and transformed into a historical museum, called the House of the Livonian People. Also, the Livonian language was reintroduced in the elementary schools in Riga, Staicele, Ventspils, Dundaga and Kolka. The first research body dedicated to Livonian studies, the Livonian Institute at the University of Latvia was established in 2018.

Furthermore, on February 4, 1992, the Latvian government created a cultural historic protected territory called Līvõd rānda – the Livonian Coast – which included all twelve of the Livonian villages: Lūžņa (Livonian: Lūž), Miķeļtornis (Pizā), Lielirbe (Īra), Jaunciems (Ūžkilā), Sīkrags (Sīkrõg), Mazirbe (Irē), Košrags (Kuoštrõg), Pitrags (Pitrõg), Saunags (Sǟnag), Vaide (Vaid), Kolka (Kūolka), and Melnsils (Mustānum). The Latvian government discourages settlement of ethnic Latvians and other non-Livonians in this area and prohibits alterations to historic village sites. Also, it is prohibited for anyone to start a hotel, restaurant, or other public establishment which might adversely influence the Livonian culture or draw outsiders into the area.

Today, many Latvians claim to have some Livonian ancestry. However, there are only 176 people in Latvia who identify themselves as Livonian. According to data from 1995, the Livonian language was spoken by no more than 30 people, of whom only nine were native speakers. An article published by the Foundation for Endangered Languages in 2007 stated that there were only 182 registered Livonians and a mere six native speakers. "The last Livonian", who had learned the Livonian language as a part of an unbroken chain of Livonian generations, was Viktors Bertholds (b. 1921). He was buried on 28 February 2009 in the Livonian village of Kolka in Courland.

The Livonian Dāvis Stalts was elected into the Latvian parliament, the Saeima in the 2011 Latvian parliamentary election. In 2018, after being re-elected to the Saeima, Janīna Kursīte-Pakule delivered her oath in Livonian before being asked to retake it in Latvian, which she did in the Livonian dialect of Latvian. In 2018, the Livonian Institute at the University of Latvia (Livonian: Lețmō Iļīzskūol Līvõd institūt) was established to promote research and awareness of the language. It is led by linguist and activist Valts Ernštreits.

In 2020, it was reported that newborn Kuldi Medne had become the only living person who speaks Livonian as their first language. Her parents are Livonian language revival activists Jānis Mednis and Renāte Medne. In October 2022, they published Kūldaläpš. Zeltabērns ('Golden Child'), a book in Livonian and Latvian for children and parents, with plans for subsequent books and an audio version. The Livonian language is being revived, with some 210 persons having some knowledge of the language at a A1 or A2 level as of 2011.

2023 was proclaimed as Livonian Heritage Year by the University of Latvia Livonian Institute in cooperation with the UNESCO Latvian National Commission and the Latvian National Cultural Center. Various events were held by individuals and institutions. In 2023, the first of 171 approved road signs in Latvia with Latvian and Livonian text were placed on the border of Talsi Municipality. During the 2023 Latvian Song and Dance Festival, for the first time in the history of the event, a song with Livonian lyrics was featured.

== Notable Livonians ==
- Caupo of Turaida (died 1217), chieftain of the Livonian people in the beginning of the 13th century
- Uļi Kīnkamäg (1869 in Miķeļtornis – 1932), nationalist
- Kōrli Stalte (1870 in Mazirbe – 1947), teacher, cantor and Livonian cultural activist
- Pētõr Damberg (1909 in Sīkrags – 1987), linguist, poet and educator
- Grizelda Kristiņa (1910 in Vaide – 2013), the last native Livonian speaker
- Edgar Vaalgamaa (1912 in Košrags – 2003), Lutheran pastor and translator
- Viktors Bertholds (1921 in Vaide – 2009), one of the last Livonian speakers

== See also ==
- Livonian cuisine
- "Min izāmō" (English: "My Fatherland"), the ethnic anthem of the Livonians
