= Irbe Strait =

Strait in Estonia and Latvia

Coordinates: 57°48′0″N 22°12′30″E

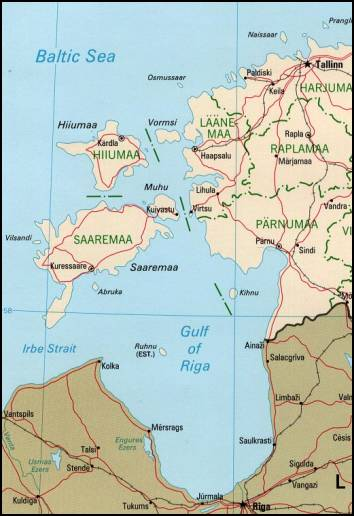
The Gulf of Riga, with Irbe Strait on the left of the map

Irbe Strait, also known as Irben Strait (Estonian: Kura kurk, Irbe väin, Latvian: Irbes jūras šaurums, Livonian: Sūr meŗ), forms the main exit out of the Gulf of Riga to the Baltic Sea, between the Sõrve Peninsula forming the southern end of the island Saaremaa in Estonia and Courland Peninsula in Latvia. It is 27 km (17 mi) wide at its narrowest point. A shipping channel has been dredged along its southern shore to allow larger ships to pass.

The strait is named after the Irbe River, which flows into it along the Livonian Coast in Latvia.

See also Saunags.
