= Livonian Coast =

Territory of Latvia

- Livonian: Līvõd rānda, Latvian: Lībiešu krasts
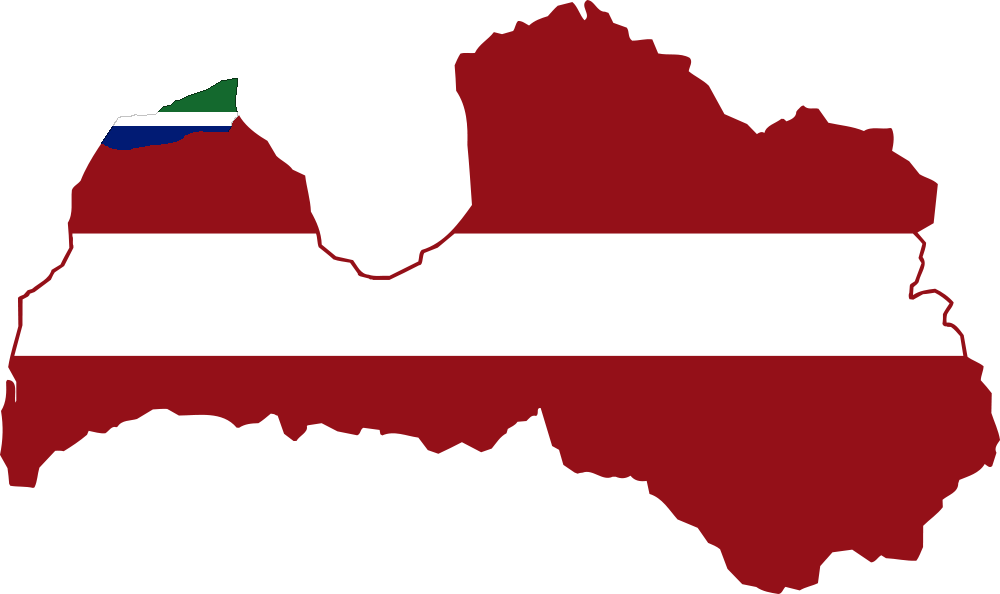
- Livonian Coast marked with Livonian flag colors on Latvia map.

- Location within Latvia
- Coordinates: 57°36′00″N 21°58′00″E
- Area: 28.500 ha (70.43 acres)
- Established: February 4, 1991; 35 years ago
- Operator: Slītere National Park

Livonian Coast (Livonian: Līvõd rānda; Latvian: Lībiešu krasts), also known as Livonia, is a culturally protected territory of Latvia that was historically inhabited by Livonian people. It is located in Northern Courland and encompasses twelve Livonian villages. The protected area is about 60 kilometers long.

== Protection ==
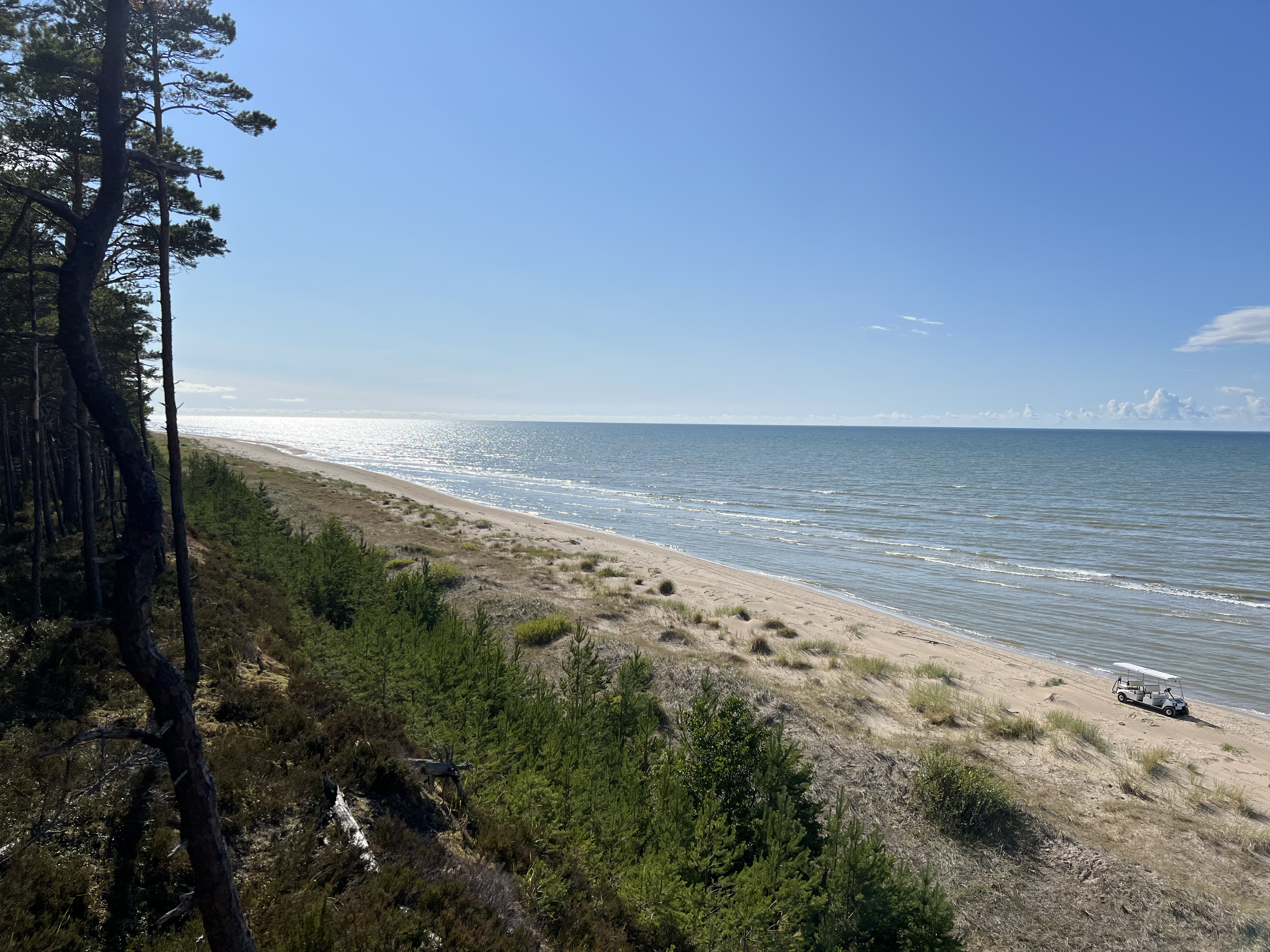
Panorama view of Livonian coast

On February 4, 1991, the Latvian government created a culturally protected territory called Līvõd rānda – the Livonian Coast – which included all twelve of the Livonian villages: Lūžņa (Livonian: Lūž), Miķeļtornis (Pizā), Lielirbe (Īra), Jaunciems (Ūžkilā), Sīkrags (Sīkrõg), Mazirbe (Irē), Košrags (Kuoštrõg), Saunags (Sǟnag), Vaide (Vaid), Kolka (Kūolka) (see also Cape Kolka), Pitrags (Pitrõg), and Melnsils (Mustānum). The Latvian government discourages new settlements in the area and prohibits alterations to historical village sites. Additionally, it restricts the establishment of hotels, restaurants, or other public businesses that could negatively impact Livonian culture or attract modern development to the region. However, several old fishermen’s and farmers’ houses have been converted into modern summerhouses by Latvia’s upper class, as well as by well-off descendants of local Livonian families. Among these are former presidents of Latvia, former prime ministers, ministers, politicians, CEOs, bankers, businessmen, artists, doctors, and others. The area is also home to prominent British, German, Russian, and Swedish residents, with the coast becoming increasingly popular among Lithuanians. The Livonian Coast is part of Slītere National Park.

== Local roads ==
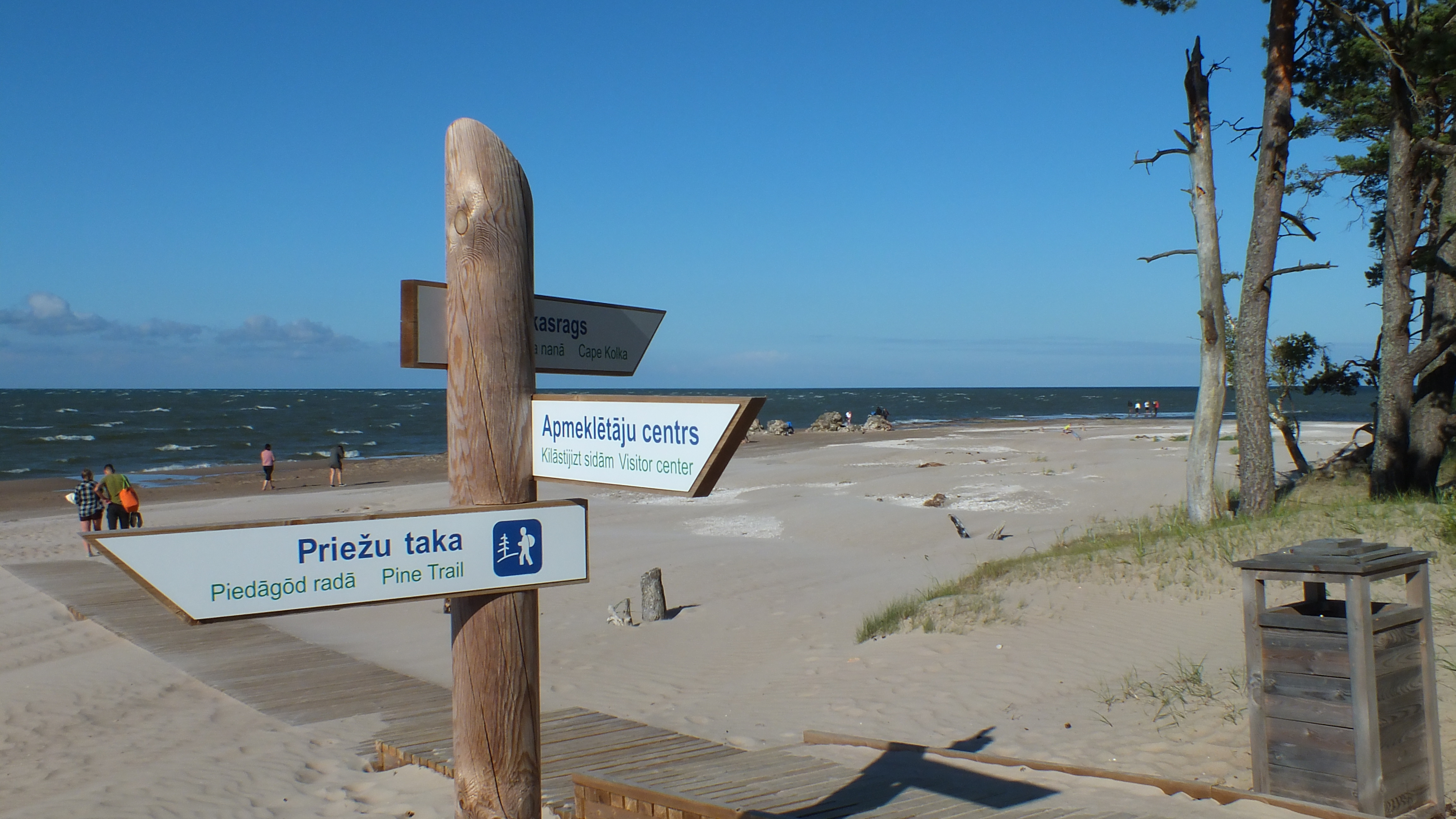
Trilingual signposts in Latvian, Livonian and English at the Livonian Coast

Until World War I these villages were connected only by small forest roads along the coast and were practically inaccessible from inland. Most deliveries were made by the sea and most villages had their own pier (remains of piers can still be seen in Saunags, Pitrags and Mazirbe; only Kolka pier is still in use). During World War I the German Army built a narrow-gauge railway behind the dunes to move ammunition and wood. The railway connected Pitrags, Mazirbe and Lielirbe with Dundaga, a small regional town. Earthworks were installed to extend railway from Pitrags to Saunags and Vaide, but the work was interrupted by moving front lines. Between the two wars, the railway was the main method for passenger transportation along the Livonian coast. After World War II, in 1950s the Soviet Army built a wide dirt road connecting all the villages and the railway become obsolete. The railway was closed completely in 1960s, but there are several straight sections of roads or passages which still can be seen behind the dunes in Saunags and Pitrags, and in forests in Mazirbe and Lielirbe. During 2009–2011 the dirt road was asphalted and modernised as part of EU funded Kolka-Ventspils road project. Several years ago replica Mazirbe railway station (original station is still standing now as a private house in Mazirbe) was re-created as part of narrow gauge railway line in Ventspils, along with a restored engine and carriages, and is now used as a tourist attraction.

== See also ==
- Cape Kolka
