= Lielirbe =

Village in Latvia

Lielirbe Livonian: Īra
- Village
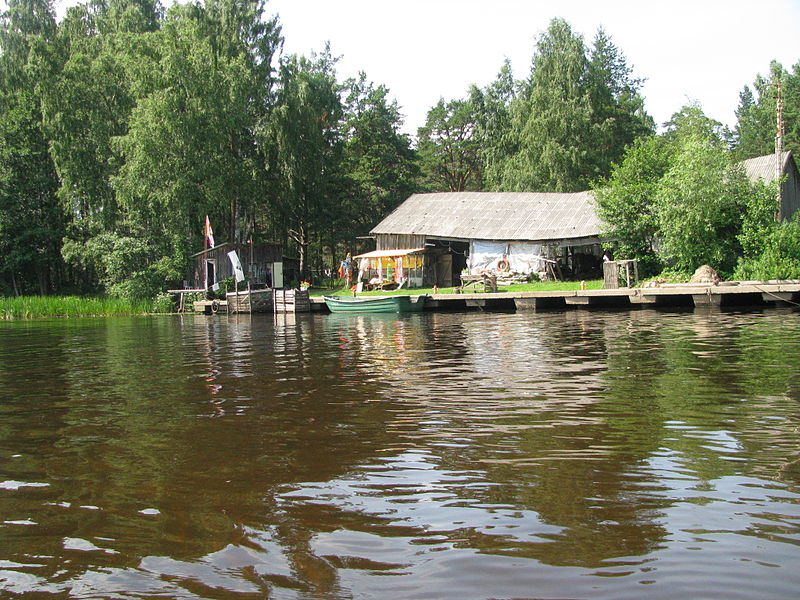
- Village pier

- Location in Latvia
- Coordinates: 57°37′08″N 22°06′24″E
- Country: Latvia
- Municipality: Ventspils Municipality
- Parish: Tārgale Parish
- First mentioned: 1387
- Elevation: 13 ft (4 m)

Population (2015)
  - Total: 4
- Time zone: UTC+2 (EET)
  - Summer (DST): UTC+3 (EEST)

Lielirbe (Livonian: Īra) is a populated place in Tārgale Parish, Ventspils Municipality, Latvia. It is one of the twelve Livonian villages on Līvõd rānda - the Livonian Coast. The name from Latvian translates to 'Great Irbe (River)', since the Irbe flows in to the Baltic Sea at the village.

Most homes in the village are not inhabited year-round after the Livonian Coast was made into a closed border area of the Iron Curtain for fifty years during the Soviet occupation of Latvia.

== Notable people ==
Born in Lielirbe:

- Mārtiņš Lepste (Livonian: Maŗt Lepst ) (1881-1958) — Livonian sailor and teacher on the Liv coast in 1923–1938, chairman of the Livonian Union in 1924–1933.
- Didriķis Blūms (1893-1970) — conductor of Lielirbe choir.
- Emīlija Rulle (1910-1989) — a poet.
- Valda Blūma-Šuvcāne (1923-2007) — researcher of the Livonian culture and history.

== See also ==
- Livonian people
