= Kolka, Latvia =

Village in Latvia

Kolka Livonian: Kūolka
- Village
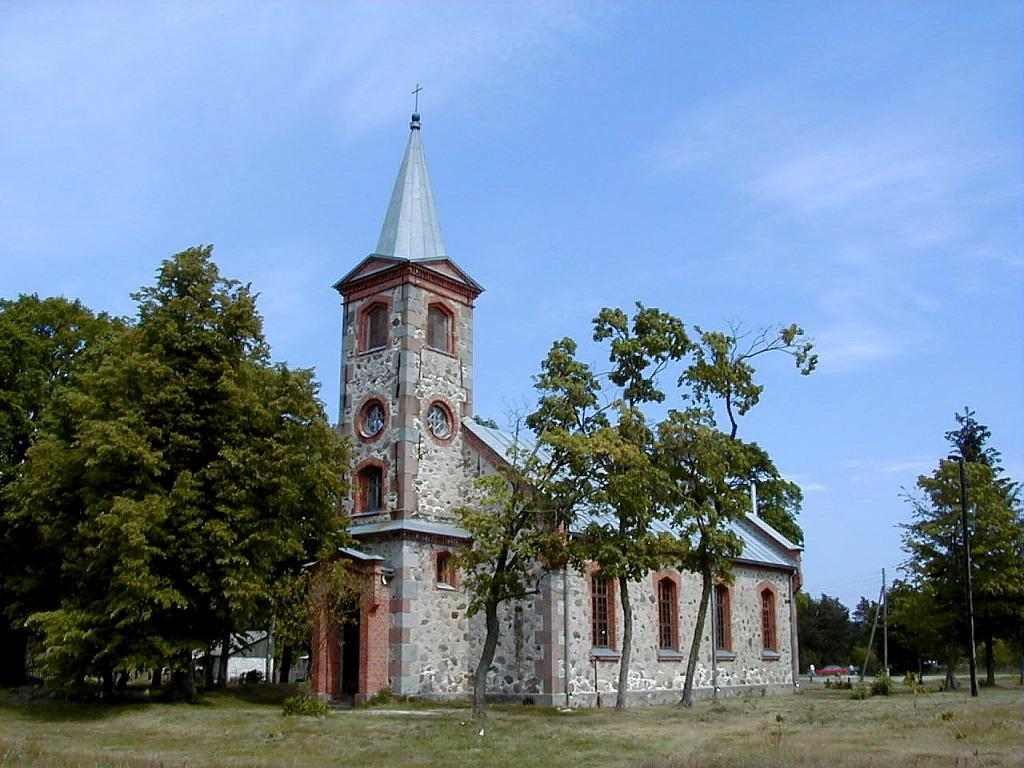
- Lutheran Church in Kolka

- Location in Latvia
- Coordinates: 57°44′33″N 22°35′04″E
- Country: Latvia
- Municipality: Talsi Municipality
- Parish: Kolka Parish
- Elevation: 9.8 ft (3 m)

Population (2011)
  - Total: 874
- Time zone: UTC+2 (EET)
  - Summer (DST): UTC+3 (EEST)
- Postal code: LV-3275 Kolka
- Climate: Cfb

Kolka (Livonian: Kūolka) is a large village in Kolka Parish, Talsi Municipality, on the tip of Cape Kolka in Courland in Latvia, on the coast of the Gulf of Riga.

== History ==
Cape Kolka (Tumisnis) is mentioned for the first time in the Nordic Viking Age and is mentioned in the inscription of the Mervalla Runestone which dates from around 1000 AD is thus one of the oldest written sources that mentions areas of Latvia. According to some historians, a Catholic missionary built a church on Cape Kursa after the Danish invasion around 1050. After 1161, King Abel appointed Ernemord, a canon of the Church of Lund in Denmark, as bishop of Kuramaa. Kolka may be the place where Danish archbishop Absalon built the first church in the Baltic region. The first mentions of it are from 1387, when it was called Domesnes, which may refer to Danish or Finnish background. The Livonian name Kūolka means "corner" in English.

Situated on the cape, the Kolka lighthouse was built in 1864 by the Russian Empire navy and has been renovated twice (in 1975 and 1985). There are also ruins of the old lighthouse, which was built in the 14th century.

== Climate ==
Kolka has an oceanic climate (Köppen Cfb), because the average temperature in winter is very close to the freezing point.

Climate data for Cape Kolka (1991−2020 normals, extremes 1884−present)
| Month | Jan | Feb | Mar | Apr | May | Jun | Jul | Aug | Sep | Oct | Nov | Dec | Year |
|---|---|---|---|---|---|---|---|---|---|---|---|---|---|
| Record high °C (°F) | 10.2 (50.4) | 14.3 (57.7) | 19.1 (66.4) | 23.5 (74.3) | 28.0 (82.4) | 31.2 (88.2) | 32.0 (89.6) | 32.1 (89.8) | 28.4 (83.1) | 21.5 (70.7) | 15.3 (59.5) | 12.2 (54.0) | 32.1 (89.8) |
| Mean daily maximum °C (°F) | 1.1 (34.0) | 0.6 (33.1) | 3.4 (38.1) | 8.3 (46.9) | 13.8 (56.8) | 18.0 (64.4) | 21.1 (70.0) | 20.7 (69.3) | 16.4 (61.5) | 10.7 (51.3) | 5.9 (42.6) | 2.7 (36.9) | 10.2 (50.4) |
| Daily mean °C (°F) | −0.8 (30.6) | −1.6 (29.1) | 0.5 (32.9) | 4.5 (40.1) | 9.6 (49.3) | 14.3 (57.7) | 17.5 (63.5) | 17.1 (62.8) | 13.2 (55.8) | 8.1 (46.6) | 3.9 (39.0) | 1.0 (33.8) | 7.3 (45.1) |
| Mean daily minimum °C (°F) | −3.1 (26.4) | −4.2 (24.4) | −2.6 (27.3) | 0.8 (33.4) | 5.2 (41.4) | 9.9 (49.8) | 13.2 (55.8) | 12.8 (55.0) | 9.5 (49.1) | 5.2 (41.4) | 1.8 (35.2) | −1.3 (29.7) | 3.9 (39.1) |
| Record low °C (°F) | −29.3 (−20.7) | −31.5 (−24.7) | −22.5 (−8.5) | −15.1 (4.8) | −4.6 (23.7) | −1.6 (29.1) | 4.2 (39.6) | 1.0 (33.8) | −3.2 (26.2) | −5.8 (21.6) | −15.5 (4.1) | −22.3 (−8.1) | −31.5 (−24.7) |
| Average precipitation mm (inches) | 44.2 (1.74) | 36.1 (1.42) | 34.3 (1.35) | 31.2 (1.23) | 34.0 (1.34) | 62.7 (2.47) | 71.5 (2.81) | 82.2 (3.24) | 58.1 (2.29) | 68.2 (2.69) | 58.1 (2.29) | 48.6 (1.91) | 629.2 (24.78) |
| Average precipitation days (≥ 1 mm) | 11 | 9 | 8 | 7 | 6 | 9 | 9 | 11 | 10 | 13 | 13 | 12 | 118 |
| Mean monthly sunshine hours | 30.6 | 64.7 | 148.2 | 214.8 | 270.3 | 284.4 | 265.9 | 226.2 | 161.6 | 94.5 | 31.4 | 26.7 | 1,819.3 |
Source 1: LVĢMC
Source 2: NOAA (precipitation days 1981-2010), infoclimat.fr (sunshine 1991-2020)

== Livonian homeland ==
Kolka and other surrounding villages of the Livonian coast are home to the last remnants of Latvia's Livonian ethnic group, whose Livonian language is highly endangered. The village has the highest number of Livonians in the historical area of the Livonian coast. In 1995, of the 186 Livonians in Latvia, 53 were living in Kolka.

== Religion ==
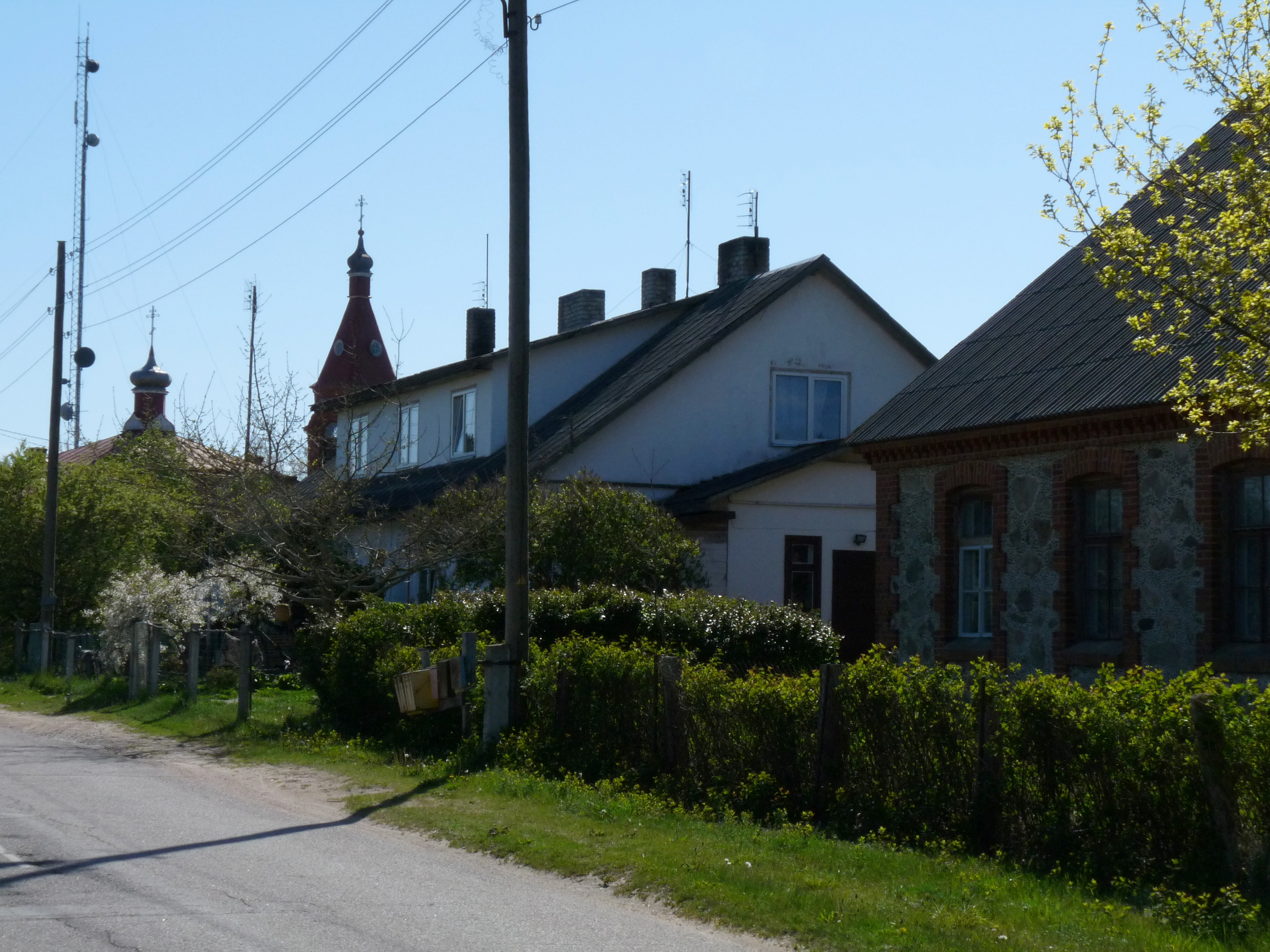
Former Orthodox seminary and Russian Orthodox church in the background

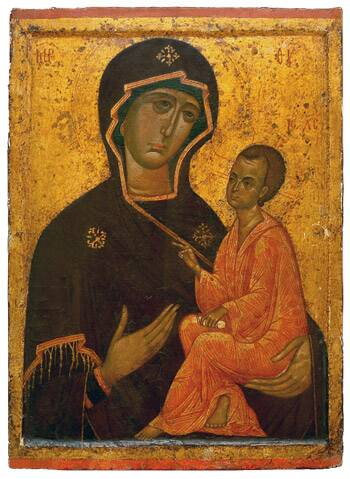
The Theotokos of Tikhvin (by Luke the Evangelist)

Kolka is home to three picturesque and historic churches, each representing one of the largest religious communities in Latvia: Lutheran, Russian Orthodox, and Roman Catholic. The town also holds a special connection to the Theotokos of Tikhvin. It was Kolka’s Russian Orthodox priest who first safeguarded the icon for many years in the USA, and later, his spiritual son returned it to its original location at Tikhvin Monastery in Russia.

== Present times ==
Kolka has a small hotel, a restaurant, several shops, a post office, a chemist, and a petrol station. An old fish processing factory (now closed) is located in the port harbour. There is a Livonian cultural centre with a small museum.

== See also ==
- Livonian people
