= Talsi district =

Former district of Latvia

Coordinates: 57°15′N 22°36′E

Talsi
- District
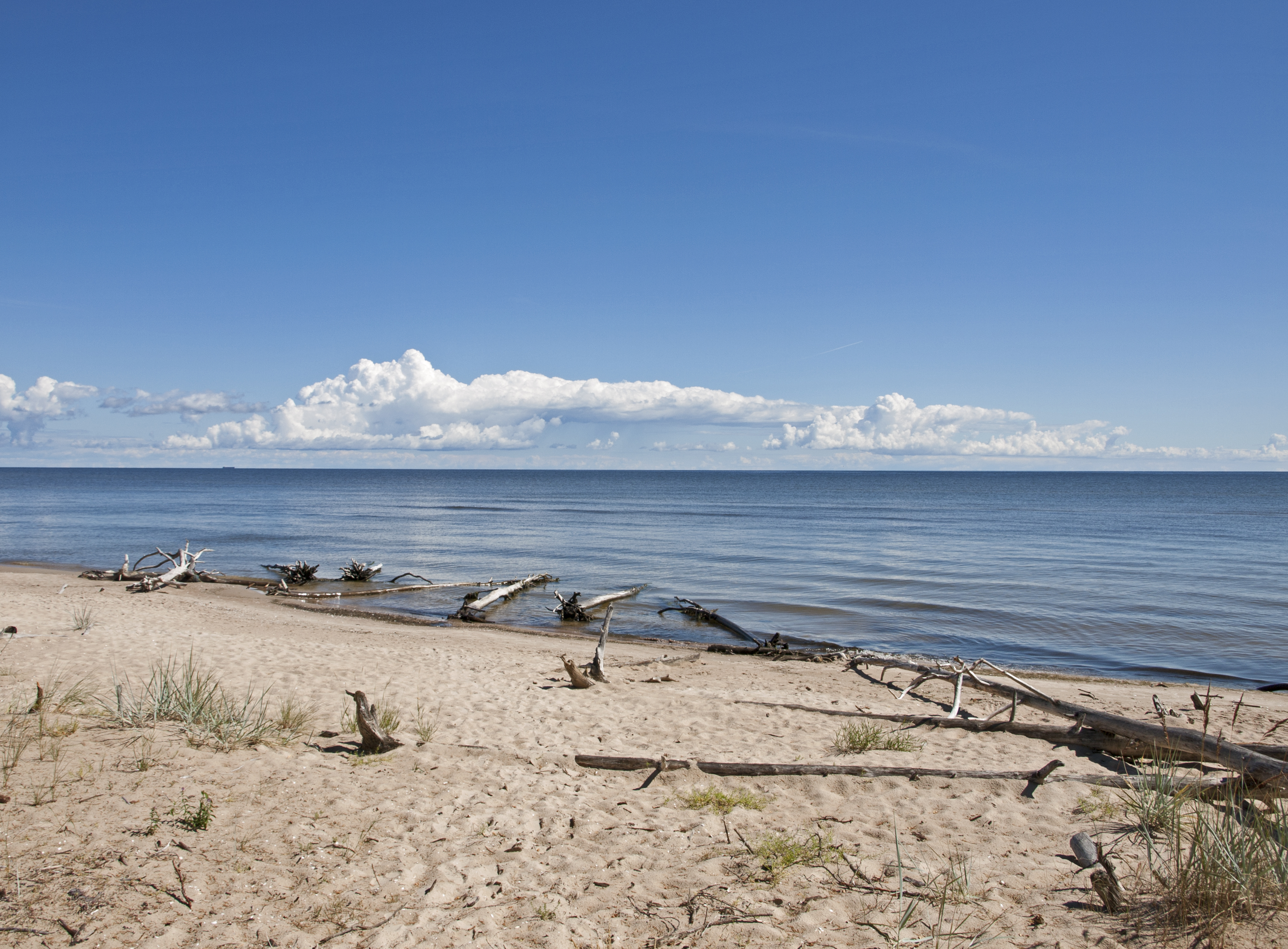
- Coast at the eastern side of Cape Kolka

- Coat of arms

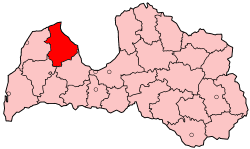
- Country: Latvia

Area
  - Total: 2,744 km^{2} (1,059 sq mi)

Population
  - Total: 49,662
  - Density: 18.10/km^{2} (46.87/sq mi)
- Website: talsurajons.lv/

Talsi district (Latvian: Talsu rajons) was a district of Latvia, located in Courland region, in the country's west. It was one of the former 26 rural districts of Latvia and it consisted of 20 local communities. Districts were eliminated on 20 June 2009 as the result of the administrative-territorial reform in 2009.

These included three towns:

- Talsi (12,391 inhabitants)—the center of the district
- Valdemārpils town with its rural territory
- Stende town
- one region—Sabile Region, including Sabile Town;
- 16 rural municipalities (pagasts): Kolka, Roja, Mērsrags, Dundaga, Balgale, Ģibuļi, Īve, Ķūļciems, Laidze, Lauciene, Lībagi, Lube, Strazde, Valdgale, Vandzene and Virbi.

Talsi district was located in the northern part of Courland. It bordered the districts of Ventspils, Kuldiga and Tukums. It was surrounded by the 96-km-long shoreline of the Gulf of Riga and the Irbe Strait.

The district covered 2,751 square kilometers (1,062 sq mi), or 4.1% of the whole territory of Latvia. Woodland covered 55% of Talsi district's territory, 29% was agricultural land, 3.5% was water, and 3.4% (9,400 ha; 23,200 ac) were swamps, of which peat production covered 1,700 ha (4,200 ac).

The highest point in Talsi is Kamparkalns, 174 metres (571 ft) above sea level at Talsi Hillock.

== Demographics ==
The total population was 49,842 people, or 2.1% of the entire population of Latvia. Nationalities included Latvians - 92%, Russians - 4%, others (Romanis, Belarusians and Ukrainians) - 4%. Population density was 18 people per square km, compared to the national density of 38 people per square km. 63.5% of the population was urban, and 36.5% was rural.
