= Stende (disambiguation) =

Stende is a town in Latvia.

Stende may also refer to:

- Stende Manor, Latvia
- Stende River, Latvia
- Stende Station, Altvia
- Stende, Soviet built freezer trawler later known as Dalniy Vostok, see Sinking of the Dalniy Vostok
