= Roja, Latvia =

Village in Latvia

Roja
- Village
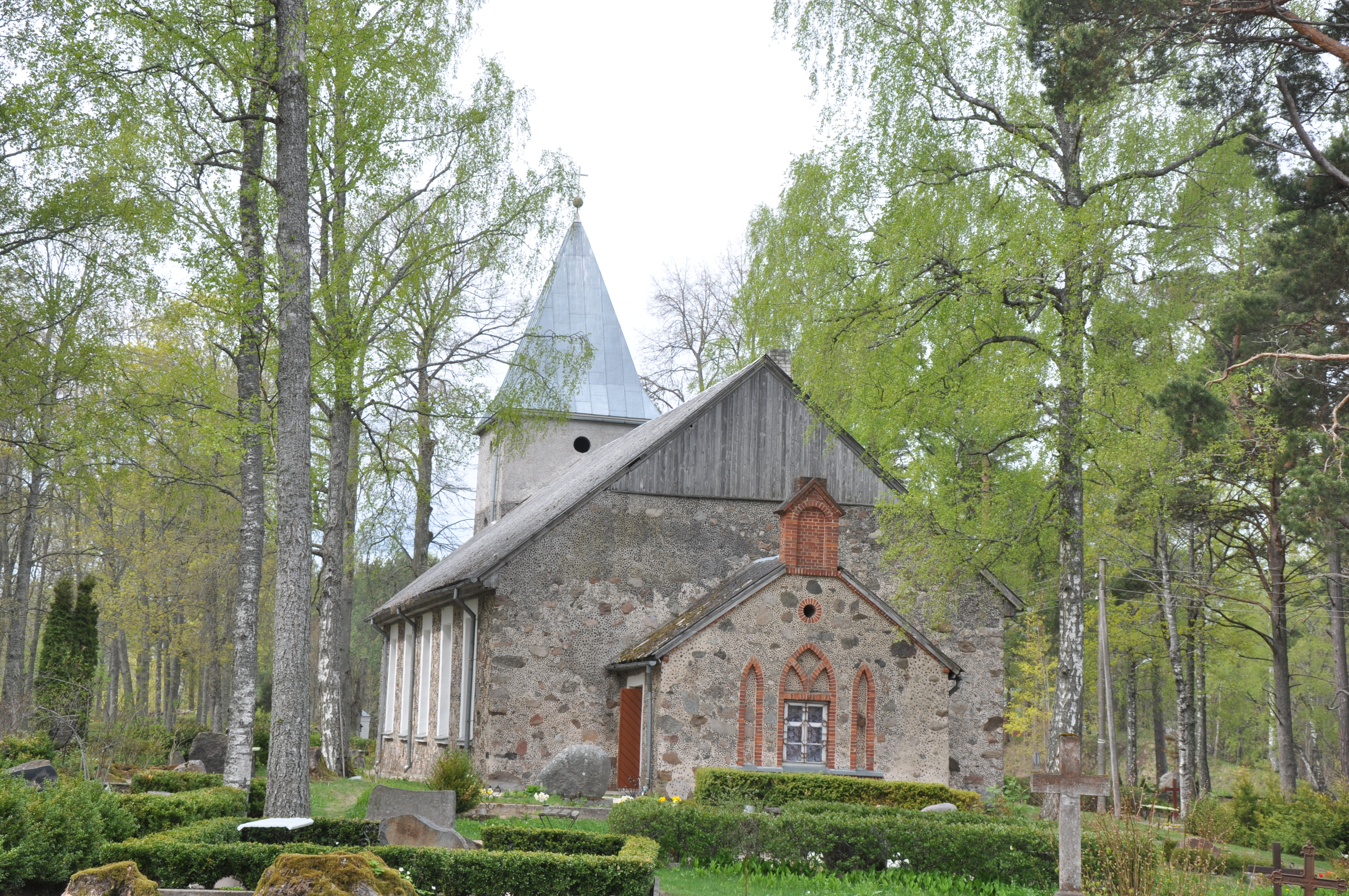

- Location within Latvia
- Country: Latvia
- Municipality: Talsi Municipality
- Elevation: 6 m (20 ft)

Population
  - Total: 2,112
- Post code: LV-3264

Roja (Livonian: Rūoj) is a large village in Talsi Municipality in the Courland region of Latvia. It is the center of Roja Parish and was the center of Roja Municipality 2009 to 2021. The Roja Port is located in the village at the mouth of the Roja River.

Since 2011, Roja hosts the RojaL Summer Film Festival, where films are also shown on the local beach. Music and art are also being showcased during the event.
