= Strazde =

Coordinates: 57°07′49″N 22°43′29″E

- Village
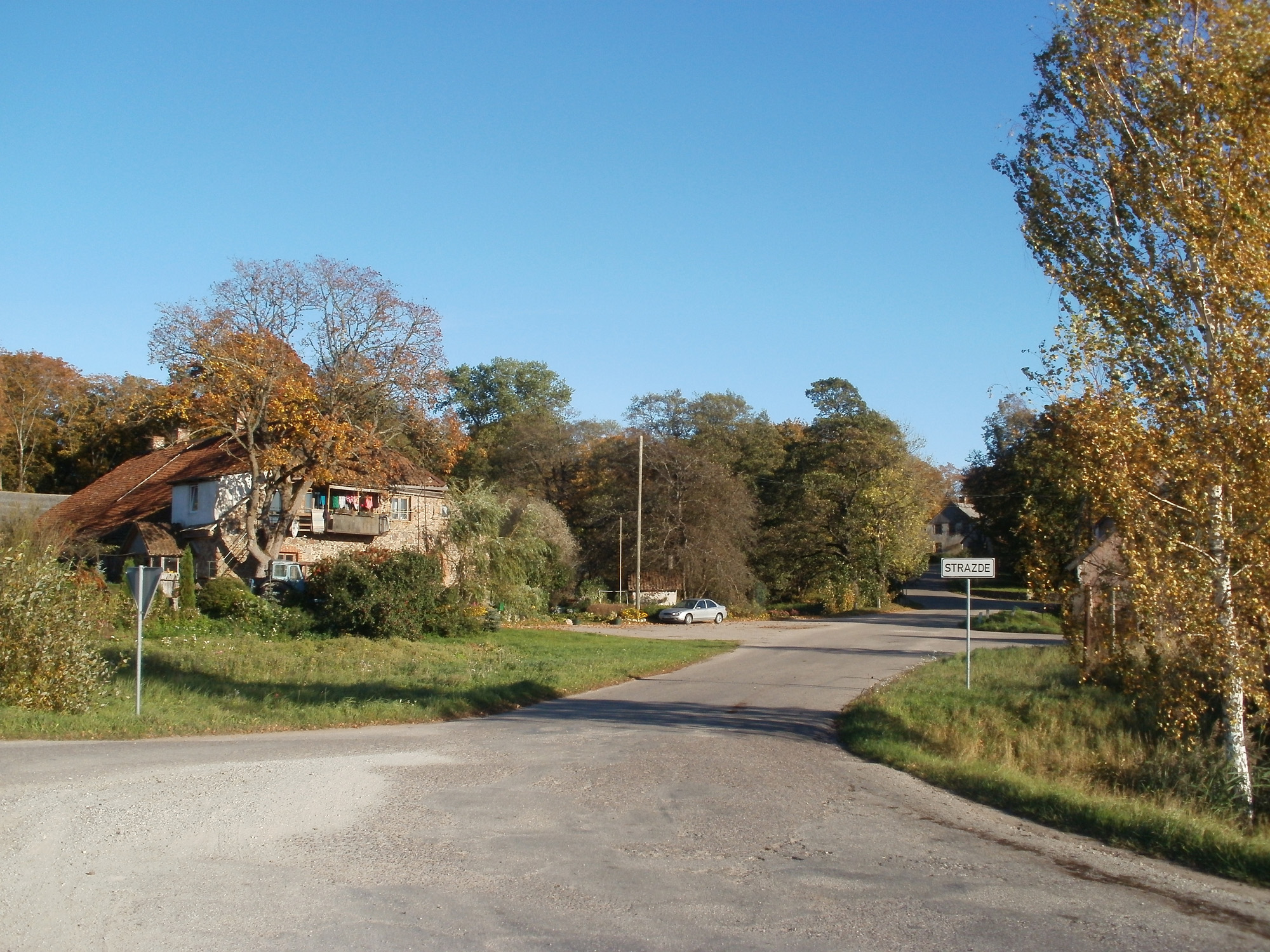
- Entrance to Strazde from the Jaunpagasts side

- Location within Latvia
- Country: Latvia
- Municipality: Talsi Municipality
- Parish: Strazde Parish
- First mentioned: 1253

Area
  - Total: 1.21 km^{2} (0.47 sq mi)
- Elevation: 100 m (330 ft)

Population (2015)
  - Total: 131
- Postal code: LV-3291 Strazde

Strazde is a village in the Strazde Parish of Talsi Municipality in the Courland region of Latvia. It is the center of the parish. The village is located near the A10 road, 20 km from the municipal center of Talsi and 99 km from Riga.

Strazde has a parish administration, a shop, a post office, a library, and a leisure center. The local architectural monument is the manor complex with a park.

== History ==
Strazde (Villa Stratzen) was first mentioned in historical sources in 1253 or 1291, where 14 ploughs of land were owned by Herman Toran as a fief of the order. In 1324, the village was mentioned as Strassze, and in 1352 as Stradze.

The village developed around the center of the former Groß-Strasden Manor. From 1918 to 1974 and after 1992, it was the center of the parish (village council).

== Demographics ==
=== Population changes ===
Within its current boundaries, based on data from CSP and OSP.

Population changes

Year	Pop.	±%
1970	105	—
1979	100	−4.8%
1989	133	+33.0%

Year	Pop.	±%
2000	160	+20.3%
2011	132	−17.5%
2021	144	+9.1%
