= Vandzene =

Village in Talsi municipality, Latvia

Coordinates: 57°20′N 22°48′E

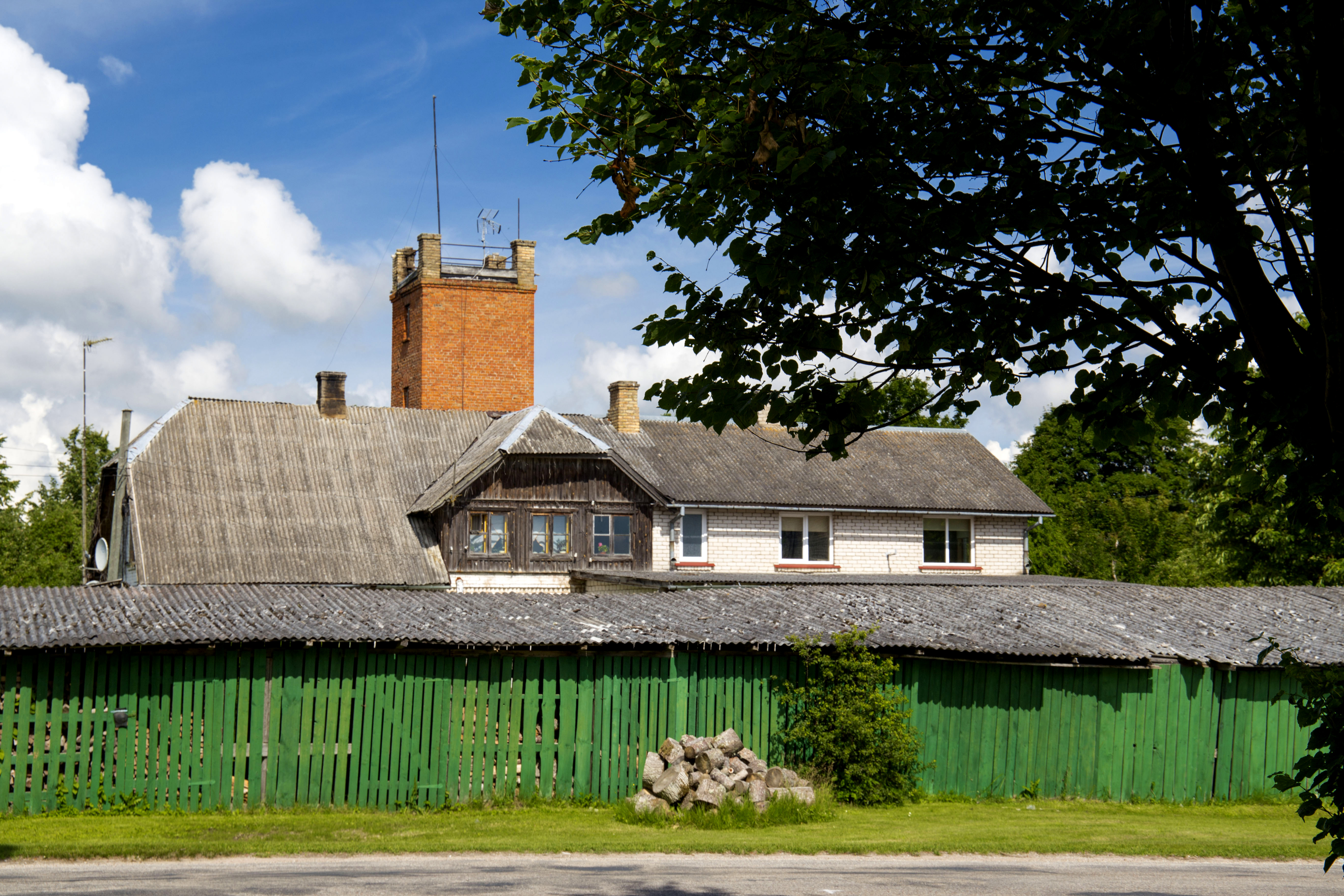
Village parish church

Vandzene is a village in Vandzene parish, Talsi Municipality, in the Courland region of Latvia. The community's elevation is 49 m (160 ft).

The Vandzene Manor was built at the start of the 19th century. At present, Vandzene Gymnasium occupies the estate.

The grand-stone of Vandzene, with a circumference of 26 metres, is the third largest stone in Latvia. In ancient times it was a place of worship and stood amid an apple orchard and birch grove.
