= Sīkrags =

Village in Latvia

Sīkrags Livonian: Sīkrõg
- Village
- Location in Latvia
- Coordinates: 57°39′38″N 22°13′35″E
- Country: Latvia
- Municipality: Talsi Municipality
- Parish: Kolka Parish
- First mentioned: 1387
- Elevation: 13 ft (4 m)

Population (2015)
  - Total: 11
- Time zone: UTC+2 (EET)
  - Summer (DST): UTC+3 (EEST)
- Postal code: LV-3275 Kolka

Sīkrags (Livonian: Sīkrõg) is a small village in Kolka Parish, Talsi Municipality, Latvia. It is one of the twelve Livonian villages on Līvõd rānda - the Livonian Coast and one of the oldest.

Sīkrags was mentioned in writing as early as 1387 and served as one of the most important small ports in northern Kurzeme during the 17th century. During World War I, German troops built a station of the Stende-Ventspils narrow gauge railway near the village. During the Soviet occupation of Latvia Sīkrags was one of the few places on the sealed-off Livonian Coast where local fishing was permitted. In 1955, a small fish processing plant was built in the village, but was closed ten years later, dealing a blow to the growth of the village.

The Sīkragciems Lighthouse is situated on the west side of the village (57°39.46′N 22°12.95′E).

Other names of the village include Sīkraga, Sikrag, Sīkraguciems.

== Notable people ==
- Pētõr Damberg, Livonian linguist, poet and teacher was born in Sīkrags.
- Hilda Cerbaha-Grīva (1910–1984), Musician and Conductor of the livischen Folklore-Ensemble Kandla in Ventspils.

== See also ==
- Livonian people
