= Vandzene Manor =

Manor house in Latvia

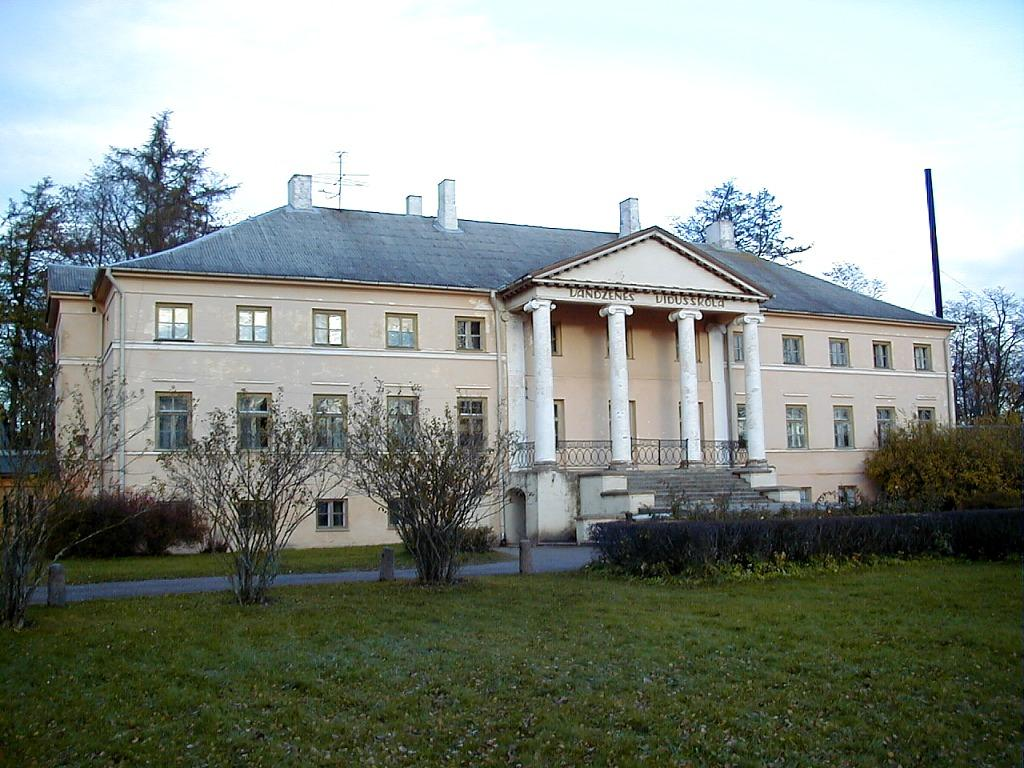

- Location within Latvia

General information
- Location: Vandzene Parish, Talsi Municipality, Courland, Latvia
- Coordinates: 57°19′40″N 22°48′13″E
- Client: Heikings

Vandzene Manor (Latvian: Vandzenes muižas pils, German: Herrenhaus Wandsen) is a manor house in Vandzene Parish, Talsi Municipality in the historical region of Courland, in western Latvia.

== History ==
Vandzene manor is first mentioned in the 17th century. The manor ensemble was created for the family of Baron Heikings in the middle of the 19th century. The manor park (17 ha) is one of the most typical Latvian landscape parks. In front of the manor palace is a front garden designed in 1937 by Andrejs Zeidaks, garden architect from Riga. Since 1937, Vandzene Secondary School, originally founded in 1866, has been located in the manor palace.

== See also ==
- List of palaces and manor houses in Latvia
