= Damberg =

Damberg is a surname. Notable people with the surname include:

- Britt Damberg (1937–2019), Swedish singer and actress
- Mikael Damberg (born 1971), Swedish politician
- Pētõr Damberg (1909–1987), Livonian linguist, poet, and teacher
- Voldemar Damberg (1899–1965), Soviet general of Latvian ethnicity

== See also ==
- Danberg
