= Jaunpagasts =

Jaunpagasts Virbi
- village
- Street in Jaunpagasts

- Coordinates: 57°07′44″N 22°38′34″E
- Country: Latvia
- Municipality: Talsi Municipality
- Parish: Virbi Parish
- Established: 1927

Area
  - Total: 0,958 km^{2} (370 sq mi)

Population (2022)
  - Total: 392
- Postal code: LV-3292 Virbi

Jaunpagasts (also known as Virbi) is a village in the Virbi Parish of Talsi Municipality in the Courland region of Latvia. Jaunpagasts is the center of the parish. Located on the left bank of the Virbu River, along Ventspils—Tukums II railway (Sabile station), it is 16 km away from the municipality center Talsi and 105 km from Riga, the national capital.

Jaunpagasts is home to the parish administration, Virbu primary school, cultural center, kindergarten, library, family doctor's practice, and the Neivakene Old Believers Church (built in 1928). The largest companies are SIA "Jaunpagasts Plus" (Brūzī) and SIA "Jaunalko".

== History ==
Jaunpagasts is mentioned in historical sources for the first time in 1237 in the feudal book. The present-day settlement was established on the land of the former Jaunpagasts (Neuwacken) manor (now the inhabited place Brūzis on the right bank of the Virbu River) near the railway station. In 1909–1911, with the financial support of the Don Agrarian Bank, approximately 120 families settled in the vicinity of Jaunpagasts. In the post-war years, Jaunpagasts became the central village of the Soviet collective farm "Virbi".

== Population ==
According to the 2022 census, the population of the village is 392 people.
