= Mērsrags Municipality =

Municipality of Latvia

Coordinates: 57.5083°N 22.8092°E

Mērsrags Municipality Mērsraga novads
- Municipality
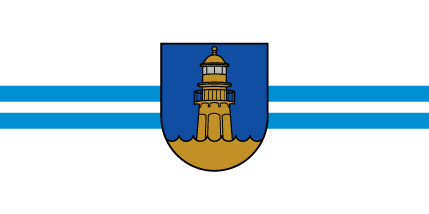
- Flag Coat of arms

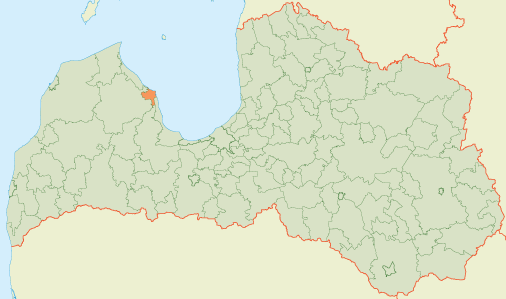
- Country: Latvia
- Formed: 2011
- Centre: Mērsrags

Government
  - Council Chair: Roberts Šiliņš (Us for Mērsrags Municipality)

Area
  - Total: 109.76 km^{2} (42.38 sq mi)
  - Land: 88.69 km^{2} (34.24 sq mi)
  - Water: 21.07 km^{2} (8.14 sq mi)

Population (2021)
  - Total: 1,431
  - Density: 16.13/km^{2} (41.79/sq mi)
- Website: www.mersrags.lv

Mērsrags Municipality (Latvian: Mērsraga novads) is a former administrative unit of Latvia, formed in 2011. As of 2020, the population was 1,407.

== History ==
In 2009, Roja Municipality was formed by merging Mērsrags Parish and Roja Parish, both at the coast of the Baltic Sea. In January 2010, the residents of Mērsraga in a general meeting decided to withdraw from the new municipality and create an independent Mērsrags municipality. In September 2010, the national parliament Saeima in a first reading supported a change of the law of administrative territories and populated areas for the establishment of Mērsrags municipality. Separate Roja and Mērsrags municipality council elections took place on 18 December 2010. Officially, Mērsrags Municipality came into life on 3 January 2011.

On 1 July 2021, Mērsrags Municipality ceased to exist and its territory was merged into Talsi Municipality.

== See also ==
- Administrative divisions of Latvia
