= Košrags =

Village in Latvia

Košrags Livonian: Kuoštrõg
- Village
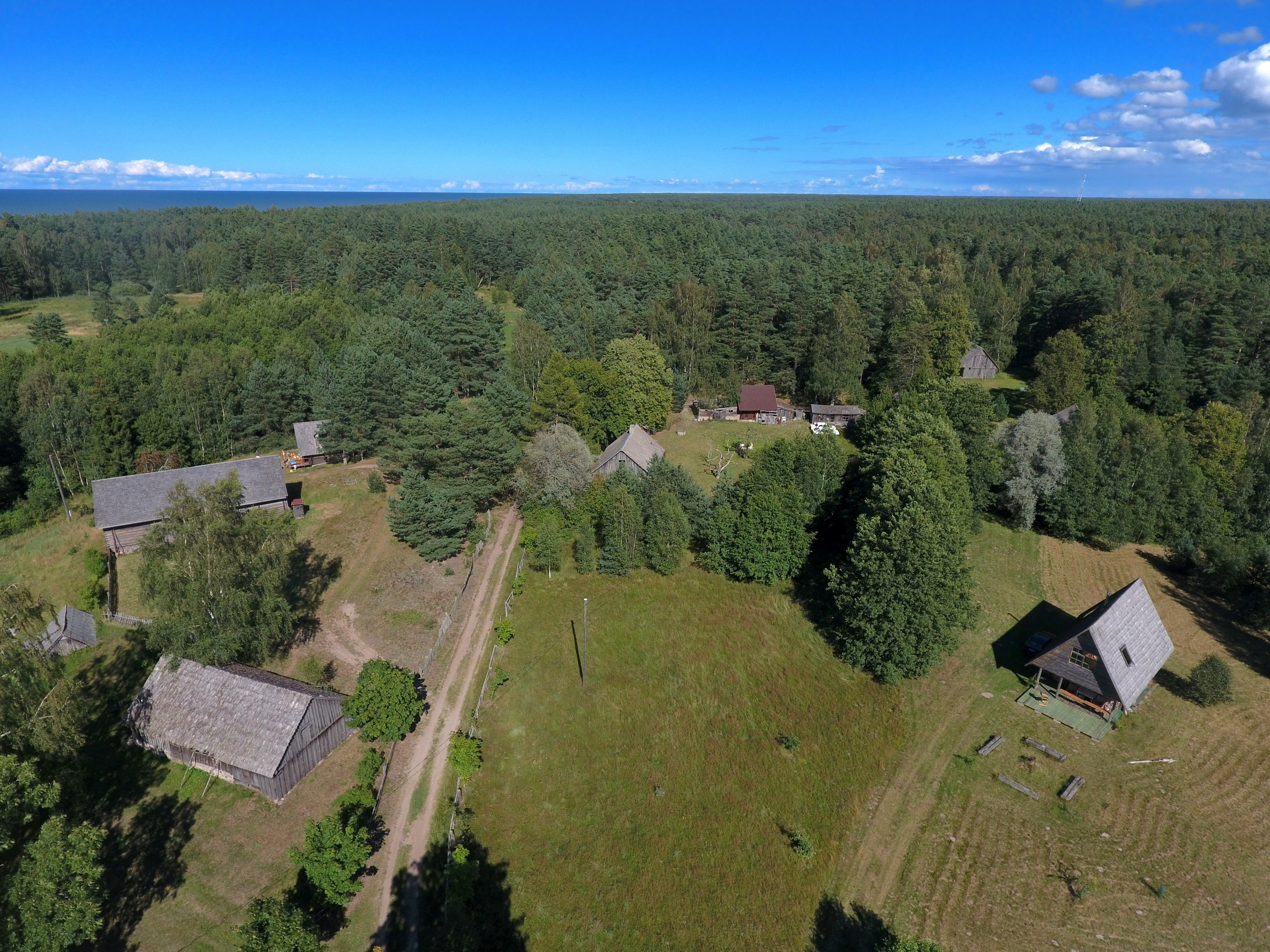
- Košrags fishermen's village

- Location in Latvia
- Coordinates: 57°42′N 22°22′E
- Country: Latvia
- Municipality: Talsi Municipality
- Parish: Kolka Parish
- First mentioned: 1680
- Elevation: 16 ft (5 m)

Population (2005)
  - Total: 13
- Time zone: UTC+2 (EET)
  - Summer (DST): UTC+3 (EEST)
- Postal code: LV-3275 Kolka

Košrags (Livonian: Kuoštrõg) is a small village in Kolka Parish, Talsi Municipality, Latvia. It sits on the shore of the Irbe Strait of the Baltic Sea. It is one of twelve Livonian villages on Līvõd rānda (Livonian Coast).

The "Kukiņi" homestead located in Košrags was first mentioned in 1680 chronicles. Košrags is one of the newest of Liv villages, formed in the 17th century. By 1770 four old farms operated in Košrags (Kine-Dīķi, Kūkiņi, Tilmači and Žoki). Two tenant-farmer habitations existed in 1896, and another seven habitations after 1905.

The houses were built densely along two roads:

- an old littoral road connecting all 16 Livonian fishermen villages at that time;
- the fishermen's road leading from the littoral road - it connected the villages with the working place near the sea.

These roads have preserved their ancient shape till the present day.

Livonian priest and ethnologist Edgar Vaalgamaa was born in Košrags.

== See also ==
- Livonian people
