= Nogale Manor =

Manor house in Latvia

Coordinates: 57.3687°N 22.7380°E

- Ārlava parish, Courland, Latvia
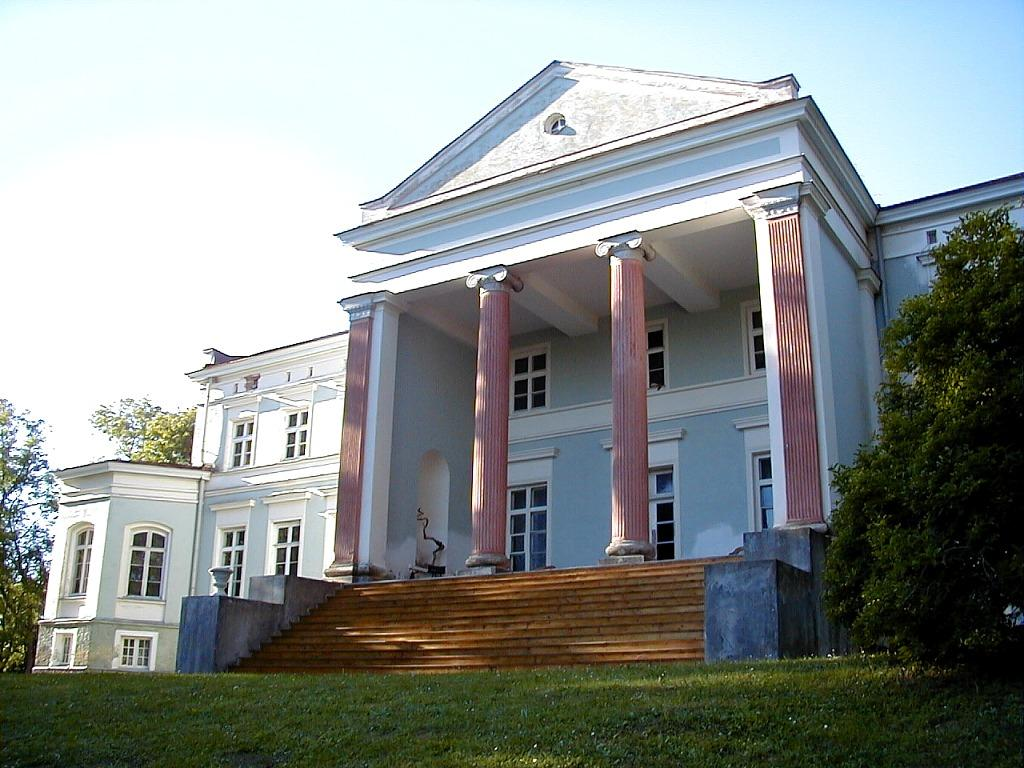

Site information
- Type: Manor

Site history
- Built: Around 1880

Nogale Manor (Latvian: Nogales muižas pils) is a manor house in Neo-Classicism style in Ārlava parish, in the Talsi municipality of the historical region of Courland, western Latvia. It was built around 1880 according to the project by the architect T. Seiler. The last owner was the noble family von Fircks in 1920.

== See also ==
- List of palaces and manor houses in Latvia
