= Sasmaka Manor =

Manor house in Latvia

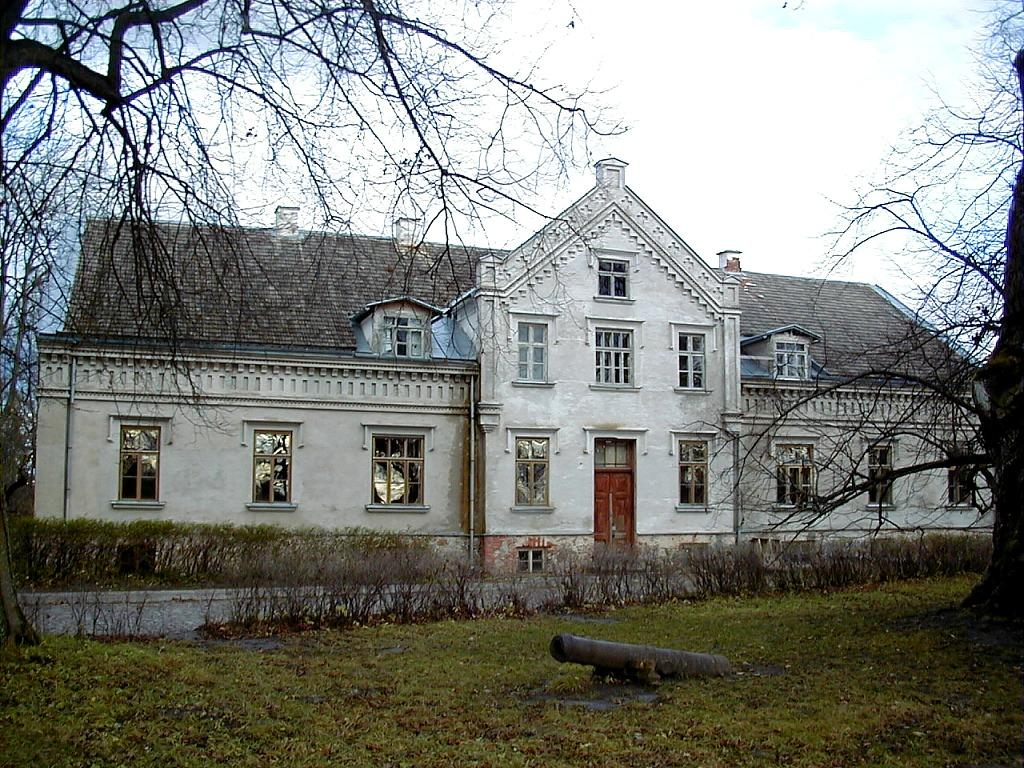
- Sasmaka Manor near Valdemārpils.

- Location within Latvia

General information
- Location: Courland, Latvia
- Coordinates: 57°22′45″N 22°36′03″E
- Completed: 1886
- Client: Manteuffel-Szoege

Sasmaka Manor (Latvian: Sasmakas muižas pils, German: Gutshaus Saßmacken) is a manor house located in a park near Lake Sasmaka west coast, near Valdemārpils, Talsi municipality, in the historical region of Courland, western Latvia.

== History ==
First mentioned in writings in 1582, the manor was built in 1886 and had as former owners the Manteuffel-Szoege family in the 17th century, the Hohenastenberg-Wigandt family and the von Sass family in the 18th century.

== See also ==
- List of palaces and manor houses in Latvia
