= Tiņģere Manor =

Manor house in Latvia

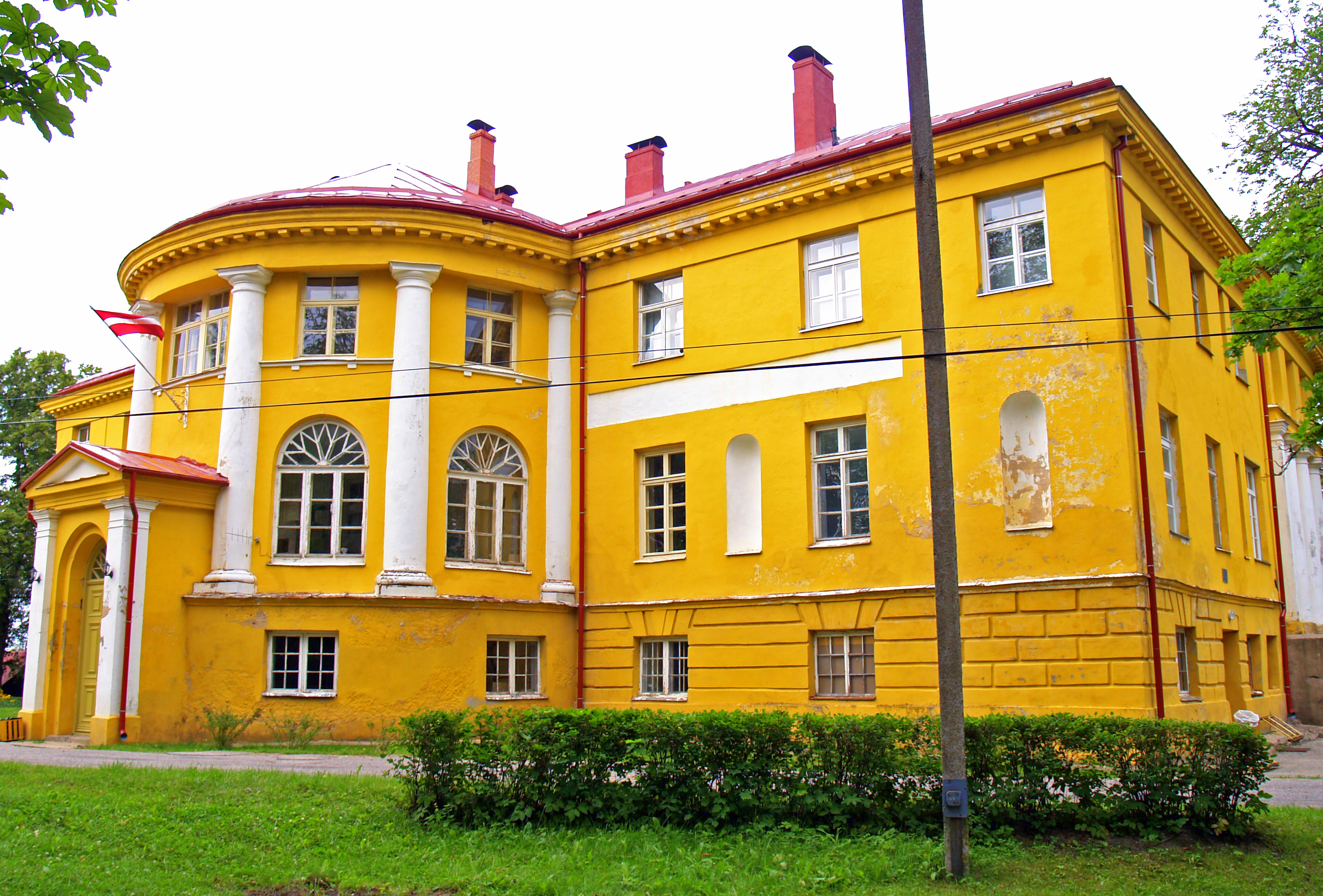
- Tiņģere Manor in 2007

- Location within Latvia

General information
- Location: Īve Parish, Courland, Latvia
- Coordinates: 57°27′00″N 22°31′34″E
- Completed: 1805
- Client: Baron Johann von Bach

Tiņģere Manor (Latvian: Tiņģeres muižas pils, German: Herrenhaus Tingern) is a manor house in Īve parish in Talsi municipality in the historical region of Courland, in western Latvia.

== History ==
Tiņģere Manor, which has survived to the present day, was built in 1805 by St. Petersburg banker Johann Bach. Since the end of the 19th century until the agrarian reform in 1920, the manor was a property of the Ostenzaken family. From the 1927 and until 2008 manor housed the Tiņģere elementary school. It is also used by the Ķurbe Lutheran congregation on Sundays.

== Tourist attractions ==
Manor interior can be seen by prior appointment which also includes theatrical tour and presentation of the history of the castle. Visitors walk through the manor's park and the Island of Love and enjoy work in the art studio and visit the cellars of the castle. Meal will be served in enjoyable the atmosphere.

== See also ==
- List of palaces and manor houses in Latvia
