= Danberg =

Danberg is a surname. Notable people with the surname include:

- Carl Danberg (born 1964), American judge and lawyer
- Scott Danberg (born 1962), American Paralympic athlete

== See also ==
- Damberg
