= Stende Manor =

Manor house in Latvia

Coordinates: 57°11′31″N 22°33′18″E

- Lībagi parish, Courland, Latvia
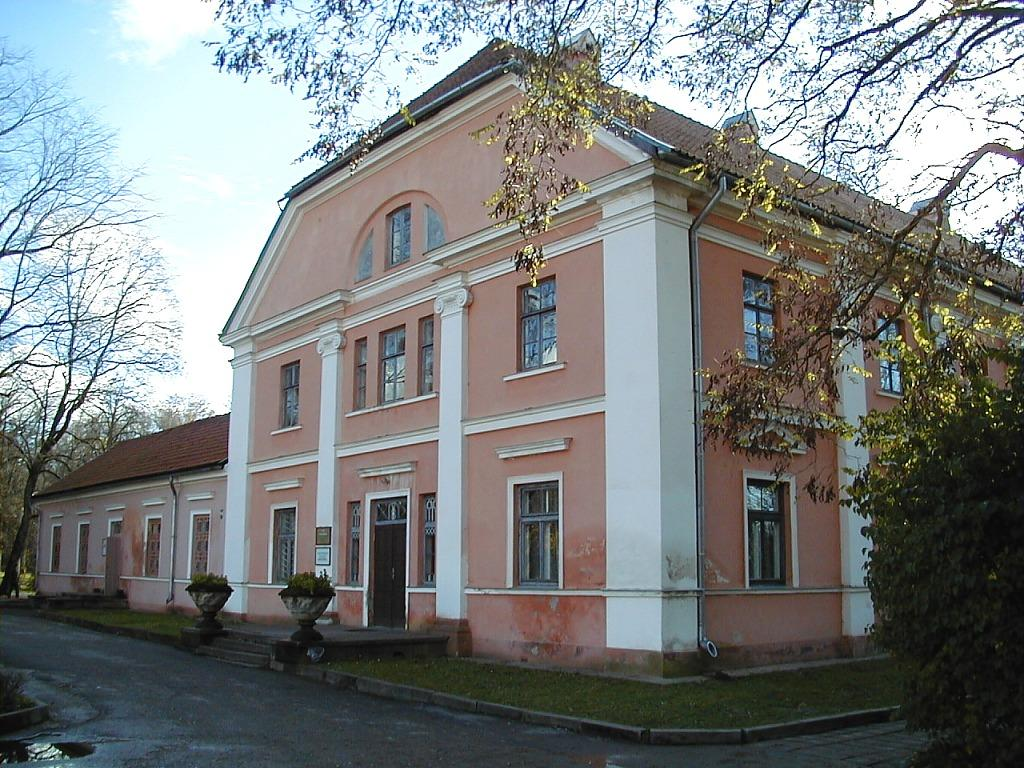

Site information
- Type: Manor

Stende Manor (Latvian: Stendes muižas pils), also called Dižstende Manor, is a manor house in Lībagi Parish in Talsi Municipality in the historical region of Courland, in western Latvia.

== History ==
It was originally built as a one-story structure between 1820 and 1848. A second story was added to the main building between 1848 and 1858. The manor was converted into apartments after 1925 and used so after the Second World War. Stende Manor is one of the ancient Latvian and Talsi county estates, well-preserved to this day, because it is always occupied and maintained. Fragments of an earlier medieval castle can still be seen on the estate.

== See also ==
- List of palaces and manor houses in Latvia
