= Abava Parish =

Parish in Latvia

- Coat of arms

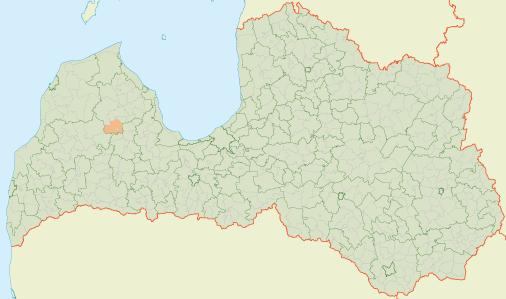
- Interactive map of Abava Parish
- Coordinates: 57°03′47″N 22°30′54″E
- Country: Latvia
- Municipality: Talsi

Area
  - Total: 156 km^{2} (60 sq mi)

Population (1 January 2026)
  - Total: 972
  - Density: 6.23/km^{2} (16.1/sq mi)
- Time zone: Eastern European Time
- Postal code: LV-3294

Abava parish (Latvian: Abavas pagasts) is an administrative unit of Talsi Municipality, Latvia.
