= Ārlava Parish =

Parish of Latvia

- parish of Latvia
- Jaunciems (Ārlava parish)

- Coat of arms

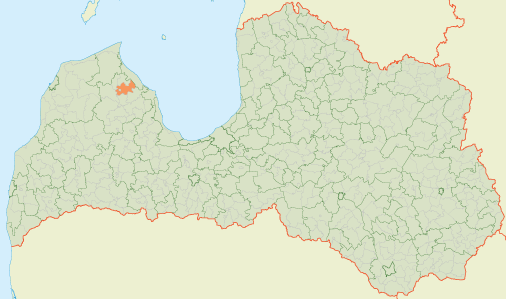
- Coordinates: 57°22′55″N 22°40′27″E
- Country: Latvia

Population (1 January 2026)
  - Total: 682
- Time zone: Eastern European Time
- Postal codes: LV-3260, LV-3262

Ārlava parish (Latvian: Ārlavas pagasts) is an administrative unit of Talsi Municipality, Latvia.

== See also ==
- Nogale Castle
