= Dursupe Manor =

Manor house in Latvia

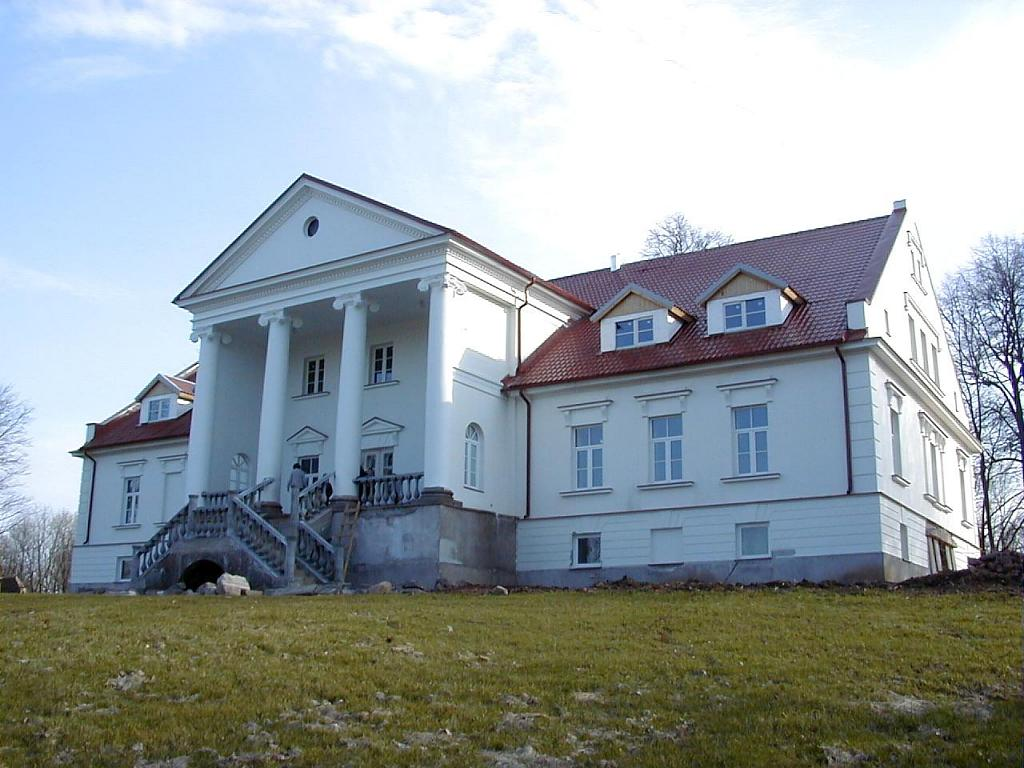

- Location within Latvia

General information
- Location: Dursupe, Balgale Parish, Talsi municipality, Courland, Latvia
- Coordinates: 57°11′37″N 22°52′16″E
- Completed: 1820

Dursupe Manor (Latvian: Dursupes muižas pils, German: Dursuppen, Groß-Dursuppen) is a manor house located in the Dursupe, Balgale Parish, Talsi Municipality, in the historical region of Courland, western Latvia.

== History ==
The manor house was built in 1820 and was reconstructed in the second half of the 19th century in Neoclassical style. The manor complex also includes several granaries, a servant's house, a lime tree, a fork and a 6.7-hectare park with split beech.

At the beginning of the 19th century, it was owned by Prince Karl Christoph Lieven (1767-1844), the Russian Minister of Education (1828-1833), the founder of the Teacher Training Seminary. K. K. Liven is buried at Balgale Church.

== See also ==
- List of palaces and manor houses in Latvia
