= Stende =

Town in Talsi Municipality, Latvia

- Town
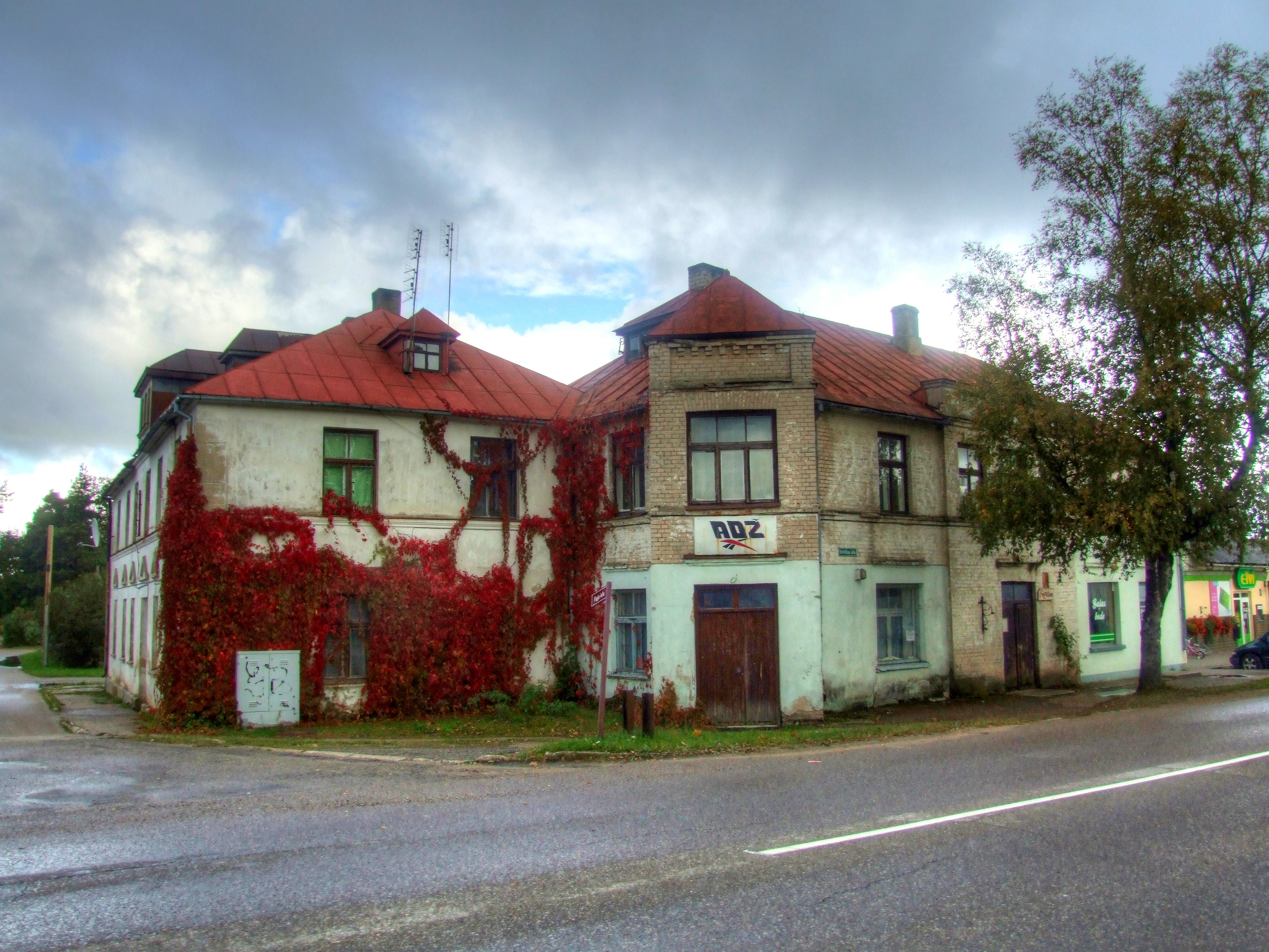
- Stende city corner.

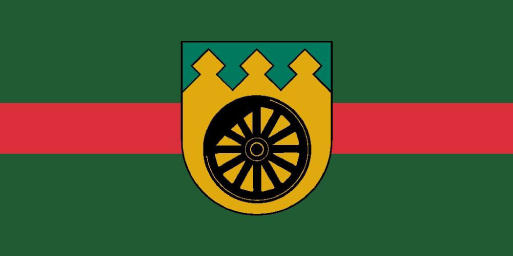
- Flag Coat of arms

- Location in Latvia
- Coordinates: 57°8′N 22°31′E
- Country: Latvia
- Municipality: Talsi Municipality
- Town rights: 1991

Government
  - Mayor: Solvita Ūdre
  - City council: 7 members

Area
  - Total: 4.84 km^{2} (1.87 sq mi)
  - Land: 4.76 km^{2} (1.84 sq mi)
  - Water: 0.08 km^{2} (0.031 sq mi)

Population (2026)
  - Total: 1,483
  - Density: 312/km^{2} (807/sq mi)
- Time zone: UTC+2 (EET)
  - Summer (DST): UTC+3 (EEST)
- Postal code: LV-3257
- Calling code: +371 632
- Climate: Dfb
- Website: https://www.stende.lv/

Stende (German: Stenden) is a town in Talsi Municipality, in the Courland region of Latvia.

== History ==
The settlement was on the land of the manor Stende since the 14th century. The whole of it was owned originally by the lord of the manor Philipp von der Brüggen, to whom it was granted by the Livonian Order. Rapid growth started when in 1904 a railway station Stende on the route Riga - Ventspils was established. During the First World War in 1915 Stende was occupied by German troops. To supply troops Germans had to build a better connections to the nearby port of Roja. For this purpose narrow-gauge railway or in military terms a field railway from Roja to Stende was built. From Stende supplies could be shipped via main railroad line.

In 1991, Stende was granted city rights.

== Demographics ==
=== Population changes ===
Historical population
| Year | Pop. | ±% |
|---|---|---|
| 1935 | 719 | — |
| 1959 | 1,850 | +157.3% |
| 1970 | 1,851 | +0.1% |
| 1973 | 1,956 | +5.7% |
| 1979 | 2,034 | +4.0% |
| 1989 | 2,134 | +4.9% |
| 2000 | 2,012 | −5.7% |
| 2011 | 1,732 | −13.9% |
Source: Latvian Geospatial Information Agency

=== Ethnicities ===
| Year | Population | Latvians | Russians | Belarusians | Ukrainians | Poles | Lithuanians | Jews | Gypsies | Tatars | Germans | Estonians | Others |
|---|---|---|---|---|---|---|---|---|---|---|---|---|---|
| 1935 | 719 | 690 | 9 | 0 | 0 | 13 | 0 | 3 | 0 | 0 | 4 | 0 | 0 |
| 1979 | 2034 | 1743 | 174 | 30 | 15 | 24 | 14 | 5 | N/A | N/A | N/A | N/A | 29 |
| 1989 | 2134 | 1851 | 161 | 33 | 21 | 25 | 15 | 1 | 18 | 4 | 0 | 1 | 4 |
| 2000 | 2012 | 1800 | 116 | 26 | 17 | 20 | 15 | 1 | 9 | N/A | N/A | 0 | 8 |
| 2011 | 1732 | 1603 | 80 | 15 | 13 | 7 | 6 | N/A | N/A | N/A | N/A | N/A | 8 |
| 2022 | 1550 | 1430 | 63 | N/A | N/A | N/A | N/A | N/A | N/A | N/A | N/A | N/A | 57 |

== Climate ==
Stende has a humid continental climate (Köppen Dfb).

Climate data for Stende (1991-2020 normals, extremes 1923-present)
| Month | Jan | Feb | Mar | Apr | May | Jun | Jul | Aug | Sep | Oct | Nov | Dec | Year |
|---|---|---|---|---|---|---|---|---|---|---|---|---|---|
| Record high °C (°F) | 9.5 (49.1) | 12.0 (53.6) | 18.3 (64.9) | 27.6 (81.7) | 33.4 (92.1) | 32.6 (90.7) | 33.6 (92.5) | 34.3 (93.7) | 29.7 (85.5) | 23.5 (74.3) | 16.1 (61.0) | 11.6 (52.9) | 34.3 (93.7) |
| Mean daily maximum °C (°F) | −0.3 (31.5) | −0.1 (31.8) | 3.9 (39.0) | 11.0 (51.8) | 16.7 (62.1) | 20.0 (68.0) | 22.5 (72.5) | 21.8 (71.2) | 16.8 (62.2) | 10.1 (50.2) | 4.5 (40.1) | 1.4 (34.5) | 10.7 (51.2) |
| Daily mean °C (°F) | −2.5 (27.5) | −2.7 (27.1) | 0.1 (32.2) | 5.8 (42.4) | 11.1 (52.0) | 14.7 (58.5) | 17.3 (63.1) | 16.6 (61.9) | 12.1 (53.8) | 6.8 (44.2) | 2.5 (36.5) | −0.8 (30.6) | 6.8 (44.2) |
| Mean daily minimum °C (°F) | −5.3 (22.5) | −5.8 (21.6) | −3.7 (25.3) | 0.8 (33.4) | 4.8 (40.6) | 8.7 (47.7) | 11.4 (52.5) | 11.2 (52.2) | 7.5 (45.5) | 3.3 (37.9) | 0.1 (32.2) | −3.0 (26.6) | 2.5 (36.5) |
| Record low °C (°F) | −34.5 (−30.1) | −36.1 (−33.0) | −27.9 (−18.2) | −15.9 (3.4) | −5.4 (22.3) | −3.1 (26.4) | 2.0 (35.6) | −0.2 (31.6) | −4.5 (23.9) | −11.8 (10.8) | −16.7 (1.9) | −26.0 (−14.8) | −36.1 (−33.0) |
| Average precipitation mm (inches) | 52.0 (2.05) | 39.1 (1.54) | 38.5 (1.52) | 38.1 (1.50) | 46.0 (1.81) | 71.4 (2.81) | 78.1 (3.07) | 83.4 (3.28) | 64.0 (2.52) | 74.9 (2.95) | 57.5 (2.26) | 52.5 (2.07) | 695.5 (27.38) |
| Average precipitation days (≥ 1 mm) | 11 | 10 | 9 | 8 | 8 | 9 | 10 | 11 | 10 | 12 | 12 | 12 | 122 |
| Average relative humidity (%) | 88.7 | 86.1 | 79.9 | 71.7 | 69.2 | 73.7 | 76.0 | 78.3 | 82.7 | 86.5 | 89.9 | 90.4 | 81.1 |
Source 1: LVĢMC
Source 2: NOAA (precipitation days, humidity 1991-2020)

== See also ==
- List of cities in Latvia
