= Hilda Grīva =

Latvian music teacher, Livonian folklorist and cultural activist

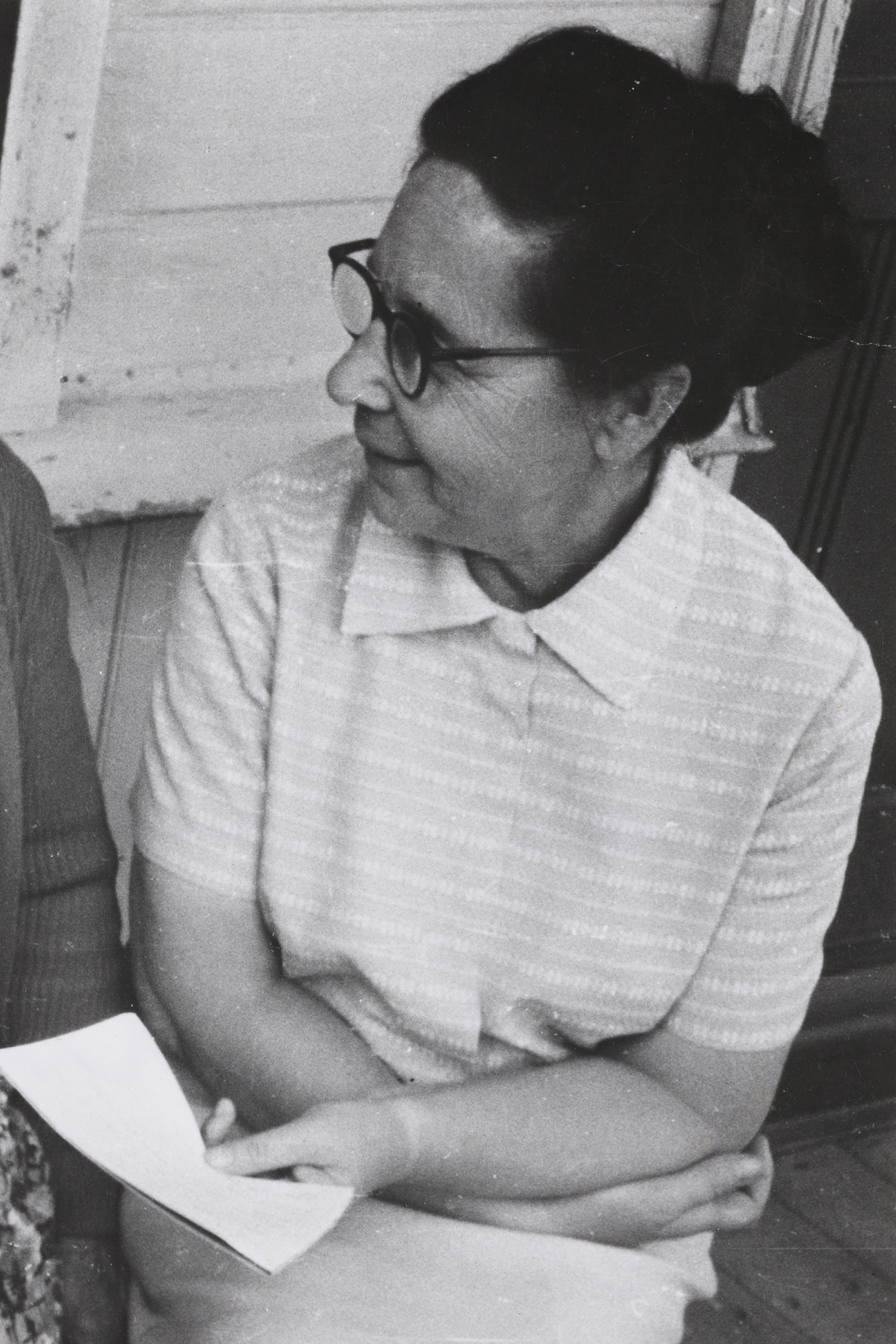
- Born: Hilda Cerbach; February 27, 1910; Sīkrags, Courland Governorate, Russian Empire
- Died: September 13, 1984 (aged 74); Ventspils, Courland, Latvian SSR
- Burial place: Sīkrags cemetery
- Occupations: Musician, music teacher
- Known for: Founder and artistic director of the Livonian folklore ensemble "Kāndla"

Hilda Grīva, also known as Hilda Cerbach-Grīva (née Cerbaha; 1910 – 13 September 1984), was a Latvian music teacher, choir conductor, and prominent Livonian cultural figure. She was the founder and artistic director of the Livonian folklore ensemble "Kāndla", a contributor to Livonian-language publishing, and an important tradition bearer and preserver of the Livonian language and song.

== Early life and education ==
Hilda Grīva was born in 1910 in the fishing hamlet of Sīkrags (in what is now Kolka Parish, Talsi Municipality, Latvia) in the household of Livonian fisherman Oskars and his Estonian wife Minna Cerbaha. She and her sister Elfrīda grew up speaking Livonian, Estonian, and Latvian.

During World War I, her family lived in Estonia, where Grīva began school. After the war, she studied in Mazirbe elementary school and later in Ventspils, where she began private violin lessons. In 1927, through the help of linguists Oskar Loorits and Lauri Kettunen, she was sent to study in Finland. There she attended the Tūsola Folk High School, studying Finnish language and receiving private piano instruction from the daughter of composer Jean Sibelius. She also studied voice at the Helsinki Academy (now Sibelius Academy). In 1928, she continued her teacher's training at the Heinola Teacher Institute, then at the Jelgava Teacher Institute, graduating in 1934.

== Cultural and musical work ==
While still studying in Jelgava, Grīva co-founded the Livonian-language monthly Līvli alongside Pēteris Dambergs and Alise Gūtmanis, writing and translating articles from Finnish.

After graduation, she taught in Ventspils and other Latvian schools. She later completed studies at the Ventspils Music School, then taught violin and piano at the Talsi Music School and directed the choir of the Talsi Lutheran Church. She also continued contributing to Līvli and participated in developing Livonian educational materials.

== Livonian revival and Kāndla ==
Grīva was a skilled singer with a strong voice, and in 1939 she gave a solo performance at the opening of the Livonian People’s House in Mazirbe.

In the 1960s, she helped compile a handwritten Esperanto–Latvian–Livonian dictionary and assisted Latvian composer Andrejs Krūmiņš in recording Livonian folk melodies. In 1966, she appeared in the Estonian documentary On the Livonian Coast (Estonian: Liivi rannal), which documented Livonian life on the Livonian (Kurzeme) coast.

In 1972, she co-founded the Livonian folklore ensemble "Kāndla" in Ventspils and served as its artistic director. Despite health difficulties and deteriorating hearing in her final years, she remained active with the ensemble until her death.

== Personal life ==
In 1956, she married Paulis Grīva, a Dundaga native who had returned from deportation in Siberia. Their marriage was short-lived, as he died soon afterward.

Grīva maintained a 35-year correspondence with linguist Lauri Kettunen (1928–1963), which is preserved. She died in Ventspils in 1984 and is buried in Sīkrags cemetery.

== Legacy ==
Hilda Grīva is regarded as one of the most significant Livonian cultural figures of the 20th century. Her recordings and oral contributions are preserved at the Digital Archives of Latvian Folklore.

Only in the 1970s did the Livonian community and cultural life resume its activities under the Soviet era. This is because the Livonian ethnographic ensembles Livlist in Riga, Latvia (whose first conductor was Dzidra Kļaviņa) and Kāndla in Ventspils (which is Hilda Grīva) were established in 1972 by Emma Ērenštreite's suggestion. These were put in place to protect and advance the Livonian language and musical culture.
