= Roja Municipality =

Municipality of Latvia

Coordinates: 57°30′30″N 22°48′33″E

Roja Municipality Rojas novads
- Municipality
- Flag Coat of arms

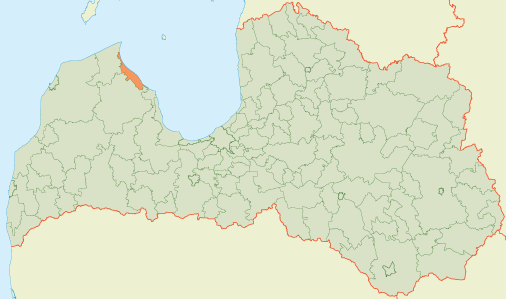
- Country: Latvia
- Formed: 2009
- Centre: Roja, Latvia

Government
  - Council Chair: Eva Kārkliņa (LZP)

Area
  - Total: 200.61 km^{2} (77.46 sq mi)
  - Land: 196.95 km^{2} (76.04 sq mi)
  - Water: 3.66 km^{2} (1.41 sq mi)

Population (2021)
  - Total: 3,390
  - Density: 17.2/km^{2} (44.6/sq mi)
- Website: www.roja.lv

Roja Municipality (Latvian: Rojas novads, Livonian: Rūoj mōgõn) was a former municipality in Courland, Latvia. The municipality was formed in 2009 by merging Mērsrags parish and Roja parish the administrative centre being Roja. Since 2010 a separate Mērsrags municipality has been created. The population in 2020 was 3,368.

On 1 July 2021, Roja Municipality ceased to exist and its territory was merged into Talsi Municipality.

== See also ==
- Administrative divisions of Latvia (2009)
