= Ķūļciems Parish =

Parish of Latvia

- parish of Latvia
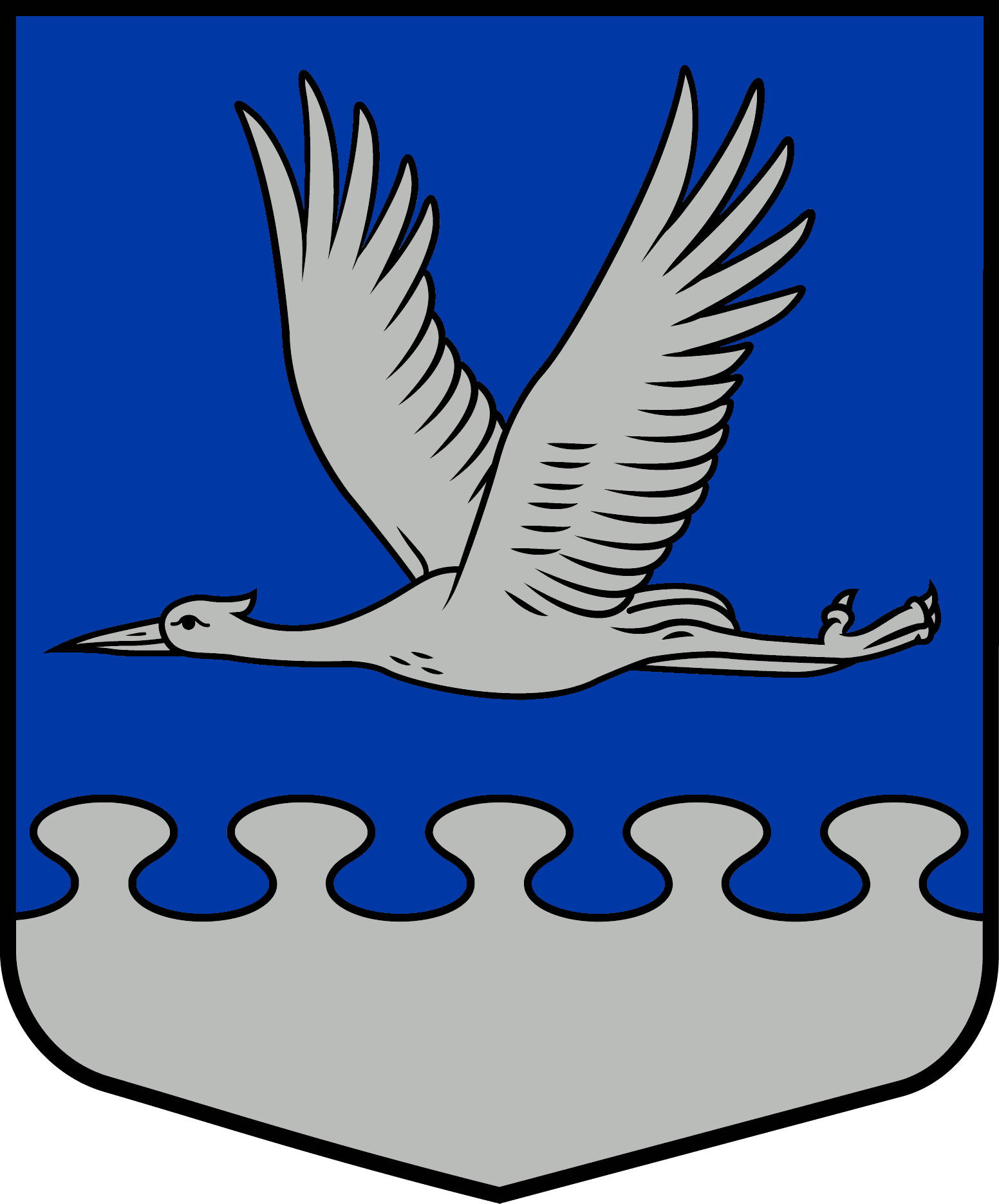
- Coat of arms

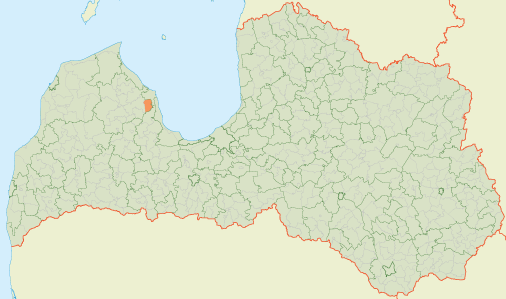
- Coordinates: 57°14′34″N 23°00′45″E
- Country: Latvia

Population (1 January 2026)
  - Total: 305
- Time zone: Eastern European Time
- Postal code: LV-3283
- Website: https://talsunovads.lv/pasvaldiba/talsu-novads/kulciema-pagasts/

Ķūļciems parish (Latvian: Ķūļciema pagasts) is an administrative unit of the Talsi Municipality, Latvia.

== Towns, villages and settlements of Ķūļciems parish ==
- Ķūļciems
- Dzedri
- Krievragciems
- Jādekšas
