= Valdgale Parish =

Parish of Latvia

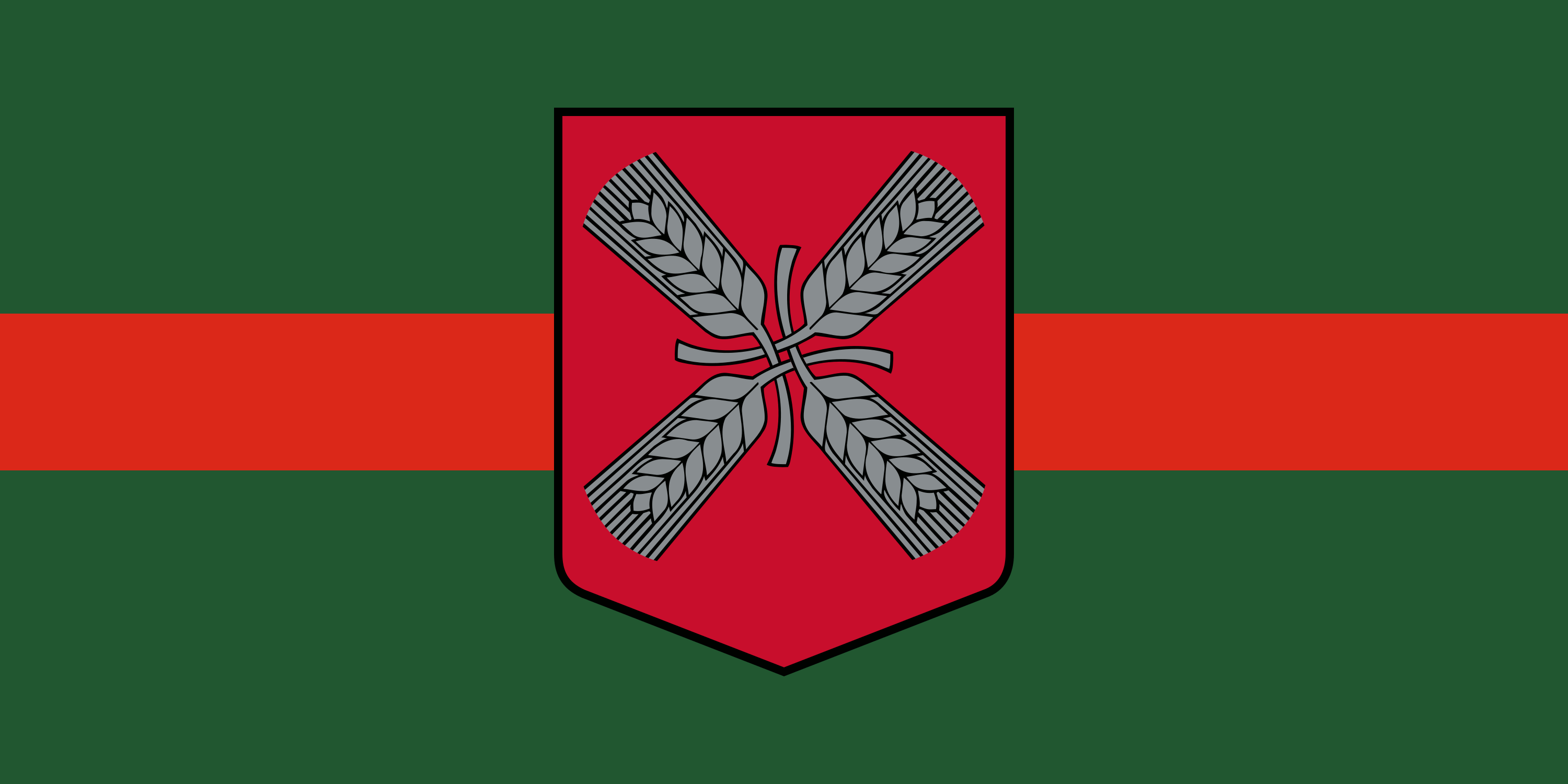
- Flag Coat of arms
- Interactive map of Valdgale Parish
- Coordinates: 57°21′07″N 22°24′28″E
- Country: Latvia
- Municipality: Talsi

Area
  - Total: 205.2 km^{2} (79.2 sq mi)

Population (1 January 2026)
  - Total: 1,069
  - Density: 5.210/km^{2} (13.49/sq mi)
- Time zone: Eastern European Time
- Postal code: LV-3253
- Website: www.valdgale.lv

Valdgale parish (Latvian: Valdgales pagasts) is situated in Talsi Municipality in Latvia. It is located approximately 13 km from the city of Talsi, 4 km from Valdemārpils and 20 km from Dundaga. The centre of Valdgale parish is called Pūņas, from where it is about 5 km to the birthplace of the renowned editor and politician Krišjānis Valdemārs. Valdgale has its own elementary school, shops, local authority building and more.
