= Balgale Parish =

Parish of Latvia

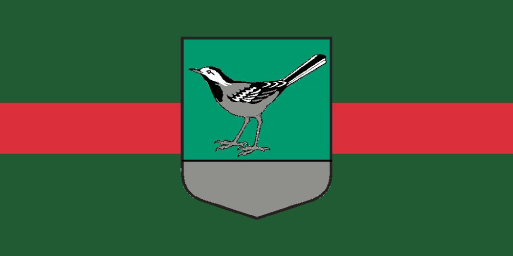
- Flag Coat of arms

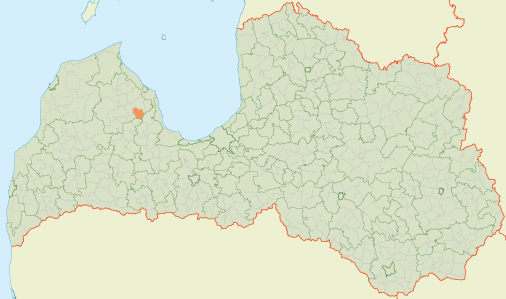
- Interactive map of Balgale Parish
- Coordinates: 57°10′58″N 22°52′27″E
- Country: Latvia
- Municipality: Talsi

Area
  - Total: 73 km^{2} (28 sq mi)

Population (1 January 2026)
  - Total: 721
  - Density: 9.9/km^{2} (26/sq mi)
- Time zone: Eastern European Time
- Postal code: LV-3287

Balgale Parish (Latvian: Balgales pagasts) is an administrative unit of Talsi Municipality, Latvia.

== Towns, villages and settlements of Balgale parish ==
- Dursupe – parish administrative center

== Notable people ==
- Uģis Brūvelis

== See also ==
- Dursupe Manor
