= Edgar Vaalgamaa =

Livonian ethnologist (1912–2003)

Edgar Vaalgamaa (Latvian: Edgars Vālgamā; 1912 – December 20, 2003) was a Livonian pastor and ethnologist.

Vaalgamaa was born in Košrags on the northern coast of Courland. Like many other Livonians, his family made their living from fishing. Edgar Vaalgamaa, however, didn't want to be a fisherman but went to study theology at the University of Helsinki in 1934. He graduated in 1939 but was unable to return because of World War II. Edgar stayed in Finland and volunteered in the Continuation War. After the war, he worked as a Lutheran pastor in several different churches. At the same time, he translated the Latvian epic poem "Lāčplēsis" into Finnish. Later he wrote the book Valkoisen hiekan kansa, which is one of the largest books about the Livonian people's history and culture. Edgar Vaalgamaa died in 2003, but the Vaalgamaa family still lives in Finland.
