= Krišjānis Valdemārs =

Latvian writer

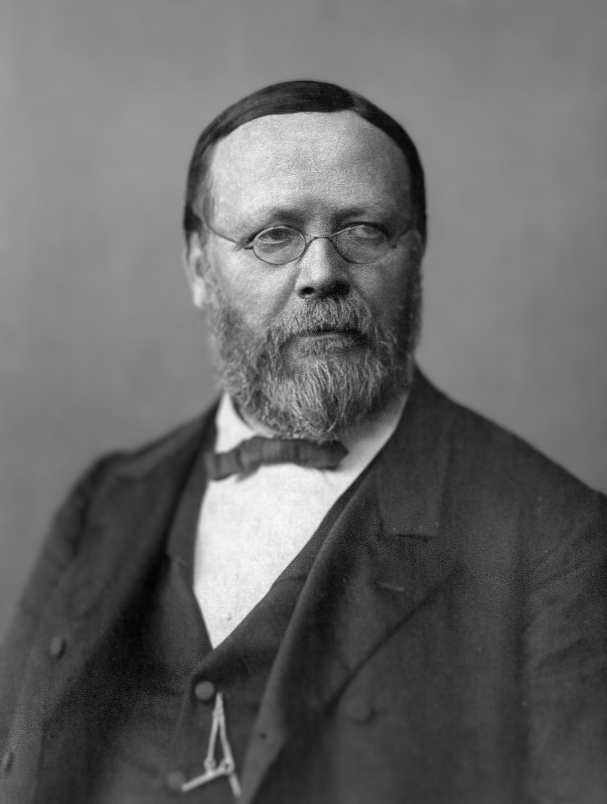
- Born: 2 December 1825; Ārlava parish, Russian Empire (now Valdgale parish, Courland, Latvia)
- Died: 7 December 1891 (aged 66); Moscow, Russian Empire (now Russia)
- Occupations: Editor, politician, folklorist
- Movement: Young Latvians

Krišjānis Valdemārs (in Germanized spelling as Christian Waldemar or Woldemar) (2 December 1825 at Vecjunkuri in Ārlava parish (now Valdgale parish, Courland, Latvia) – 7 December 1891 in Moscow, Russia) was a writer, editor, educator, politician, lexicographer, folklorist and economist, the spiritual leader of The First Latvian National Awakening and the most prominent member of the Young Latvians movement.

== Biography ==
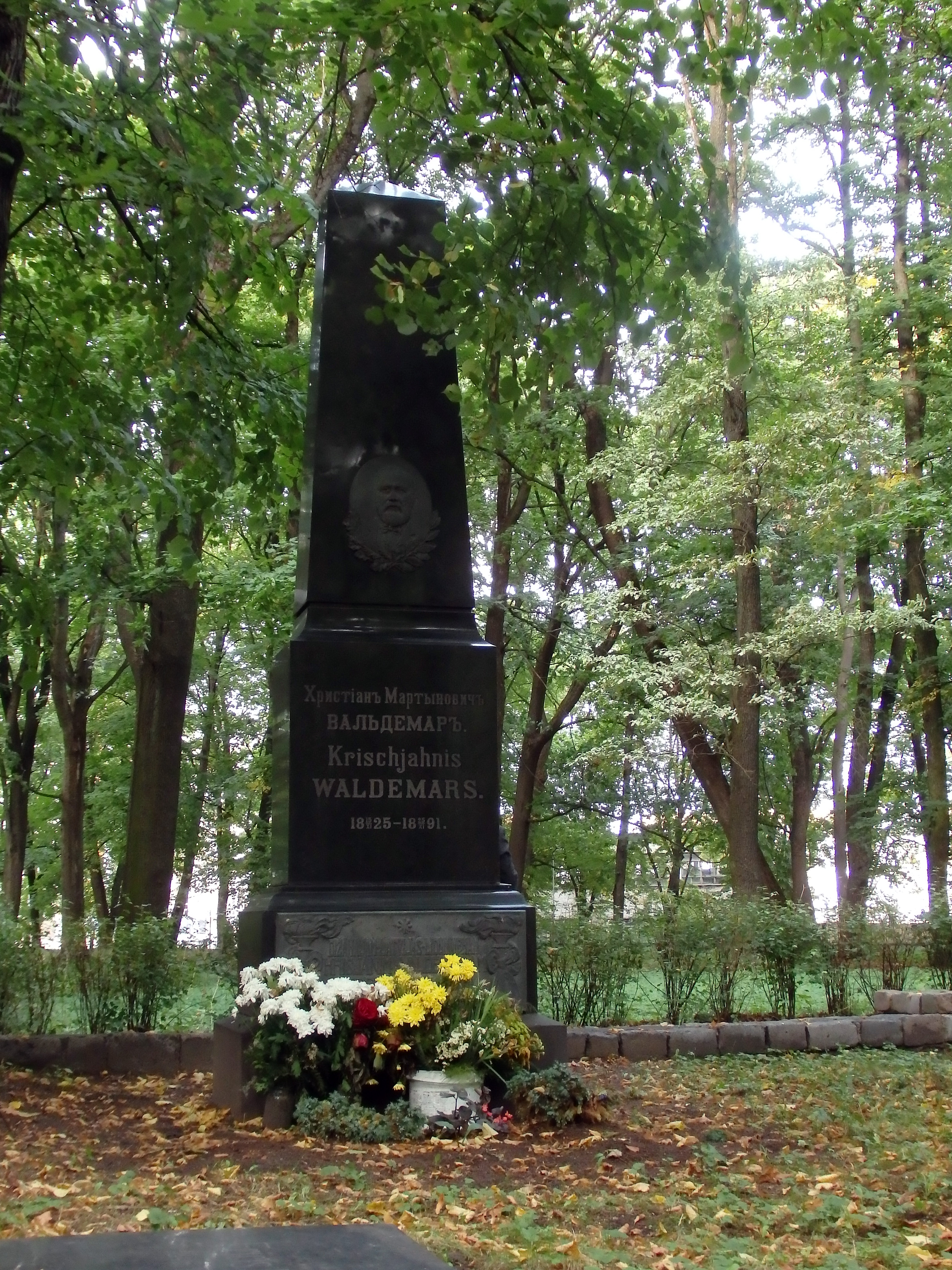
Valdemār's grave in the Great Cemetery of Riga

Krišjānis Valdemārs was born on 2 December 1825 at Vecjunkuri homestead, Ārlava parish (now Valdgale parish, Courland, Latvia). He was the son of a Lutheran curate Mārtiņš Valdemārs. He graduated from local parish school and worked as a teacher in Sasmaka (now named Valdemārpils in his honor). Later he worked as a parish secretary in Rundāle and Ēdole parish.

In 1854 he graduated from gymnasium in Liepāja and started his studies at the University of Tartu (then Dorpat). His main subject and interest were economics. While studying there he became known with the first public declaration of Latvian nationality. He affixed a visiting card to his door that read "C. Woldemar stud. cam. Latweetis." At the time, it was almost unheard of for an educated person to call himself a Latvian; education meant Germanisation, and Valdemārs' act has been compared with Martin Luther's posting of the 95 Theses at the door of the Castle Church in Wittenberg in its importance for the birth of Latvian nationalism. Valdemārs is seen as the spiritual father of the First Awakening. With Juris Alunāns, he led Latvian student gatherings while in Tartu and advocated the study of folklore.

After graduation in 1858 he moved to St Petersburg and worked as a clerk in Ministry of Finance. Also he was a correspondent in local German-language newspaper St. Petersburgische Zeitung.

In 1862 he became editor and main publisher of the Latvian newspaper Pēterburgas Avīzes which was hitherto the most radical Latvian newspaper. It strongly opposed Baltic German rule and the remnants of feudalism in Baltic provinces. The newspaper became the main platform for Young Latvian ideas. It was closed by the Russian authorities in 1865.

In 1864 Valdemārs helped establish the first Latvian naval school in Ainaži as a way of making Latvians rich. At its opening he uttered the famous phrase "Brauciet, latvji, jūriņā, krājiet zeltu pūriņā!" (Latvians, sail the seas, stuff your dowry with gold). Many other Latvian naval schools was established during the next years in the coastal towns of Latvia. It had big influence on local economy and culture because hundreds of Latvian peasant sons had a chance to get education for free and become captains or steersmen. It led to the "Age of Sailors" in Latvia as active shipbuilding started in coastal towns and villages and those Latvian-built, Latvian-owned and -crewed ships became the first national merchant fleet which was even involved in trans-Atlantic voyages.

Valdemārs published a Latvian-Russian-German dictionary in 1879.

In later life Valdemārs was mostly involved in polemics with Baltic Germans, popularized seafaring and edited the first Latvian naval dictionary.

Valdemārs died on 7 December 1891 in Moscow. He is buried in Riga's Great Cemetery. One of the main streets in Riga is named after him.
