= Īve Parish =

Parish of Latvia

- parish of Latvia
- Coat of arms

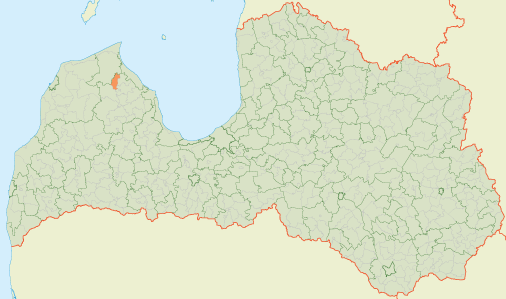
- Coordinates: 57°26′17″N 22°31′14″E
- Country: Latvia

Population (1 January 2026)
  - Total: 364
- Time zone: Eastern European Time
- Postal code: LV-3261

Īve parish (Latvian: Īves pagasts) is an administrative unit of Talsi Municipality in the Courland region of Latvia. The parish center is located in Tiņģere.

== Towns, villages and settlements of Īve parish ==
- Dūmciems
- Grodnieki
- Īve
- Kalnmuiža
- Ķurbe
- Ozolmuiža
- Silmuiža
- Silciems
- Tiņģere

== See also ==
- Tiņģere Manor
