= Laidze Parish =

Latvian municipality

- parish of Latvia
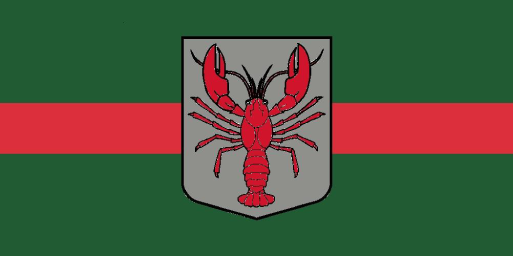
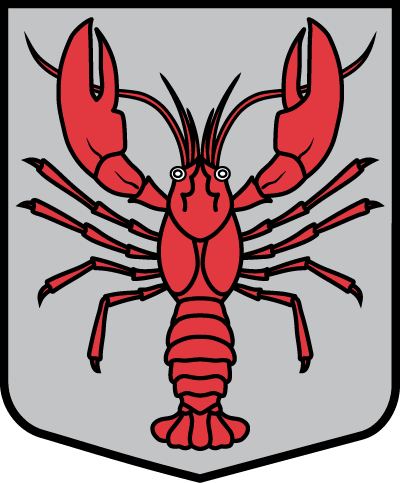
- Flag Coat of arms

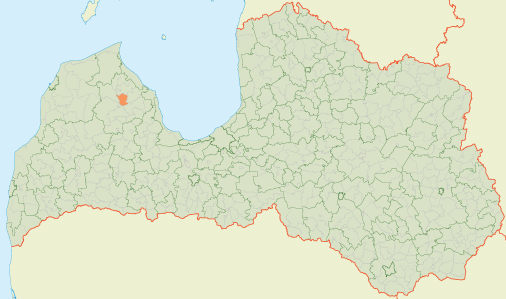
- Coordinates: 57°17′34″N 22°38′17″E
- Country: Latvia

Population (1 January 2026)
  - Total: 1,595
- Time zone: Eastern European Time
- Postal codes: LV-3201, LV-3280

Laidze parish (Latvian: Laidzes pagasts) is an administrative unit of Talsi Municipality, Latvia.
