= Valdemārpils =

Town in Talsi Municipality, Latvia

- Town
- Flag Coat of arms

- Location in Latvia
- Coordinates: 57°22′N 22°35′E
- Country: Latvia
- Municipality: Talsi Municipality
- Town rights: 1917

Area
  - Total: 3.84 km^{2} (1.48 sq mi)
  - Land: 3.80 km^{2} (1.47 sq mi)
  - Water: 0.04 km^{2} (0.015 sq mi)

Population (2026)
  - Total: 1,122
  - Density: 295/km^{2} (765/sq mi)
- Time zone: UTC+2 (EET)
  - Summer (DST): UTC+3 (EEST)
- Postal code: LV-3260
- Calling code: +371 632
- Website: http://www.valdemarpils.lv/

Valdemārpils (German: Saßmacken, Yiddish: שאַסמאַקען, romanized: Shasmaken) (called Sasmaka until 1926) is a town in the Courland region of Latvia, in Talsi Municipality. The town is named after Krišjānis Valdemārs, born in nearby Valdgale parish (then part of Ārlava parish), who was one of the leaders of the First Latvian National Awakening. He is celebrated in the town with a memorial stone. Famous Jewish bibliographer and book collector Ephraim Deinard was born here in 1846.

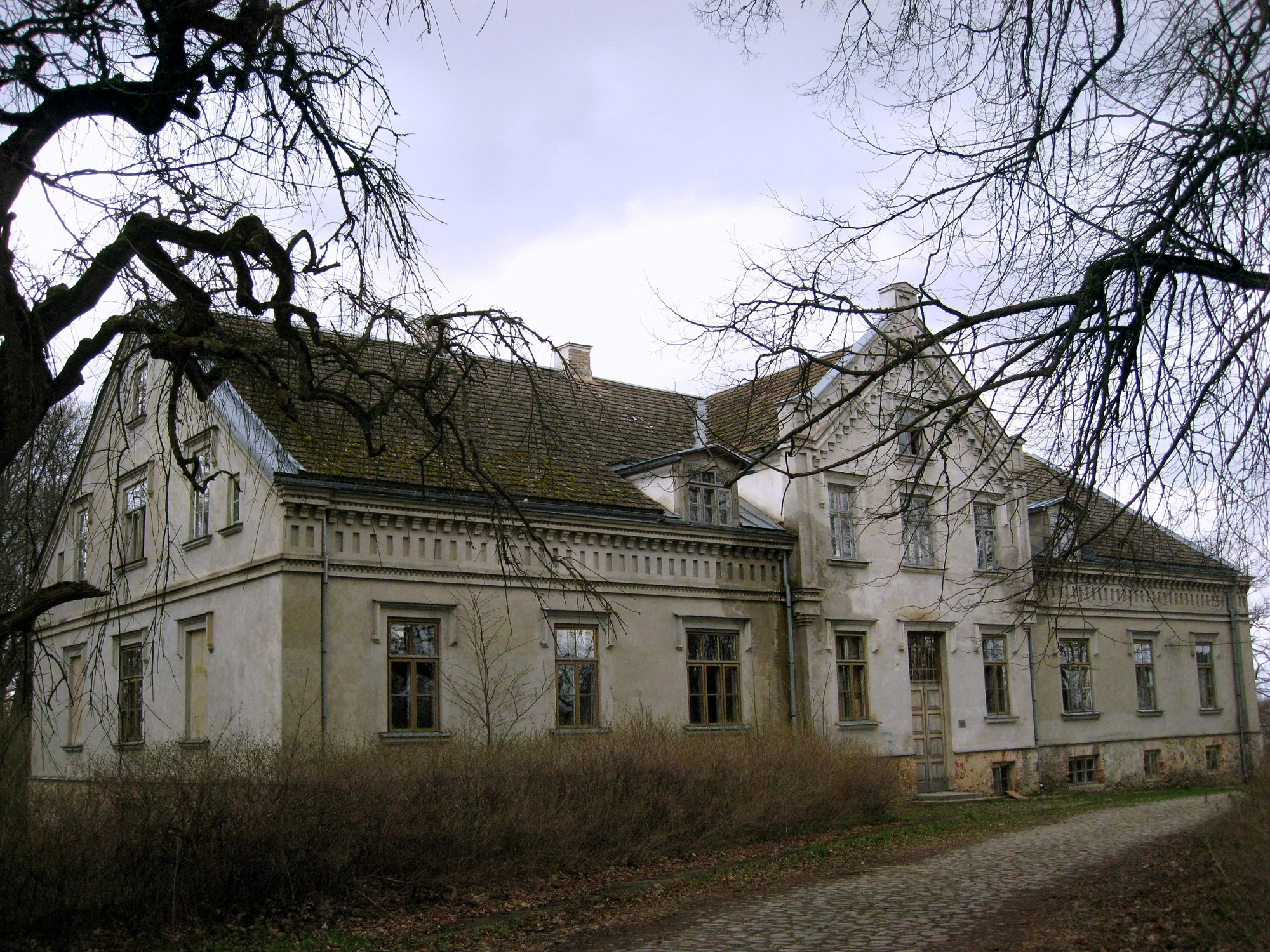
Sasmaka manor

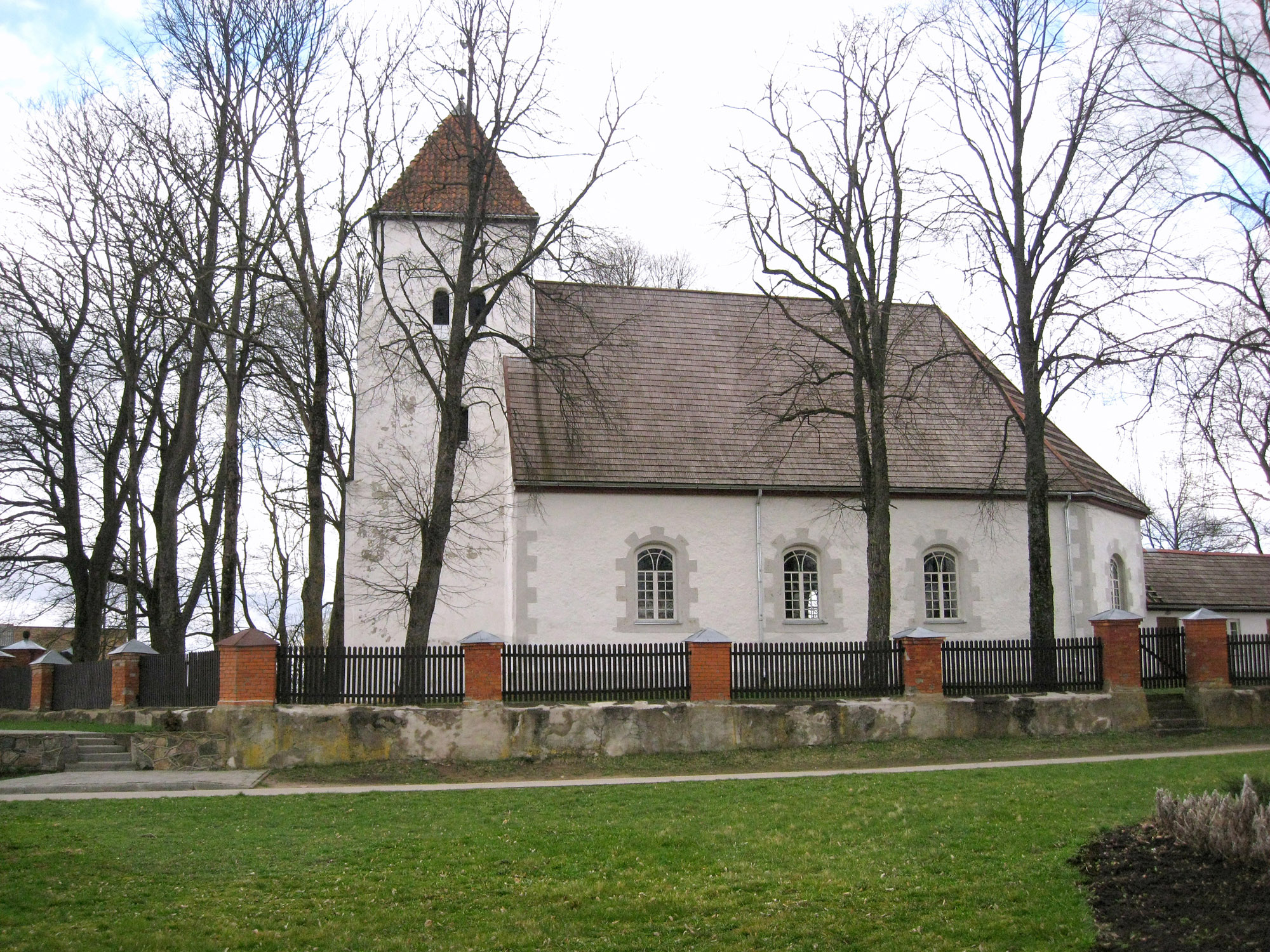
Lutheran church in Valdemārpils

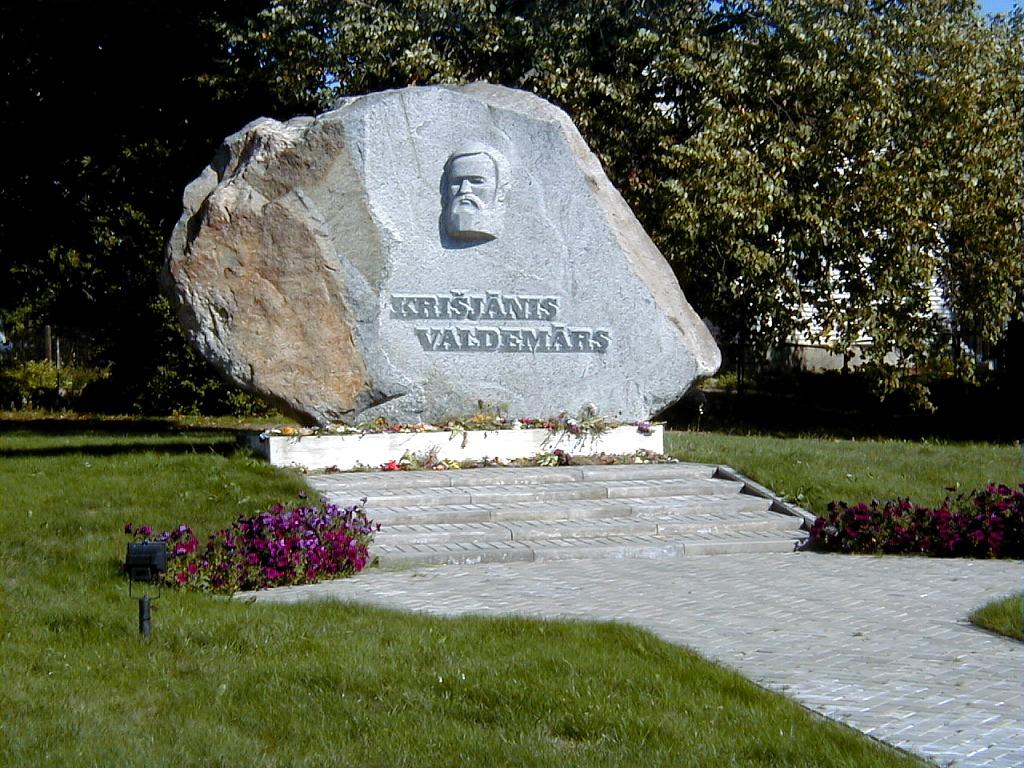
Monument to Krišjānis Valdemārs

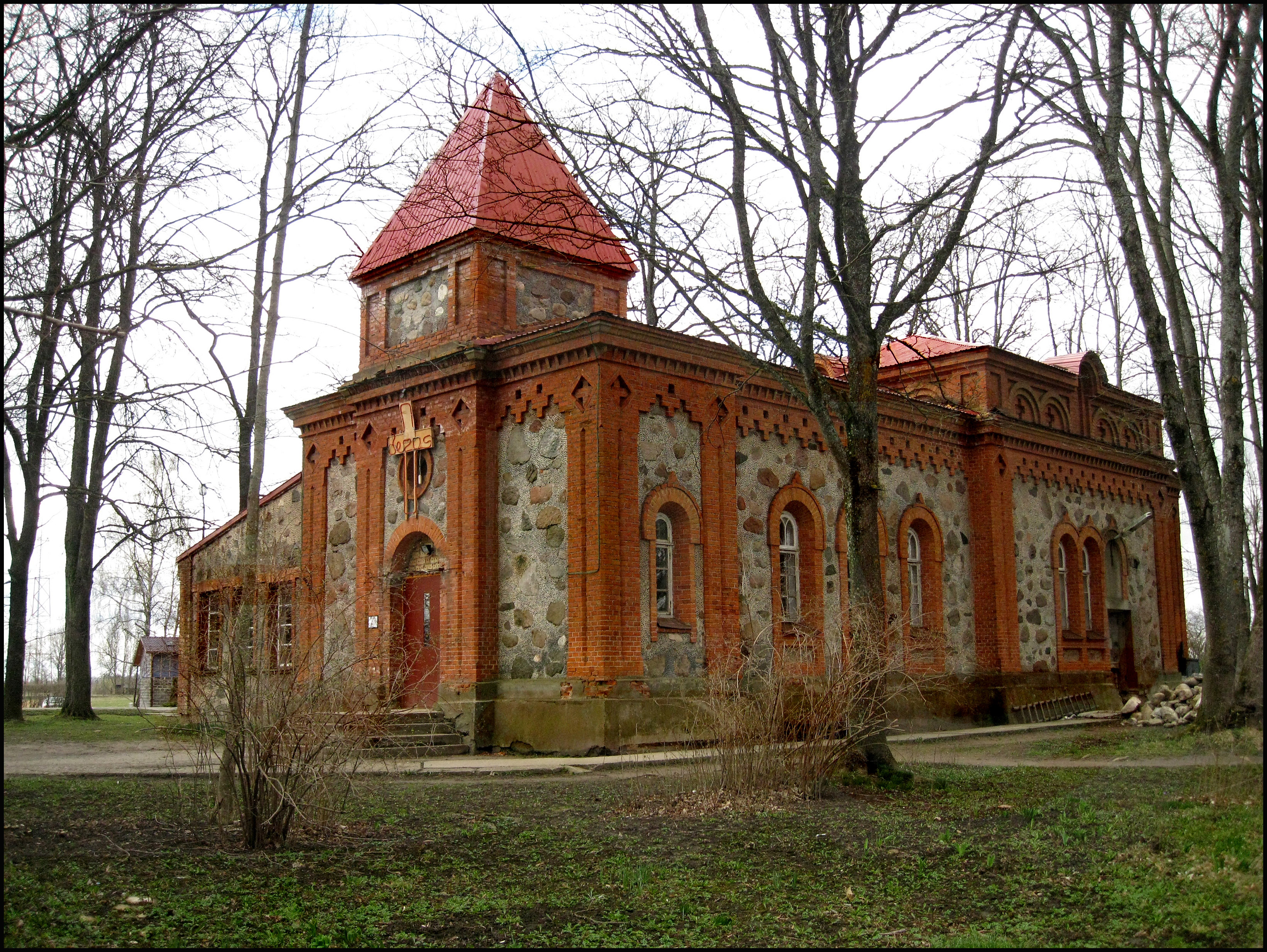
Pentecostal church in Valdemārpils
