= Pētõr Damberg =

Livonian linguist, poet and teacher

Pētõr Damberg (Latvian: Pēteris Dambergs, Russian: Пётр Дамберг (Russian pronunciation: [ˈpʲɵtr ˈdamʲbʲɪrk]); March 9, 1909, Sīkrags – April 25, 1987) was a Latvian Livonian linguist, poet and teacher.

He graduated from a teacher's school in Jelgava and worked as a Livonian language teacher. He worked on developing Livonian grammar, wrote several poems in Livonian and translated books into Livonian. His most important works were Livonian school books, which became the most common Livonian language books in use for teaching. After World War II he worked as a private teacher. He died on April 25, 1987, and was buried in a graveyard in Baltezers.
