= Lube Parish =

Parish of Latvia

- parish of Latvia
- Coat of arms

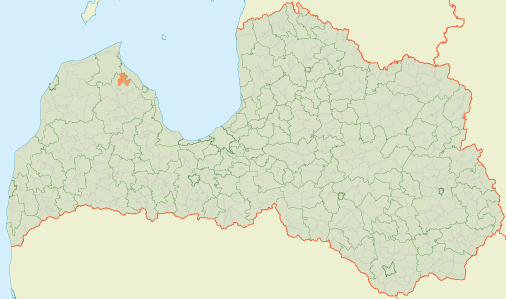
- Coordinates: 57°27′15″N 22°38′56″E
- Country: Latvia

Population (1 January 2026)
  - Total: 411
- Time zone: Eastern European Time
- Postal code: LV-3262

Lube Parish (Latvian: Lubes pagasts) is an administrative unit of Talsi Municipality, Latvia.

== Towns, villages and settlements of Lube parish ==
- Anuži – parish administrative center
