= Strazde Parish =

Parish of Latvia

- parish of Latvia
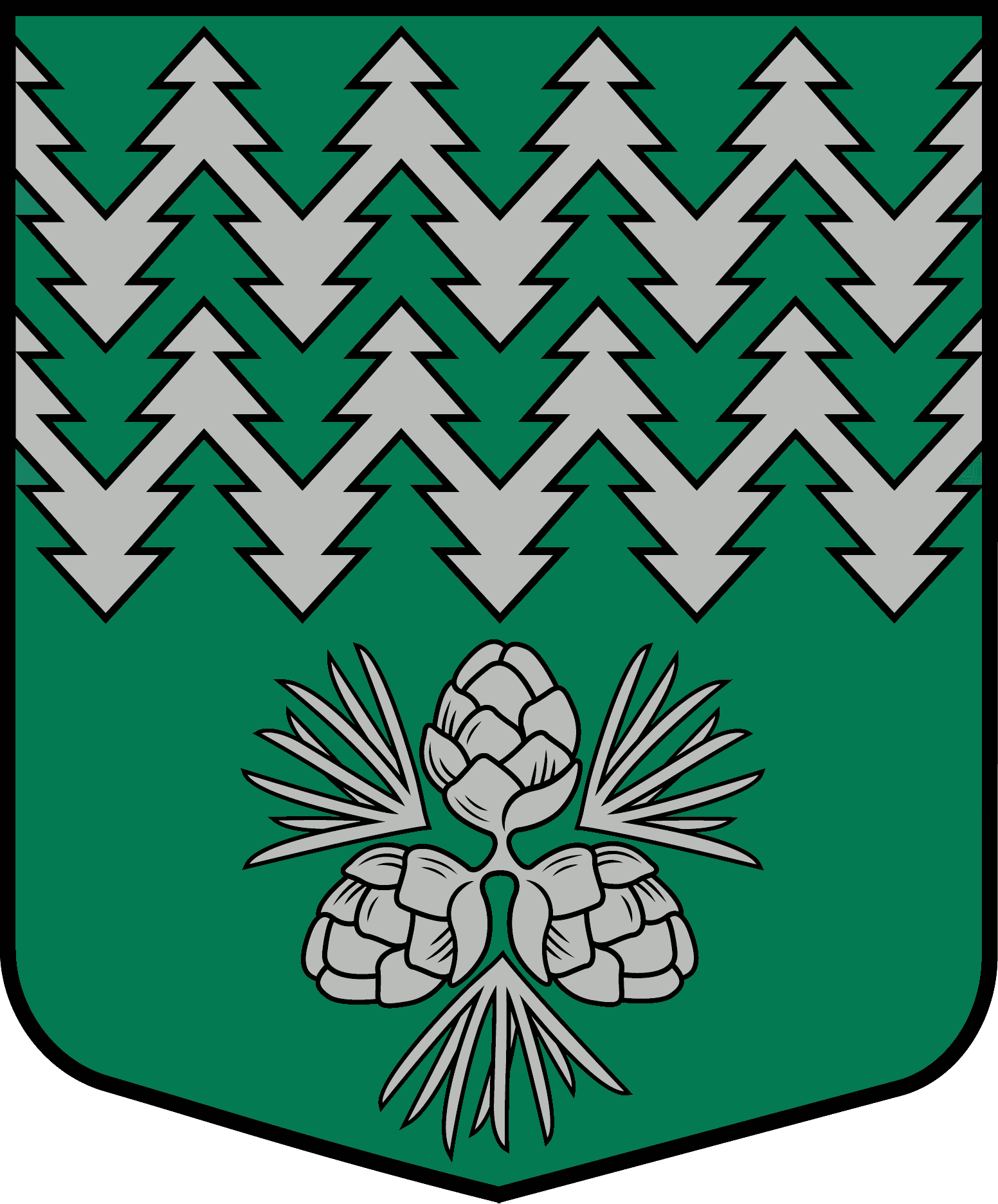
- Coat of arms

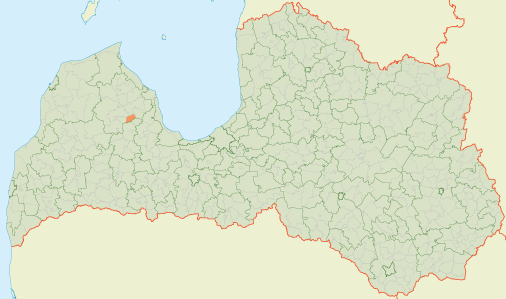
- Coordinates: 57°08′21″N 22°45′20″E
- Country: Latvia

Population (1 January 2026)
  - Total: 314
- Time zone: Eastern European Time
- Postal code: LV-3291

Strazde Parish (Latvian: Strazdes pagasts) is an administrative unit of Talsi Municipality in the Courland region of Latvia.

== Towns, villages and settlements of Strazde parish ==
- Strazde – parish administrative center.
