= Virbi Parish =

Parish of Latvia

- parish of Latvia
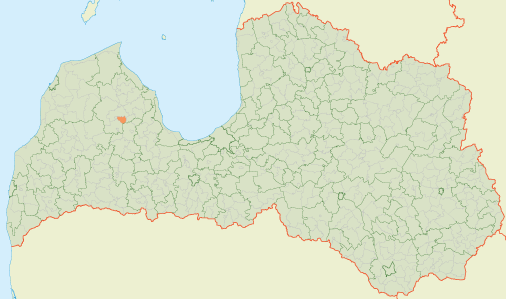

- Coat of arms

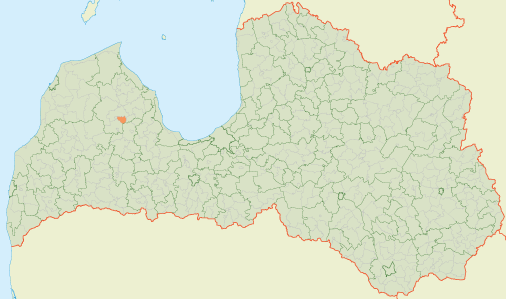
- Coordinates: 57°07′47″N 22°37′57″E
- Country: Latvia

Population (1 January 2026)
  - Total: 734
- Time zone: Eastern European Time
- Postal code: LV-3292

Virbi parish (Latvian: Virbu pagasts) is an administrative unit of Talsi Municipality, Latvia.

== Towns, villages and settlements of Virbi parish ==
- Jaunpagasts – parish administrative center
