= Roja Port =

Port in Latvia

- Click on the map for a fullscreen view

Location
- Country: Latvia
- Coordinates: 57°30′28″N 22°48′13″E

Statistics
- Website www.rojaport.lv

Roja Port (Latvian: Rojas osta) is the port authority of Roja, Latvia. The port is located at the mouth of Roja River.
