= Sabile Station =

Latvian railway station

Sabile

General information
- Coordinates: 57°7′56.99″N 22°39′0.09″E
- System: LDz commuter/freight
- Line: Ventspils I – Tukums II
- Platforms: 1
- Tracks: 5

History
- Opened: 1924; 102 years ago
Route map
Location

Sabile Station is a railway station on the Ventspils I – Tukums II Railway.
