= Ģibuļi Parish =

Parish of Latvia

- parish of Latvia
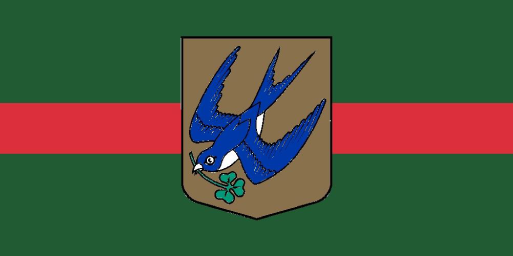
- Flag Coat of arms

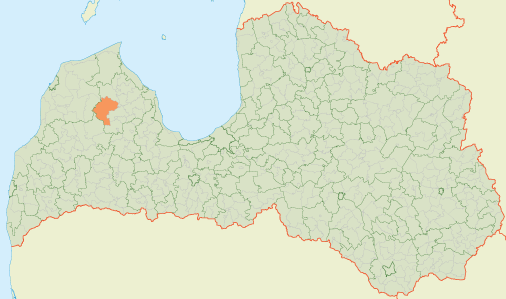
- Coordinates: 57°12′28″N 22°22′39″E
- Country: Latvia

Population (1 January 2026)
  - Total: 2,208
- Time zone: Eastern European Time
- Postal codes: LV-3201, LV-3251, LV-3294, LV-3297, LV-3298

Ģibuļi Parish (Latvian: Ģibuļu pagasts) is an administrative unit of Talsi Municipality, Latvia. Its population is 2,185.

== Towns, villages and settlements of Ģibuļi Parish ==
Type	Name	Population (2008)
Large village	Pastende	844
Mid-sized village	Aizupes	54
Mid-sized village	Spāre	384
Small village	Arkliņi	25
Small village	Dravnieki	<10
Small village	Ģibuļi	33
Small village	Iliņi	11
Small village	Jaunzemes	51
Small village	Kaleši	24
Small village	Kraujas	26
Small village	Kurši	43
Small village	Līči	43
Small village	Mazspāre	9
Small village	Mordanga	15
Small village	Turkmuiža	15
Scattered village	Gaviļnieki	33
Scattered village	Kaļķciems	16
Scattered village	Kāņciems	15
Scattered village	Ruņķi	15
Scattered village	Talsciems	85
