= Lībagi Parish =

Parish of Latvia

- parish of Latvia
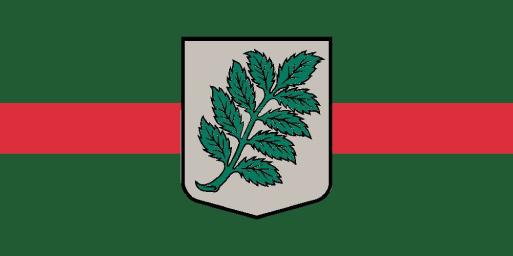
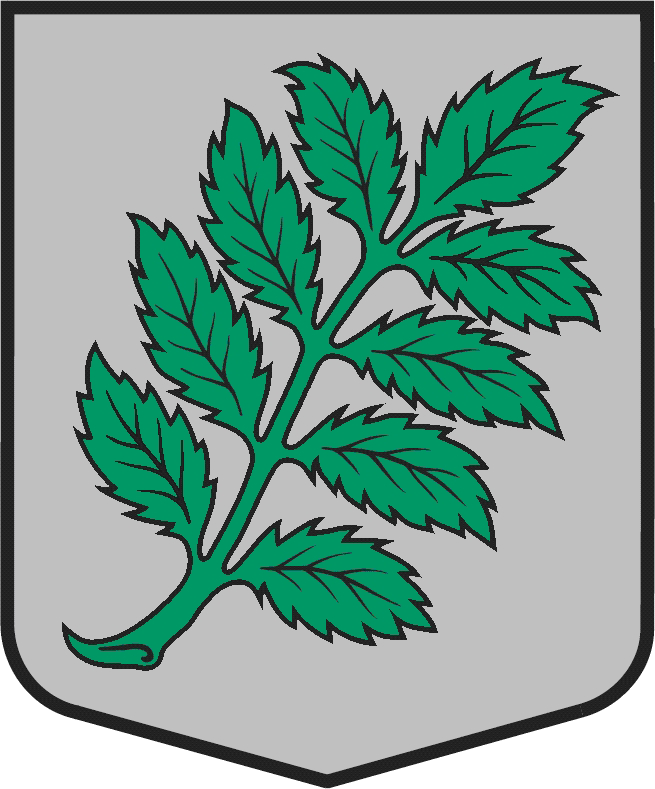
- Flag Coat of arms

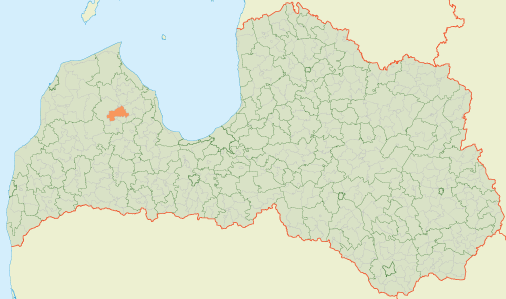
- Coordinates: 57°10′34″N 22°33′45″E
- Country: Latvia

Population (1 January 2026)
  - Total: 1,734
- Time zone: Eastern European Time
- Postal codes: LV-3201, LV-3257, LV-3258

Lībagi Parish (Latvian: Lībagu pagasts) is an administrative unit of Talsi Municipality in the Courland region of Latvia.

== Towns, villages and settlements of Lībagi parish ==
- Mundigciems — parish administrative center
