= Vandzene Parish =

Parish of Latvia

- parish of Latvia
- Flag Coat of arms

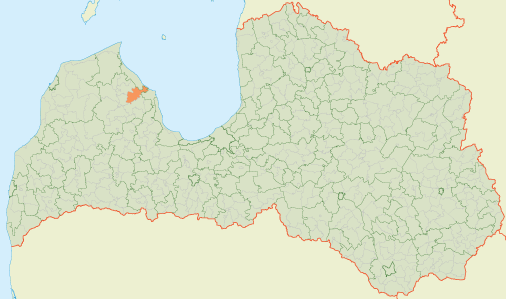
- Coordinates: 57°20′10″N 22°49′29″E
- Country: Latvia

Population (1 January 2026)
  - Total: 1,380
- Time zone: Eastern European Time
- Postal codes: LV-3281, LV-3284

Vandzene Parish (Latvian: Vandzenes pagasts) is an administrative unit of Talsi Municipality in the Courland region of Latvia.

== Towns, villages and settlements of Vandzene parish ==
- Vandzene
