= Roja Parish =

Parish of Latvia

- parish of Latvia
- Flag Coat of arms

- Coordinates: 57°30′30″N 22°48′33″E
- Country: Latvia

Population (1 January 2026)
  - Total: 3,183
- Time zone: Eastern European Time
- Postal codes: LV-3264, LV-3284

Roja Parish (Latvian: Rojas pagasts) is an administrative unit of Talsi Municipality in the Courland region of Latvia. From 2009 until 2021, it was part of the former Roja Municipality.

== Towns, villages and settlements of Roja parish ==
Administrative center of Roja alongside Rude, Kaltene, Melnsils, Ģipka, Valgalciems, Žocene and Purciems. There's also smaller settlements all across the Parish.
