= Stende Station =

Railway station in Latvia

Stende

General information
- Coordinates: 57°8′38.32″N 22°32′16.24″E
- System: LDz commuter
- Line: Ventspils I – Tukums II
- Platforms: 2

Construction
- Architect: Artūrs Mēdlingers (1923)

History
- Opened: September 11, 1901
- Rebuilt: 1923; 103 years ago
Route map
Location

Stende Station is a railway station on the Ventspils I – Tukums II Railway.
