= Talsi Municipality =

Municipality of Latvia

Coordinates: 57°15′N 22°36′E

Talsi Municipality Talsu novads Tālsa mōgõn
- Municipality
- Flag Coat of arms

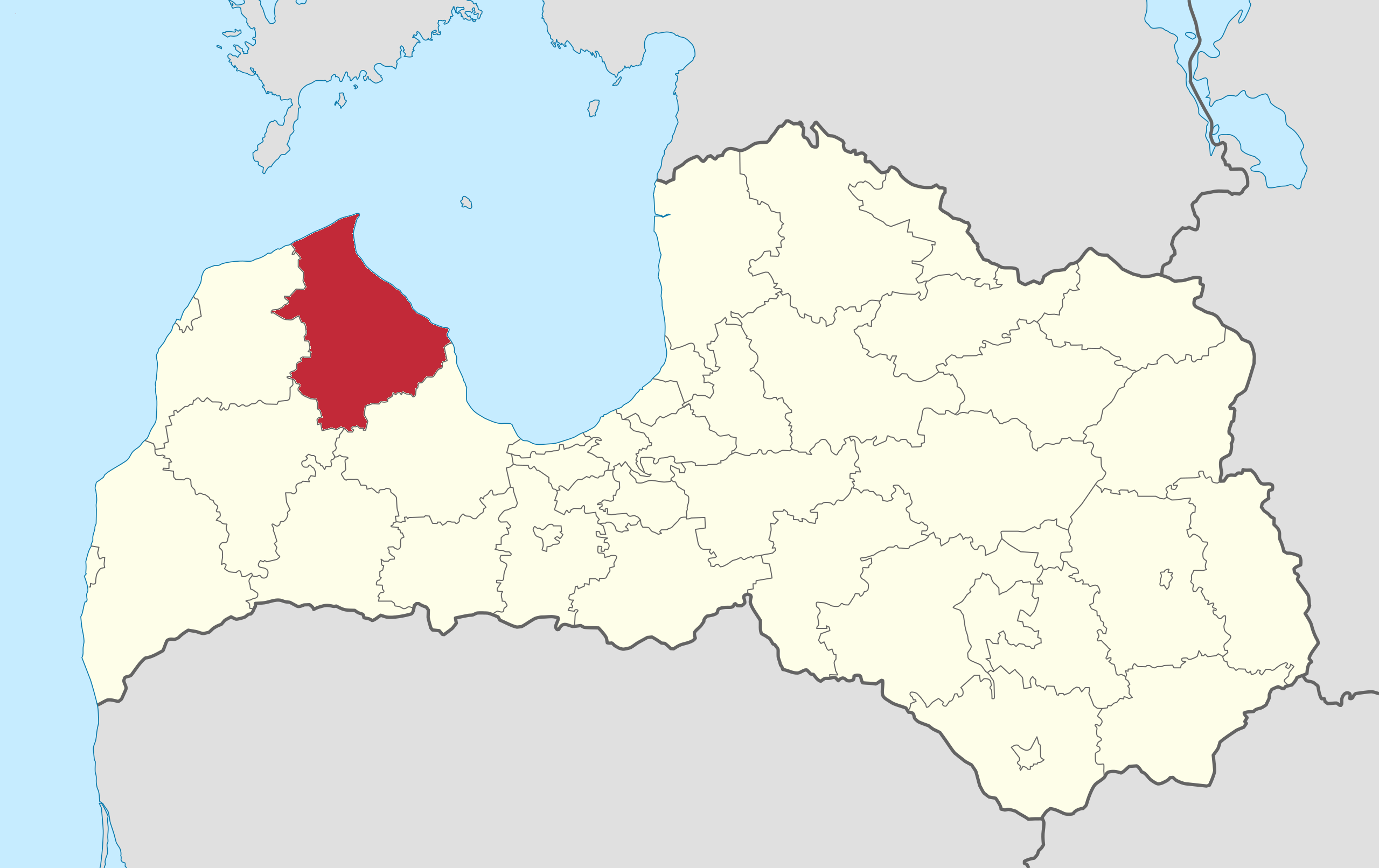

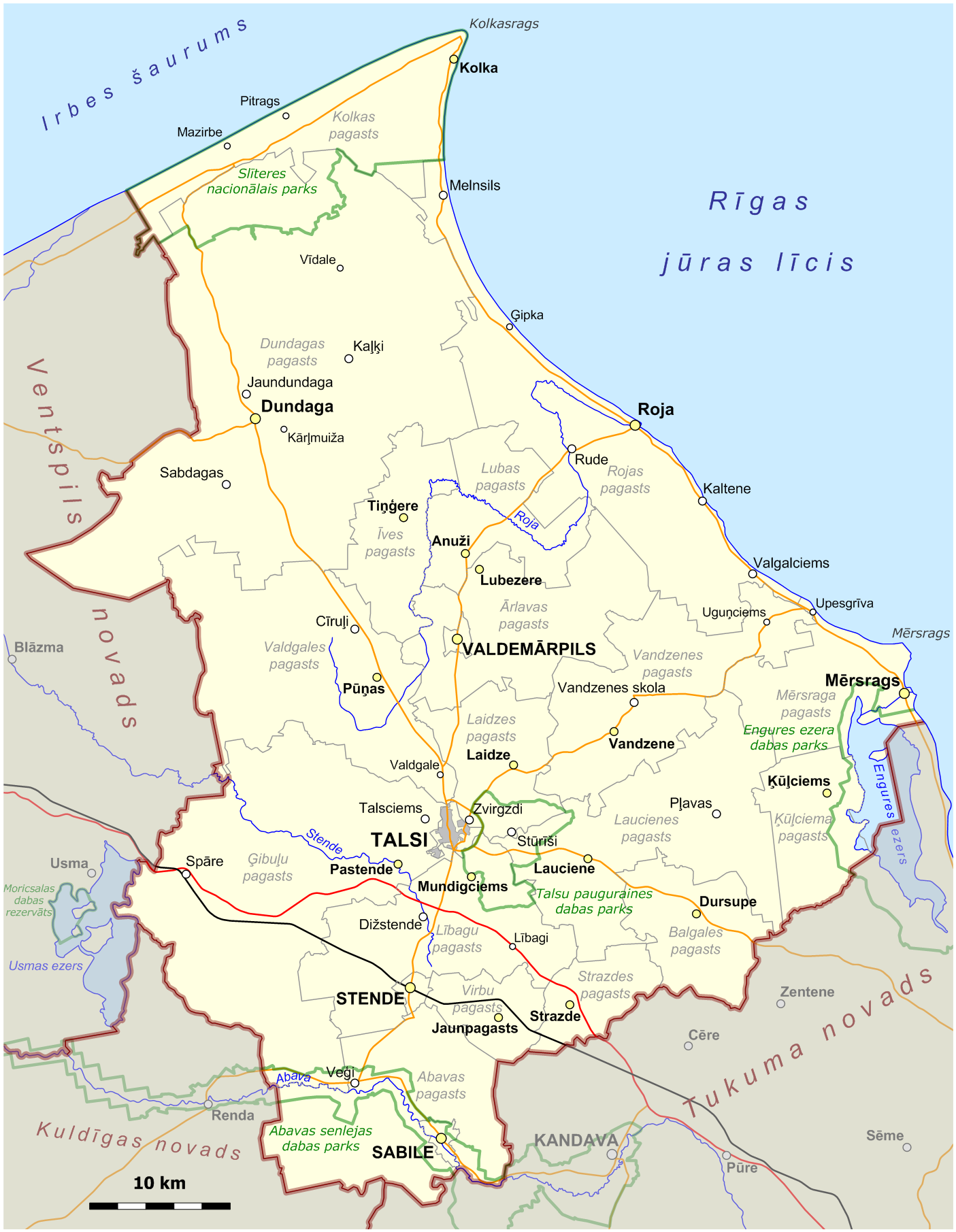
- Country: Latvia
- Formed: 2009
- Reformed: 2021
- Centre: Talsi

Government
  - Council Chair: Ansis Bērziņš (LA)

Area
  - Total: 2,750.8 km^{2} (1,062.1 sq mi)
  - Land: 2,674.3 km^{2} (1,032.6 sq mi)
  - Water: 76.5 km^{2} (29.5 sq mi)

Population
  - Total: 35,194
  - Density: 13.160/km^{2} (34.084/sq mi)
- Website: talsunovads.lv

Talsi Municipality (Latvian: Talsu novads; Livonian: Tālsa mōgõn) is a municipality in Courland, Latvia. The municipality was formed in 2009 by merging Abava parish, Balgale parish, Ģibuļi parish, Īve parish, Ķūļciems parish, Laidze parish, Lauciene parish, Lībagi parish, Lube parish, Strazde parish, Valdgale parish, Vandzene parish, Virbi parish, Talsi town, Stende town, Sabile town and Valdemārpils town with its countryside territory. In 2021 the municipality was expanded to include the former Dundaga municipality, Mērsrags municipality and Roja municipality. The administrative centre of the municipality is Talsi city. The population in 2022 was 35,194.

On 25 January 2023, a traffic sign was erected with the municipality's Livonian name to reflect its Livonian cultural heritage as part of the Livonian language revival process. The sign is notable for being the first Livonian-language traffic sign in Latvia; similar signs are planned to be placed at villages along the Livonian Coast.

== Population ==
| Territorial unit | Population (year) |
|---|---|
| Abava parish | 1123 (2018) |
| Ārlava parish | 887 (2018) |
| Balgale parish | 839 (2018) |
| Ģibuļi parish | 2286 (2018) |
| Īve parish | 450 (2018) |
| Ķūļciems parish | 358 (2018) |
| Laidze parish | 1801 (2018) |
| Lauciene parish | 1574 (2018) |
| Lībagi parish | 1967 (2018) |
| Lube parish | 482 (2018) |
| Sabile | 1542 (2018) |
| Stende | 1741 (2018) |
| Strazde parish | 388 (2018) |
| Talsi | 10029 (2018) |
| Valdemārpils | 1332 (2018) |
| Valdgale parish | 1251 (2018) |
| Vandzene parish | 1657 (2018) |
| Virbi parish | 823 (2018) |

== Twin towns — sister cities ==
Talsi is twinned with:

- Alanya, Turkey
- Lejre, Denmark
- Orhei, Moldova
- Prienai, Lithuania
- Saaremaa, Estonia
- Shchyolkovo, Russia
- Söderköping, Sweden
- (Georgia (country)) Telavi, Georgia

== Symbols ==
After the 2021 administrative reform, the previous coat of arms and flag of the municipality were abolished and work began on creating new ones. The new coat of arms was adopted on 20 October 2022, with the new flag following on 29 June 2023.

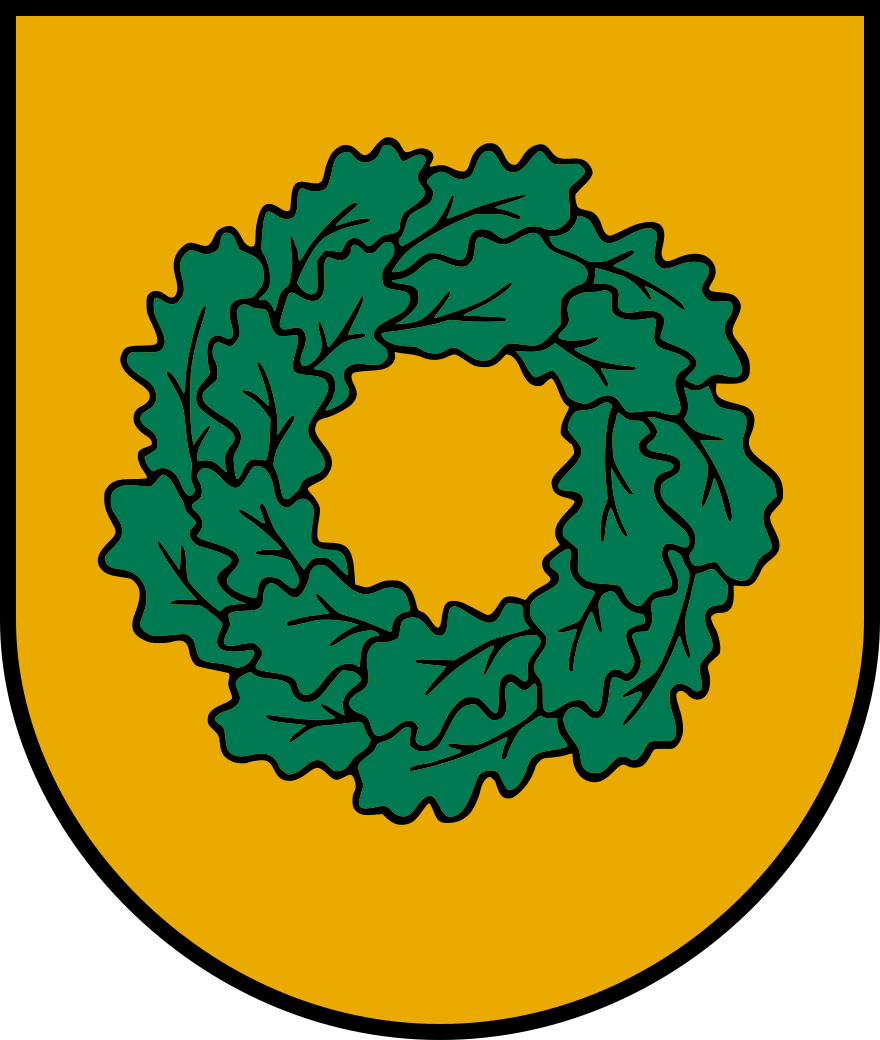
Coat of arms (2010–2021)

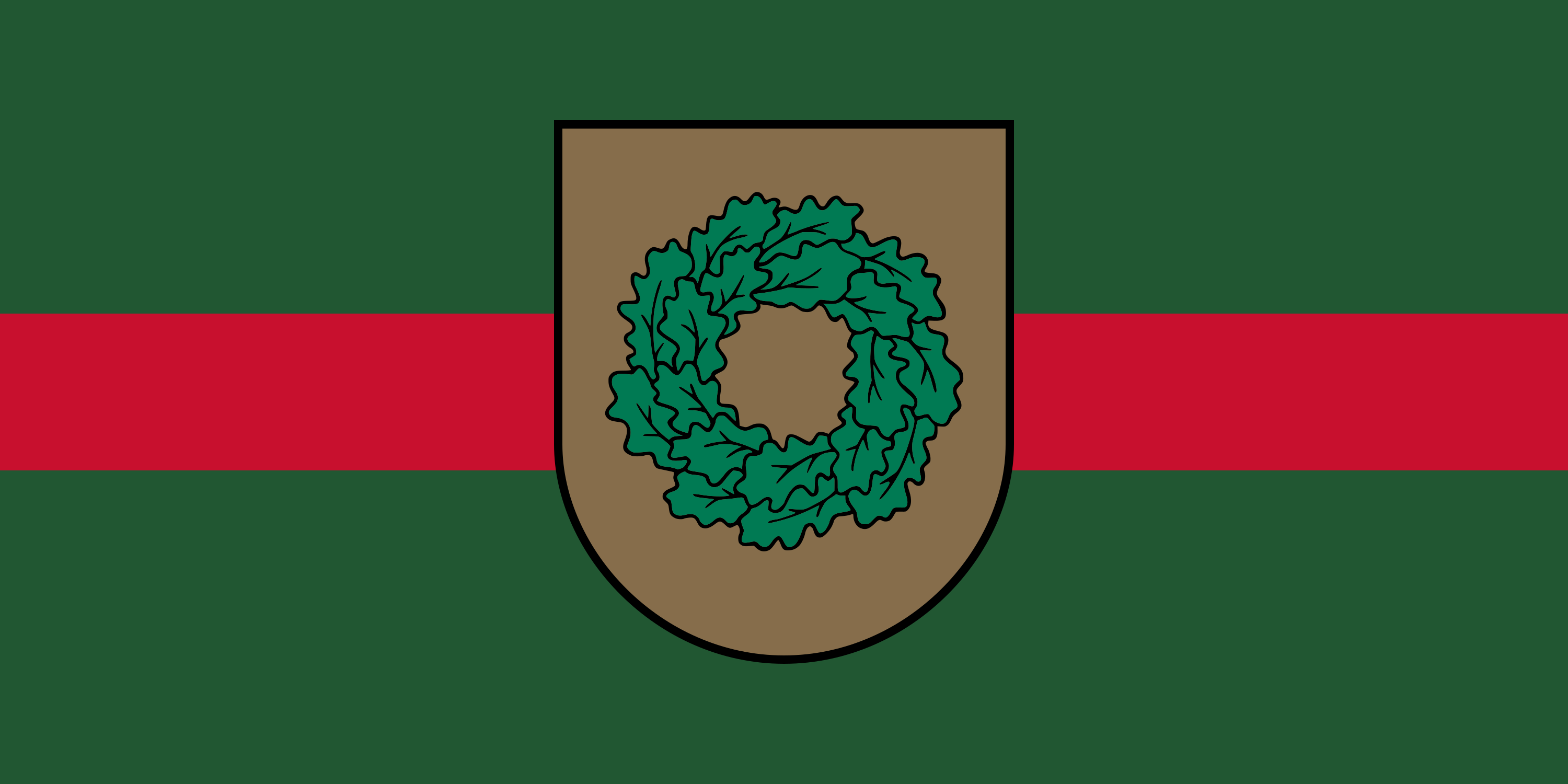
Flag (2010–2021)

== Notable people ==
- Krišjānis Valdemārs (1825 in Valdgale parish – 1891), a writer, educator, politician, lexicographer, folklorist and economist
- Oswald Schmiedeberg (1838 – 1921), a Baltic German pharmacologist, worked at the University of Strasbourg
- Teodors Grīnbergs (1870 in Valdgale Parish - 1962), the first archbishop of the Evangelical Lutheran Church of Latvia from 1932
- Kōrli Stalte (1870 in Mazirbe – 1947), a prolific Livonian cultural activist, married a Baltic German
- Alberts Šeibelis (1906 in Sabile – 1972), footballer, he played 54 matches for Latvia and scored 14 goals
- Hilda Grīva (1910 in Sīkrags – 1984), music teacher, choir conductor, founder and director of the folklore ensemble "Kāndla"
- Edgar Vaalgamaa (1912 in Košrags – 2003), a Livonian pastor and ethnologist.
- Līga Purmale (born 1948 in Dundaga), a painter using the technique of photorealism
- Ainars Zvirgzdiņš (born 1959 in Sabile), basketball coach, mostly known with the women's national team
- Nauris Puntulis (born 1961 in Tinģere), a singer and politician, Minister of culture, 2019 to 2023

== See also ==
- Administrative divisions of Latvia (2009)
