= Stone ship =

Stones set in the shape of a boat in north European burials

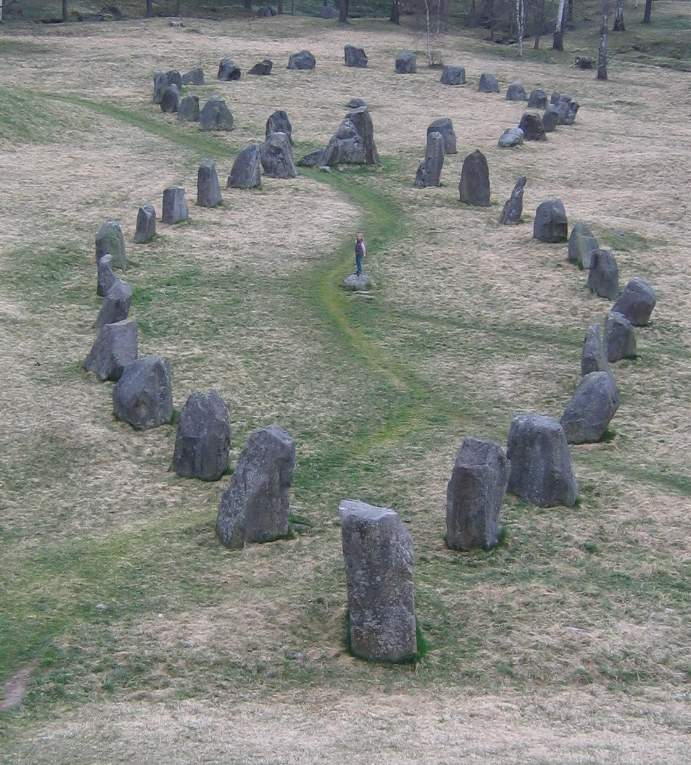
The two greatest stone ships at Anund's barrow in Sweden.

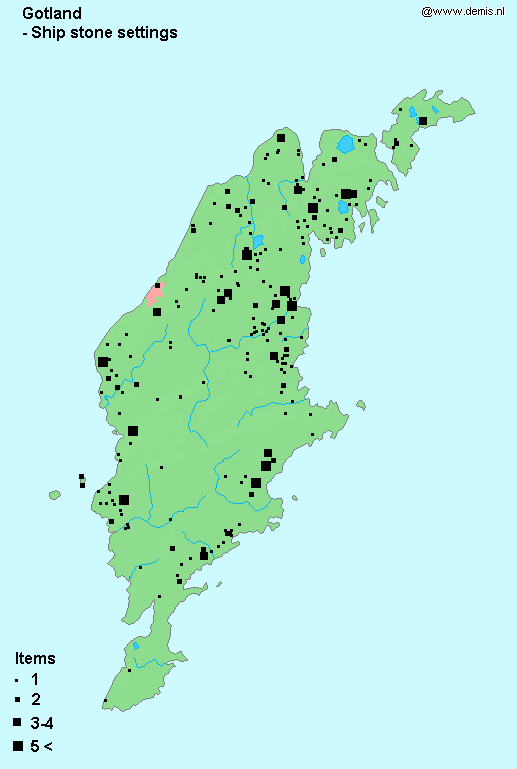
Stone ships on Gotland, Sweden

The stone ship, or ship setting, was an early burial custom in Scandinavia, Northern Germany, and the Baltic states. The grave or cremation burial was surrounded by slabs or stones in the shape of a boat or ship. The ships vary in size and were erected from c. 1000 BCE to 1000 CE.

== History ==
Stone ships were an early burial custom, characteristically Scandinavian but also found in Northern Germany and the Baltic states. The grave or cremation burial was surrounded by tightly or loosely fit slabs or stones in the outline of a ship. They are often found in grave fields, but are sometimes far from any other archaeological remains.

Ship settings are of varying sizes, some of monumental proportions. The largest known is the mostly destroyed Jelling stone ship in Denmark, which was at least 170 m (560 ft) long. In Sweden, the size varies from 67 m (220 ft) (Ale's Stones) to only a few metres. The orientation also varies. Inside, they can be cobbled or filled with stones, or have raised stones in the positions of masts. The illusion of being ships has often been reinforced by larger stones at the ends. Some have an oblique stern.

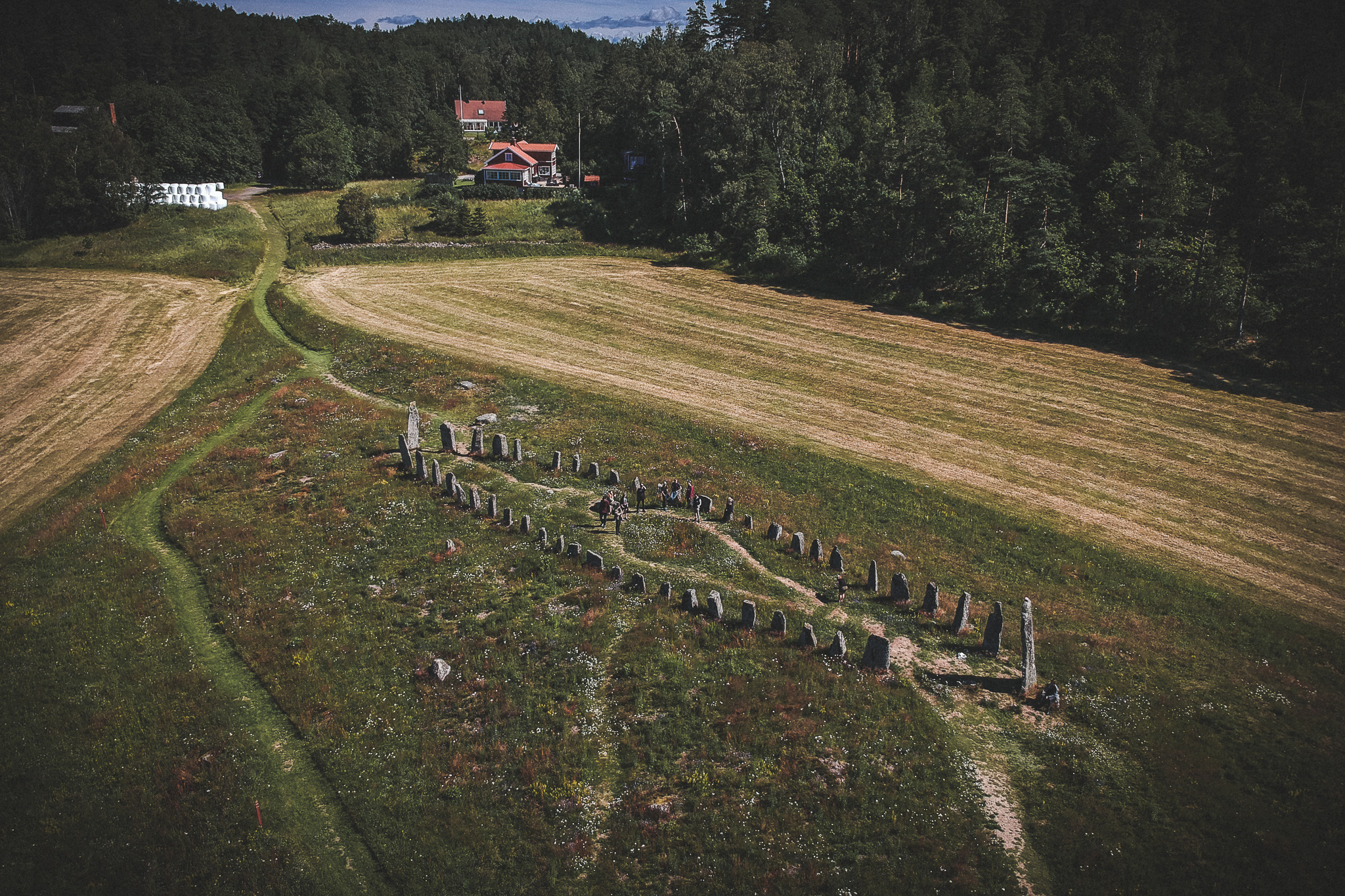
Blomsholm, Sweden

Scattered examples are found in Northern Germany and along the coast of the Baltic States. Excavations have shown that they are usually from the latter part of the Nordic Bronze Age, c. 1000 BCE – 500 BCE (e.g. Gotland) or from the Germanic Iron Age, the Vendel Period and the Viking Age (e.g. Blekinge and Scania).

Scholars have suggested both that the stone ship developed out of the desire to equip the dead with everything they had in life, and alternatively that it was specifically associated with the journey to Hel. One puzzling feature is that they sometimes occur at the base of a barrow, enclosing a flat area presumably intended for public ceremonies.

In a paper published in 2012, Joseph S. Hopkins and Haukur Þorgeirsson propose a connection between stone ships and the image of a 'ship in a field' that the goddess Freyja's afterlife locations Fólkvangr and Sessrúmnir produce when considered together. According to Hopkins and Haukur, "'A ship in the field' in the mythical realm may have been conceived as a reflection of actual burial customs and vice versa. It is possible that the symbolic ship was thought of as providing some sort of beneficial property to the land, such as good seasons and peace brought on by Freyr’s mound burial in Ynglinga saga."

== Notable stone ships ==
=== Denmark ===
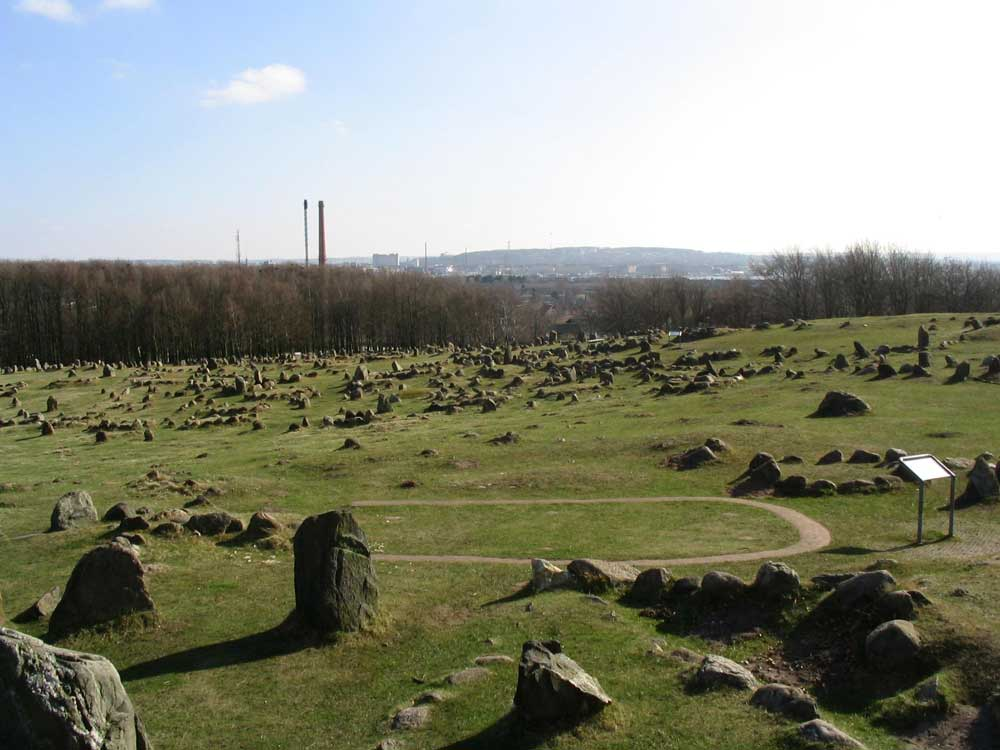
Lindholm Høje

- Bække, Denmark. 800 m north of Bække there is a 45 m (148 ft) ship which dates to the Viking Age.
- Jelling stone ship. Under the southern mound in Jelling, Denmark, which is associated with Queen Thyra, remains of a giant Viking Age stone ship have been found, by far the largest known: either 170 or 354 m (558 or 1,161 ft).
- Kerteminde fjord, Denmark, a 20 m (66 ft) ship which dates to the Viking Age.
- Lejre, Denmark. An approximately 80 m (260 ft) ship of 28 stones. The ship was cleared in 1921 by a landowner, but some local people interested in history succeeded in saving the stones. Viking Age.
- Lindholm Høje near Aalborg, Denmark. The highest concentration of well-preserved stone ships.
- Glavendrup stone contains the longest rune text in Denmark and is a part of a stone ship located in Glavendruplunden in Northern Funen. The stone ship was built around a Bronze Age tumulus.

=== Germany ===
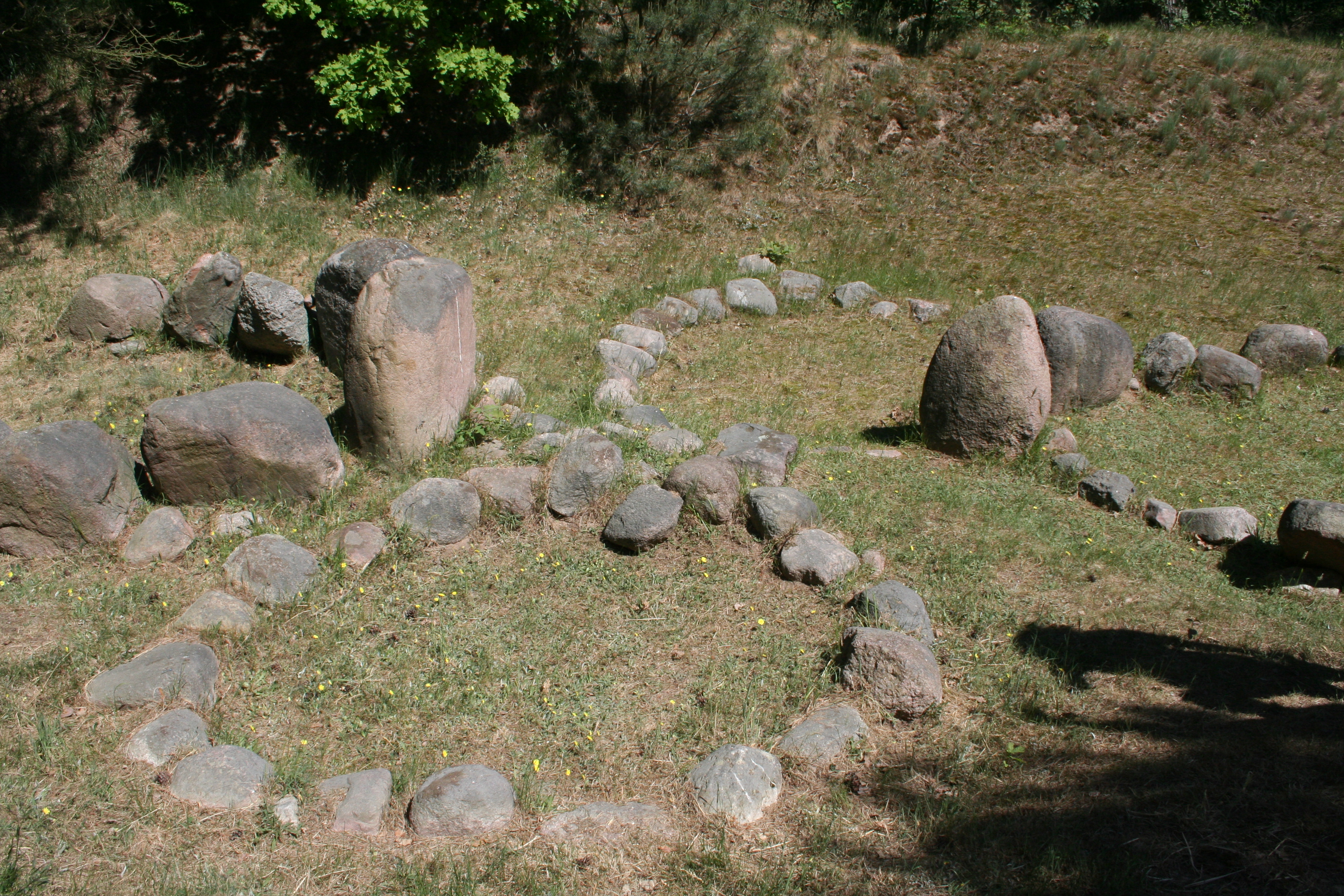
Altes Lager (Menzlin)

- Altes Lager (Menzlin) near Anklam, Western Pomerania, Germany. The stone ships date back to the 9th century.

=== Norway ===
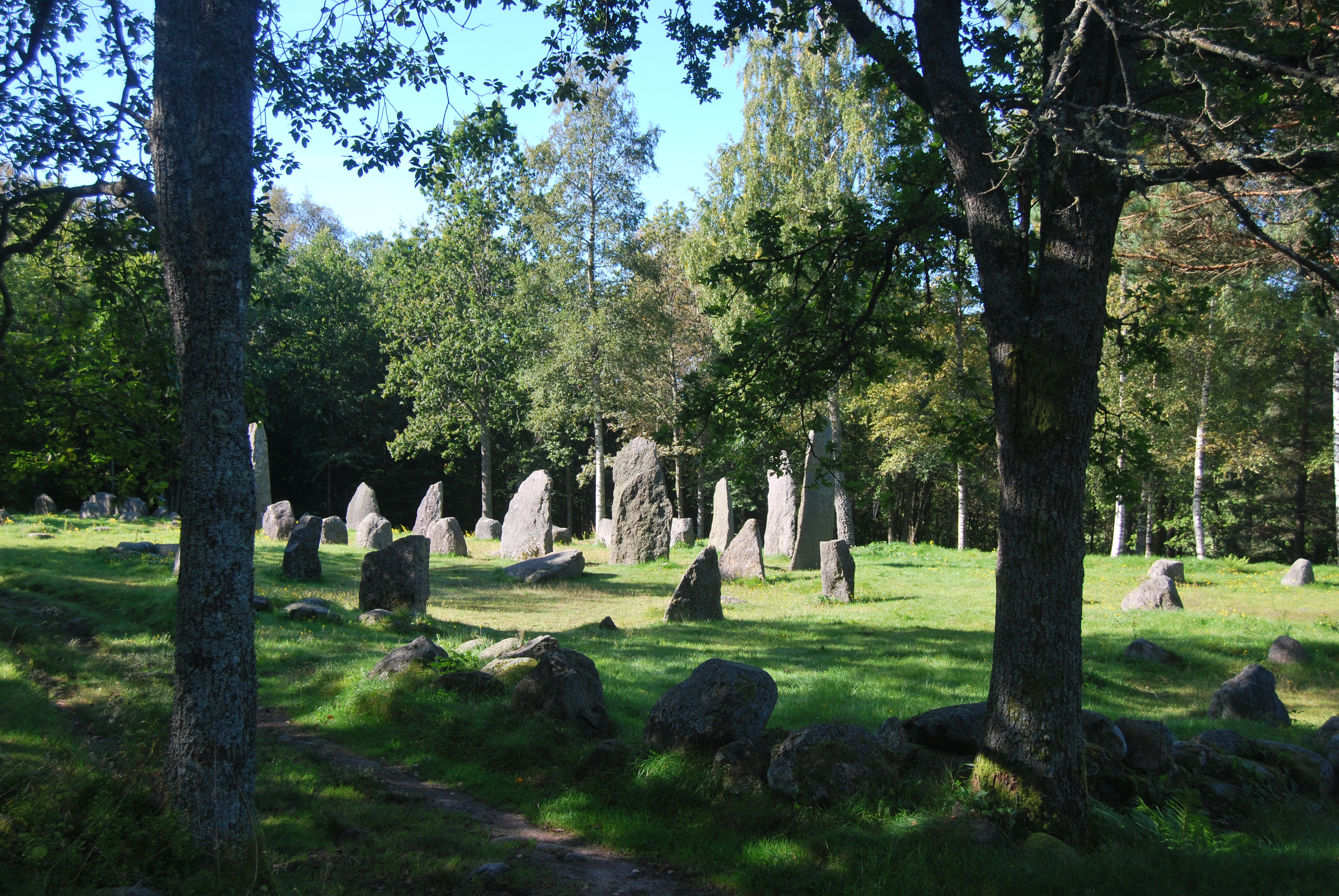
Istrehågan

- Istrehågan near Sandefjord and Larvik, Vestfold, Norway. Dated to between the 5th to 7th centuries.

=== Sweden ===
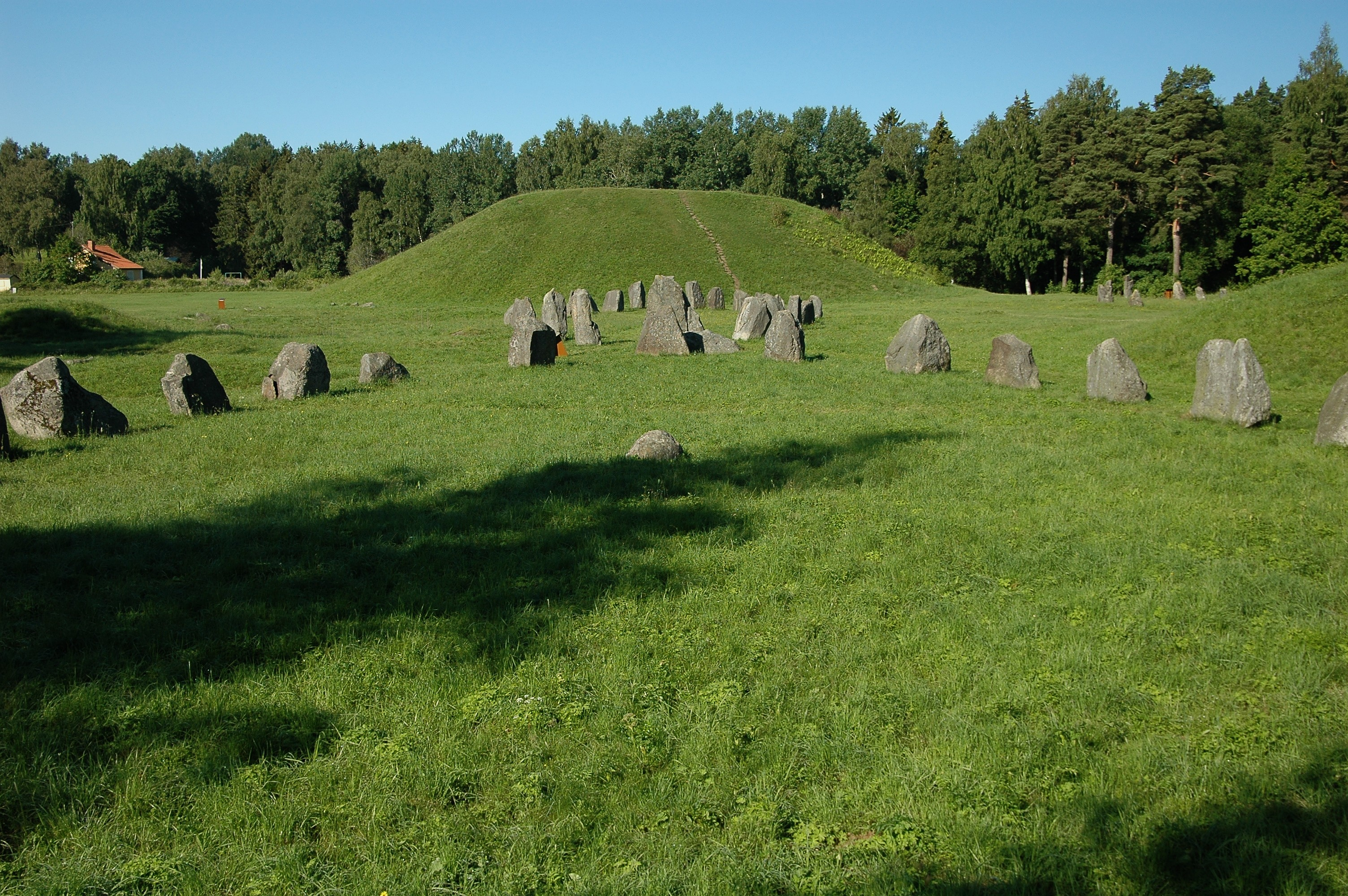
Anundshög

- Ale's Stones is a stone ship in southernmost Sweden. It is 67 m (220 ft) long and 19 m (62 ft) wide.
- Anundshög double stone ship at Anundshög (from the Old Norse haugr, mound) has a total length of 100 m (330 ft) and one of the ships is 25 m (82 ft) wide. In the same area there are several smaller stone ships.
- Askeberga stone ships is Sweden's second largest stone ship, measuring 55 m (180 ft) in length. It is, however, the most remarkable one as it is made of 24 enormous boulders, weighing about 25 tonnes each.
- Blomsholm stone ships. The stone ship at Blomsholm near Strömstad in Bohuslän measures more than 40 m (130 ft) in length and consists of 49 large menhirs. The bow and stern are about 4 m (13 ft) high. There are several other large megaliths in the area.
- Gettlinge grave field, Öland, Sweden.
- Hulterstad grave field, Öland, Sweden includes a total of 170 burial locations.
- Tjelvar's Grave (image) in Boge, according to legend the grave of Gotland's mythical discoverer Thjelvar, dated c. 750 BCE.
- Lake Mjösjön stone ship, ship setting with edge chain, 10 km south east of Umeå, Sweden's most northerly stone ship, found immediately south of Lake Mjösjön near Yttertavle, on a former island (now mainland) next to four graves from the Bronze Age.

=== Estonia ===
- Lülle double stone ship on Saaremaa island with lengths of 7.5 m (25 ft) and 6 m (20 ft) and a width of 2 m (6.6 ft), dating from around 900 BCE.
- Väo stone ship, which had been covered by later stone cist graves.

=== Latvia ===
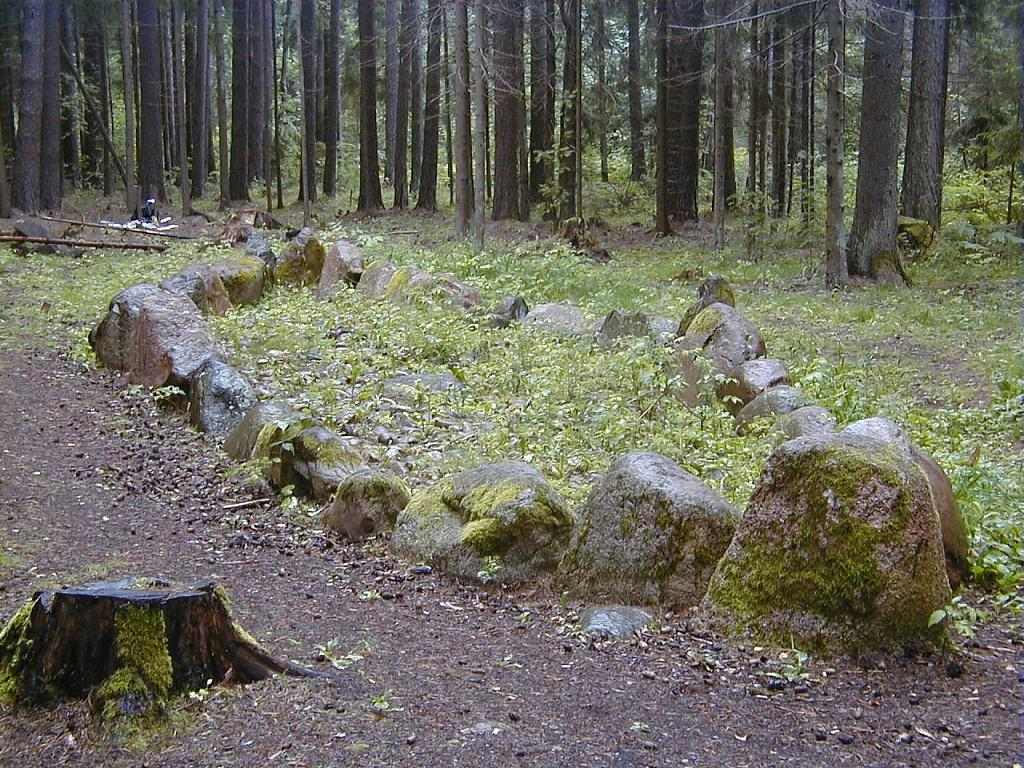
Bīlavu Velna laiva in Courland.

- "Velna laivas" (Devils' ships) mainly in Talsi Municipality (northern Courland), dated c. 950–750 BCE.
- Bīlavu Velna laiva (Lube Parish, Talsi Municipality) – Located in the Vidzera forest, consisting of two end-to-end stone ships (each ~15 m / 49 ft long). Excavated in 1863 by Julius Döring and restored in 1999, it is one of only two sites preserved and visible in nature today.
- Birznieku Velna laiva (Ārlava Parish, Talsi Municipality) – A 14.5 m (48 ft) long stone ship featuring a 5.1 m (17 ft) "rudder" section at its southern end. It is the second site that remains visible today.
- Destroyed sites:
  - Mušiņu Velna laiva (Lube Parish, Talsi Municipality) – A site containing two connected stone ships aligned northwest to southeast. This site was covered by a pile of field stones in the 1970s.
  - Lībes Velna laiva (Lube Parish, Talsi Municipality). This site was completely destroyed in the 1970s during land reclamation.
  - Paušu Velna laiva (Vandzene Parish, Talsi Municipality).
  - Poju Velna laiva (Vandzene Parish, Talsi Municipality).
  - Plintiņu Velna laiva (Valdgale Parish, Talsi Municipality). This site was completely destroyed in the 1970s during land reclamation.

== See also ==
- Stone circle (Iron Age)
- Menhir
- Ship burial
- Solar barge
