= Jelling stone ship =

Buried stone ship in Jelling, Denmark

Coordinates: 55°45′21.82″N 9°25′9.99″E

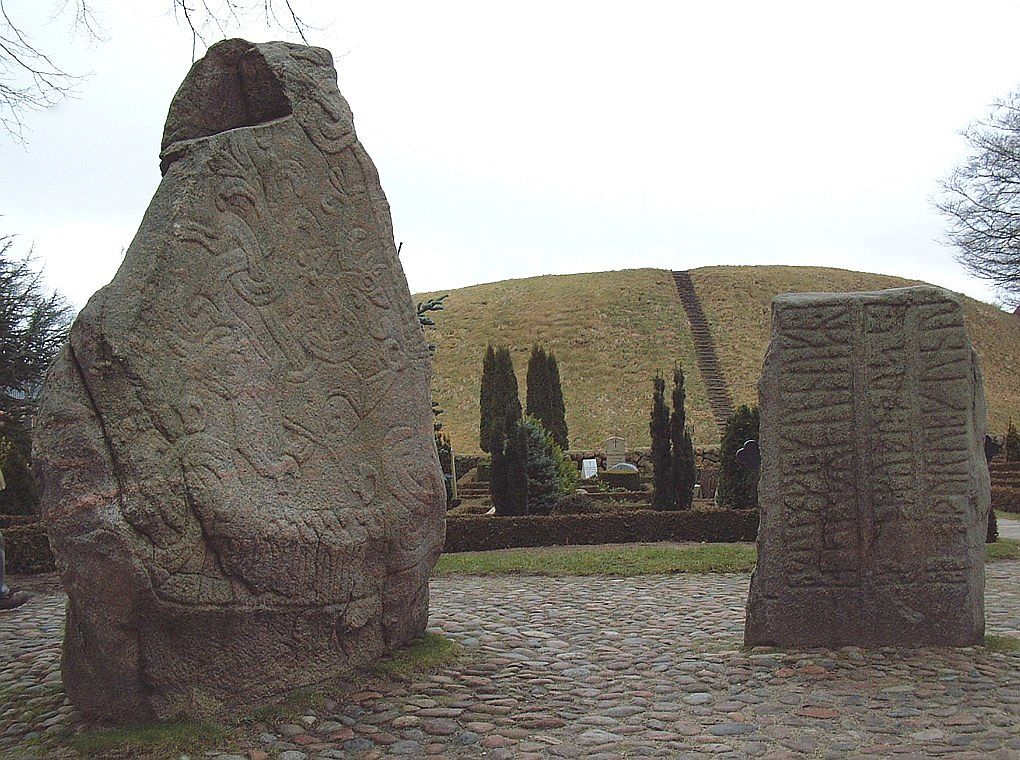
South mound at Jelling, under which remains of one end of the stone ship were found; in the foreground, the Jelling stones

The Jelling stone ship is a stone ship, the longest known to have existed, remains of which lie under the two royal barrows at Jelling, Denmark.

The Jelling ship was formerly thought to have extended between the two mounds and been 170 metres (560 ft) long, by far the longest stone ship discovered. However, recent archaeological research and the re-evaluation of large pits on the west side of the north mound which were noted in the 1960s has led to a different reconstruction, in which the ship had the north mound as its centre rather than its stern and was 354 metres (1,161 ft) long; this length corresponds to 1,200 Roman feet, and the Trelleborg fortresses were also measured out in Roman feet.

King Harald Bluetooth erected a great mound, the largest burial mound in Denmark, over an existing Bronze Age burial mound at Jelling, and buried in it the remains of his father Gorm the Old. Later, to the south of it he raised an even higher empty mound, which a runestone raised by Gorm describes as the grave of Harald's mother, Queen Thyra. One end of the stone ship is preserved under this southern mound. Between the two mounds, Harald placed a larger runestone in memory of both his parents, and the smaller stone now stands beside it. The two stones are now in the churchyard on the south side of Jelling church, the fourth church to occupy the site south of the north mound. Still during the 10th century, Gorm's body was moved from the north mound, which now contains only the grave goods, to a grave under the church.

The triangle of stones under the south mound was previously thought to have enclosed a temple and the runestone to Thyra, but when the base of the south mound was opened in 1992 in connection with work on a road, the lines were found to be slightly curved, and traces of the other end of the ship were then found under the north mound also. Dendrochronological evidence dates the building up of the north mound and the creation of the new burial chamber within it to 958–59 CE, coinciding with Gorm's death that winter, and the creation of the south mound to approximately 970. The lichen on the ship stones which were covered by the south mound suggests that by then they had stood in the open for some 20 to 30 years. However, if the ship setting was centred on the north mound, then it post-dates it.

The runestone to Thyra, whose original position is unknown, may have been associated with the ship, perhaps forming its prow, in which case it would have been part of Gorm's monument to his queen. There is also a stone ship associated with a Bronze Age burial mound at Bække, where a runestone was raised by Tue, son of Ravn, to his trutnik Thyra, claiming that Tue raised Thyra's mound. A recent suggestion is that Thyra was married first to Gorm and then to Tue and that the mounds and ships represent rival claims to her lands on the part of Tue and Harald. This would explain the raising of an empty mound and the prominent runestone between the two Jelling mounds, in which Harald refers to both his parents.

== See also ==
- Jelling stones

== Sources ==
- Knud J. Krogh. "The Royal Viking-Age Monuments at Jelling in the Light of Recent Archaeological Excavations". Acta Archaeologica 53 (1982) 86–216: the initial identification of the remains as a ship.
- P. Mohr Christensen and S. Wulff Andersen. "Kongeligt?" Skalk 2008 pp. 3–10: reinterpretation as centred on the north mound. (pdf, Danish)
