= Lake Mjösjön stone ship =

Ancient monument in Sweden

- 63°45′23″N 20°22′2″E
- Location: Umeå, Sweden
- Type: Monument
- Length: 16 m
- Width: 4 m

The Lake Mjösjön stone ship measures 16 x 4 m and is from the late Bronze Age. It is located immediately south east of Lake Mjösjön on a small hill about 35 metres above today's sea level. Due to the land uplift, three thousand years ago, the top of the hill would have been a small island with an area of about 200 x 100 m, with the stone ship located close to its northern tip.

The Lake Mjösjön stone ship ranks as the most important in Northern Sweden and demonstrates several similarities with stone ships at the Swedish island Gotland. The same site is also the location for two smaller cairns.

Stone ships or ship settings were an early type of graves, characteristically found in Scandinavia, but also in the Baltic states and Northern Germany.
