= Ale's Stones =

Stone ship in Ystad, Sweden

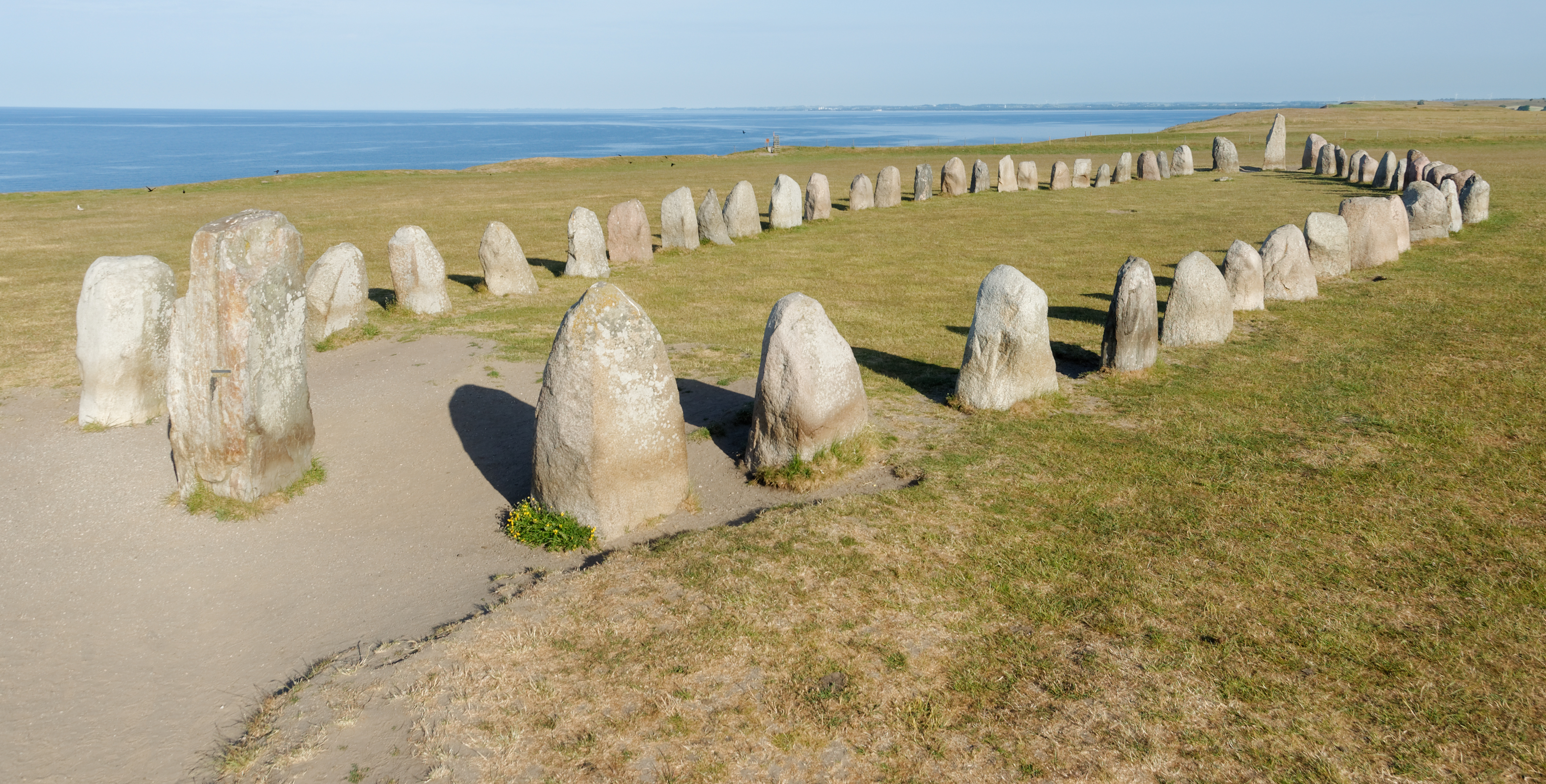
- Ale's Stones at Kåseberga, around ten kilometres southeast of Ystad.
- Interactive map of Ale's Stones
- 55.382665°N 14.0543879°E
- Type: Monument
- Cultures: Norse
- Location: Scania, Sweden
- Region: Österlen

History
- Built: Nordic Iron Age
- Abandoned: c. 1200

Site notes
- Archaeologists: Björn Wallebom; Bengt Söderberg

Ale's Stones (Swedish: Ales stenar or Ale stenar) is a megalithic monument in Scania in southern Sweden. It is a stone ship, oval in outline, with the stones at each end markedly larger than the rest. It is 67 m (220 ft) long formed by 59 large boulders, weighing up to 5 tonnes each.

The carbon-14 dating system for organic remains has provided seven results at the site. One indicates that the material is around 5,500 years old, whereas the remaining six indicate a date about 1,400 years ago. The latter is considered to be the most likely time for Ales Stenar to have been created. That would place its creation towards the end of the Nordic Iron Age.

== Function ==
The function and purpose of Ale's stones is much disputed, and there are many different theories. It is generally believed to be a grave monument or a cult center, but another theory is that it is a sun calendar.

A theory explained by Howard Crowhurst (ACEM, Association for the Knowledge and Study of Megaliths, in France) claims that the monument is connected with the summer solstice and lunar standstill.

"The Ales Stenar, known in English as the Ale's Stones, is an ancient megalithic monument of Sweden. The stones are outlining a ship. Here we show the well-known alignment of this ship along the sunset direction on summer solstice. We propose also alignments of the stones along the northern possible moonset on major and minor lunar standstills. These astronomical alignments are shown using the Photographer's Ephemeris. It is possible that this megalithic monument was used for observing the cycles of the moon."

== Excavations ==
In 1989, during the first archaeological excavations performed in order to scientifically investigate and date the monument, archaeologists found a decorated clay pot with burned human bones inside the ship setting. The bones are thought to come from a pyre and to have been placed in the pot at a later date. The pot's contents varied in age; some material was from 330 to 540 CE while a piece of charred food crust also found inside was determined to be from 540 to 650 CE. The archaeologists working on the project also found birch charcoal remains from 540 to 650 CE underneath an undisturbed boulder. According to the Swedish National Heritage Board, carbon-14 dating of the organic material from the site indicates that six of the samples are from around 600 CE, while one sample is from ca. 3500 BCE. The diverging sample came from soot-covered stones that are believed to be the remnants of an older hearth, found close to the ship setting. On the basis of these results, the Swedish National Heritage Board has set a suggested date of creation for Ale's Stones to 1,400 BP, which is the year 550 CE.

== Gallery ==
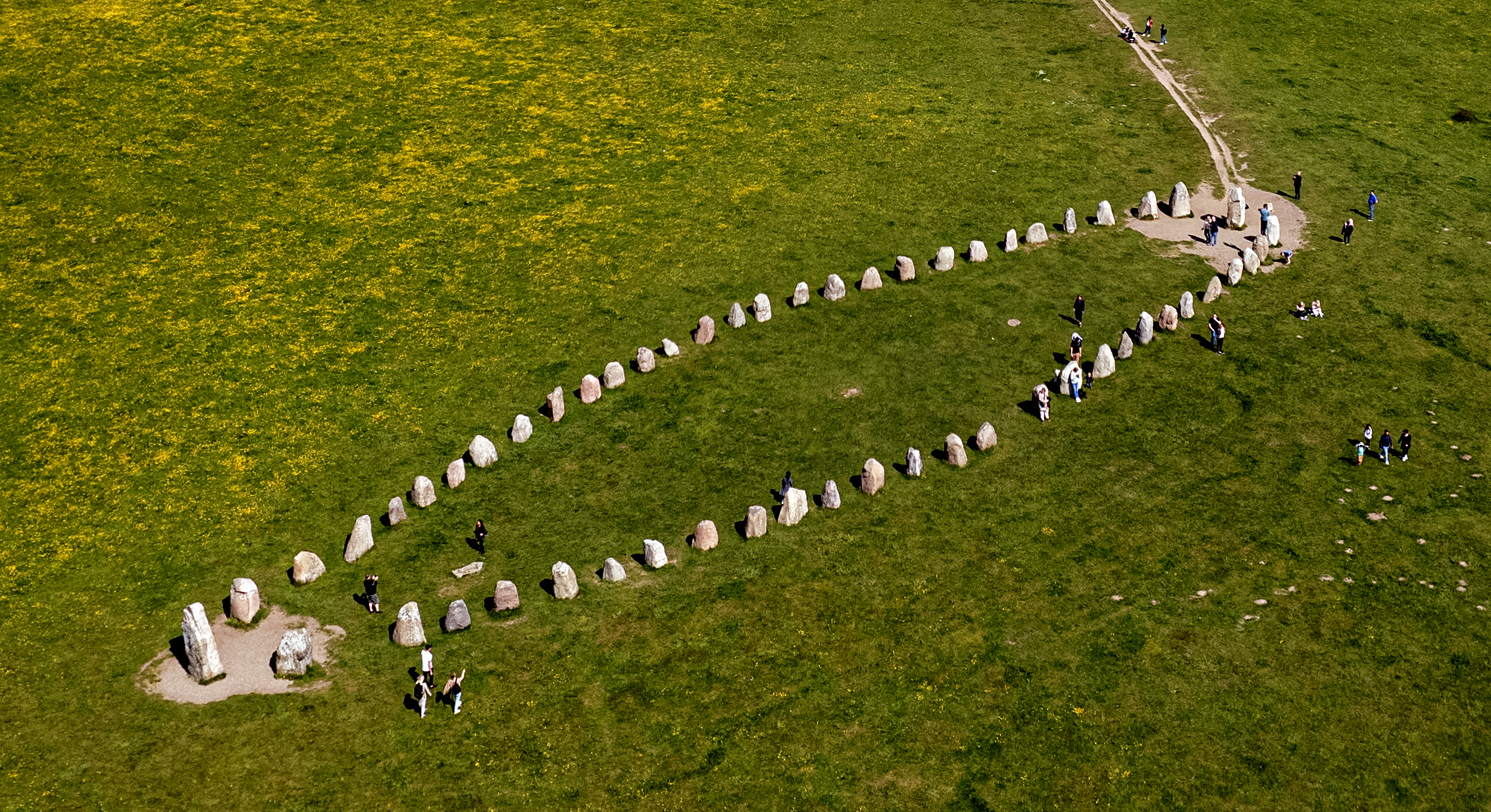
Aerial view 2021.

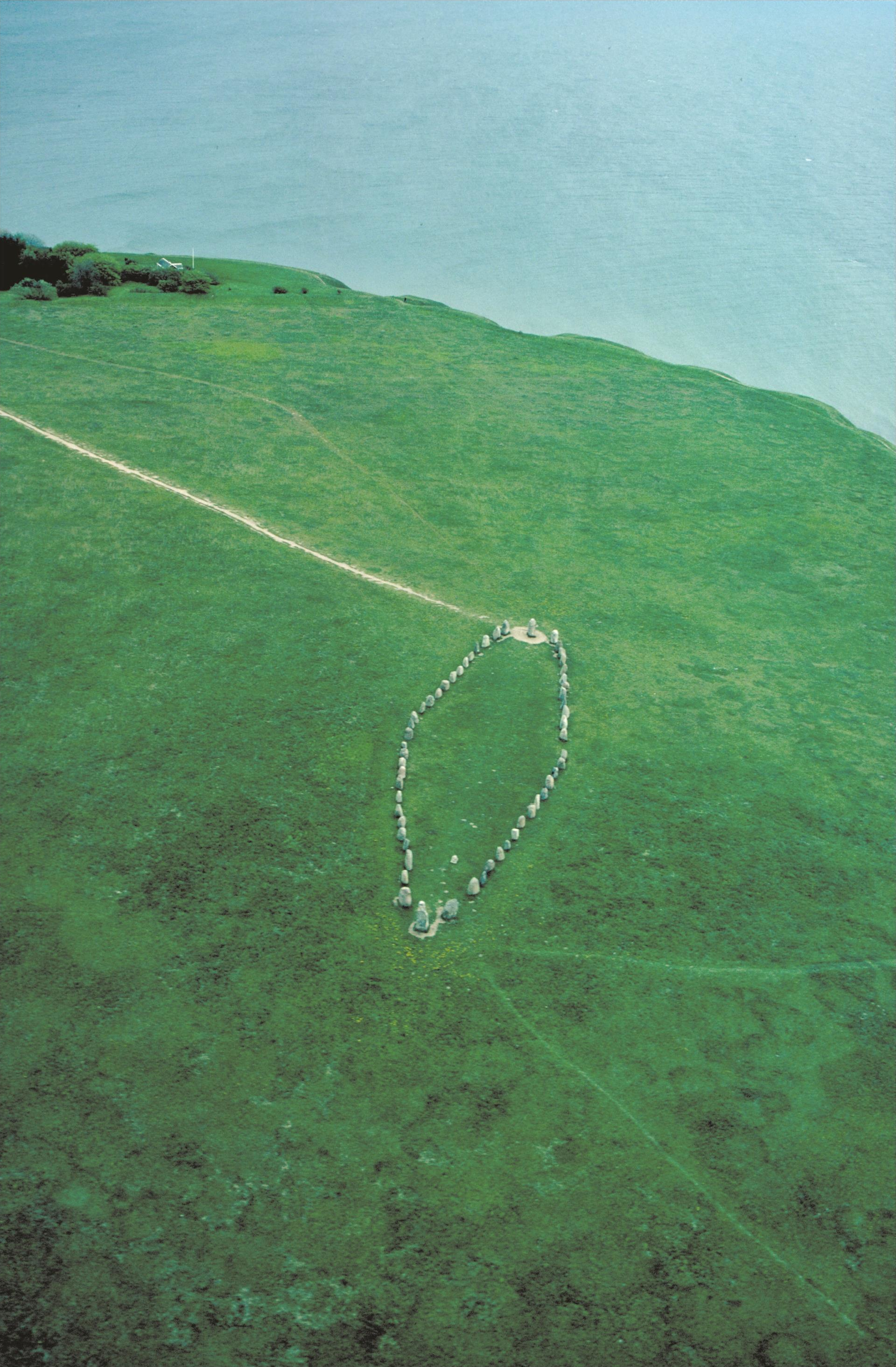
Aerial view.

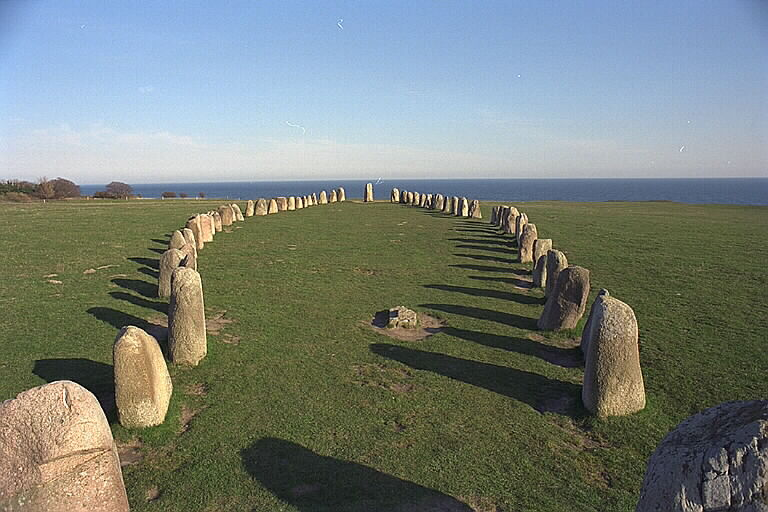
Longitudinal view.

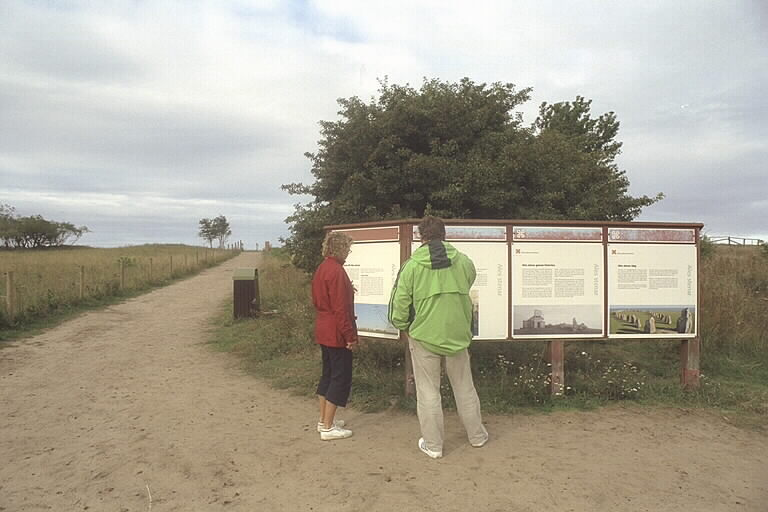
Information panels on site.

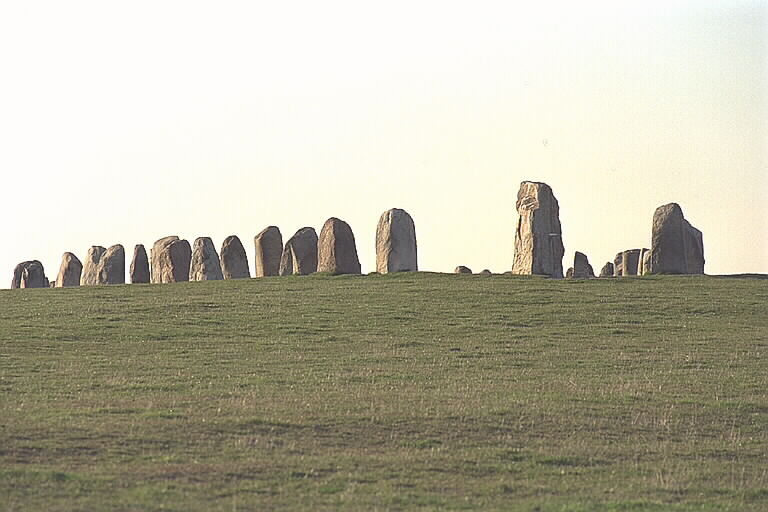
Side view of Ale's Stones.

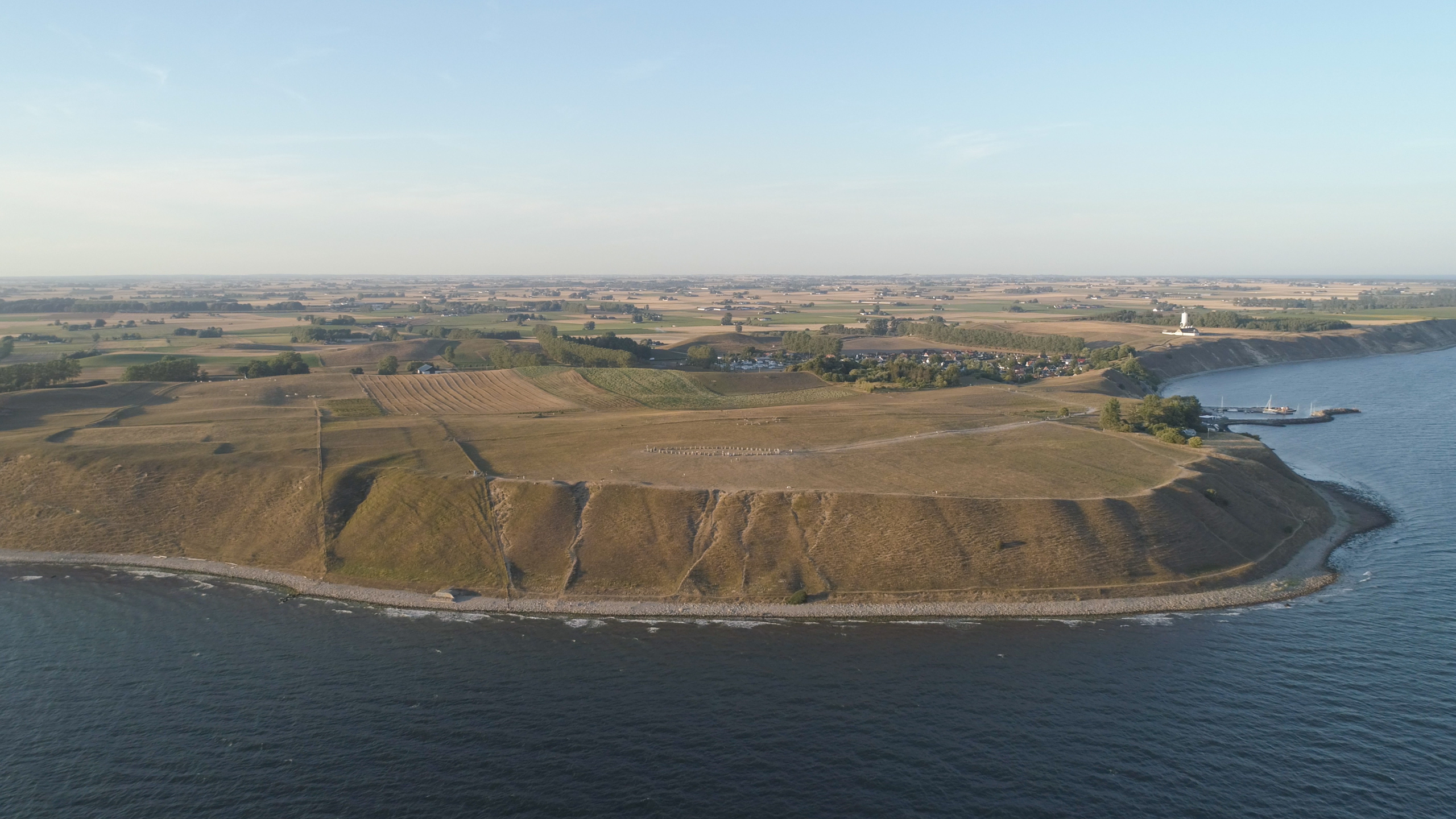
Aerial view from the sea.

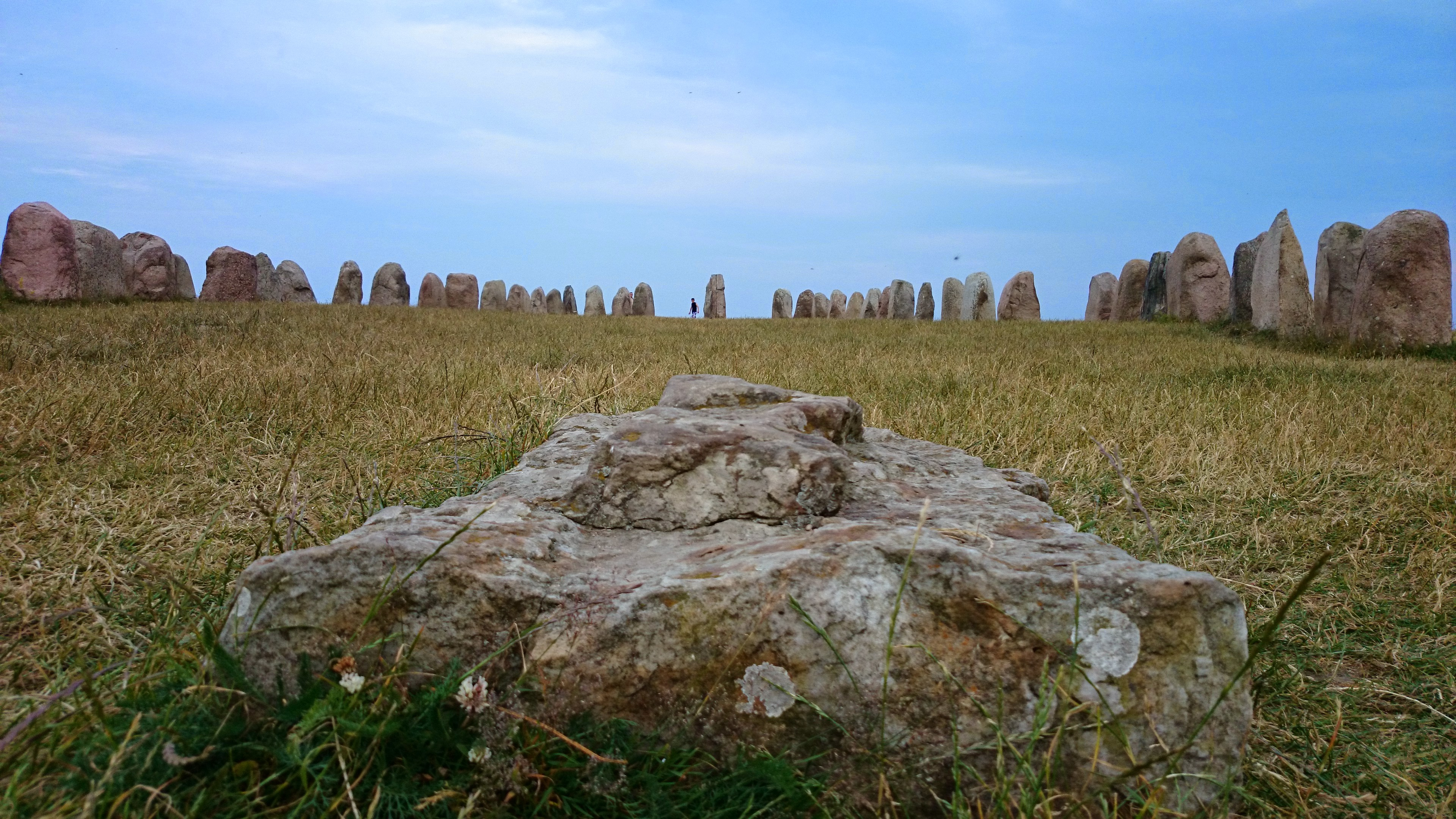
View from inside the area
