= Thyra =

Viking Age Danish queen

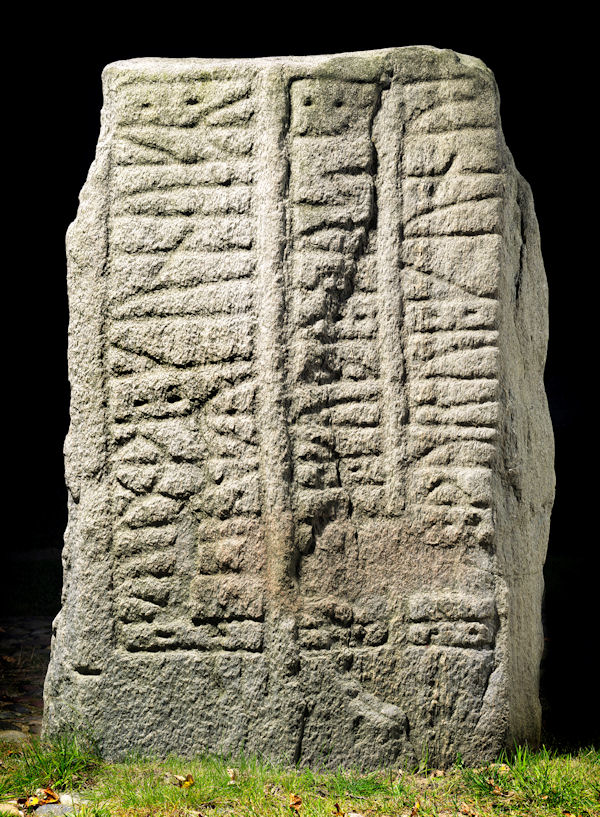
- The Jelling 1 stone, commissioned by Thyra's husband Gorm the Old to commemorate her.

Queen consort of Denmark
- Died: Likely before 963 CE. See § Death and burial
- Spouse: Gorm the Old
- Issue: Harald Bluetooth; Canute; Gunnhild, Mother of Kings
- House: House of Gorm
- Father: Unclear. See § Origin and early life

Thyra or Thyri (Old Norse: Þyri or Þyre) was the wife of King Gorm the Old of Denmark, and one of the first queens of Denmark believed by scholars to be historical rather than legendary. She is presented in medieval sources as a wise and powerful woman who ordered the building or fortification of the Danevirke, consistent with her commemoration on multiple Viking Age runestones. These include those at Jelling which was the seat of power for her dynasty.

Although her existence is documented in Viking Age runic inscriptions, very little is known about Thyra with certainty as no other contemporary sources about her survive. Much of her story is pieced together through 12th and 13th century sources that broadly disagree with one another, such as Icelandic sagas and writings of the medieval historians Saxo Grammaticus and Sven Aggesen. When she was born and became queen is unclear, however, she likely ruled until her death in the middle of the 10th century. Historians widely agree that she and Gorm were the parents of Harald Bluetooth and likely also Canute. The Historia Norwegiæ additionally claims that they had a daughter, Gunnhild, Mother of Kings, though this is less certain.

== Name ==
Thyra's name is attested in Old Norse as Þyri and Þyre and has been alternatively anglicised as Thorvi and Thyre.

The Jelling 1 stone, commissioned in honour of Thyra by her husband after her death refers to her as Danmarkar bót, translating as "Denmark's adornment", "strength", "salvation" or "remedy". It has been further argued that the words Danmarkar bót instead refer to Gorm, with Thyra's importance being a later innovation by medieval writers, though this is not the scholarly consensus. This term is also used to describe her in Saga Hálfdanar svarta as Danmarkar bótar (sometimes anglicised as "Dannebod").

== Origin and early life ==
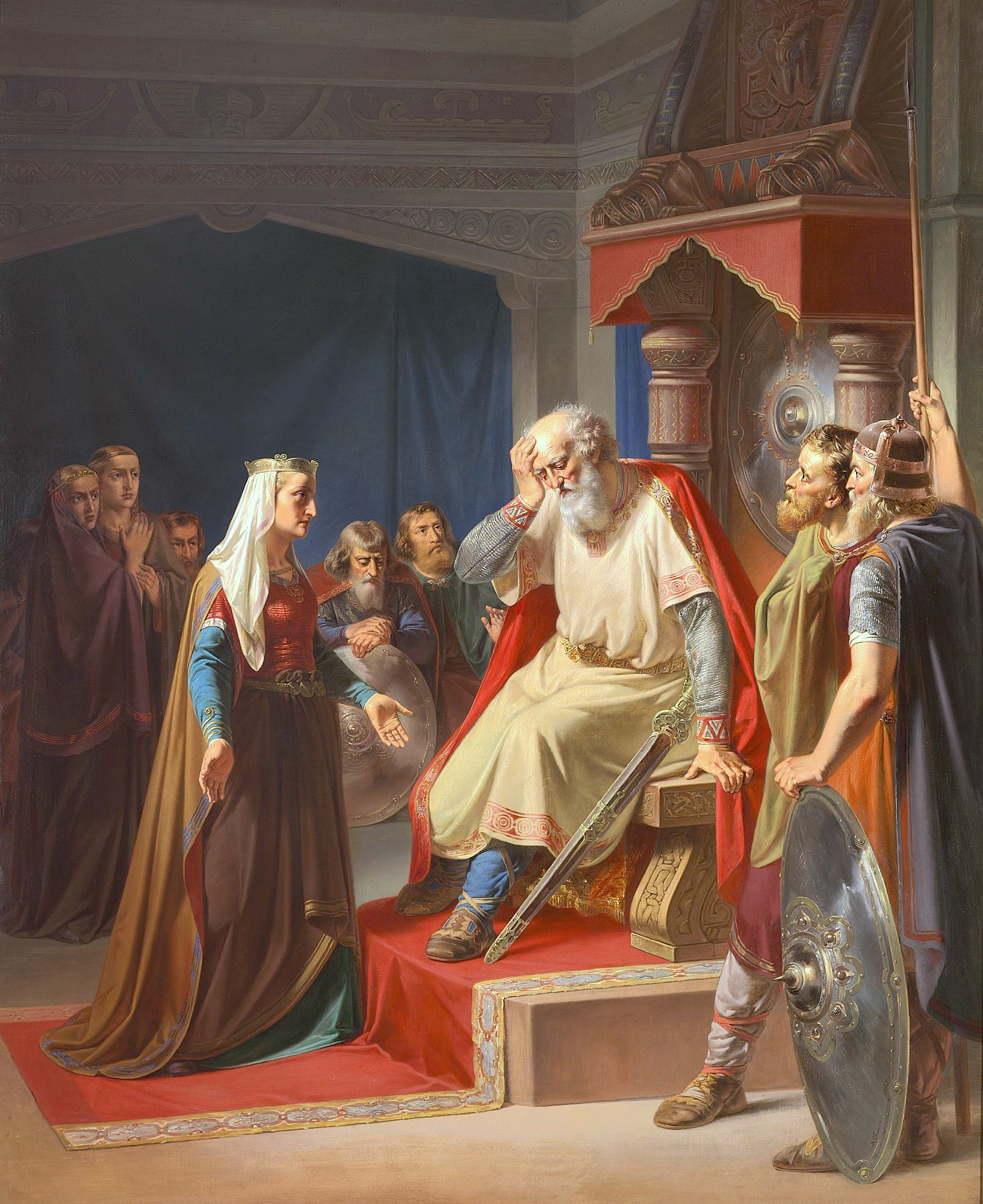
Thyra telling Gorm of the death of their son Canute, painting by August Carl Vilhelm Thomsen

Thyra's parentage is unclear, with accounts produced by medieval historians and in Icelandic sagas during the 12th and 13th centuries being dubious and contradictory. They variously describe her as the daughter of an English king and a king in Jutland.

In the twelfth-century Gesta Danorum, Saxo Grammaticus describes her as the daughter of King Æthelred the Unready. His grandson Harold Bluetooth plundered England, and Æthelred so admired Harold's manliness that he disinherited his own son in Harold's favour. Æthelred's son and grandson made Harold's descendants their heirs. A consequence of this stressed by Saxo is that Cnut's claim to the English king was both by a claim repeatedly recognised and by battle. Saxo implies that Danish kings in his own time had a valid claim to the English throne.

According to Sven Aggesen, Thyra was of German origin and her marriage to Gorm had been arranged by the German emperor to whom Gorm owed a large tribute. Having installed Thyra as Gorm's wife, she was to collect the tribute for the emperor. Aggesen claims that Thyra refused to pay the emperor, heroically declaring that the Danes were no longer a tributary to the Kingdom of Germany.

== Queen of Denmark ==
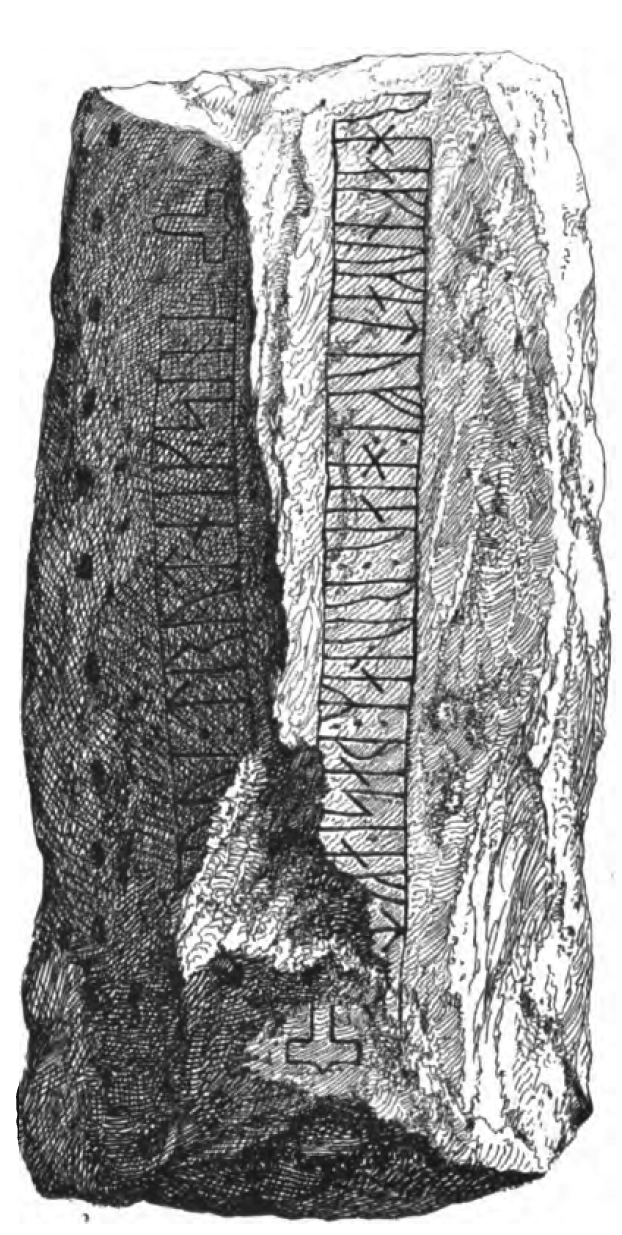
The Læborg stone, likely commemorating Queen Thyra, and depicting two Thor's hammers

=== Marriage and children with Gorm the Old ===
Little is known concretely about Thyra's role as queen consort of Denmark, nor the circumstances of her marriage to Gorm and their children. Gorm became king around 936 CE, however it is unknown if he was already married to Thyra, and it is not known when she became queen. Based on the prominence of Thyra seen in the runestone record, it has been proposed that Thyra may have been of the pre-existing royal line and that Gorm became king through marriage with her.

Historians widely agree that she and Gorm were the parents of Harald Bluetooth, who commissioned the Jelling 2 runestone in their honour, and to a lesser extent it is agreed that they also had a son called Canute. The Historia Norwegiæ additionally claims that they had a daughter, Gunnhild, Mother of Kings, though this is not corroborated by any other evidence. Further details of her marriage and children are provided in the Gesta Danorum and the Jómsvíkinga saga, among other medieval sources. However, these sources are subject to great scrutiny and do not provide a consensus on her life.

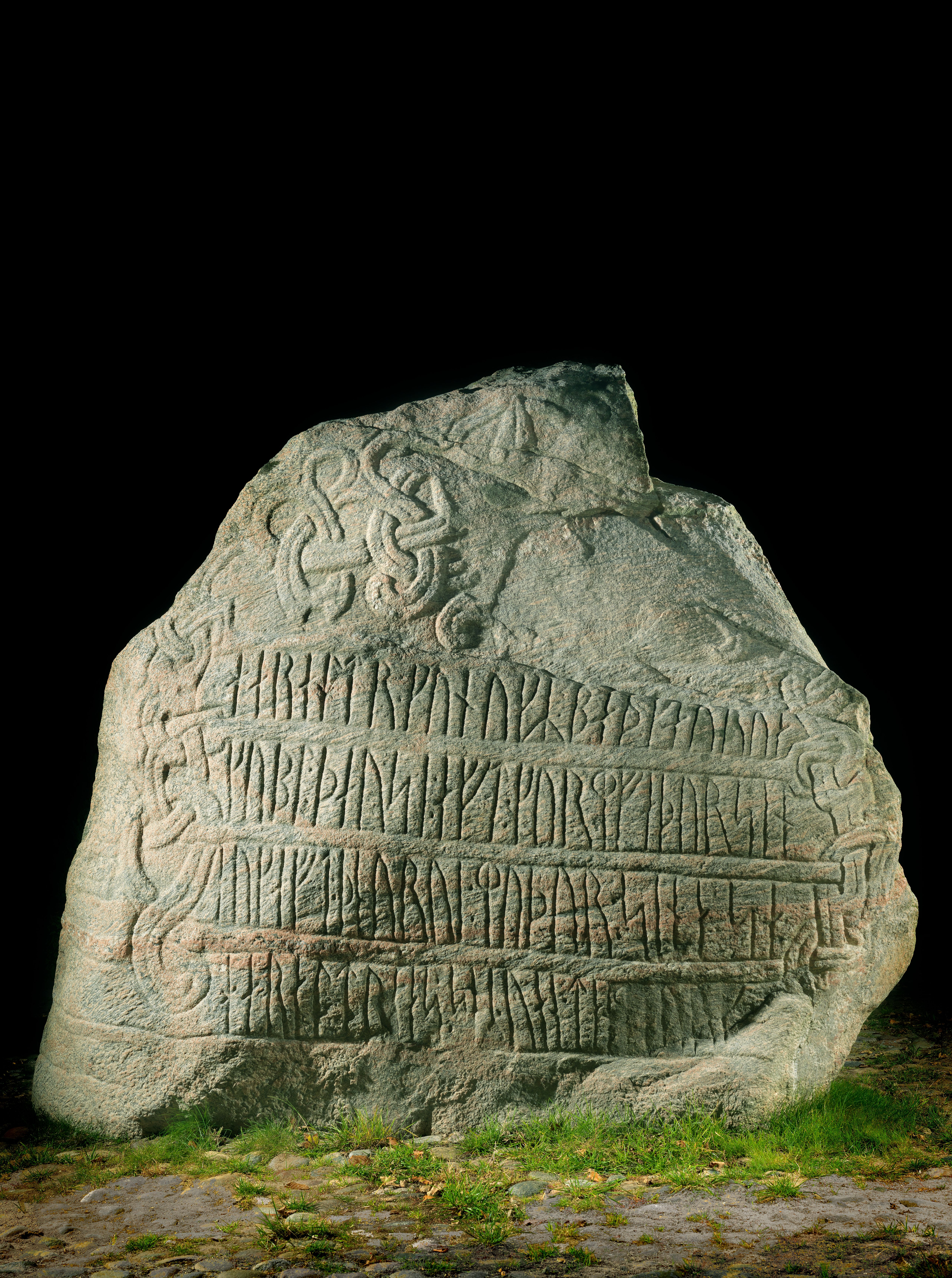
The Jelling 2 stone, commissioned by Harald Bluetooth in honour of his parents, Thyra and Gorm the Old.

==== Gesta Danorum ====
The Gesta Danorum claims that Thyra stood out as a serious and cunning woman and said that she would not marry Gorm until she had all of Denmark as her dowry. When this was agreed, she was betrothed to him but asked him not to have sex with her when they shared a bed for the first three nights until she had had a vision that their marriage would go well. Gorm agreed and laid a drawn sword between them in the bed, and at night he dreamed that a large bird and a smaller one flew out of his wife's womb and flew up into the sky and sat on each of his hands. Again they flew off and came back but the third time when they flew away, only the smaller bird came back and its wings were covered in blood. At this, Gorm woke and cried out, telling his vision to his servants and Thyra took it to mean that they would have children together. She later gave birth to Canute and Harald.

=== Strengthening of the Danevirke ===
Aggesen and Saxo Grammaticus record that Thyra was a wise and steadfast queen who ordered the building of the Danevirke, a system of fortifications built to protect Denmark from invaders from the south. According to Aggesen, Thyra ordered the construction of the Danevirke as part of her plan to end Denmark's role as a tributary to the Kingdom of Germany. She is reported to have deceived the German emperor into believing that the fortifications she was constructing on the border were to protect Germany from an invasion from her husband Gorm. The Historia Norwegiæ further attests to Thyra's wisdom, contrasting her astuteness with the foolishness of Gorm.

The first phase of construction has been shown to predate Thyra's reign, with some trees in the fortification having been felled in 737 CE, however the defences were extended significantly several times until the 12th-century CE.

== Death and burial ==
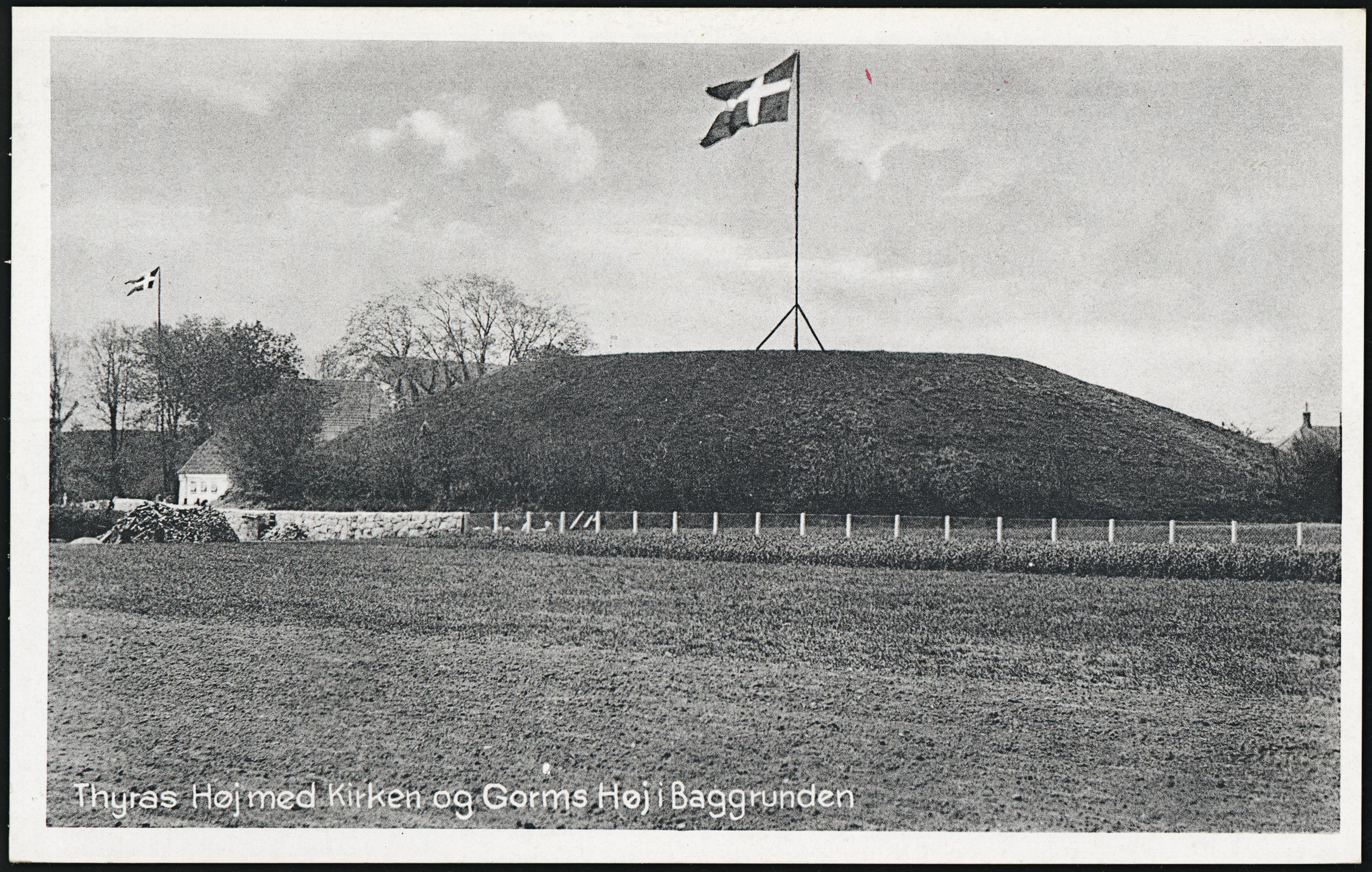
Thyras Høj, a barrow at Jelling, traditionally identified as the grave of Queen Thyra.

The northern howe at Jelling, the seat of power for Gorm's dynasty, is traditionally known as Thyras Høj ("Thyra's mound"), with the southern as Gorm's, although when excavated, no evidence of a body was found in it. Wooden artefacts from the howe have however been dated by tree-ring analysis to 959-960 CE which would put this as the latest date for Thyra's death if it is indeed her grave.

It has been proposed that her burial in the larger, northern barrow is consistent with the idea of her as a prominent woman who may have been even more powerful than her husband Gorm.

Gorm died around 963 CE and while Saxo records in Gesta Danorum that Thyra died after her husband, it is typically believed that Thyra died before Gorm due to the Jelling 1 stone which he raised to commemorate her.

== Runestones ==
Along with two runestones at the royal site of Jelling dating to the mid 10th century CE, the name Thyra is recorded on five more from Viking Age Denmark - Laeborg (DR 26), Bække 1 and 2 (DR 29 and 30), Horne (DR 34) and Randbøl (DR 40). Although all seven stones reference a woman called Thyra, it has been debated whether they refer to the same person.

It has been proposed however, based on analysis of factors such as groove depth, rune shape and spelling, that a single runecarver named Ravnunge-Tue (who is one of the earliest known Western European artisans to have carved his name on his work as the maker) wrote the inscriptions both on the Læborg and Jelling 2 stones, while another individual carved the Horne, Bække and possibly the Randbøl stones. From this, it has been argued that the Jelling stones, the Læborg stone and Bække 1 commemorate the same woman named Thyra. If correct, she would be recorded on at least four runestones - the most for anyone in Viking Age Denmark, exceeding both Gorm the Old and Harald Bluetooth. Following this, it has been suggested that she was either one of the individuals or even the leading figure who drove the assembly of the Danish kingdom.

== Modern influences ==
- Asteroid 115 Thyra is named after her.
- Danebod, a district in Minnesota in the USA

== Gallery ==
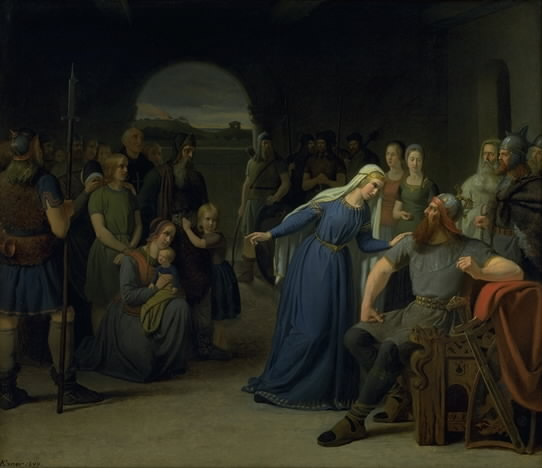
"Thyra Danebod tries to appease Gorm the Old's anger against some captive Christians" by Julius Exner, 1849.

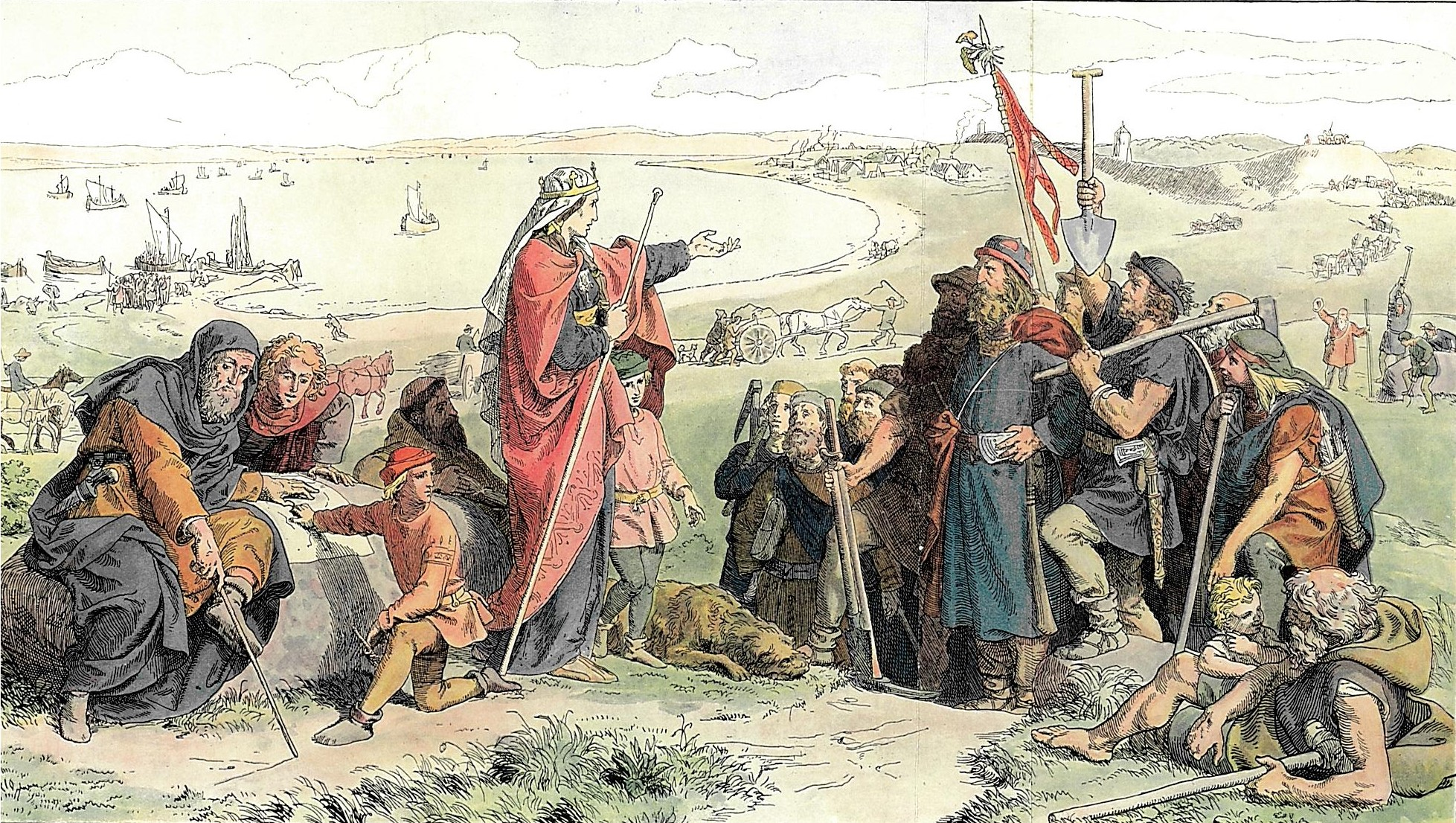
"Thyra Dannebod establishes the Danevirke" by Lorenz Frølich, 1855.

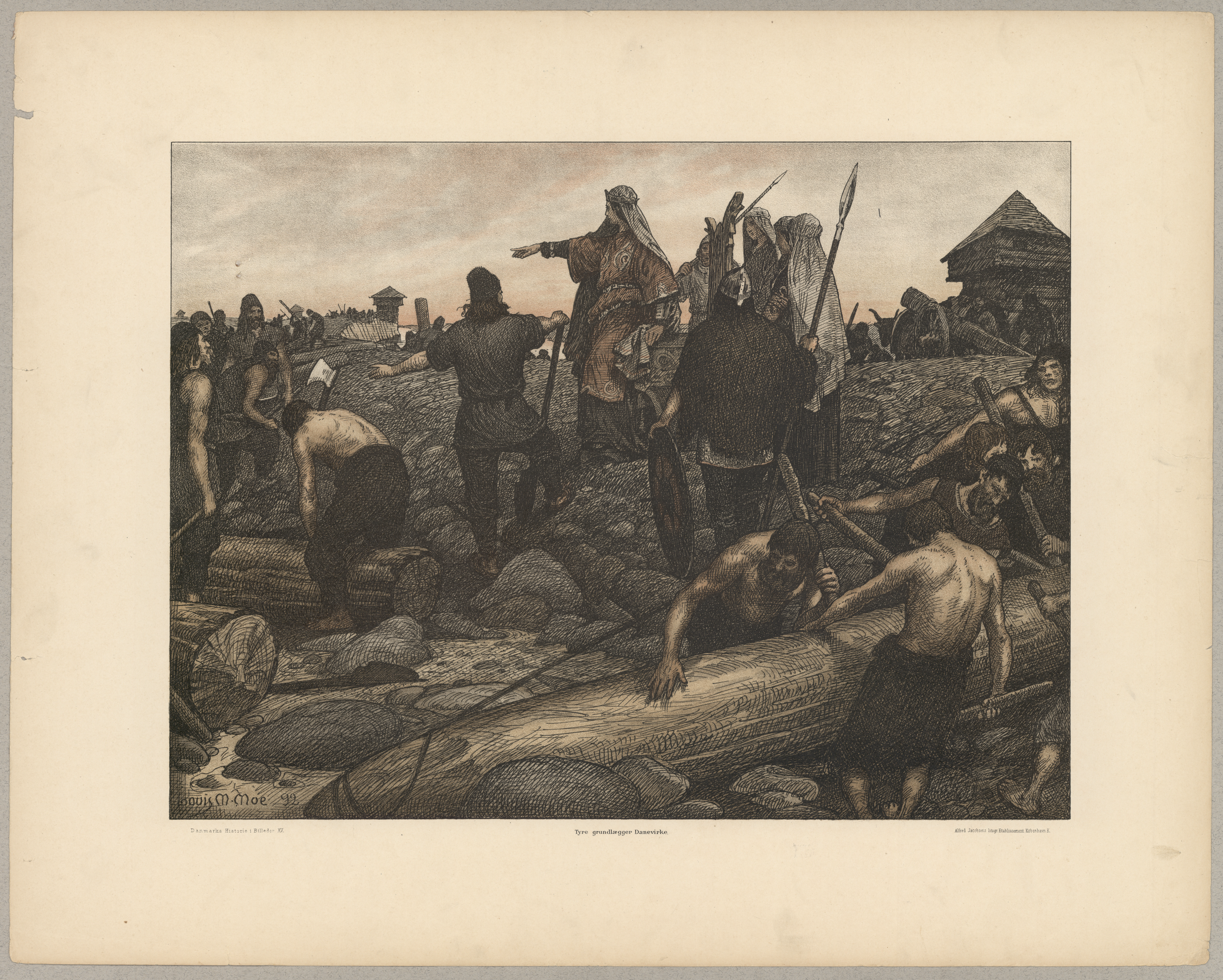
"Thyra establishes the Danevirke" by Louis Moe, 1898.

== See also ==
- Æthelflæd
- Jelling stone ship

== Bibliography ==
=== Primary ===
- Saxo Grammaticus. Gesta Danorum [Deeds of the Danes] (in Latin).
  The Danish History, Books I-IX [Deeds of the Danes]. Translated by Elton, Oliver. Project Gutenberg. 2006.
- Jómsvíkíngasaga [Saga of the Jomsvikings] (in Old Norse).
  "Jómsvíkíngasaga". www.heimskringla.no (in Old Norse).
- Sturluson, Snorri. "Saga Hálfdanar svarta" [Saga of Halfdan the Black]. Heimskringla (in Old Norse).
  "Saga Hálfdanar svarta". www.heimskringla.no (in Old Norse).
  "Halfdan the Black Saga". sacred-texts.
- Historia Norwegiæ [History of Norway] (in Latin).
  Phelpstead, Carl, ed. (2001). History of Norway and the Passion and Miracles of the Blessed Óláfr (PDF). Vol. 13. Translated by Kunin, Devra. University College London: Viking Society for Northern Research. ISBN 978-0-903521-48-2.

=== Secondary ===
- Bregnsbo, Michael; Jensen, Kurt Villads (2022). "The Christian Empire of the North Sea". The Rise and Fall of the Danish Empire. Springer International Publishing. pp. 25–49. doi:10.1007/978-3-030-91441-7_3. ISBN 978-3-030-91440-0.
- Dobat, Andres Siegfried (2015). "Viking stranger-kings: the foreign as a source of power in Viking Age Scandinavia, or, why there was a peacock in the Gokstad ship burial?". Early Medieval Europe. 23 (2): 161–201. doi:10.1111/emed.12096. ISSN 1468-0254.
- Hollander, Lee M. (1928). "Queen Thyra Danmarkarbót". Scandinavian Studies and Notes. 10 (4): 111–114. ISSN 1544-2063. JSTOR 40915261.
- Imer, Lisbeth M.; Åhfeldt, Laila Kitzler; Zedig, Henrik (2023). "A lady of leadership: 3D-scanning of runestones in search of Queen Thyra and the Jelling Dynasty". Antiquity. 97 (395): 1262–1278. doi:10.15184/aqy.2023.108. hdl:109.1.5/278f33bd-facb-4a43-9a01-17d47ece79fa. ISSN 0003-598X.
- Jones, Gwyn (1973). A History of the Vikings. Oxford University Press. p. 114. ISBN 0192850636.
- Kjær, Lars (15 January 2021). "Remembering the Vikings in Thirteenth-Century England and Denmark". Thirteenth Century England XVII: Proceedings of the Cambridge Conference, 2017. Boydell & Brewer. pp. 1–22. doi:10.2307/j.ctv18x4jbg.7. ISBN 978-1-80010-113-5.
- Lund, Niels (2020). Jellingkongerne: og deres forgængere. Roskilde: Vikingeskibsmuseet i Roskilde. ISBN 978-87-85180-75-9.
- Ramskou, Thorkild (1963). Danmarks Historie (in Danish). Vol. 2. Copenhagen: Politiken. pp. 230–235.
- Randsborg, Klavs (16 April 2008). "Kings' Jelling: Gormormorm & Thyrahyrahyrahyra's Palace Harald's Monument & Grave - Svend's Cathedral". Acta Archaeologica. 79 (1): 1–23. doi:10.1111/j.1600-0390.2008.00107.x. ISSN 0065-101X.
- Sawyer, P.H. (1982). Kings and Vikings: Scandinavia and Europe, AD 700-1100. London: Methuen Publishing. pp. 15–17. ISBN 0416741800.
- Sawyer, Birgit (2000). The Viking-age Rune-stones: Custom and Commemoration in Early Medieval Scandinavia. Oxford University Press. ISBN 978-0-19-820643-9.
- Upham, Warren (2001). Minnesota Place Names: A Geographical Encyclopedia. Minnesota Historical Society Press. ISBN 978-0-87351-396-8.
- Whitbread, L. (1967). ""BEOWULF" AND ARCHAEOLOGY: Two Footnotes". Neuphilologische Mitteilungen. 68 (1): 28–35. ISSN 0028-3754. JSTOR 43342324.

Thyra Born: c. 10th century
Preceded by Asfrid ?	Royal consort of Denmark; 10th century CE	Succeeded by Tove or Gunhild ?
