= Julius Döring =

Baltic German painter and archaeologist (1818–1898)

- Born: Friedrich Julius Döring; 31 August 1818; Dresden, Kingdom of Saxony
- Died: 26 September 1898 (aged 80); Mitau, Russian Empire (Now Jelgava, Latvia)
- Education: Dresden Academy of Fine Arts
- Occupations: Painter, historian, archaeologist, librarian

Julius Döring (31 August 1818 – 26 September 1898) was a Baltic German painter, drawing teacher, historian, archaeologist, librarian and museum worker.

== Biography ==
Friedrich Julius Döring was born on 31 August 1818 in Dresden, Kingdom of Saxony. He attended the Dresden Academy of Fine Arts. From 1838 he was trained there by Eduard Bendemann as portrait and history painter. In 1844, he traveled through southern Germany and northern Italy, drawing costumes for the poet E. Duller's "History of the German People" ("Geschichte des deutschen Volks").

After the painting of his first altar painting in 1845 in Poznań, he was invited to Mitau to work as a drawing teacher at Jelgava Gymnasium, in addition to which he also taught private lessons, was actively engaged in making portraits and painting church altarpieces. Döring was a long-time member of the Kurzeme Society of Literature and Art. Since 1860 he worked as a librarian at the Kurland Provincial Museum and Athenaeum. From 1887, he was a corresponding member of the Learned Estonian Society in Dorpat.

In 1852 he toured Germany, Italy and France. He was interested in the latest literature and spoke French and Italian. He went on a trip to Greece and Palestine in 1885 and 1889.

== Paintings ==
In his lifetime, Döring created 1,106 portraits, 23 altar paintings and three historical genre paintings. Of his portraits, only a few have survived. Portrait orders came most often from landlords and civic circles. Most of his altar paintings have survived. They are conventional and traditional, directly or indirectly following earlier works. Several almost identical repetitions of compositions (churches in Iecava, Jelgava, Salas, Sauka, Bauska) show a typical production.

== Archaeology ==
In 1863 Döring studied stone ships in Bīlava and Birznieks in Talsi Municipality archaeologically. On 14 April 1866, Döring along with August Bielenstein, Edmund Carl Julius Krüger, Ernst August von Raison, and others led excavations in Tērvete (Hofzumberge) and Svētkalns (Heiligenberg).

The activities of Döring as researcher in Lithuania (mainly in the northern part and several objects in central Samogitia) covered a period of twelve years (1876–1887) and were related to Semigallian (Žagarė Second Hill Fort, Sidabrė) and Curonian hill forts (Griežė Second Hill Fort, Apuolė), two burial monuments near Griežė (with C. Boy), the 15-17th-century fortification at the Moliūnai Hill Fort, and other small scale archaeological research or exploration. He described an imported winged brooch found at Adakavas, listed the findings at Griežė tumuli, commented on the article by Tadeusz Dowgird regarding findings at Paluknys. Döring made drawings and plans of some of the locations he visited (Apuolė, Griežė, Moliūnai, Papušiai, Puodkaliai).

== Main published works ==
- Döring J., 1877. Burberg – Ratten? – Auf dem Grenze der Güter Zerrauxt und Bruniwiszki. In: Sitzungsberichte der kurländischen Gesellschaft für Literatur und Kunst aus dem Jahre 1876. Mitau, pp. 37–40.
- Döring J., 1877 a. Der Pełajte-Kałnas und der Pyle-Kalnis von Malung in Littauen. In: Sitzungsberichte der kurländischen Gesellschaft für Literatur und Kunst in Mitau aus dem Jahre 1876. Mitau, pp. 34–37.
- Döring J., 1877 b. Zwei Burgberge in Zerrauxt und Eichenpomusch. In: Sitzungsberichte der kurländischen Gesellschaft für Literatur und Kunst in Mitau aus dem Jahre 1876. Mitau, p. 29.
- Döring J., 1879. Die Semgaller Burgen Ratten und Racketen. In: Sitzungsberichte der kurländischen Gesellschaft für Literatur und Kunst aus dem Jahre 1878. Mitau, pp. 29–51.
- Döring J., 1881. Über die Herkunft der kurländischen Letten. In: Sitzungsberichte der kurländischen Gesellschaft für Literatur und Kunst nebst Veröffentlichungen des kurländischen Provinzial-Museums, aus dem Jahre 1880. Mitau, pp. 47–118.
- Döring J., 1882. Wo die Stelle der 1290 zerstörten Semgallerburg Sydobre wohl zu suchen sein dürfte. In: Sitzungsberichte der kurländischen Gesellschaft für Literatur und Kunst und Veröffentlichungen des kurländischen Provinzial-Museums, aus dem Jahre 1881. Mitau, pp. 65–70.
- Döring J., 1883. Eine altrömische Fibula im Mitauschen Museum, gefunden auf Odachow im Kreise Rossiany. In: Sitzungsberichte der kurländischen Gesellschaft für Litera-tur und Kunst nebst Veröffentlichungen des kurländischen Provinzial-Museums, aus dem Jahre 1882. Mitau, p. 35.
- Döring J., 1883 a. Über Komodderschen Burgberg und über den Pilskaln an der Tatola. Nebst kurzen Notiz über Ratten und Terweten. In: Sitzungsberichte der kurländis-chen Gesellschaft für Literatur und Kunst nebst Veröffentli-chungen des kurländischen Provinzial-Museums, aus dem Jahre 1882. Mitau, pp. 37–41.
- Döring J., 1884. Das erste Vorkommen Kurlands in der Geschichte (Apulia, Hauptstadt der Kuren und die dänische Kirche bei Domesnes). In: Sitzungsberichte der kurländischen Gesellschaft für Literatur und Kunst nebst Veröffentlichungen des kurländischen Provinzial-Museums, aus dem Jahre 1883. Mitau, pp. 63–71.
- Döring J., 1884 a. Die Bauerburg am Spahrne-See bei Ihlen, die mitmassliche Burg Racken der heidnischen Semgallen. In: Sitzungsberichte der kurländischen Gesellschaft für Literatur und Kunst aus den Jahren 1864 bis 1871 (Die Veröffentlichungen des kurländischen Provinzial-Museums inbegriffen). Mitau, pp. 49–53 (317–327).
- Döring J., 1885. Bericht über die Forschungen zur Auffindung der Stadt Apulia. In: Sitzungsberichte der kurländischen Gesellschaft für Literatur und Kunst nebst Veröffentlichungen des kurländischen Provinzial-Museums, aus dem Jahre 1884. Mitau, pp. 8–24.
- Döring J., 1885 a. Die römische Fibel im Mitauschen Museum. In: Sitzungsberichte der kurländischen Gesells chaft für Literatur und Kunst nebst Veröffentlichungen des kurländischen Provinzial-Museums, aus dem Jahre 1884. Mitau, p. 2.
- Döring J., 1886. Noch ein Mal Apulia. In: Rigasche Zeitung. 1886-02-15 (27), Nr. 38, pp. 1–2.
- Döring J., 1887. Ein Burgberg bei Poswol in Litauen. In: Sitzungsberichte der kurländischen Gesellschaft für Literatur und Kunst nebst Veröffentlichungen des kurländischen Provinzial-Museums, aus dem Jahre 1886. Mitau, pp. 26–27.
- Döring J., 1888. Der Pilskaln bei Putkaln südlich von Schoden. In: Sitzungsberichte der kurländischen Gesellschaft für Literatur und Kunst nebst Veröffentlichungen des kurländischen Provinzial-Museums, aus dem Jahre 1887. Mitau, pp. 40–41.
- Döring J., 1888 a. Untersuchung von Apulia bei Schoden. In: Sitzungsberichte der kurländischen Gesellschaft für Literatur und Kunst nebst Veröffentlichungen des kurländischen Provinzial-Museums, aus dem Jahre 1887. Mitau, pp. 32–40.
