= Anundstenen =

Viking Age runestone in Västmanland, Sweden

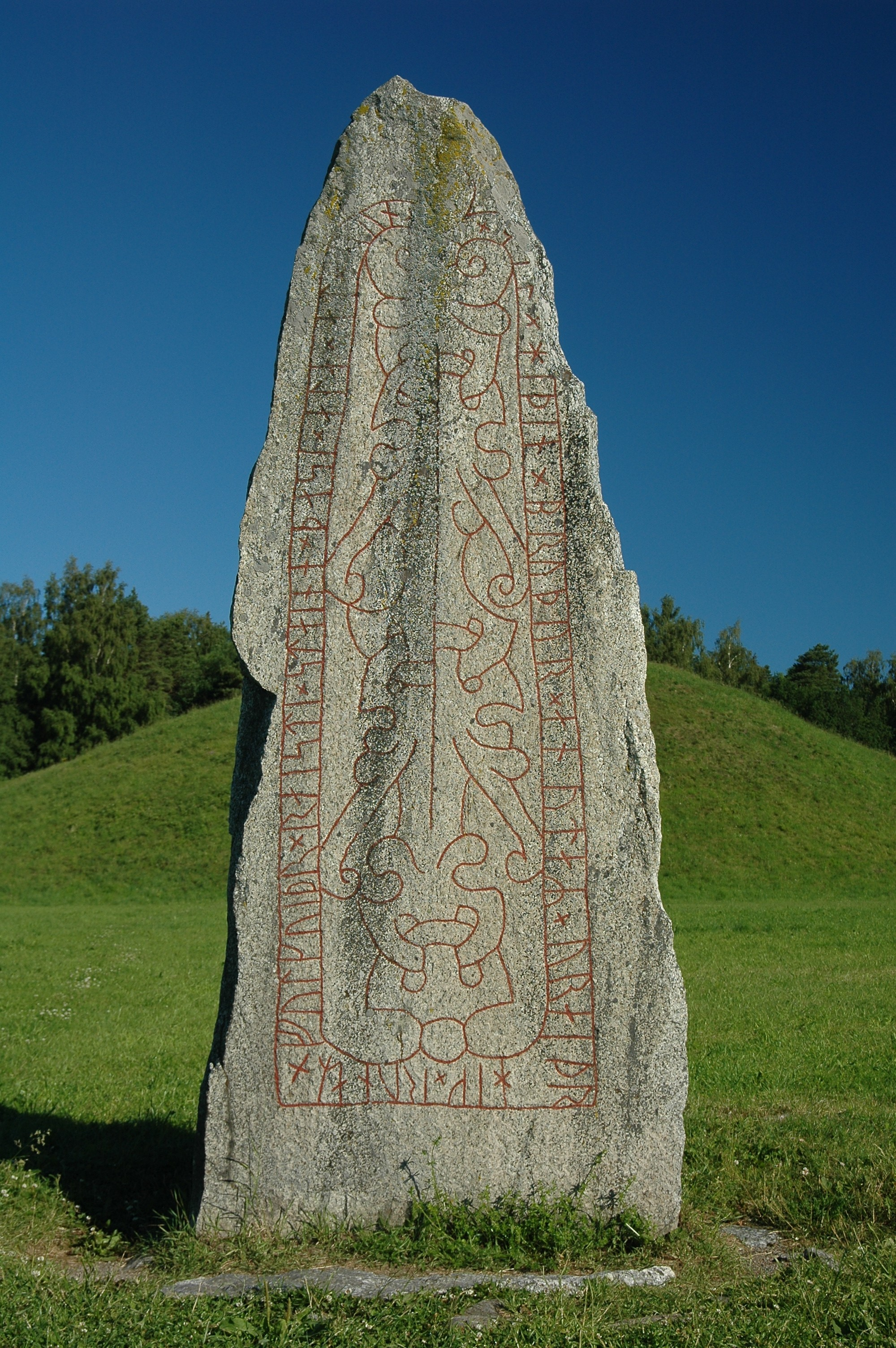
Anundshög runestone, Vs 13

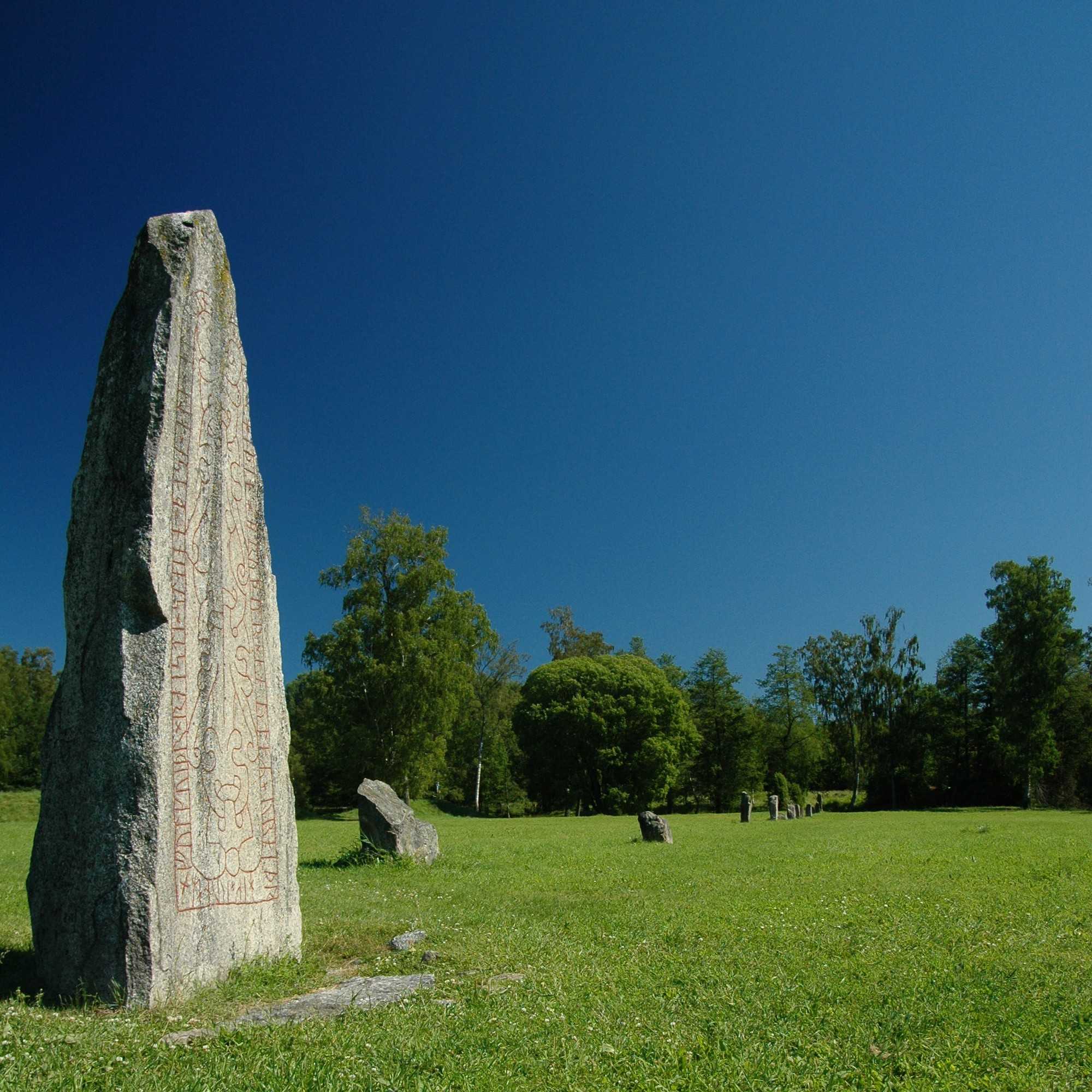
Runestone and some of the line of stones marking Eriksgata

Anundstenen (Vs 13) is a runestone at Anundshög in Västerås Municipality, Västmanland, Sweden. It is registered by the Swedish National Heritage Board (Riksantikvarieämbetet) as Västerås 431:4 (L2002:82).

The runestone is made of granite and is 3.2 metres (10 ft) high. It is 1.3 m (4 ft 3 in) wide at the base and up to 0.8 m (2 ft 7 in) thick. The runic inscription faces south-east, and the runes are 8–14 cm (3–5 1/2 in) high.

The inscription reads:

× fulkuiþr × raisti × staina × þasi × ala × at × sun ×× sin × hiþin × bruþur × anutaʀ × uraiþr hik × runaʀ

Folkviðr ræisti stæina þasi alla at sun sinn Heðin, broður Anundaʀ. Vræiðr hiogg runaʀ.

[Folkvid raised all these stones in memory of his son Heden, Anund's brother. Vred carved the runes.]

— The Swedish National Heritage Board

The Anundstenen is part of the archaeological environment of Anundshög, but is registered separately from the main archaeological site, Västerås 431:1.

The stone dates from approximately 1000–1050, during the Viking Age.
