= Anundshög =

Archaeological site near Västerås, Sweden

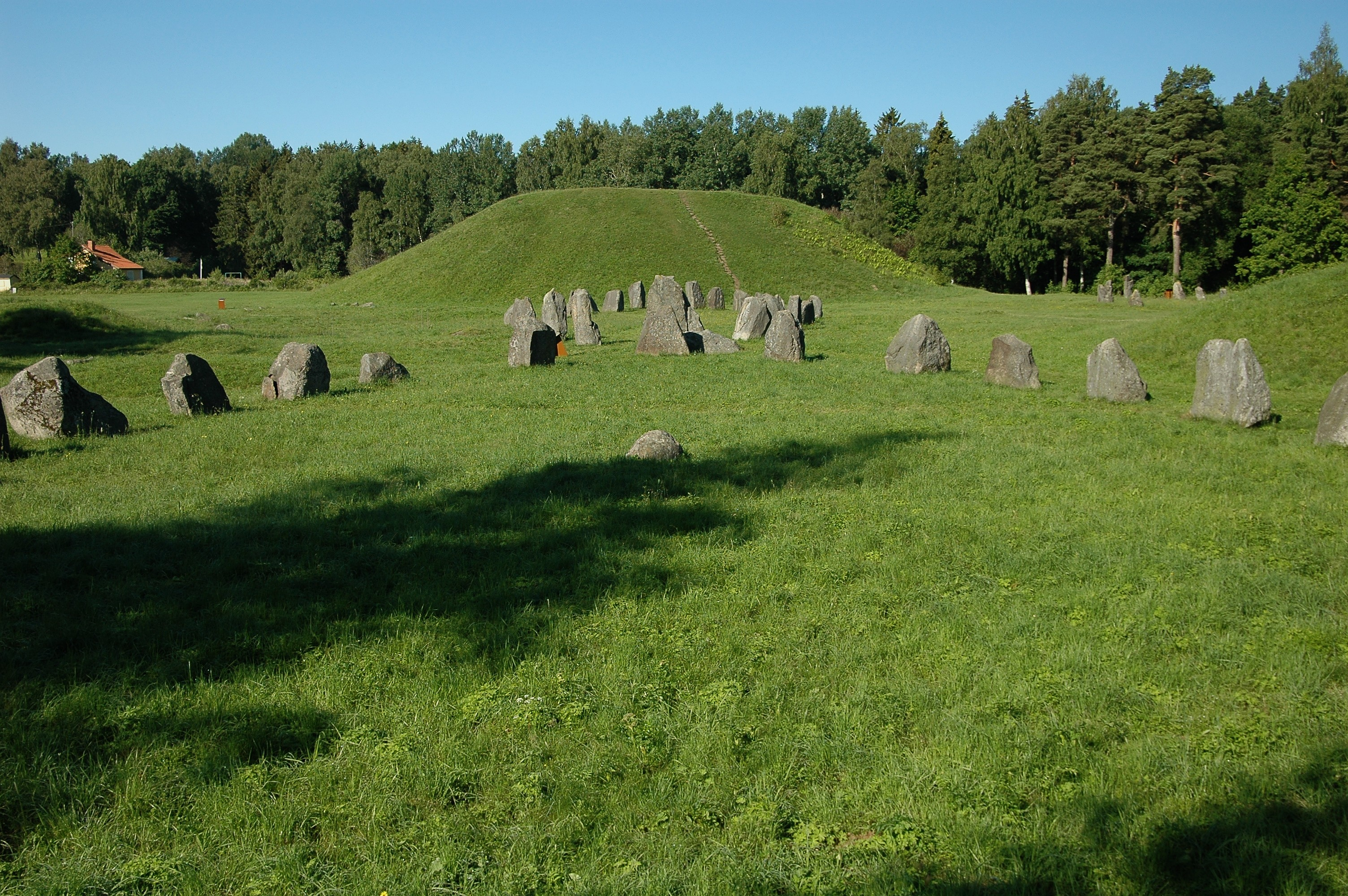
The Anundshög burial mound, June 2006

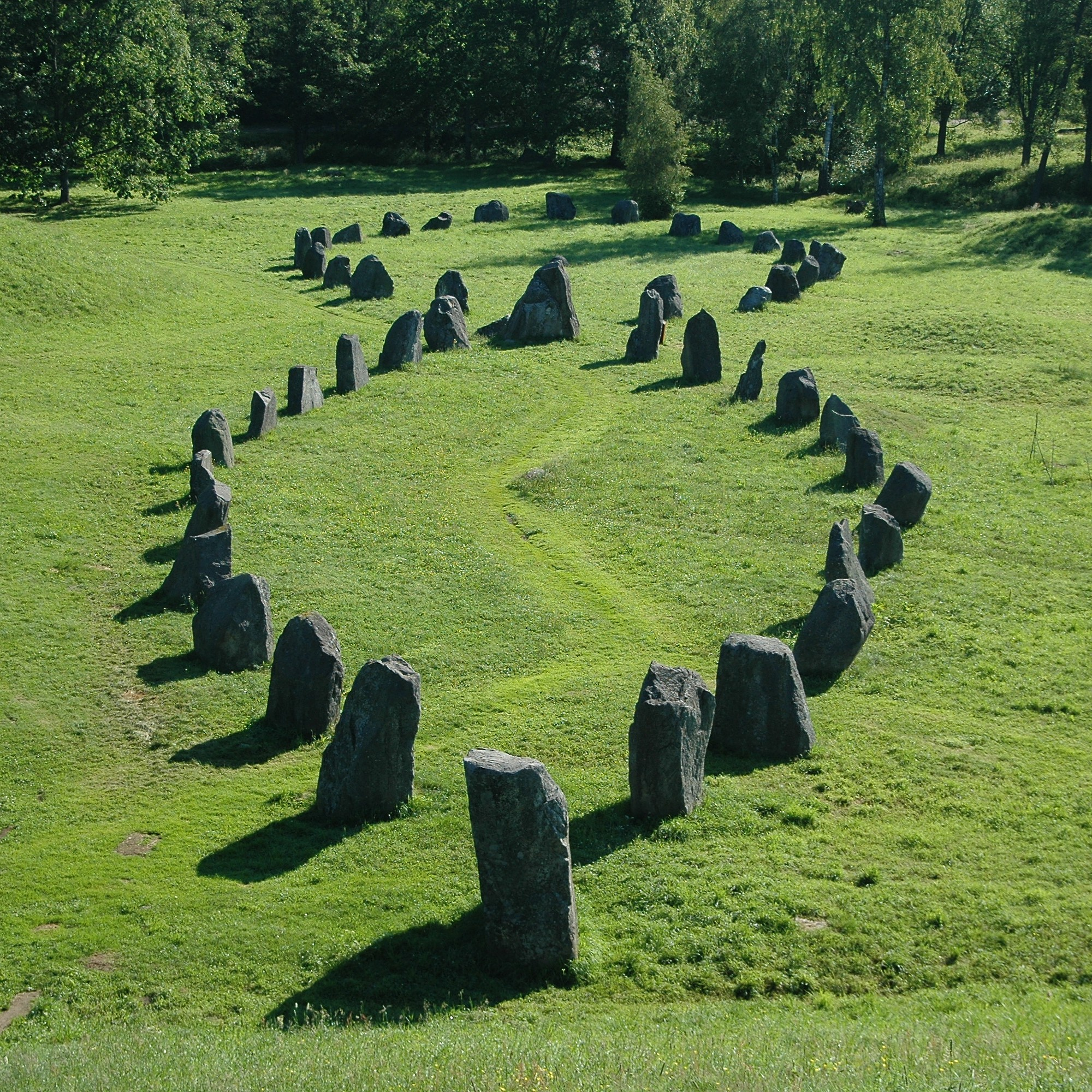
Stone ships, June 2006

Anundshög (also Anunds hög; Swedish pronunciation: [ˈânɵnːdˌhøːɡ]) is an archaeological site near Västerås in Västmanland, Sweden. It is registered by the Swedish National Heritage Board (Riksantikvarieämbetet) as Västerås 431:1 (L2002:241) and covers an area of approximately 215 by 205 metres (705 by 673 ft).

The site comprises 42 archaeological remains:

- 12 burial mounds;
- 10 round stone settings;
- 5 stone ships;
- 14 standing stones;
- 1 runestone.

The largest of the twelve burial mounds is also called Anundshög. It is situated at the western edge of the site. A partial archaeological investigation in 1999 established that the mound is 64–68 m (210–223 ft) in diameter and 9.2 m (30 ft) high. Charcoal from a hearth at its base was radiocarbon dated to between AD 210 and 540; according to the Swedish National Heritage Board, this suggests that the mound dates from the Migration Period to the Viking Age.

The five stone ships are located in the northern part of the site. The two largest are arranged with their prows facing each other and measure approximately 53 by 16 m (174 by 52 ft) and 51 by 25 m (167 by 82 ft) respectively. The other three measure 35, 28 and 23 m (115, 92 and 75 ft) in length. The two largest stone ships were restored in 1932.

The 14 standing stones form a line running from the southern end of the site towards its eastern edge. The Anundstenen (Vs 13) is situated between the second and third standing stones when counted from the south-western end of the site. It is registered separately by the Swedish National Heritage Board as Västerås 431:4. Its inscription commemorates Heden, son of Folkvid and brother of Anund, and names Vred as the carver of the runes.

Medieval documents attest that things were held here in the 14th century, and it has been suggested that the site may also have served as a thing-place during the Viking Age. Archaeological investigations in 2017–2018 revealed the remains of a medieval thing house, which had been established no later than the 14th century.

== See also ==
- Anundstenen
- Västerås
- Vendel Period
