= Bække =

- Town
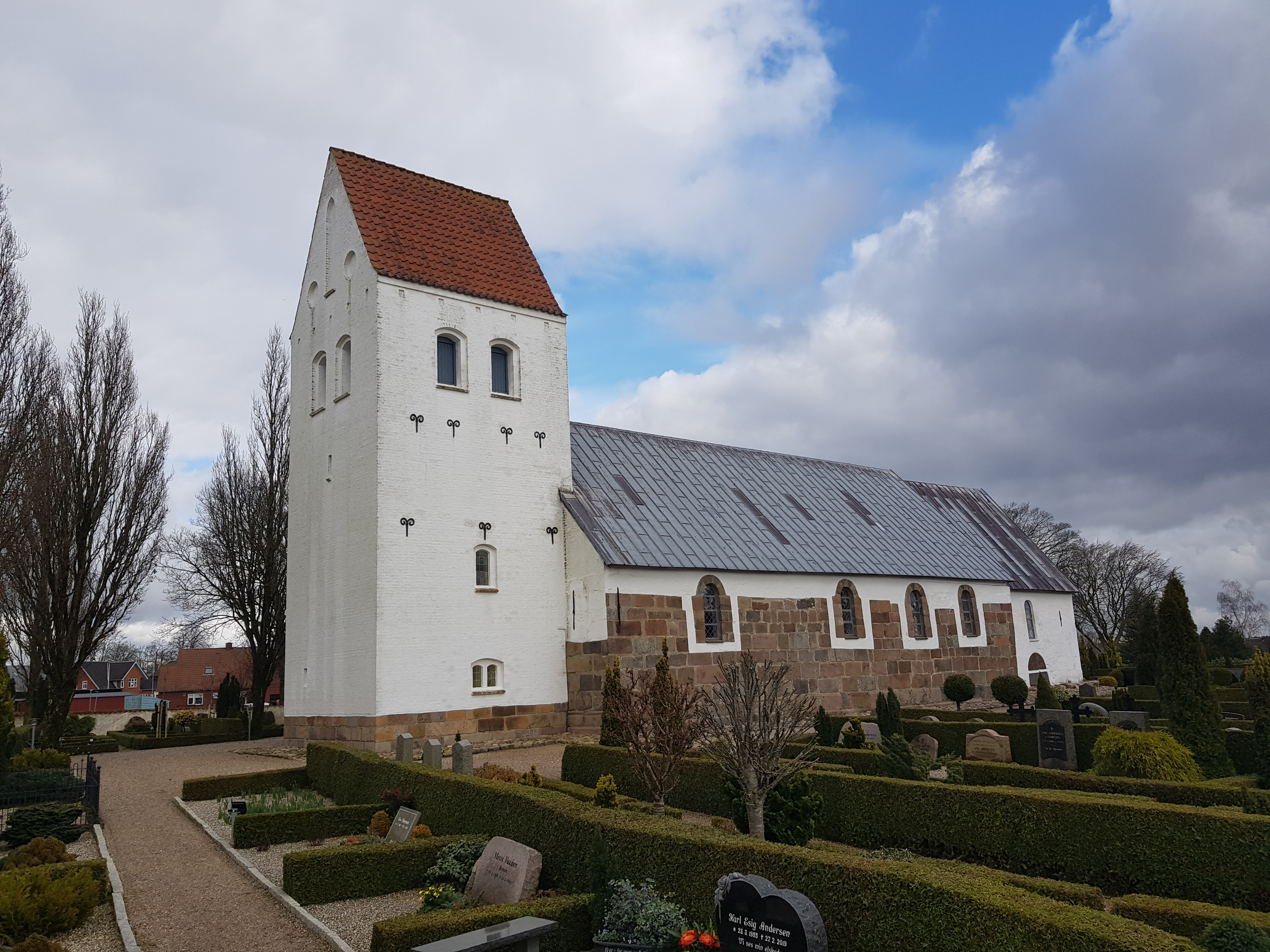
- Bække Church

- Location in the Region of Southern Denmark
- Coordinates: 55°34′20″N 9°8′10″E
- Country: Denmark
- Region: Southern Denmark
- Municipality: Vejen

Area
  - Urban: 0.76 km^{2} (0.29 sq mi)

Population (2026)
  - Urban: 1,042
  - Urban density: 1,400/km^{2} (3,600/sq mi)
- Time zone: UTC+1 (CET)
  - Summer (DST): UTC+2 (CEST)
- Postal code: 6622

Bække is a town in Vejen Municipality, Southern Denmark.

Bække grew up around the road between Ribe and Vejle. The road roughly follows the course of the historic Hærvejen or Ox Road past the church and inn. At an early stage the city extended along the old road and another parallel to the main street. The city currently has a compact form.

By 1917, Bække had a station on the Troldhede to Kolding railway. The railway closed in 1969, but the town still has significance as a hub for bus services. The church, school and most shops are in the middle of the city linked to the main street, Søndergade-Nørregade.

In recent years Bække has experienced an increase in tourism, based on the Hærvejen route and the river Holme Å. The square at the bus station has also been redeveloped with a modern sculpture by Niels Aage Schmidt symbolizing the Hærvejen.

Bække has distinctive historic architecture with several landmark buildings.

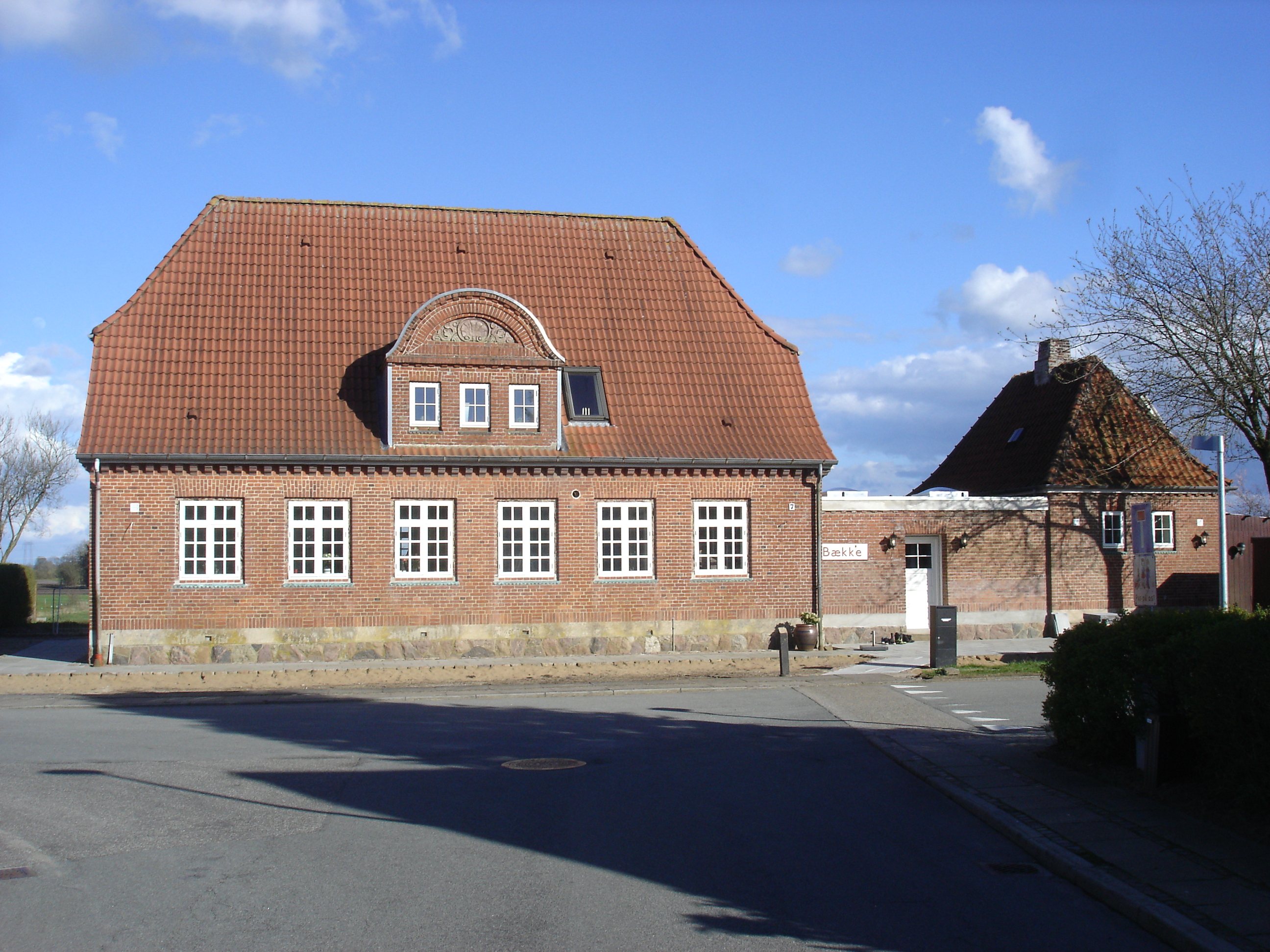
The former railway station

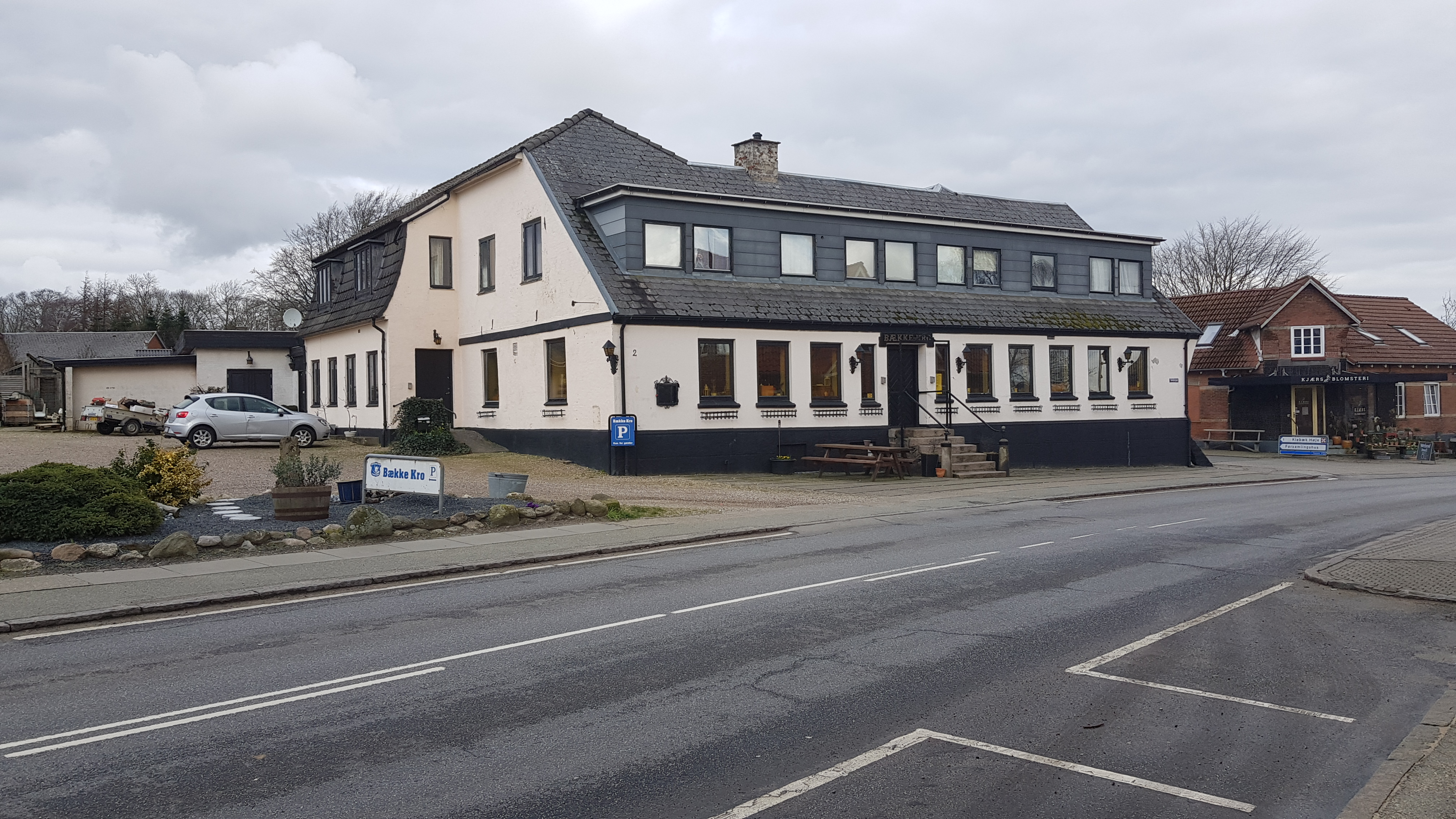
The inn

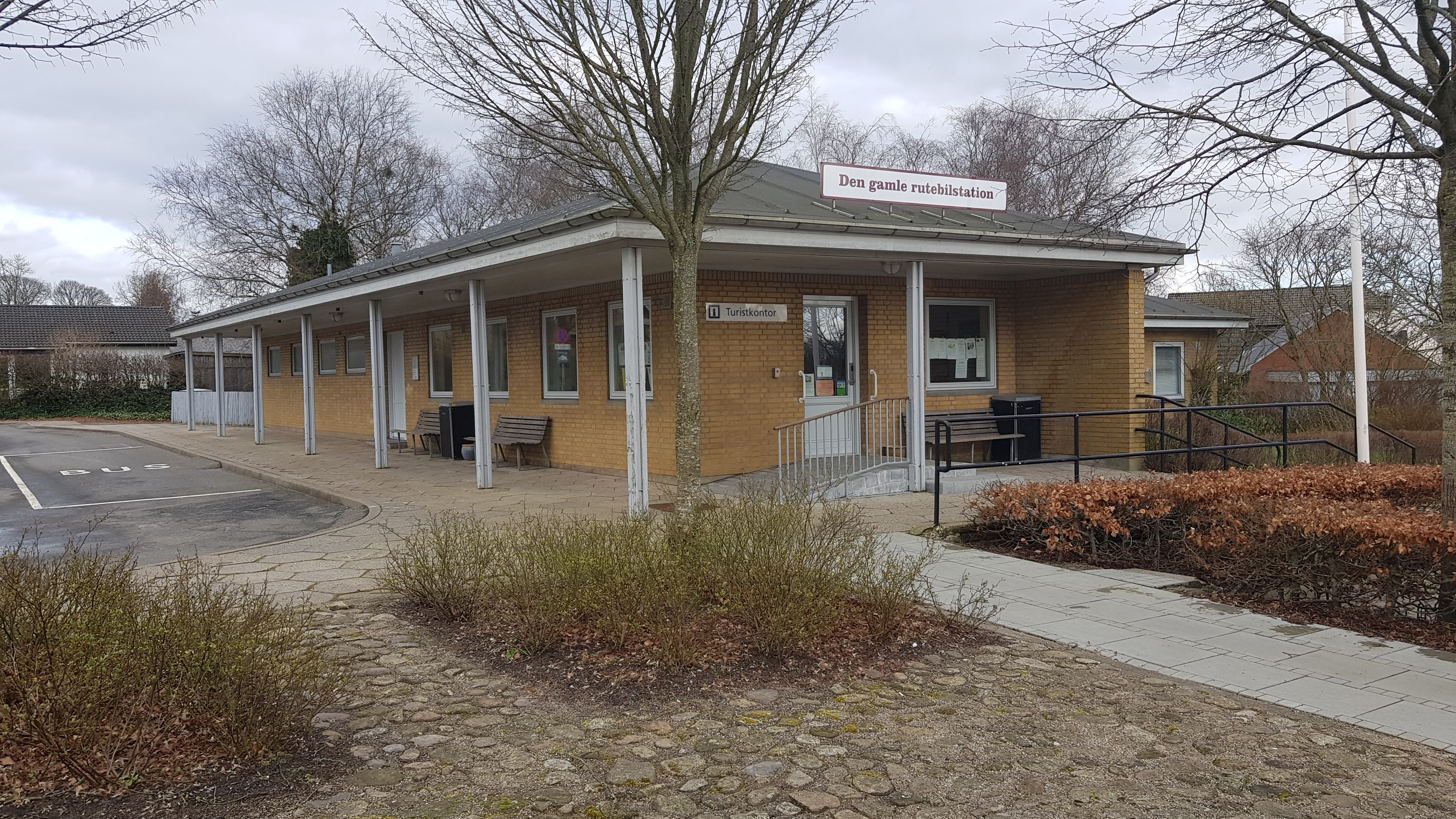
The former bus station, which now serves as a tourist office and small museum related to Hærvejen

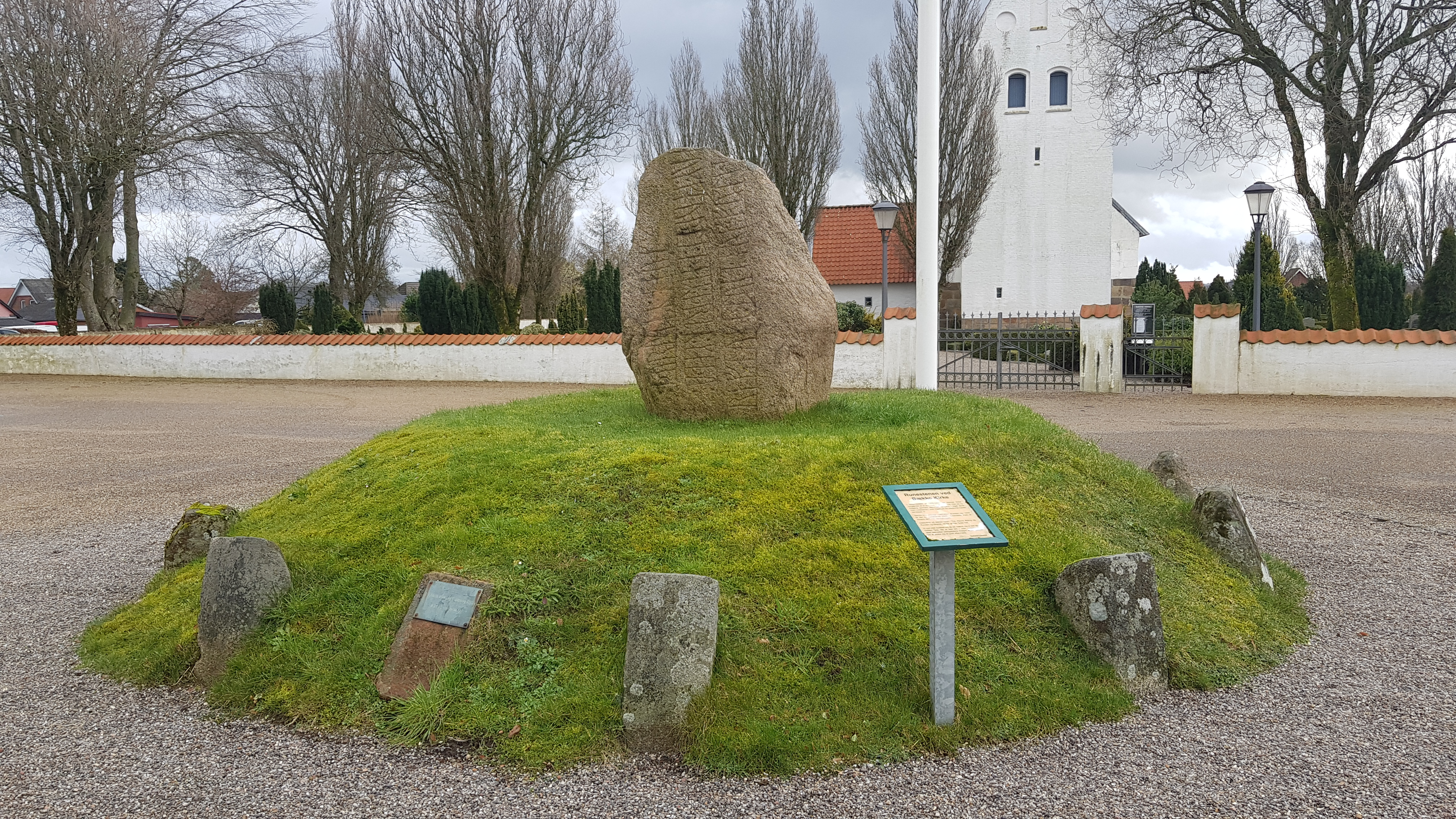
Runestone from 900-950 in front of the church
