= Miķeļbāka =

Lighthouse in Latvia

Miķeļbāka Lightouse
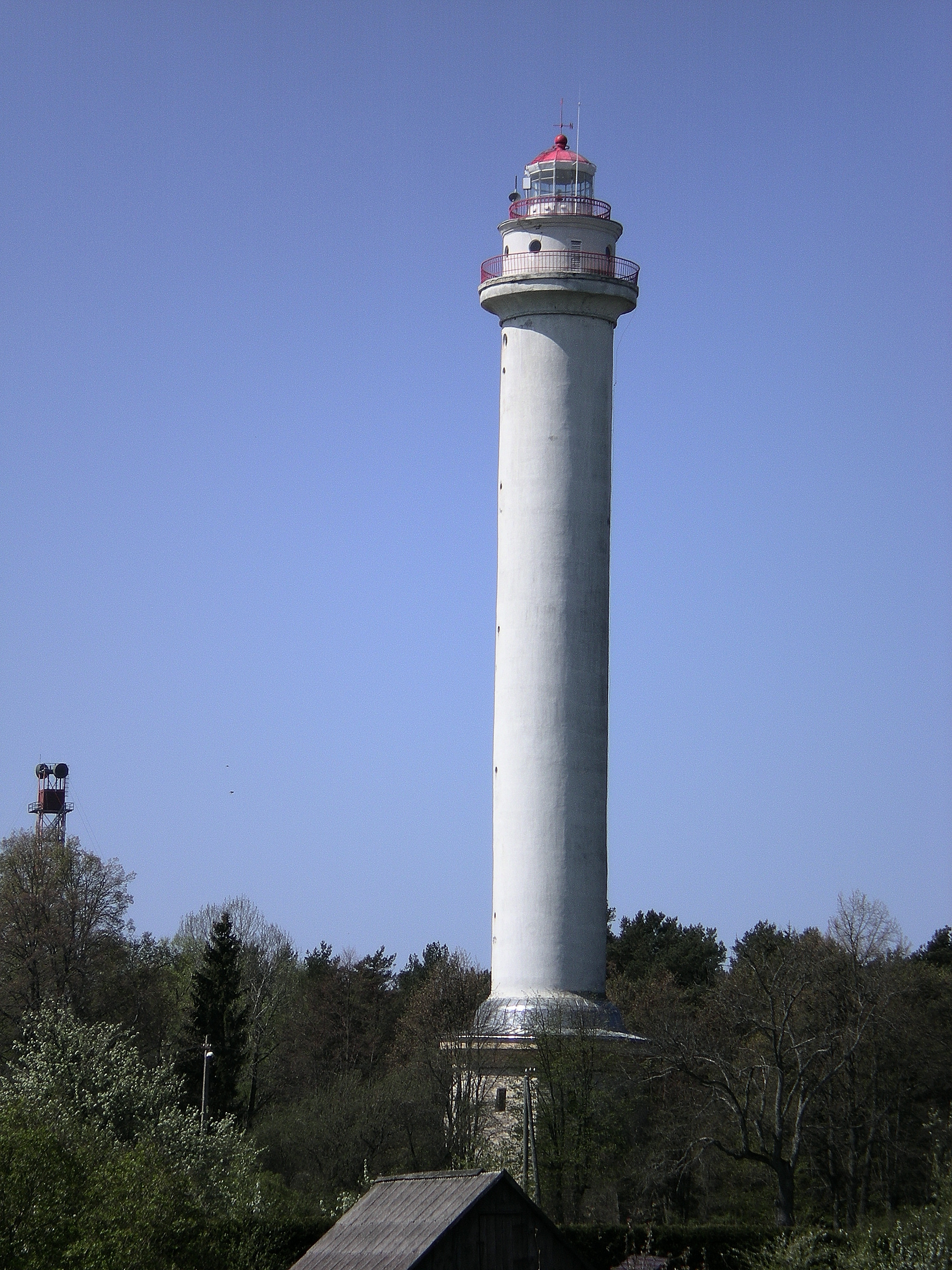
- Miķeļbāka
- Location: Miķeļtornis; Tārgale Parish; Ventspils Municipality; Latvia
- Coordinates: 57°35′59″N 21°58′28″E

Tower
- Constructed: 1885 (first)
- Construction: concrete tower
- Height: 56 metres (184 ft)
- Shape: cylindrical tower with double balcony and lantern
- Markings: white tower, red lantern roof and rail

Light
- First lit: 1957 (current)
- Focal height: 59 metres (194 ft)
- Range: 19 nautical miles (35 km; 22 mi)
- Characteristic: Fl (2) W 6s.
- Latvia no.: UZ-470

Miķeļbāka or Miķeļtornis is the tallest lighthouse in Latvia. It is located in the village of Miķeļtornis, Tārgale Parish, Ventspils Municipality; about 34 kilometres (21 mi) northeast of Ventspils.

== Etymology ==
Legends date origins of the name to 1749, when Latvia was part of the Russian Empire and the coast was surveyed by Mikhail Ryabinin, a Russian midshipman, therefore the lighthouse later built was called Mikhailovsky mayak (Russian: Михайловский маяк – 'Mikhail's lighthouse'). After a period, the name was Latvianised to "Miķeļbāka”. At 56 metres (184 ft) it is the tallest lighthouse tower in the Baltic States.

== History ==
The first tower was completed in 1884 – a cylindrical 55 metres (180 ft) tall brick structure, that—at the time—was the tallest lighthouse in Latvia. An electric light source was installed and supplied with electricity from a power plant in a nearby building. In the early 20th century, cracks began to appear in the tower as still seen today.

=== World War I ===
In 1915 the light source and the generator were transported to Russia. During Germany's occupation of Latvia, they installed an acetylene light source. During World War I, the lighthouse was shelled by artillery. The original lighthouse was patched up, but it had to be demolished in 1932.

=== Independent Latvia (1918–1940) ===
In 1932, a temporary wooden tower, almost as high as the original, was built.Construction of The tower was complicated in September 1934. A German optical device – a 1.76 metres (5 ft 9 in) tall, fixed belt lens – was installed in the new wooden tower. The light source was a Swedish-made, acetylene device. Depending on the distance, the light was either green or white.

=== Soviet occupation (1940–1941; 1944–1990) ===
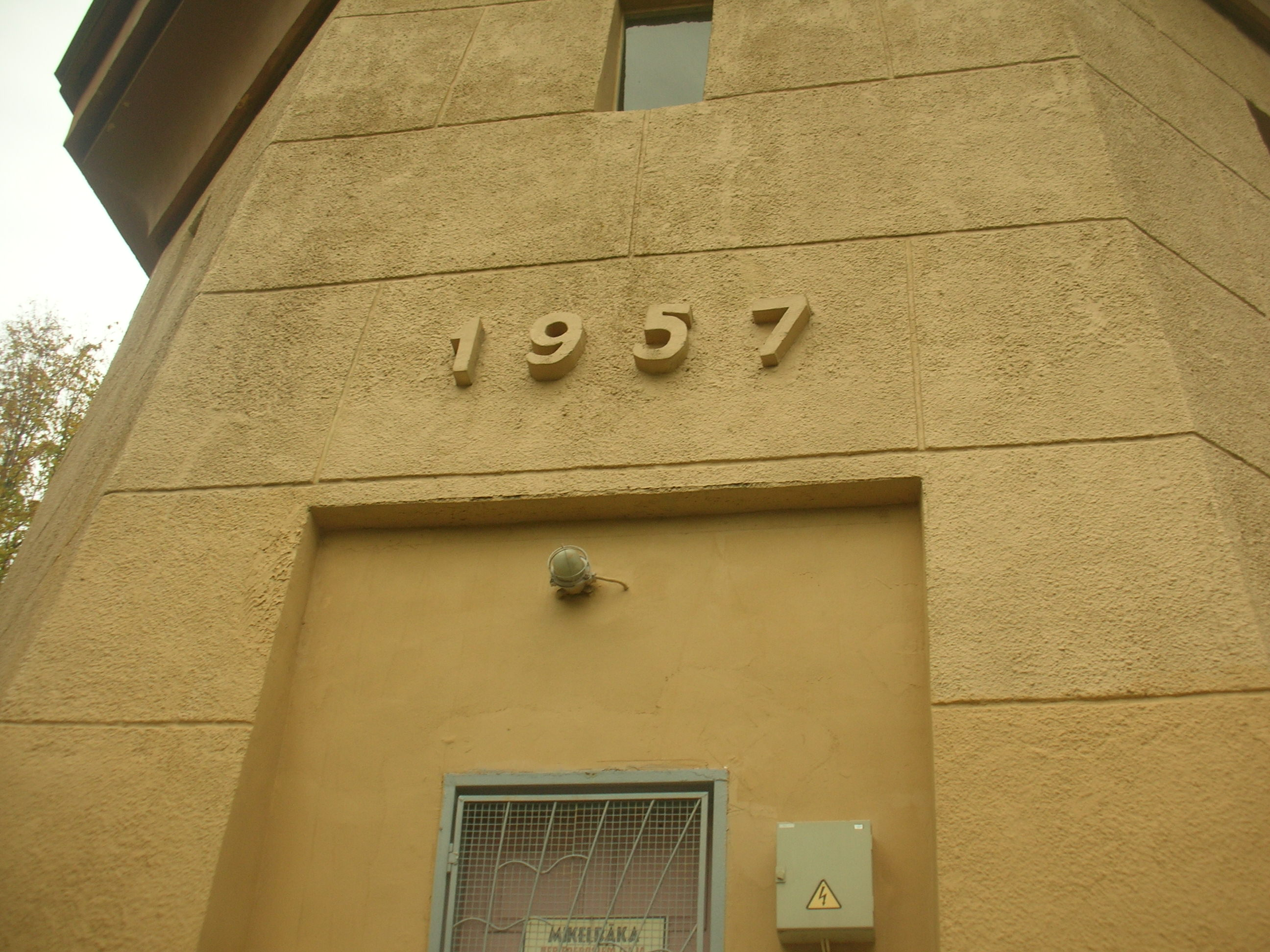
Entrance to the lighthouse

In 1941, during its retreat, the Red Army blew up the wooden lighthouse to keep it out of German hands.

In 1946, a 30 metres (98 ft) tall temporary tower was built.

== Present day ==
The present-day Miķeļbāka lighthouse was built in 1957, documented in the sign above its front door. Two hundred and ninety-three steps lead to the top of the lighthouse, offering a view overlooking the surrounding Kurzeme coast of the Baltic Sea and a lighthouse on the Sõrve Peninsula of Saaremaa that can be seen in fine weather at a distance of 35 kilometres (22 mi). The current tower is 56 metres (184 ft) high, the beacon having a focal height of 59 metres (194 ft) above sea level, making it the tallest in the Baltic states.

== See also ==
- List of lighthouses in Latvia
