= List of lighthouses in Latvia =

This is a list of lighthouses in Latvia. They mark the western coast of the country, which includes parts of the Baltic Sea, the Gulf of Riga, and the Irbe Strait which connects the gulf to the Baltic. Latvian lighthouses date from the Russian Imperial period, and some of the newer ones are built during Soviet period.

Lighthouses in Latvia are monitored and regulated by the Latvian Maritime Administration (Latvian: Latvijas jūras administrācija) and are operated by the local port authorities of Liepāja, Ventspils and Rīga. Some are classified as Latvian Cultural Property of National Importance.

== Lighthouses ==
Name	Image	Coordinates	Water body	Year built	Tower height	Focal height	Range
Ainaži Lighthouse		Ainaži; 57.86638°N 24.36041°E	Gulf of Riga	1930	18 m (59 ft)	22 m (72 ft)	12 nmi (22 km)
Akmeņrags Lighthouse		Pāvilosta; 56.83192°N 21.05730°E	Baltic Sea	1879/1921	38 m (125 ft)	38 m (125 ft)	15 nmi (28 km)
Bernāti Lighthouse		Nīca; 56.38223°N 20.98116°E	Baltic Sea	1962	21 m (69 ft)	41 m (135 ft)	15 nmi (28 km)
Buļļuciems Lighthouse		Jūrmala; 56°59′38.17″N 23°53′12.18″E	Gulf of Riga	1956	28 m (92 ft)	36 m (118 ft)	16 nmi (30 km)
Daugavgrīva Lighthouse		Daugavgrīva; 57.05949°N 24.02157°E	Gulf of Riga	1721/1957	35 m (115 ft)	37 m (121 ft)	18 nmi (33 km)
Ģipka Lighthouse		Roja parish 57.56984°N 22.65753°E	Gulf of Riga	1954	30 m (98 ft)	37 m (121 ft)	15 nmi (28 km)
Liepāja Lighthouse		Liepāja; 56.51681°N 20.99229°E	Baltic Sea	1868	33 m (108 ft)	32 m (105 ft)	16 nmi (30 km)
Miķeļbāka		Miķeļtornis; 57.59988°N 21.96792°E	Irbe Strait	1885/1957	56 m (184 ft)	59 m (194 ft)	14 nmi (26 km)
Mērsrags Lighthouse		Mērsrags; 57.36589°N 23.11994°E	Gulf of Riga	1875	19 m (62 ft)	26 m (85 ft)	15 nmi (28 km)
Kolka Lighthouse		Cape Kolka; 57.80238°N 22.63462°E	Irbe Strait	1875/1884	21 m (69 ft)	20 m (66 ft)	10 nmi (19 km)
Oviši Lighthouse		Tārgale; 57.56867°N 21.71598°E	Irbe Strait	1814	33 m (108 ft)	38 m (125 ft)	15 nmi (28 km)
Pape Lighthouse		Rucava; 56.15488°N 21.02327°E	Baltic Sea	1890/1910	22 m (72 ft)	26 m (85 ft)	14 nmi (26 km)
Ragaciems Lighthouse		Lapmežciems Parish; 57.03450°N 23.48600°E	Gulf of Riga	1960	30 m (98 ft)	37 m (121 ft)	16 nmi (30 km)
Slītere Lighthouse		Slītere National Park; 57.62854°N 22.28915°E	Baltic Sea	1849	24 m (79 ft)	82 m (269 ft)	Inactive
Užava Lighthouse		Užava; 57.20908°N 21.41467°E	Baltic Sea	1869	19 m (62 ft)	44 m (144 ft)	15 nmi (28 km)
Ventspils Lighthouse		Ventspils; 57.405389°N 21.524611°E	Baltic Sea	1970	11 m (36 ft)	14 m (46 ft)	3 nmi (6 km)

== See also ==
- Lists of lighthouses and lightvessels
- List of tallest buildings in Latvia
