= Slītere Lighthouse =

Lighthouse in Latvia

Slītere Lighthouse Slīteres bāka
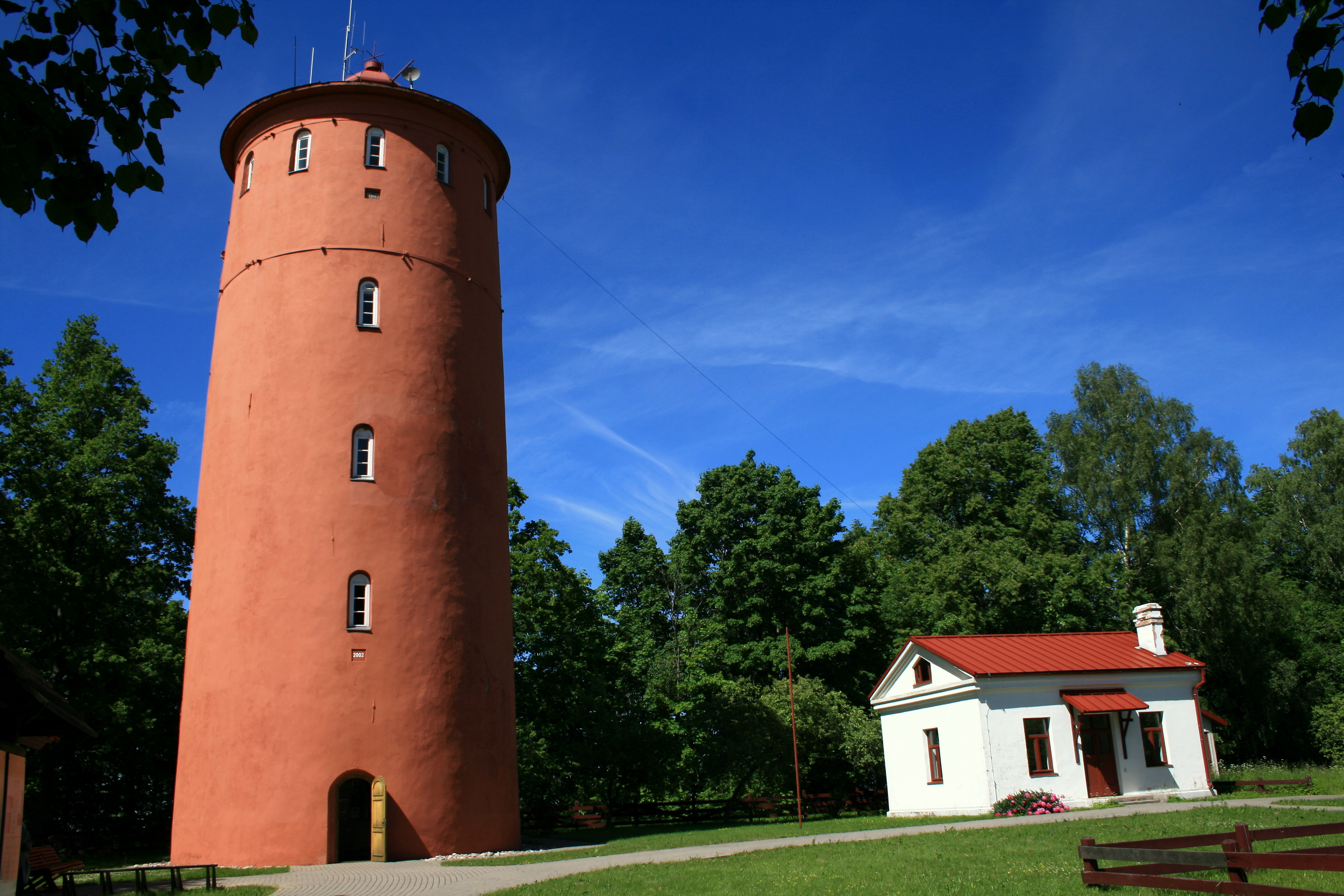
- Slītere Lighthouse
- Location: Dundaga; Latvia
- Coordinates: 57°37′43.6″N 22°17′20.6″E

Tower
- Constructed: 1849
- Construction: limestone tower
- Height: 24 metres (79 ft)
- Shape: large cylindrical tower with balcony and lantern
- Markings: red tower
- Operator: Slītere National Park

Light
- First lit: 1961
- Deactivated: 1999
- Focal height: 82 metres (269 ft)
- Characteristic: Fl W 6s

Slītere Lighthouse (Latvian: Slīteres bāka) is an inactive lighthouse located on the Latvian coast of the Baltic Sea.

== History ==
The lighthouse was built between 1849 and 1850; however the area historically, since the eleventh century, has been a site of plunderers who lit misleading signal-fires to confuse passing ships, causing them to run aground, once wrecked they would be raided of their cargo. The site of the lighthouse may have been an ancient holy place as old maps refer to the locality as Temple Mount (Domkalns), and Church Hill (Baznīckalns). Towards the end of the nineteenth century Baron Osten-Sacken cut-down a number of trees; making this a key-location spot for fishermen in the area; which is why the 24 metre stone lighthouse was built there between 1849 and 1850. The lighthouse is located in the Slītere National Park, which now maintains the lighthouse and its surroundings. The light has a focal height of 82 metres above sea level, making it the highest light in Latvia until it was deactivated in 1999. The lighthouse is the second oldest in Latvia, the oldest being that of Ovisi which first entered service in 1814.

== See also ==
- List of lighthouses in Latvia
