= SMS Prinz Adalbert (1901) =

German Imperial Navy armored cruiser

Coordinates: 56°33′N 20°18′E

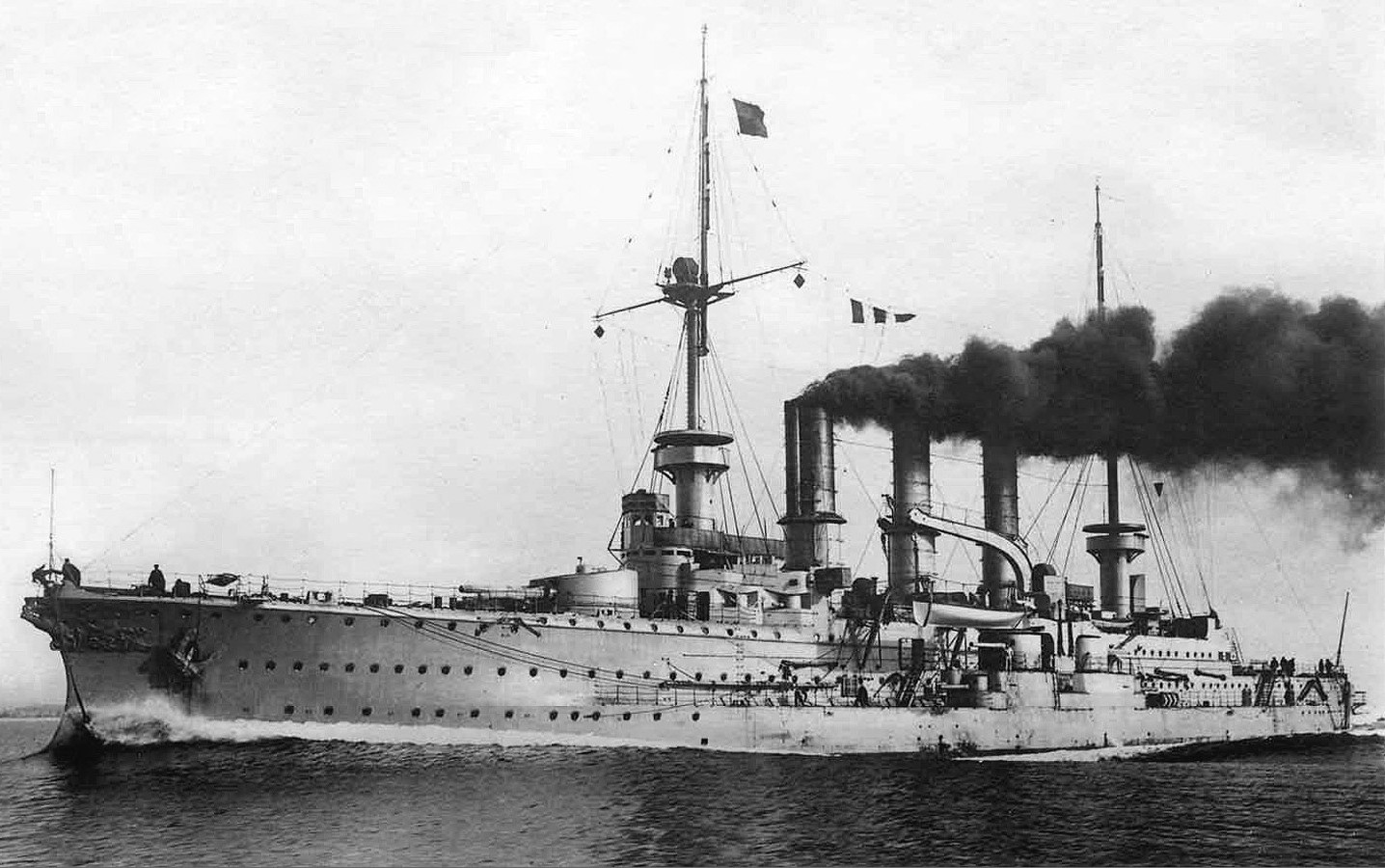
- SMS Prinz Adalbert

History

German Empire
- Name: Prinz Adalbert
- Namesake: SMS Prinz Adalbert
- Builder: Kaiserliche Werft, Kiel
- Laid down: April 1900
- Launched: 22 June 1901
- Christened: Princess Irene of Prussia
- Commissioned: 12 January 1904
- Fate: Torpedoed and sunk 23 October 1915

General characteristics
- Class & type: Prinz Adalbert-class cruiser
- Displacement: Normal: 9,087 metric tons (8,943 long tons); Full load: 9,875 t (9,719 long tons)
- Length: 126.5 m (415 ft) o/a
- Beam: 19.6 m (64 ft 4 in)
- Draft: 7.43 m (24 ft 5 in)
- Installed power: 14 × Dürr water-tube boilers; 16,200 PS (16,000 ihp)
- Propulsion: 3 × screw propellers; 3 × triple-expansion steam engines
- Speed: 20 knots (37 km/h; 23 mph)
- Range: 5,080 nautical miles (9,410 km; 5,850 mi) at 12 knots (22 km/h; 14 mph)
- Complement: 35 officers; 551 enlisted men
- Armament: 4 × 21 cm (8.3 in) SK L/40 guns; 10 × 15 cm (5.9 in) SK L/40 guns; 12 × 8.8 cm (3.5 in) SK L/35 guns; 4 × 45 cm (17.7 in) torpedo tubes
- Armor: Belt: 100 mm (3.9 in); Turrets: 150 mm (5.9 in); Deck: 40 to 80 mm (1.6 to 3.1 in); Conning tower: 150 mm

SMS Prinz Adalbert ('His Majesty's Ship Prince Adalbert') (Note: "SMS" stands for "Seiner Majestät Schiff" ('His Majesty's Ship').) was an armored cruiser built in the early 1900s for the Imperial German Navy. She was named after the earlier screw corvette Prinz Adalbert, and was the lead ship of her class. Prinz Adalbert was built at the Imperial Dockyard in Kiel. Her keel was laid in April 1900, and she was launched in June 1901. Her completion in January 1904 had been delayed by an excess of construction projects at the Imperial Dockyard. She was armed with a main battery of four 21 cm (8.3 in) guns, a significant improvement over the previous armored cruiser, Prinz Heinrich, which carried only two 24 cm (9.4 in) guns. The ship was capable of a top speed of 20 knots (37 km/h; 23 mph).

Upon commissioning, Prinz Adalbert served as a gunnery training ship, a role she held for the majority of her career. She trained with the Home Fleet, later renamed the High Seas Fleet, throughout the early 1900s, and she made several visits to foreign countries. After the outbreak of World War I in July 1914, she was assigned to the reconnaissance forces in the Baltic and was tasked with protecting the German coast from Russian attacks. After her sister ship was sunk in November 1914, she became the flagship of the cruiser squadron in the Baltic. She conducted operations against Russian forces, including bombarding the port of Libau in support of the German Army. She was torpedoed by a British submarine in July 1915, but was able to return to port and was repaired. She was torpedoed a second time on 23 October 1915; the torpedo detonated her ammunition magazines, rapidly sinking the ship. Only three men were rescued from a crew of 675, in the worst German naval loss in the Baltic during the war.

== Design ==
Prinz Adalbert was one of two cruisers in the Prinz Adalbert class; the other was named Friedrich Carl. Both were ordered under the Second Naval Law of 1900, which called for a force of fourteen armored cruisers that would be able to serve in Germany's colonial empire and scout for the main German fleet in home waters. The need to fill both roles was the result of budgetary limitations, which prevented Germany from building vessels specialized to each task. The Prinz Adalbert design was based on that of the previous armored cruiser, Prinz Heinrich, but incorporated a more powerful armament and more comprehensive armor protection.

=== Characteristics ===
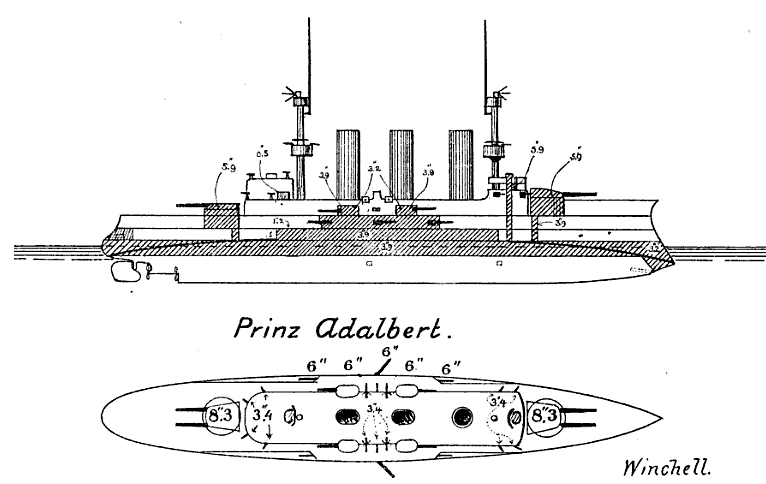
Line-drawing of Prinz Adalbert; the shaded areas represent the portions of the ship protected by armor

Prinz Adalbert displaced 9,087 metric tons (8,943 long tons) as built and 9,875 t (9,719 long tons) fully loaded. She had an overall length of 126.5 m (415 ft), a beam of 19.6 m (64 ft 4 in) and a draft of 7.43 m (24 ft 5 in) forward. She had a raised forecastle deck and a pronounced ram bow. Her superstructure consisted of a small, armored conning tower forward and a larger but unprotected structure further aft that had a small, lightly armored secondary conning position atop it. She was fitted with a pair of short military masts, which stepped down to lighter poles to reduce weight high in the ship. Her crew consisted of 35 officers and 551 enlisted men.

She was powered by three vertical triple-expansion steam engines that drove three screw propellers. Steam was provided by fourteen coal-fired Dürr water-tube boilers, which were vented through three funnels. The engines were rated to produce 16,200 metric horsepower (16,000 ihp) for a maximum speed of 20 knots (37 km/h; 23 mph), though she slightly exceeded these figures on speed trials. She carried up to 1,630 t (1,600 long tons; 1,800 short tons) of coal, which enabled a maximum range of up to 5,080 nautical miles (9,410 km; 5,850 mi) at a cruising speed of 12 knots (22 km/h; 14 mph).

Prinz Adalbert was armed with four 21 cm (8.3 in) SK L/40 guns arranged in two twin-gun turrets, (Note: In Imperial German Navy gun nomenclature, "SK" (Schnelladekanone) denotes that the gun is quick loading, while the L/40 denotes the length of the gun. In this case, the L/40 gun is 40 calibers, meaning that the gun is 40 times as long as it is in bore diameter.) one on either end of the superstructure, a significant improvement over Prinz Heinrich, which carried only two guns in single turrets. Her secondary armament consisted of ten 15 cm (5.9 in) guns, which were mounted individually in four single-gun turrets and six casemates. These were clustered amidships, with two turrets and three casemates per broadside. For defense against torpedo boats, she carried a battery of twelve 8.8 cm (3.5 in) guns, also in individual mounts. She was also equipped with four 45 cm (17.7 in) underwater torpedo tubes, one in the bow, one in the stern, and one on each broadside.

The ship was protected by a 100-millimeter (3.9 in) armored belt consisting of Krupp cemented armor, along with an armored deck that was 40 to 80 mm (1.6 to 3.1 in) thick. Her main battery turrets had faces 150 mm (5.9 in) thick and her forward conning tower had an equal amount of armor on its sides.

== Service history ==
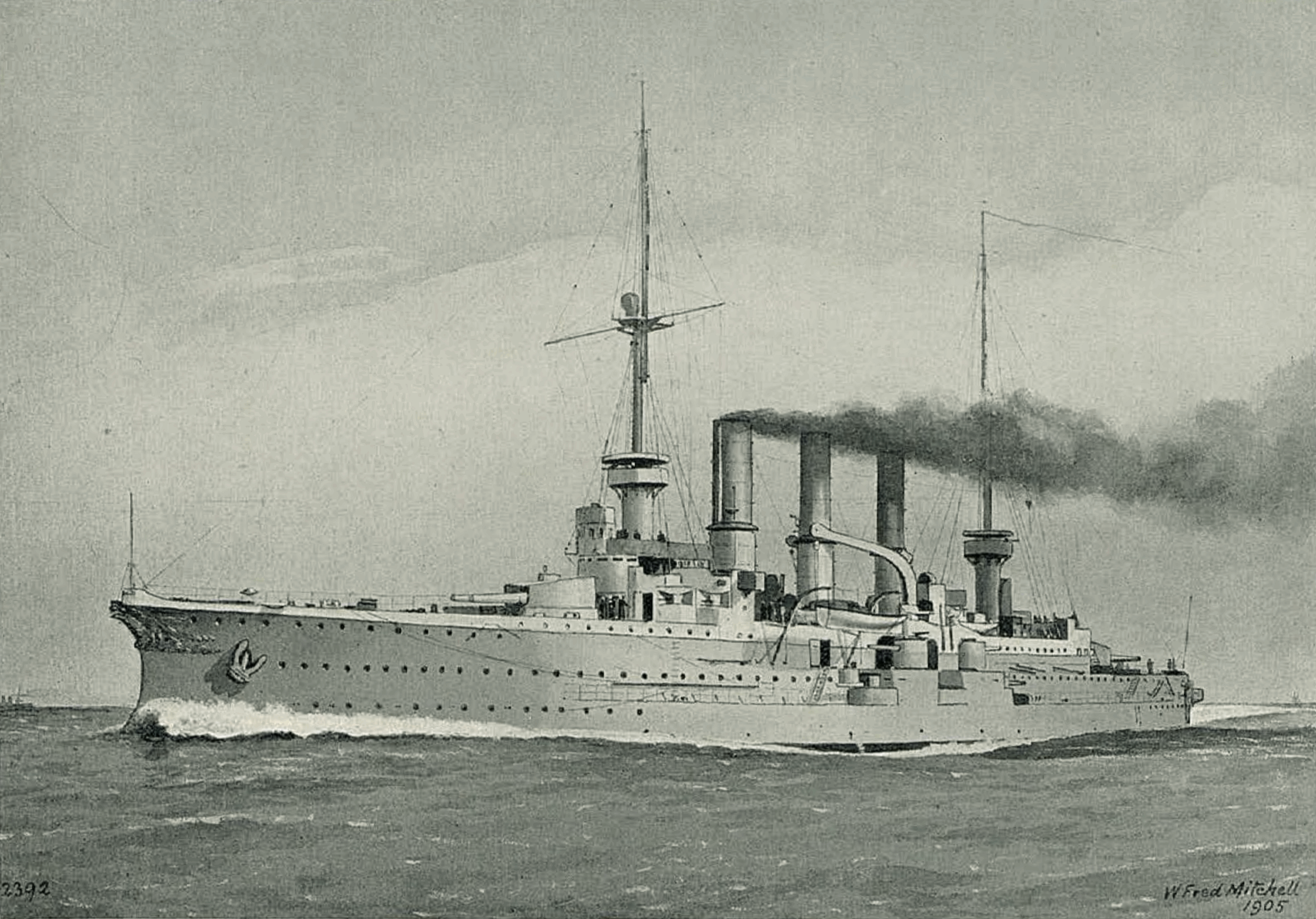
Sketch of Prinz Adalbert, 1905

Prinz Adalbert was ordered under the provisional name "B" and built at the Imperial Dockyard in Kiel under construction number 27. (Note: German warships were ordered under provisional names. For new additions to the fleet, they were given a single letter; for those ships intended to replace older or lost vessels, they were ordered as "Ersatz (name of the ship to be replaced)".) Her keel was laid in April 1900 and she was launched on 22 June 1901. The launching ceremony was attended by Kaiser Wilhelm II, his wife Kaiserin Augusta Victoria, his brother Admiral Prince Heinrich and Wilhelm's son, Prince Adalbert of Prussia. The ceremony of christening the ship was performed by Princess Irene of Prussia, wife of Prince Heinrich, who then delivered a speech. Fitting-out work proceeded slowly, in large part the result of the Imperial Dockyard attempting to build too many ships at once, but the work was eventually completed by 12 January 1904. Prinz Adalbert was commissioned into the Imperial German Navy the same day for sea trials, with Kapitän zur See ('Captain at Sea') Hermann Jacobsen in command; the ship was slated for service as a gunnery training ship. (Note: Fitting out work on the ship lasted for slightly over 30 months. In comparison, Friedrich Carl, her sister ship, was launched on 21 June 1902 and completed by 12 December 1903, a total of 18 months.) Prinz Adalbert reached a maximum speed of 20.56 knots (38.08 km/h; 23.66 mph) on speed tests, though endurance testing had to be stopped early because of a crack in one of the cylinders of her starboard engine. The cylinder was repaired instead of being replaced to allow the ship to enter service as soon as possible, though she was prohibited from deployments abroad. Prinz Adalbert conducted shooting tests to evaluate her armament in February. In March, she was drydocked to remove her central screw, which allowed the ship to conduct experiments to determine if the three-shaft arrangement was actually superior to twin-shaft systems. Using this configuration, she reached only 18.5 knots (34.3 km/h; 21.3 mph). Sea trials were completed by 30 May, after which Prinz Adalbert began her duties as a gunnery training ship.

In September, the ship took part in the annual autumn maneuvers with the rest of the Heimatflotte ('Home Fleet'). A special training unit consisting of reserve ships, training ships like Prinz Adalbert, and a flotilla of torpedo boats was created in early 1905; Prinz Adalbert was the flagship of the unit from 1905 to 1907, flying the flag of Konteradmiral ('Rear Admiral') Hugo Zeye. Prinz Adalbert and the light cruiser Berlin escorted the Kaiser's yacht Hohenzollern to Sweden for a visit to King Oscar II in July 1905. The following month, she joined the light cruisers Undine and Nymphe for training maneuvers off Swinemünde; the exercises were to test the ships against a simulated night attack by torpedo boats. The tests were observed by Konteradmiral Ludwig Schröder, the Inspector of Naval Weapons, aboard Prinz Adalbert. Wilhelm II boarded Prinz Adalbert for the conclusion of the exercises, in which Undine and Nymphe towed a pair of old torpedo boats filled with cork in a simulated night attack on Prinz Adalbert. The ship fired on the torpedo boats with live shells while steaming on an opposing course. Prinz Adalbert did not participate in the 1905 autumn maneuvers, though she was present for the naval review at the end of the exercises on 13 September. In February 1906, the tender Fuchs was assigned to support Prinz Adalbert. From 17 to 28 June, the cruiser served as the flagship of Prince Heinrich, then the commander of the Baltic Sea Naval Station. During this period the ship traveled to Norway to take part in the coronation festivities for King Haakon VII.

The cruiser again took part in the autumn maneuvers in 1907 and 1909. During the latter maneuvers, Prinz Adalbert took part in the Reserve Division, commanded again by Zeye, who had now been promoted to Vizeadmiral ('Vice Admiral'). The ship served as the flagship of the III Scouting Group, under Konteradmiral Johannes Merten, who would go on to command the Ottoman fortifications at the Dardanelles during World War I. In March 1910 and March 1911, Prinz Adalbert conducted gunnery tests in the northern North Sea and visited Tórshavn and Vestmanna in the Faeroe Islands. These included tests with a gyro-stabilized mechanized firing device developed by Petravic, which was effective at improving gun direction in heavy seas and in reducing shell dispersion. She visited Ålesund in Norway in July and August that year. The ship's first period in service came to an end in September, following a large naval review in the Kiel roadstead for Wilhelm II and Archduke Franz Ferdinand, the heir to the Austro-Hungarian throne, which began on 5 September. Prinz Adalbert was then decommissioned in Kiel on the 29th, with the armored cruiser Blücher taking her place as the fleet's gunnery training ship. After a lengthy overhaul, Prinz Adalbert returned to service on 1 November 1912, again with the artillery school. She was based in Sonderburg, where she replaced the armored cruiser Prinz Heinrich. In 1913, Prinz Adalbert was fitted with an experimental, wooden conning tower to test proposals for the planned battleship Württemberg.

=== World War I ===
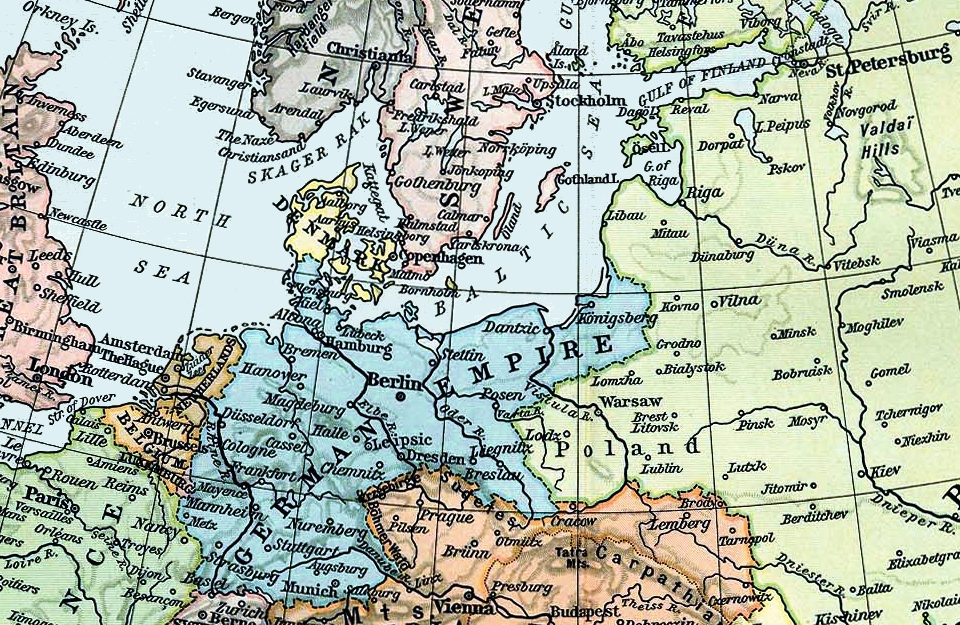
Map of the North and Baltic Seas in 1911

==== 1914 ====
At the outbreak of World War I in July 1914, Prinz Adalbert was brought into front-line service with the fleet, having received the mobilization order on 1 August. Kapitän zur See Andreas Michelsen took command of the ship. She was assigned to the IV Scouting Group, under the command of Konteradmiral Hubert von Rebeur-Paschwitz, though on 12 August, that unit and III Scouting Group exchanged designations. In the meantime, Prinz Adalbert was readied for active service by 4 August; this work included removing the wooden conning tower and loading ammunition. The ship got underway for her first wartime patrol on 17 August in company with the armored cruiser Roon, sailing toward Bornholm. On 26 August, Prinz Adalbert was sent to rescue the light cruiser Magdeburg, which had run aground earlier that day, though she was recalled after the Germans received word that Magdeburg's crew had been forced to scuttle the ship.

Prinz Adalbert was transferred to the North Sea on 7 September and was tasked two days later with protecting the minelaying cruisers Nautilus and Albatross and the auxiliary minelayer Kaiser while they laid a minefield to protect the southern entrance to the Kaiser Wilhelm Canal. The ship was briefly detached to guard the Great Belt after the Germans received false intelligence suggesting that British warships would try to penetrate the Baltic. For the duration of October, Prinz Adalbert remained in port for maintenance to her boilers. She then joined the High Seas Fleet for a sortie into the North Sea on 2–4 November; this operation saw the ships of III Scouting Group screening for the battleships of the High Seas Fleet while the battlecruisers of I Scouting Group conducted a raid on Yarmouth in eastern England. They encountered no enemy forces during the operation. Following her return to port, Prinz Adalbert's crew resumed work on the ship's boilers, which occupied their time for much of the rest of the month.

After her sister ship Friedrich Carl was sunk in November 1914, Prinz Adalbert was detached from III Scouting Group to replace her in the Coastal Defense Division in the Baltic on 29 November. She became the flagship for Admiral Ehler Behring, the commander of the cruiser detachment in the Baltic, on 7 December. On the 15th, she sortied with the light cruisers Augsburg, Lübeck, Amazone, and Thetis and several torpedo boats for a reconnaissance sweep toward Åland; the ships returned to port on 18 December without having engaged Russian forces. Another sweep followed on 27–29 December, this time to cover a sortie by the five Kaiser Friedrich III-class battleships of V Battle Squadron toward Gotland.

==== 1915 ====
On 6 January 1915, Prinz Adalbert, Thetis, Augsburg, Lübeck, and several torpedo boats and U-boats went on a patrol toward Utö, where they discovered a Russian submarine base. The Germans planned to attack the base with the torpedo boats and Thetis, since she had the shallowest draft, but due to a miscommunication, the attack was not carried out. On 22 January, Prinz Adalbert, in company with Augsburg and several torpedo boats, conducted another reconnaissance sweep toward Åland. While on the return voyage, she bombarded Russian positions at Libau. She ran aground off Steinort during the operation, and Augsburg struck a mine off Bornholm. Prinz Adalbert took on some 350 t (340 long tons; 390 short tons) of water in the accident. After being freed from her grounding, the ship was repaired; Michelsen temporarily served as the detachment commander in place of Behring from 13 February to 9 March, when the ship was ready to return to service. Behring returned to Prinz Adalbert on 20 March. In the meantime, the Russians had briefly captured Memel. The Admiralty Staff detached the II Battle Squadron, II Scouting Group, and two flotillas of torpedo boats from the High Seas Fleet to reinforce the forces in the Baltic. The ships began to make diversionary attacks to support the German Army's campaign to retake Memel; Prinz Adalbert supported one such operation, a raid of the II Scouting Group into the Bothnian Sea to attack Russian merchant shipping on 23 March. Prinz Adalbert also bombarded Russian positions as they moved to reinforce Libau. The following day, the ships from the High Seas Fleet were recalled to the North Sea, leaving Behring's cruisers alone once again.

Prinz Adalbert underway

Behring conducted one last operation from 13 to 17 April, with Prinz Adalbert, Thetis, and Lübeck, to support the minelayer Deutschland, which laid a minefield off Dagö. On the 20th, the Admiralstab instituted a reorganization of the Baltic Sea forces, and Behring was replaced by Konteradmiral Albert Hopman. At the same time, Michelsen was promoted to Hopman's chief of staff, with his place as Prinz Adalbert's commanding officer being taken by Kapitän zur See Wilhelm Bunnemann. The ship remained the flagship of the unit, and Hopman made his first cruise aboard the vessel from Kiel to Danzig on 27 April. At this time, Generalfeldmarschall ('General Field Marshal') Paul von Hindenburg, the commander-in-chief of German forces on the Eastern Front, ordered a major assault on Libau. Hopman ordered his forces to support an attempt by the German Army to seize the city. The pre-dreadnoughts of the IV Battle Squadron and the IV Scouting Group were allocated to Hopman's command to provide additional support to the operation. The attack took place on 7 May, and consisted of Prinz Adalbert and the armored cruisers Roon and Prinz Heinrich, the elderly coast defense ship Beowulf, and the cruisers Augsburg, Thetis, and Lübeck. They were escorted by a number of destroyers, torpedo boats, and minesweepers. The bombardment went as planned, though the destroyer V107 struck a mine in Libau's harbor, which blew off her bow and destroyed the ship. German ground forces were successful in their assault and took the city.

On 1 July, the minelayer Albatross, escorted by the cruisers Roon, Augsburg, and Lübeck and seven destroyers, laid a minefield north of Bogskär. While returning to port, the flotilla separated into two sections; Augsburg, Albatross, and three destroyers made for Rixhöft while the remainder of the unit went to Libau. Augsburg and Albatross were intercepted by a powerful Russian squadron commanded by Rear Admiral Bakhirev, consisting of three armored and two light cruisers. Commodore Johannes von Karpf, the flotilla commander, ordered the slower Albatross to steam for neutral Swedish waters and recalled Roon and Lübeck. Albatross was grounded off Gotland and Augsburg escaped, and the Russian squadron briefly engaged Roon before both sides broke contact. Upon being informed of the situation, Hopman sortied with Prinz Adalbert and Prinz Heinrich to support Karpf. While en route, the cruisers encountered the British submarine E9, which torpedoed Prinz Adalbert. The torpedo hit below the conning tower, caused severe damage, and killed ten men. Hopman transferred to the torpedo boat V99 while Michelsen remained aboard Prinz Adalbert to oversee the return to port. The ship took on some 2,000 t (2,000 long tons; 2,200 short tons) of water; her draft increased significantly, which prevented her from being able to put into Danzig, but had to make the journey back to Kiel, which she reached on 4 July, for repairs.

Upon arrival, the ship's coal was removed, along with her forward guns, the turret armor, and anchor chains; the guns themselves were placed on the ship's stern to act as a counterweight. This work lightened Prinz Adalbert enough to be taken into the floating dry dock in Kiel. There, her hull was temporarily patched, since the floating dock was the only dry dock in Kiel capable of servicing the larger dreadnought battleships of the fleet, which meant that it would need to be vacated as quickly as possible. She was refloated on 13 July and thereafter had her forward guns reinstalled. The ship was then dry docked for permanent repairs that lasted until 17 August. She was then moored in Kiel until 7 September for further, minor work. Prinz Adalbert soon got underway again, arriving in Libau on 10 September.

==== Loss ====
Prinz Adalbert's crew spent the next several days making preparations for future combat operations. On 21 September, Prinz Adalbert joined a sortie to the Gulf of Finland with the battleships Braunschweig, Elsass, Mecklenburg, Schwaben, and Zähringen and the light cruiser Bremen. They encountered no Russian forces and returned to port on the 23rd. Another operation followed on 5 October; this was in company with Prinz Heinrich and Bremen, and was to cover a minelayer as it laid a field to the northwest of Östergarn. The ships completed their mission the next day and returned to port without incident. On 19 October 1915, Hopman transferred his flag to Roon and ordered Prinz Adalbert to take up a patrol between Fårö and Dagerort. The ship was steaming some 20 nmi (37 km; 23 mi) west of Libau, en route to her patrol area, in company with a pair of destroyers on 23 October when she was intercepted by the British submarine HMS E8. E8 fired a single torpedo at a range of approximately 1,200 m (1,300 yd); the ship was struck, and the ammunition magazine detonated. The massive explosion destroyed the ship, which sank immediately with the loss of 672 crew, leaving only three survivors. It was the German Baltic forces' greatest single loss of life during the war.

The wreck of Prinz Adalbert was found in 2007 by Swedish divers, who noted the large number of skeletons visible in the vessel. The ship sits at a depth of about 80 m (260 ft). A survey of the ship using side-scan sonar confirmed that the deflagration of the ammunition magazine was responsible for sinking Prinz Adalbert so rapidly. The ship's hull was split in two, roughly amidships, and are widely separated on the sea floor.

== See also ==
- List of ships sunk by submarines by death toll
