= Lūžņa =

Village in Latvia

Lūžņa Livonian: Lūžkilā
- Village
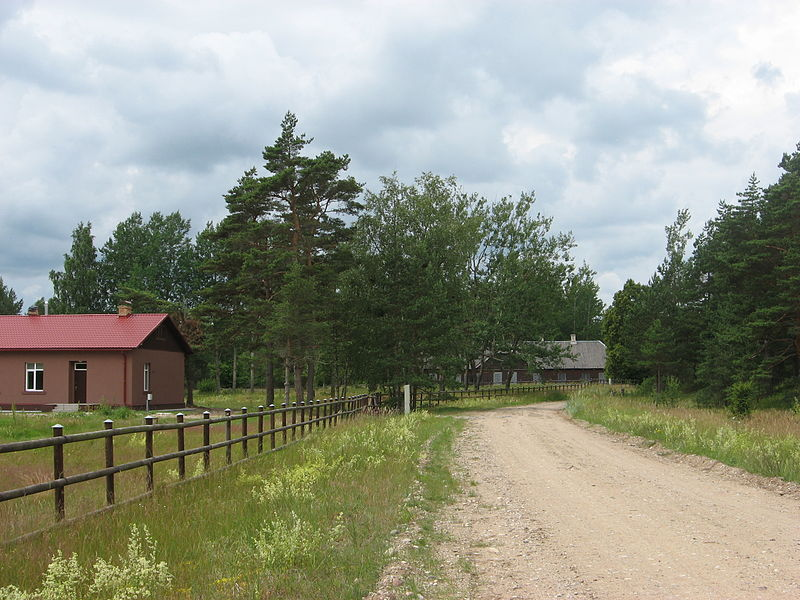

- Location in Latvia
- Coordinates: 57°36′N 21°52′E
- Country: Latvia
- Municipality: Ventspils municipality
- Parish: Tārgale parish
- Elevation: 9.8 ft (3 m)

Population (2015)
  - Total: 3
- Time zone: UTC+2 (EET)
  - Summer (DST): UTC+3 (EEST)

Lūžņa (Livonian: Lūžkilā) is a populated place in Tārgale parish, Ventspils municipality, Latvia, one of the twelve Livonian villages on the Livonian coast. Lūžņa was a long fishing hamlet at the coast of the Baltic Sea about 30 kilometers from Ventspils in the direction of Kolka. During the time of the Latvian Soviet Socialist Republic, a military base was located not far from Lūžņa forcing the inhabitants to move elsewhere. At the beginning of the 21st century, only a few houses and their inhabitants are left along with a fairly wellkept cemetery.

The Livonian people called this settlement Lūžkilā which is probably derived from the river Lūžupe along whose banks people had settled. The settlement long ago had a church but there is no record of how and when it was destroyed.

The settlement of Lūžņa played a great role in the maintenance and development of the Livonian language during the interwar period. The town was often visited by the Finnish professor Lauri Kettunen and his Estonian student Oscar Loorits to continue learning and studying the Livonian language. They also wrote a Livonian language dictionary. The most prolific storytellers in the Livonian language were Janis Belte (1893–1946) and Didriķis Leitis, and the most notable folklorists were Marija Leite and Lote Lindenberga. Janis Belte, a particularly colorful personality in Lūžņa, is considered to be the first known Livonian painter. Eighteen of his works, mostly landscapes, have been compiled. Janis Belte was also a renowned Livonian poet known by his pen name Valkt (Lightning), as well as a folklorist. His daughter Zelma Belte fled to Sweden in 1944 and later immigrated to the Canada, where she was a painter. She painted mostly landscapes, seascapes and flowers, and her work is exhibited at the Livonian Centre Kūolka in Kolka. Livonian Coast was largely depopulated when it was included into Soviet Baltic Military District and Soviet Border Troops severely limited access to the area and access to sea for local fishermen.

== See also ==
- Livonian people
