= Ainaži Lighthouse =

Lighthouse in Latvia

Ainaži Lighthouse Ainažu bāka
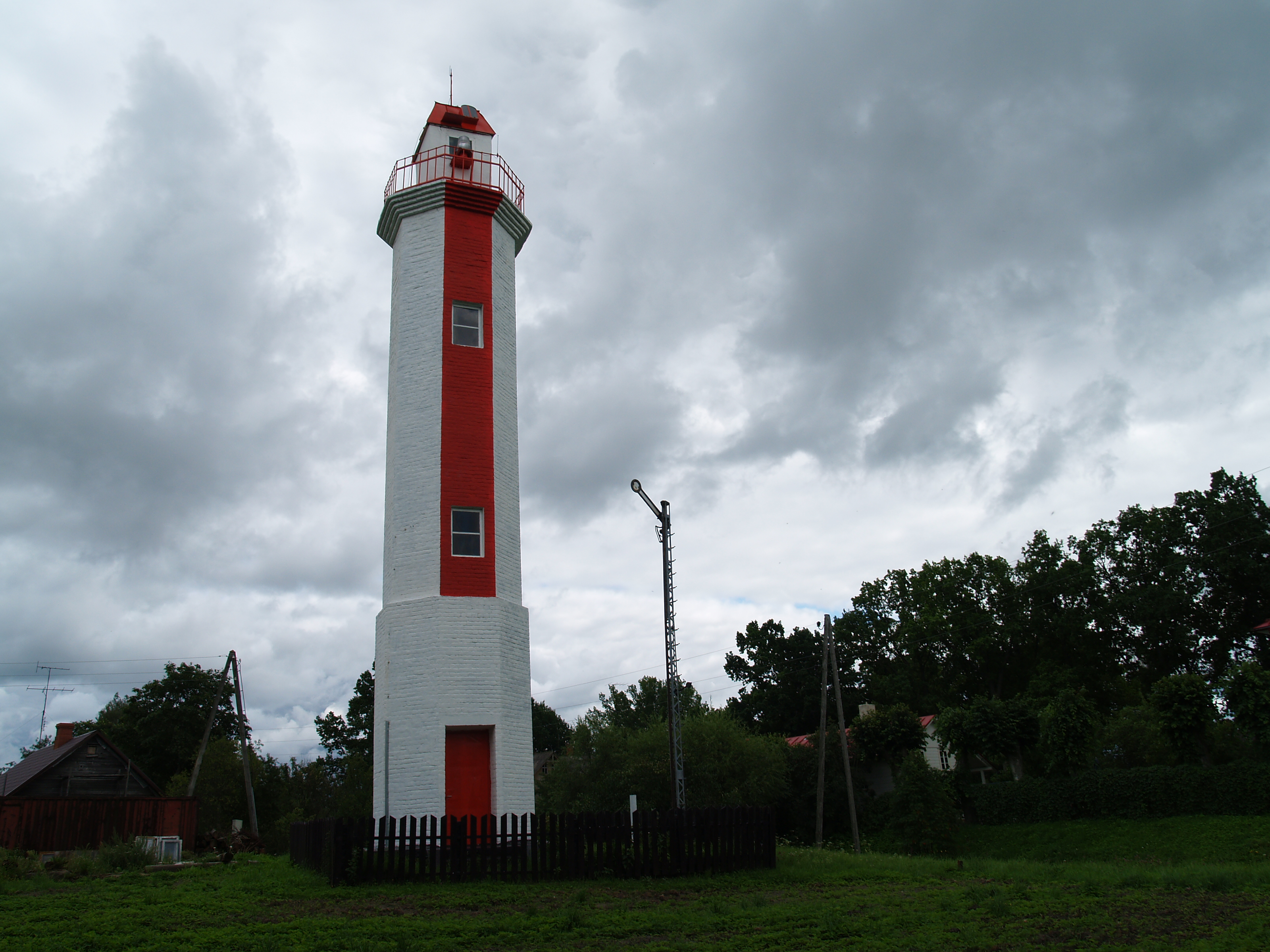
- Ainaži Lighthouse
- Location: Ainaži, Latvia
- Coordinates: 57°51′59.2″N 24°21′37.9″E

Tower
- Constructed: 1930
- Construction: masonry tower
- Height: 59 feet (18 m)
- Shape: octagonal tower with balcony and lantern
- Markings: white tower with an orange vertical stripe, orange roof lantern and rail

Light
- Focal height: 72 feet (22 m)
- Range: 12 nautical miles (22 km; 14 mi)
- Characteristic: Iso W 4s.
- Latvia no.: UZ-001

Ainaži Lighthouse (Latvian: Ainažu bāka) is a lighthouse located in Ainaži on the Bay of Riga - of the Baltic Sea.

== History ==
The Ainahi lighthouse was built in 1930, originally serving as a guide for the nearby Ainaži port and harbour. During World War II, the harbour was bombarded by German bombers; causing the village to lose its processing factory and fishing importance - therefore making the lighthouse insignificant. The village, port and harbour were rebuilt under Soviet control - bringing back the importance of the lighthouse. The lighthouse was reconstructed and furthermore renovated in the 1990s. Currently the lighthouse is a key landmark for the nearby villages.

== See also ==
- List of lighthouses in Latvia
