= Daugavgrīva Lighthouse =

Lighthouse in Latvia

Daugavgrīva Lighthouse Daugavgrīvas bāka
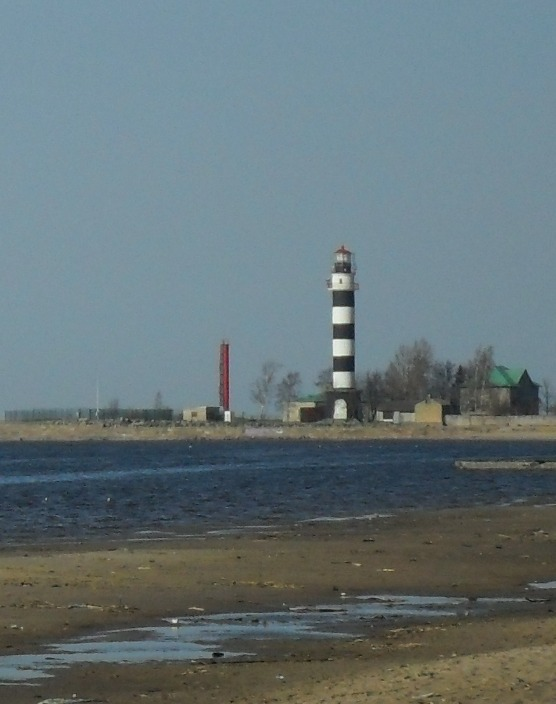
- Location: Daugavgrīva; Latvia
- Coordinates: 57°03′34.6″N 24°01′17.4″E

Tower
- Constructed: 1721 (first); 1819 (second); 1863 (third); 1921 (fourth)
- Construction: concrete tower
- Height: 115 feet (35 m)
- Shape: cylindrical tower with balcony and lantern
- Markings: white with black horizontal bands, red roof lantern

Light
- First lit: 1957 (current)
- Focal height: 121 feet (37 m)
- Range: 18 nautical miles (33 km; 21 mi)
- Characteristic: Fl W 2.5s.
- Latvia no.: UZ-075

Daugavgrīva Lighthouse (Latvian: Daugavgrīvas bāka) is a lighthouse located in Daugavgrīva on the Bay of Riga on the Latvian coast of the Baltic Sea. The lighthouse was built in 1956, located next to Daugava River. Due to the change in the river's course, several lighthouses have been built, destroyed, and rebuilt again over the course of history.

== History ==
The first lighthouse was constructed by Swedes at the turn of the 18th century, right where the present-day mouth of the Daugava River is flowing, into the Baltic Sea. Back then it was a stone layer with a signal fire on the top of the lighthouse. The next lighthouse was a wooden tower on a masonry foundation, which was demolished during the Crimean War in 1854, and instead, cannons were put on the masonry foundation for firing at ships of the British Royal Navy. Then, a fundamental cast-iron lighthouse was constructed in 1863. It stood until World War I, when the lighthouse was blown up by Russian military troops, who retreated to the east from Riga. The successor to the lighthouse was built in 1921 out of reinforced concrete, during Latvia’s period of independence in the Interwar Period. When the German infantry retreated westward towards the end of the Second World War. After World War II a temporary 20-metre lighthouse as built out of a wooden structure, but the lighthouse was devastated after a powerful storm. The current lighthouse was built between 1956 and 1957; with the first light glare shone on February 2, 1957. Currently the lighthouse is open for the public, with the top viewing gallery being accessed by one hundred and fifty spiral steps.

== See also ==
- List of lighthouses in Latvia
