= Ventspils Lighthouse =

Lighthouse in Latvia

Ventspils South Mole Lighthouse Ventspils bāka
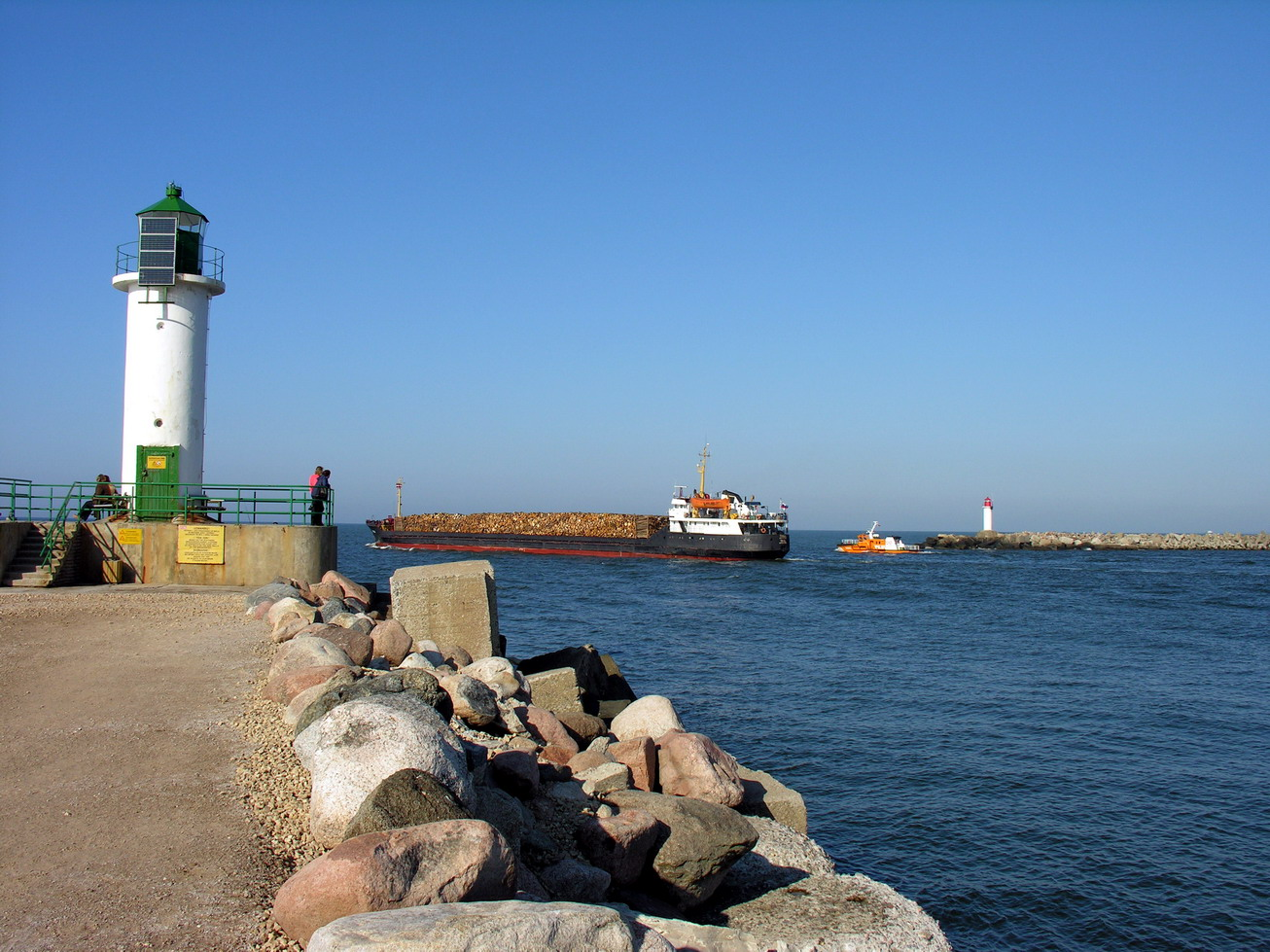
- Location: Ventspils, Latvia
- Coordinates: 57°24′19.4″N 21°31′28.6″E

Tower
- Constructed: 1934 (first)
- Construction: concrete tower
- Automated: yes
- Height: 11 metres (36 ft)
- Shape: cylindrical tower with balcony and lantern
- Markings: white tower and green lantern and reel

Light
- First lit: 1970 (current)
- Focal height: 14 metres (46 ft)
- Range: 3 nautical miles (5.6 km; 3.5 mi)
- Characteristic: Fl (2) G 3s.
- Latvia no.: UZ-597

Ventspils Lighthouse (Latvian: Ventspils bāka) — a lighthouse located in Ventspils on the Latvian coast of the Baltic Sea.

== History ==
The lighthouse is located on the south breakwater of Ventspils port and harbour. Before that, the lighthouse was located on the left bank of the river Venta, which was built in 1897 and destroyed during World War I by the retreating Russian army leaving the town of Ventspils. Both these constructions were not originally lighthouses – although they did have luminous elements, but similarly to factory chimneys and high church spires in the local area, they served as navigational marks for sailors which travelled into the port of Ventspils.

== See also ==
- List of lighthouses in Latvia
