= Jaunciems =

Village in Latvia

Jaunciems Livonian: Ūžkilā
- Village
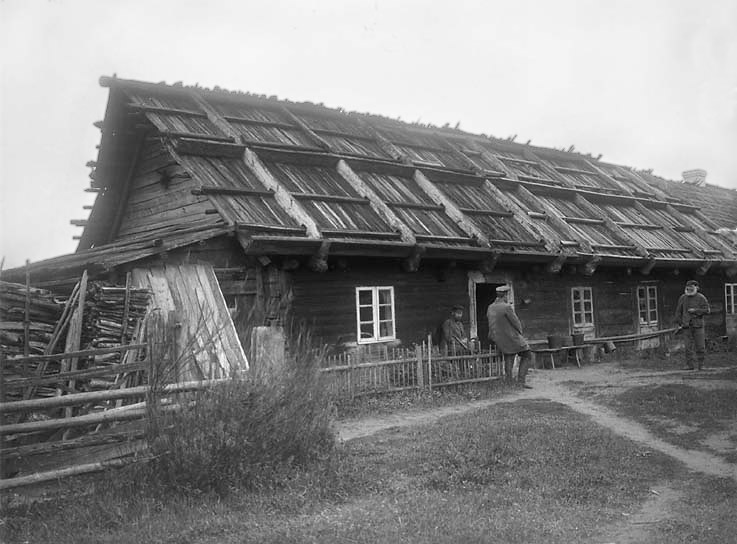
- Livonian homestead in Jaunciems in 1902.

- Location in Latvia
- Coordinates: 57°38.60′N 22°09.40′E
- Country: Latvia
- Municipality: Ventspils Municipality
- Parish: Tārgale Parish
- Elevation: 6.6 ft (2 m)

Population (2005)
  - Total: 4
- Time zone: UTC+2 (EET)
  - Summer (DST): UTC+3 (EEST)

Jaunciems (Livonian: Ūžkilā) is a small village in the Tārgale Parish of Ventspils Municipality in the Courland region of Latvia. It is one of the twelve Livonian villages on Līvõd rānda - the Livonian Coast. Both the Latvian and Livonian names mean "new village".

Most homes in the village are not inhabited year-round after the Livonian Coast was made into a closed border area of the Iron Curtain for fifty years during the Soviet occupation of Latvia.

== See also ==
- Livonian people
