= Mērsrags Lighthouse =

Lighthouse in Latvia

Mērsrags Lighthouse Mērsraga bāka
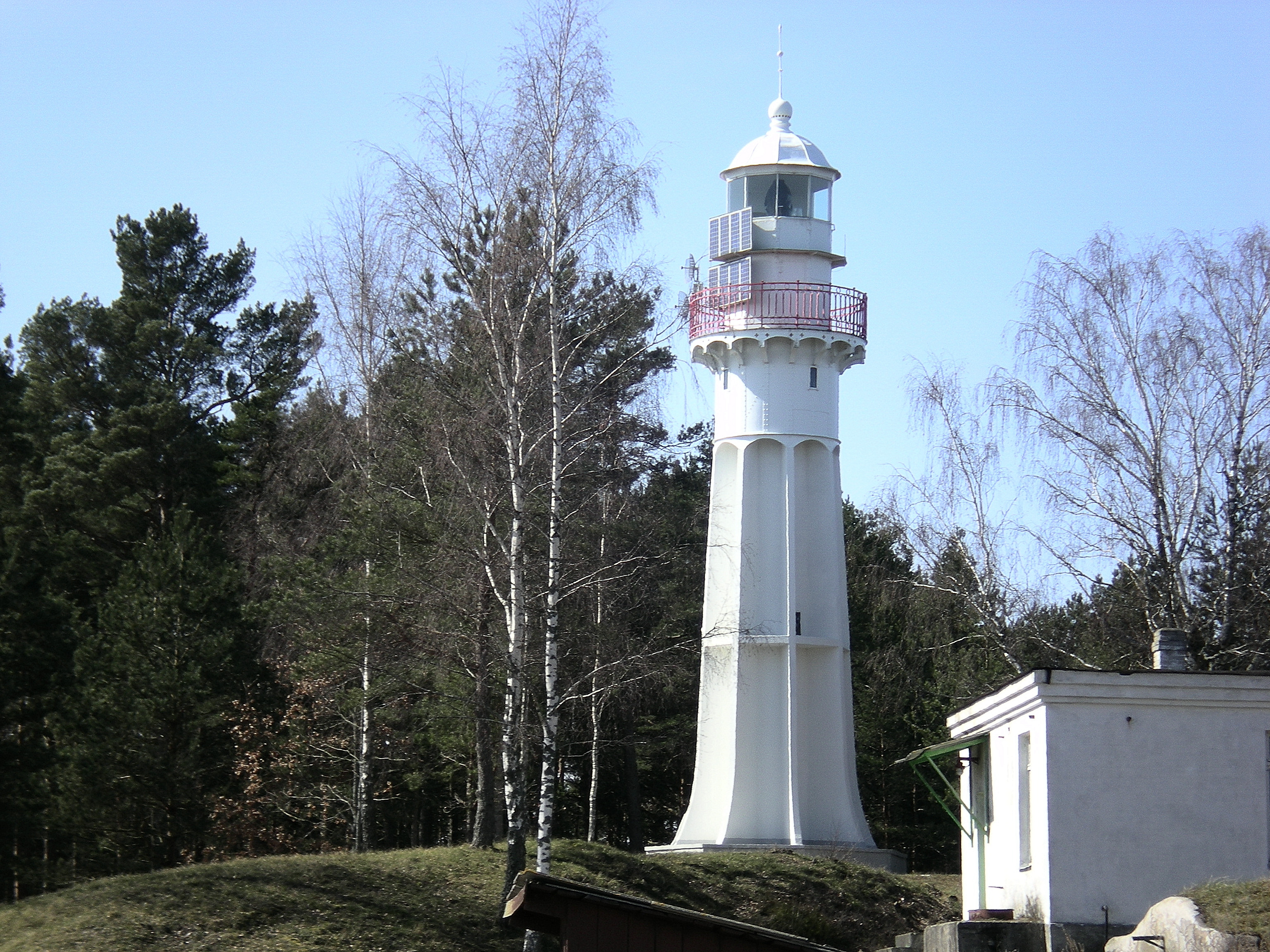
- Mērsrags Lighthouse
- Location: Mērsrags; Latvia
- Coordinates: 57°21′57.2″N 23°7′11.78″E

Tower
- Constructed: 1875
- Construction: cast iron
- Height: 62 feet (19 m)
- Shape: cylindrical hold up by eight buttresses tower with balcony and lantern
- Markings: white tower with red trim
- Heritage: National industrial monument

Light
- First lit: 1922
- Deactivated: 1917
- Focal height: 85 feet (26 m)
- Range: 15 nautical miles (28 km; 17 mi)
- Characteristic: Fl W 5s.
- Latvia no.: UZ-375

Mērsrags Lighthouse (Latvian: Mērsraga bāka) - a lighthouse located on the Bay of Riga, on the Latvian coast of the Baltic Sea. It is located on a headland, stretching as a cape into the Bay of Riga, by a stony shoal.

== History ==
The lighthouse was built in 1875, and is called the Frenchwoman, as the lens, an invention of the French, is used as its signal. The lighthouse was devastated in World War I, when its metal structure was distorted by a fire. The current lighthouse was built in 1922, and is strengthened by eight wrought iron inserts, with the exterior walls sheathed with riveted metal plating.

== See also ==
- List of lighthouses in Latvia
