= Pape Lighthouse =

Lighthouse in Latvia

Pape Lighthouse Papes bāka
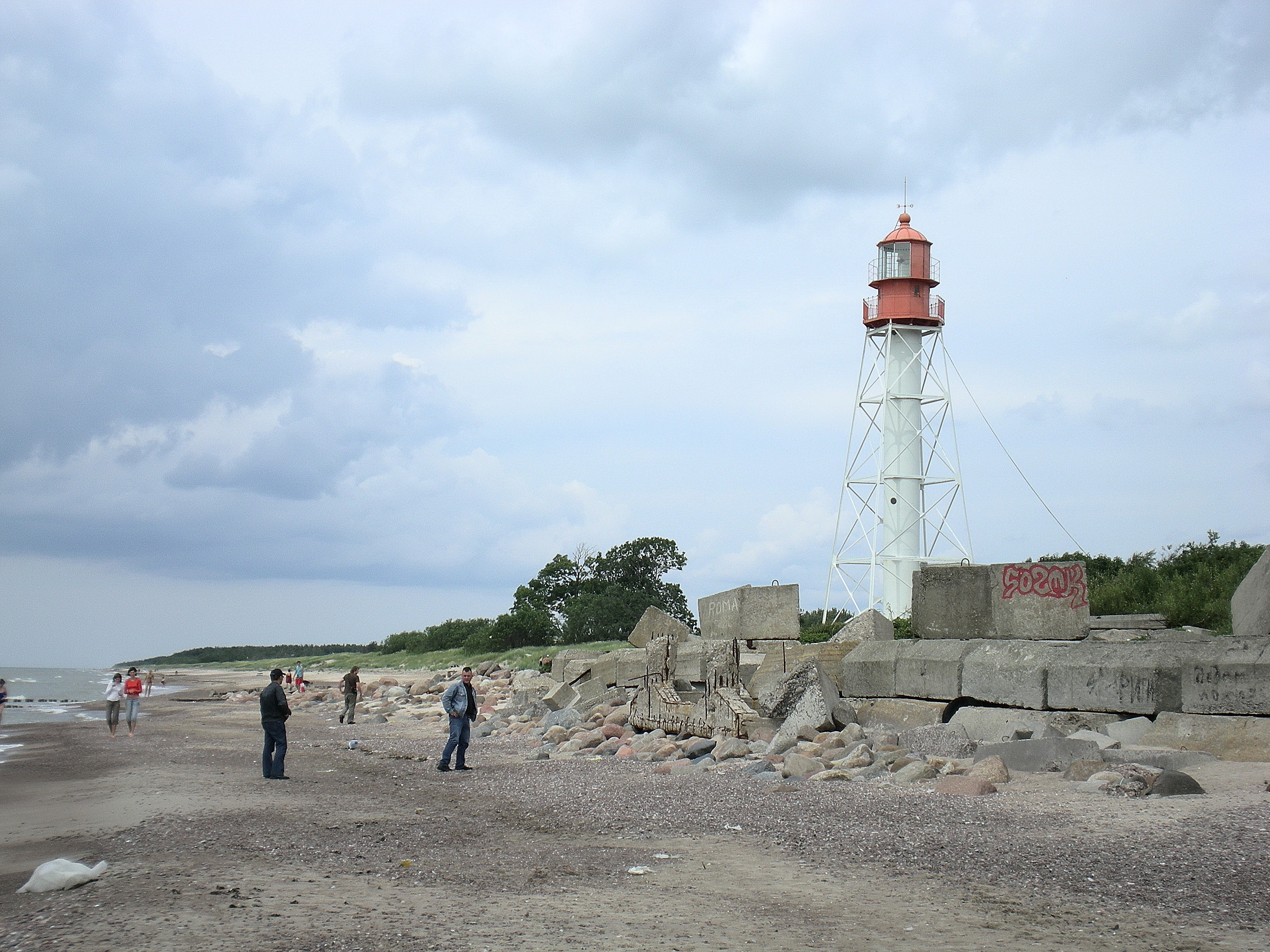
- Pape lighthouse from the beach
- Location: Rucava Municipality; Latvia
- Coordinates: 56°09′17.9″N 21°01′24.0″E

Tower
- Constructed: 1890 (first)
- Construction: steel tower
- Height: 22 metres (72 ft)
- Shape: square pyramidal skeletal tower and central cylinder with double balcony and lantern
- Markings: white tower, red balcony and lantern
- Heritage: National industrial monument

Light
- First lit: 1910 (current)
- Focal height: 26 metres (85 ft)
- Range: 14 nautical miles (26 km; 16 mi)
- Characteristic: white light, 1.5 s on, 2 s off
- Latvia no.: UZ-890

The Pape Lighthouse (Latvian: Papes bāka) is a lighthouse located on the Latvian coast of the Baltic Sea.

== History ==
The lighthouse was built in 1910; in a place of a former lighthouse (which existed since 1887); on the southernmost tip of Latvia's coast to the Baltic Sea. During its early existence (up until the end of World War I), the lighthouse was known as a boundary beacon - as the lighthouse guided ships to the port of Liepāja, on the border of the Russian Empire and Prussia. The current lighthouse is a tube-like cylinder, supported by a riveting iron construction. Currently the lighthouse is closed to visitors, although Emilis Melngailis - a famous Latvian composer, stayed overtnight during his folklore expedition.

== See also ==
- List of lighthouses in Latvia
