= Tārgale Parish =

Parish of Latvia

- parish of Latvia
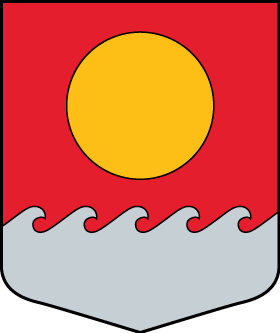
- Coat of arms

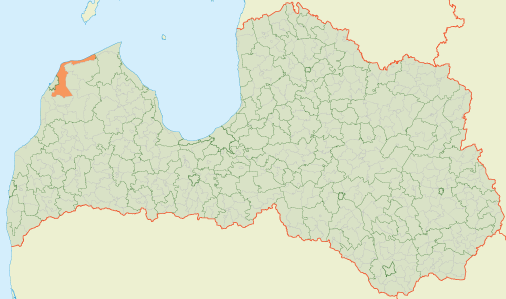
- 57°27′18″N 21°47′24″E
- Country: Latvia

Area
  - Total: 356.55 km^{2} (137.66 sq mi)
  - Land: 356.55 km^{2} (137.66 sq mi)
  - Water: 8.11 km^{2} (3.13 sq mi)

Population (1 January 2025)
  - Total: 1,632
  - Density: 4.577/km^{2} (11.85/sq mi)

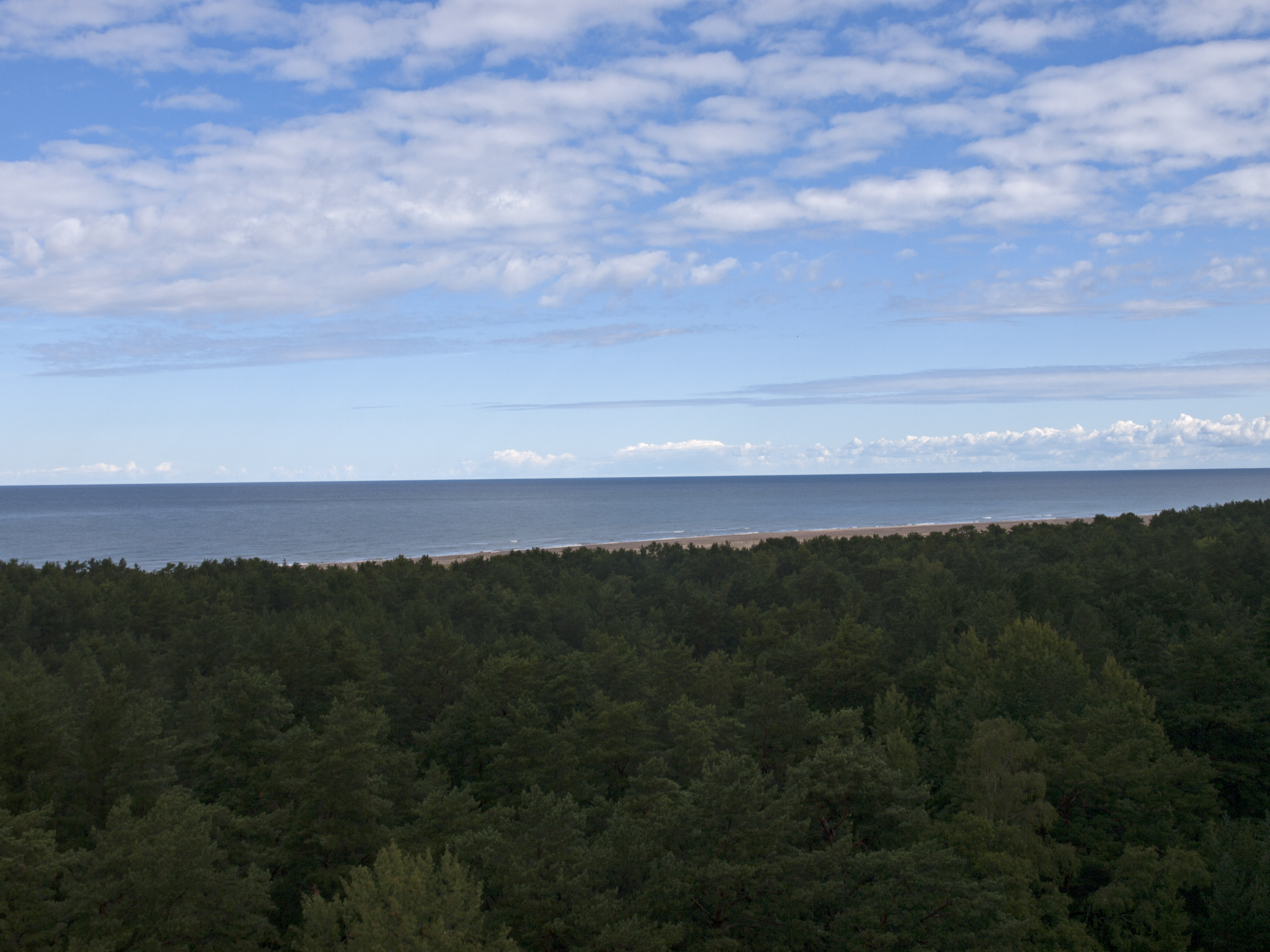
View from Oviši Lighthouse, Tārgale

Tārgale Parish (Latvian: Tārgales pagasts) is an administrative unit of the Ventspils Municipality in the Courland region of Latvia.The parish has a population of 1956 (as of 1/07/2010) and covers an area of 364.19 km^{2}.

== Villages of Tārgale Parish ==
- Akmeņdziras
- Burtnieki
- Būšnieki
- Dokupe
- Dzelzceļnieki
- Elkšķene
- Elkšķenes stacija
- Ēvartciems
- Jaunciems
- Jaunupe
- Kamārce
- Krievlauki
- Kurzeme
- Lielirbe
- Liepene
- Lodes
- Lūžņa
- Miķeļtornis (Miķeļbāka)(Pize)
- Muižnieki
- Oviši
- Packules ciems
- Platene
- Pūrkalni
- Rēdznieku ciems
- Stacija Ventspils-2
- Standzes ciems
- Tārgale

== Notable natives ==
- Alīda Vāne (1899-1969), opera singer
