= Liepāja Lighthouse =

Lighthouse in Liepaja, Latvia

Liepāja Lighthouse Liepājas bāka
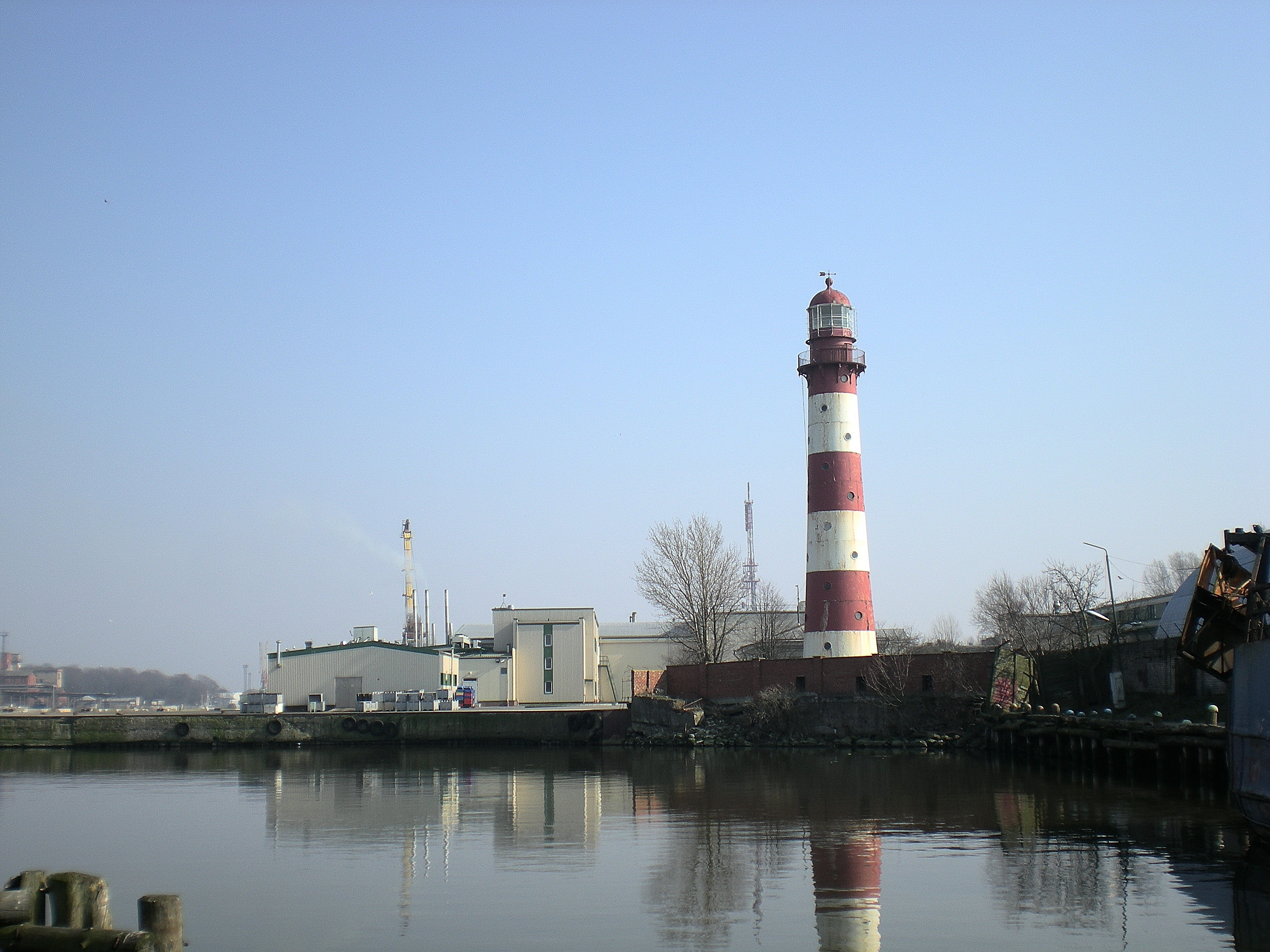
- Location: Liepāja; Latvia
- Coordinates: 56°31′0.58″N 20°59′32.35″E

Tower
- Constructed: 1868
- Construction: cast iron tower
- Height: 33 metres (108 ft)
- Shape: cylindrical tower with balcony and lantern
- Markings: white tower with red horizontal bands, red lantern
- Heritage: National industrial monument

Light
- Focal height: 32 metres (105 ft)
- Range: 16 nautical miles (30 km; 18 mi)
- Characteristic: Iso W 3s.
- Latvia no.: UZ-700

The Liepāja Lighthouse (Latvian: Liepājas bāka) is a lighthouse located in Liepāja on the Latvian coast of the Baltic Sea.

== History ==
The lighthouse is located on the southern bank of the civil harbour of Liepāja, near the entrance. It was built of cast iron from resmelted ship-wreckage in 1868. During its lifetime the lighthouse suffered wartime damage, mainly during World War I, when it was hit by sixteen rounds fired by the German light cruiser SMS Augsburg. Their traces have survived to the present day, as indentations in the lighthouse's external cladding. The new iron sheets covering the lighthouse bear the inscription KOD, meaning they have come from Liepāja, the port and harbour town the lighthouse is located in. Currently the lighthouse's top viewing gallery can be accessed by an internal staircase of one hundred and forty nine steps.

== See also ==
- List of lighthouses in Latvia
