= Oviši Lighthouse =

Lighthouse in Latvia

Oviši Lighthouse Ovišu bāka
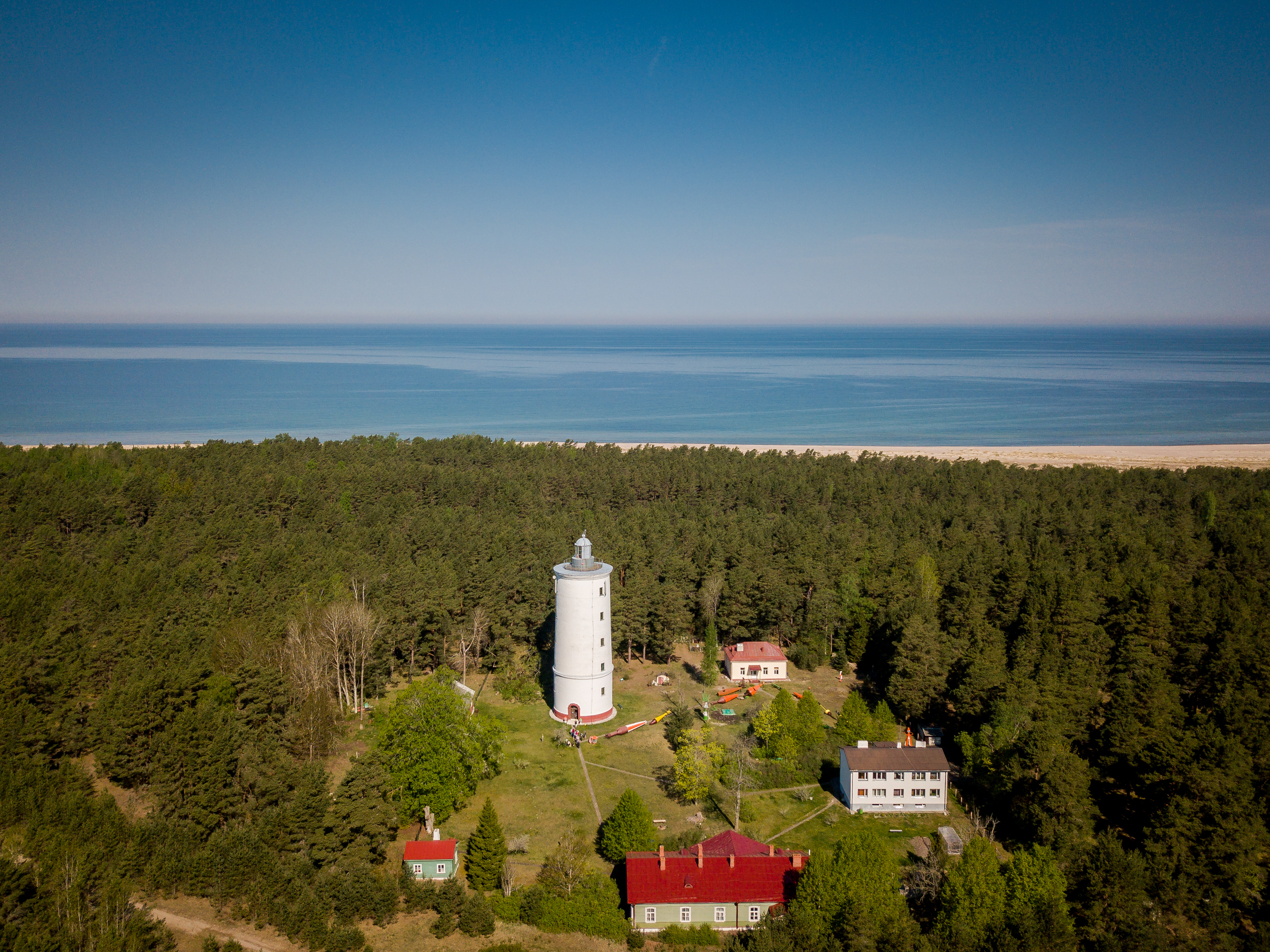
- Oviši Lighthouse
- Location: Oviši, Ventspils Municipality; Latvia
- Coordinates: 57°34′07.7″N 21°42′57.3″E

Tower
- Constructed: 1814
- Construction: stone tower
- Height: 33 metres (108 ft)
- Shape: broad cylindrical tower with balcony and lantern
- Markings: white tower and lantern
- Heritage: National industrial monument

Light
- Focal height: 38 metres (125 ft)
- Range: 15 nautical miles (28 km; 17 mi)
- Characteristic: Fl W 7.5s
- Latvia no.: UZ-475

Oviši Lighthouse (Latvian: Ovišu bāka) is a lighthouse located in Oviši, Latvia near Tārgale on the Courland Peninsula coast of the Baltic Sea.

== History ==
The lighthouse is the oldest functioning lighthouse in Latvia; the village was once a settlement of plunderers which made false signal-fires to rob seamen on stranded ships and steal their goods. The locality, on historic maps, is known as Lusesort or Lyserort. The name originates from the Swedish word lysa, meaning to burn; ort meaning cape. When the lighthouse was built in the nineteenth century, it was used as a navigational aid, with its walls more than half a metre thick. The lighthouse is 33 metres in height, built as a double-cylindrical structure, with a 3.5-metre-high (11 ft) storage building westward of the lighthouse. Currently the base of the lighthouse houses a museum based on the history of Latvia's lighthouses.

== See also ==
- List of lighthouses in Latvia
