= Akmeņrags Lighthouse =

Lighthouse in Latvia

Akmeņrags Lighthouse Akmeņraga bāka
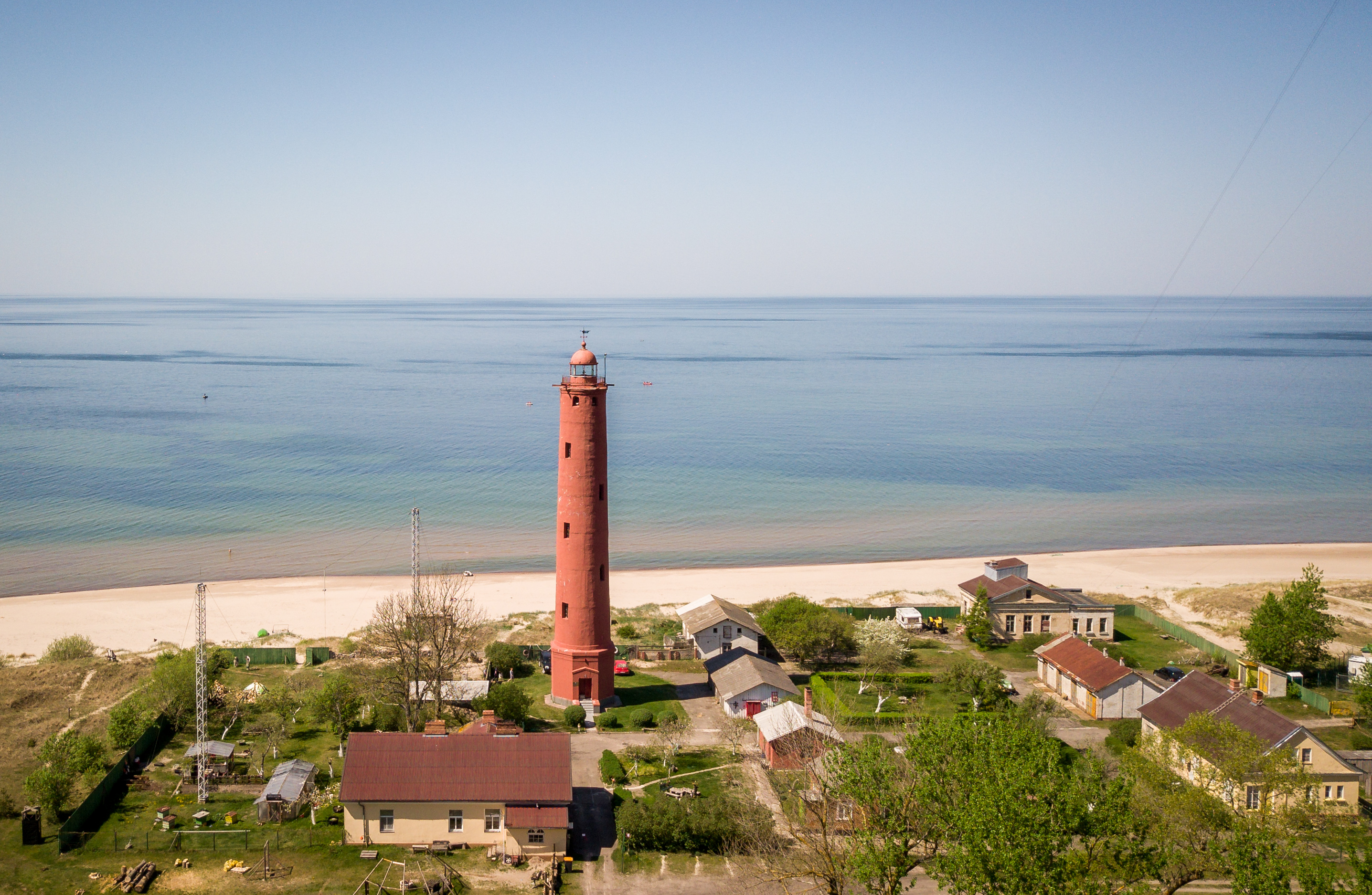
- Location: Saka parish Pāvilosta Municipality; Latvia
- Coordinates: 56°59′54.7″N 21°03′25.7″E

Tower
- Constructed: 1879 (first)
- Construction: limestone tower
- Height: 125 feet (38 m)
- Shape: cylindrical tower with balcony and lantern
- Markings: red tower and lantern
- Heritage: National industrial monument

Light
- First lit: 1921 (current)
- Focal height: 125 feet (38 m)
- Range: 18 nautical miles (33 km; 21 mi)
- Characteristic: Fl(2) W 7.5s
- Latvia no.: UZ-680

Akmeņrags Lighthouse (Latvian: Akmeņraga bāka) is a lighthouse on the Latvian coast of the Baltic Sea, located to the south of the resort town of Pāvilosta. The lighthouse of Akmeņrags is a key navigation point, in one of the most dangerous spots on the Baltic Sea to navigate by - this is due to several factors: the lighthouse is located by a stony sand bank, which extends by a distance of 2 nautical miles (about 3,7 kilometres) to the north-west of the lighthouse; another point of danger is the depth of the sea - which is on average 2 metres in the lighthouse's vicinity. The location of the lighthouse has remained the same over the decade; however the coast has receded.

== History ==
The lighthouse has seen several shipwrecks during its existence - a notable one being the shipwreck of September 1923; when a famous Latvian steamer Saratow, which housed the Latvian Provisional Government for a period in 1919, struck the ground. The current tower was constructed in 1921, as the previous lighthouse was destroyed during World War I. Currently the lighthouse is open to the public, with its one hundred and twenty six steps reaching up to the viewing gallery.

== See also ==
- List of lighthouses in Latvia
