= Tārgale =

Village in Latvia

- Village
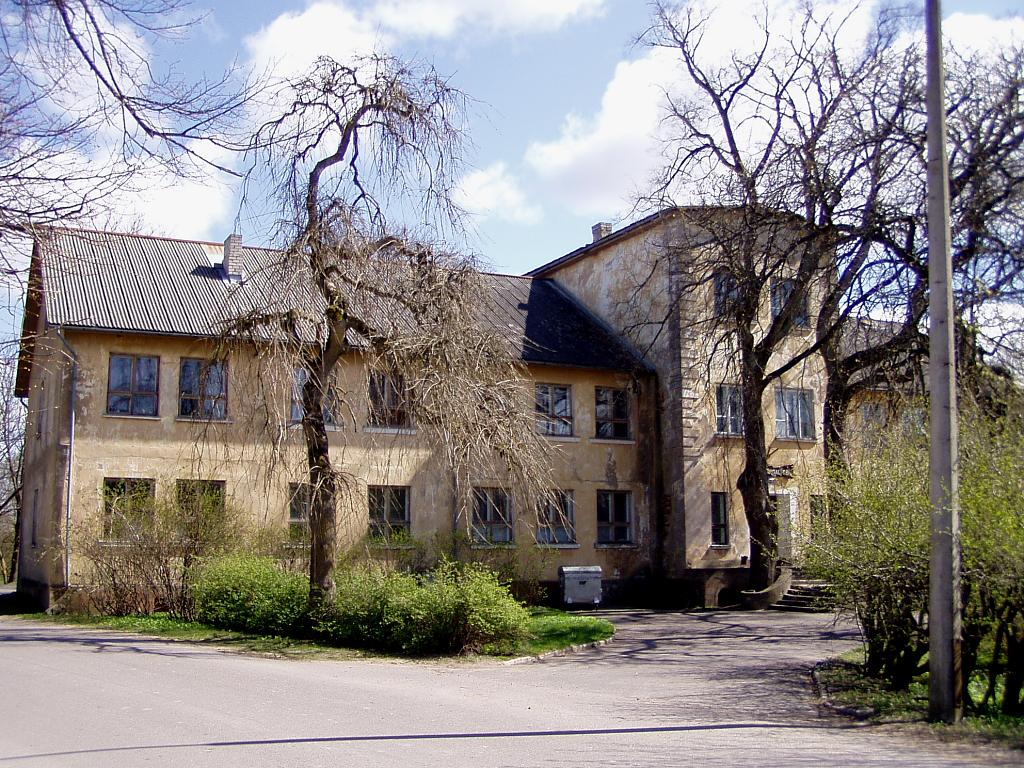
- Tārgale manor palace

- Location within Latvia
- Coordinates: 57°19′58″N 21°38′06″E
- Country: Latvia
- Municipality: Ventspils municipality
- Parish: Tārgale parish
- First mentioned: 1230
- Elevation: 10 m (33 ft)

Population (2005)
  - Total: 681
- Postal code: LV-3621 Tārgale

Tārgale is a village at the centre of the Tārgale Parish of Ventspils Municipality in the Courland region of Latvia. It is situated by the P122 road 13 km from the county council in Ventspils and 185 km from Riga.

The name of Tārgale is first mentioned in documents in the year 1230. The village has developed around the center of the Tārgale manor (Tergeln). In the palace of the manor a school was established (1942–1985), later - a kolkhoz office. In Targale there is the parish administration, a primary school, and a post office.
