= Miķeļtornis =

Village in Latvia

Miķeļtornis Livonian: Pizā
- Village
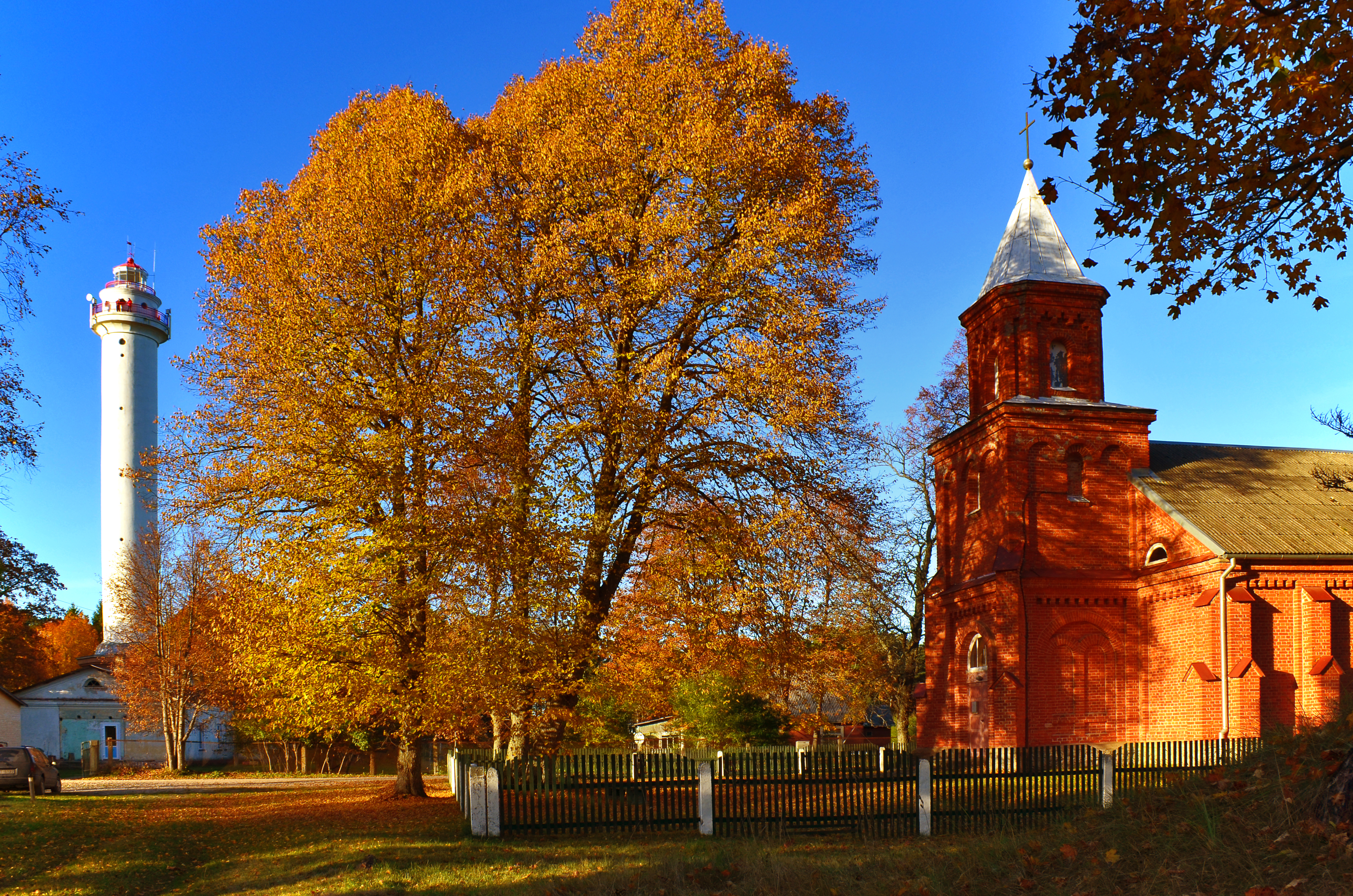
- Lighthouse and church in Miķeļtornis

- Location in Latvia
- Coordinates: 57°36′00″N 21°58′00″E
- Country: Latvia
- Municipality: Ventspils municipality
- Parish: Tārgale parish
- Elevation: 13 ft (4 m)

Population (2015)
  - Total: 30
- Time zone: UTC+2 (EET)
  - Summer (DST): UTC+3 (EEST)

Miķeļtornis (Livonian: Pizā) is a populated place in the Tārgale Parish of Ventspils Municipality in the Courland region of Latvia. It is one of the twelve Livonian villages on the Livonian Coast.

== Miķeļbāka ==
Lighthouse "Miķeļbāka" established in 1884 is located nearby. The present 184-foot-high (56 m) lighthouse tower was built in 1957. It is the highest lighthouse in the three Baltic states, and is located about 7.5 miles west of Lielirbe at 57°36′N, 21°53′E.

== See also ==
- Livonian people
