= Albert Speer (disambiguation) =

Albert Speer (1905–1981) was a German architect and Nazi minister

Albert Speer may also refer to:

- Albert Speer (play), a 2000 play by David Edgar
- Albert Friedrich Speer (1863–1947), German architect, father of Albert Speer
- Albert Speer (born 1934) (1934–2017), German architect and urban planner, son of Albert Speer

== See also ==
- Albert Spear (1852–1929), judge and politician in Maine
