= Speer und Er =

2005 German TV miniseries

- Written by: Heinrich Breloer, Horst Königstein
- Directed by: Heinrich Breloer
- Starring: Sebastian Koch
- Country of origin: Germany
- Original language: German

Production
- Running time: 270 minutes

Original release
- Release: 9 May – 12 May 2005

Speer und Er (literally "Speer and He", released as Speer and Hitler: The Devil's Architect) is a three-part German docudrama starring Sebastian Koch as Albert Speer and Tobias Moretti as Adolf Hitler. It mixes historical film material with reconstructions, as well as interviews with three of Speer's children, Albert Speer Jr., Arnold Speer and Hilde Schramm.

The appended documentary confronts several interviewees including Wolf Jobst Siedler, Joachim Fest and Speer relatives with evidence that Speer knew in detail that some Nazi concentration camps functioned as killing factories, something he consistently maintained he could have found out but never actually knew.

== Structure ==
- Part 1: Germania – The Delusion
- Part 2: Nuremberg – The Trial
- Part 3: Spandau – The Punishment
- Documentary

== Cast ==
The following list gives the name of each actor followed by the real historical figure played. It does not include the many people interviewed as themselves.

- Sebastian Koch: Albert Speer
- Tobias Moretti: Adolf Hitler
- Dagmar Manzel: Gretel Speer
- Eva Hassmann: Eva Braun
- Peter Rühring: Karl Dönitz
- André Hennicke: Rudolf Hess
- Michael Gwisdek: Erich Raeder
- Elert Bode: Konstantin von Neurath
- Andreas Conrad: Hans Frank
- Susanne Schäfer: Annemarie Kempf
- Axel Milberg: Rudolf Wolters
- Erika Marozsan: Marion Riesser
- Wilfried Hochholdinger: Dr. Paul Joseph Goebbels
- Hannes Jaenicke: Major Airey Neave
- August Zirner: Dr. Gustave M. Gilbert
- Markus Boysen: Baldur von Schirach
- Milena Dreißig: Hilde Schramm
- Peter Schneider: Albert Speer Jr.
- Goetz Argus: Gerhard Degenkolb
- Joachim Bissmeier: Dr. Hans Flächsner
- Rose-Lise Bonin: Margarete Speer
- Gottfried Breitfuss: Martin Bormann
- Götz Burger: Walther Funk
- Karlheinz Ciba: Gauleiter des Rheinlands
- Edmund Dehn: Robert H. Jackson
- Franz Dinda: Arnold Speer
- Sky du Mont: John Kenneth Galbraith
- Conrad F. Geier: Dr. Fritz Todt
- Heinz Grunschel: Heinrich Hoffmann
- Hannes Hellmann: Hermann Göring
- Alfred Herms: Julius Schulte-Frohlinde
- Heinz Kloss: Friedrich Hetzelt
- Michael Maertens: Dr. Karl Brandt
- Florian Martens: Heinrich Himmler
- Hubert Mulzer: Walter Model
- Christian Nickel: Ernst Speer
- Michael Pas: Paul Ludwig Troost
- Patrick Elias: Richard Sonnenfeldt
- Oliver Stern: Fritz Sauckel
- Sven Walser: Hans Kammler
- Franz Xaver Zach: Friedrich Tamms
- Murad Yazigarov: Roman Rudenko
- Peter Bishop: English Director Spandau Prison

== Sources ==
- Fest, Joachim; Dring, Alexandra (2002). Speer: The Final Verdict. Translated by Osers, Ewald. Harcourt. ISBN 0-15-100556-7.
- Sereny, Gitta (1995). Albert Speer: His Battle With Truth. Knopf. ISBN 0-394-52915-4. "Speer's life during the Third Reich can only be understood in the context of his strange relationship with Hitler... What is to be learned about these two men should make us ponder the nature of love and the perils of emotion."
