= Albert Speer =

German architect (1905–1981)

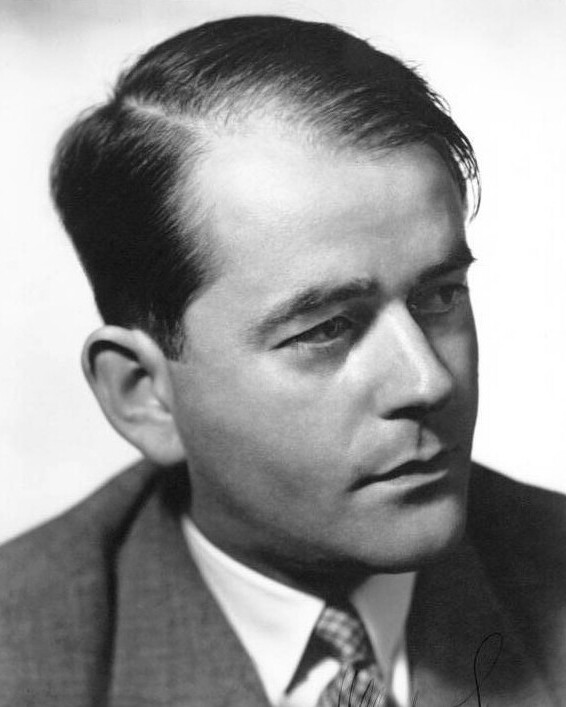
- Speer in 1933

Reich Minister of Armaments and War Production (Note: Until 2 September 1943, the position's official name was Reich Minister of Armaments and Munitions.)
- In office 8 February 1942 – 30 April 1945
- Führer: Adolf Hitler
- Preceded by: Fritz Todt (as Minister of Armaments and Munitions)
- Succeeded by: Karl Saur (as Minister of Munitions)

Reich Minister of Industry and Production
- In office 5 May 1945 – 23 May 1945
- Head of state: Karl Dönitz
- Head of government: Lutz Graf Schwerin von Krosigk
- Preceded by: Walther Funk (as Minister of Economics)
- Succeeded by: Position abolished

Inspector General of German Roadways
- In office 8 February 1942 – 23 May 1945
- Preceded by: Fritz Todt
- Succeeded by: Position abolished

Inspector General for Water and Energy
- In office 8 February 1942 – 23 May 1945
- Preceded by: Fritz Todt
- Succeeded by: Position abolished

Head of Organization Todt
- In office 8 February 1942 – 14 April 1944
- Preceded by: Fritz Todt
- Succeeded by: Franz Xaver Dorsch

General Building Inspector for the Reich Capital
- In office 30 January 1937 – 23 May 1945
- Preceded by: Position created
- Succeeded by: Position abolished

Personal details
- Born: Berthold Konrad Hermann Albert Speer; 19 March 1905 Mannheim, Germany
- Died: 1 September 1981 (aged 76) London, England
- Party: Nazi Party (1931–1945)
- Spouse: Margarete (Margret) Weber (m. 1928)
- Children: 6, including Albert, Hilde, Margarete
- Parents: Albert Friedrich Speer (father); Luise Máthilde Wilhelmine Hommel (mother)
- Education: Technische Universität Berlin; Technical University of Munich; University of Karlsruhe
- Profession: Architect, government official, author
- Cabinet: Hitler cabinet Schwerin von Krosigk cabinet
- Criminal information
- Convictions: War crimes Crimes against humanity
- Trial: Nuremberg trials
- Penalty: 20 years' imprisonment

Details
- Targets: Millions of slave laborers; Soviet prisoners of war and others
- Imprisoned at: Spandau Prison

Berthold Konrad Hermann Albert Speer (/ʃpɛər/; German: [ˈʃpeːɐ̯]; 19 March 1905 – 1 September 1981) was a German architect who served as Minister of Armaments and War Production in Nazi Germany during most of World War II. A close friend and ally of Adolf Hitler, he was convicted at the Nuremberg trials and served 20 years in prison.

An architect by training, Speer joined the Nazi Party in 1931. His architectural skills made him increasingly prominent within the Party, and he became a member of Hitler's inner circle. Hitler commissioned him to design and construct structures, including the Reich Chancellery and the Nazi Party rally grounds in Nuremberg. In 1937, Hitler appointed Speer as General Building Inspector for Berlin. In this capacity he was responsible for the Central Department for Resettlement that evicted Jewish tenants from their homes in Berlin. In February 1942, Speer was appointed as Reich Minister of Armaments and War Production. Using misleading statistics, he promoted himself as having performed an armaments miracle that was widely credited with keeping Germany in the war. In 1944, Speer established a task force to increase production of fighter aircraft. It became instrumental in exploiting slave labor for the benefit of the German war effort.

After the war, Speer was among the 24 major war criminal defendants charged by the International Military Tribunal for Nazi atrocities. He was found guilty of war crimes and crimes against humanity, principally for the use of slave labor, narrowly avoiding a death sentence. Having served his full term, Speer was released in 1966. He used his writings from the time of imprisonment as the basis for two autobiographical books, Inside the Third Reich and Spandau: The Secret Diaries. Speer's books were a success; the public was fascinated by the inside view of the Third Reich he provided. He died of a stroke in 1981.

Through his autobiographies and interviews, Speer carefully constructed an image of himself as a man who deeply regretted having failed to discover the crimes of the Third Reich. He continued to deny explicit knowledge of, and responsibility for, the Holocaust. This image dominated his historiography in the decades following the war, giving rise to the "Speer myth": the perception of him as an apolitical technocrat responsible for revolutionizing the German war machine. The myth began to fall apart in the 1980s, when the armaments miracle was attributed to Nazi propaganda. Twenty-five years after Speer's death, Adam Tooze wrote in The Wages of Destruction that the idea that Speer was an apolitical technocrat was "absurd". Martin Kitchen, writing in Speer: Hitler's Architect, stated that much of the increase in Germany's arms production was actually due to systems instituted by Speer's predecessor (Fritz Todt) and that Speer was intimately aware of and involved in the Final Solution, evidence of which has been conclusively shown in the decades following the Nuremberg trials.

== Early years and personal life ==
Speer was born in Mannheim, into an upper-middle-class family. He was the second of three sons of Luise Máthilde Wilhelmine (Hommel) and Albert Friedrich Speer. In 1918, the family leased their Mannheim residence and moved to a home they had in Heidelberg. Henry T. King, deputy prosecutor at the Nuremberg trials who later wrote a book about Speer said, "Love and warmth were lacking in the household of Speer's youth." His brothers, Ernst and Hermann, bullied him throughout his childhood. Speer was active in sports, taking up skiing and mountaineering. He followed in the footsteps of his father and grandfather and studied architecture.

Speer began his architectural studies at the University of Karlsruhe instead of a more highly acclaimed institution because the hyperinflation crisis of 1923 limited his parents' income. In 1924, when the crisis had abated, he transferred to the "much more reputable" Technische Hochschule München (now Technical University of Munich). In 1925, he transferred again, this time to the Technische Hochschule Berlin-Charlottenburg (now Technische Universität Berlin) where he studied under Heinrich Tessenow, whom Speer greatly admired. After passing his exams in 1927, Speer became Tessenow's assistant, a high honor for a man of 22. As such, Speer taught some of his classes while continuing his own postgraduate studies. In Munich, Speer began a close friendship, ultimately spanning over 50 years, with Rudolf Wolters, who also studied under Tessenow.

In mid-1922, Speer began courting Margarete (Margret) Weber (1905–1987), the daughter of a successful craftsman who employed 50 workers. The relationship was frowned upon by Speer's class-conscious mother, who felt the Webers were socially inferior. Despite this opposition, the two married in Berlin on 28 August 1928; seven years elapsed before Margarete was invited to stay at her in-laws' home. The couple would have six children together, but Albert Speer grew increasingly distant from his family after 1933. He remained so even after his release from imprisonment in 1966, despite their efforts to forge closer bonds.

== Party architect and government functionary ==
=== Joining the Nazis (1931–1934) ===
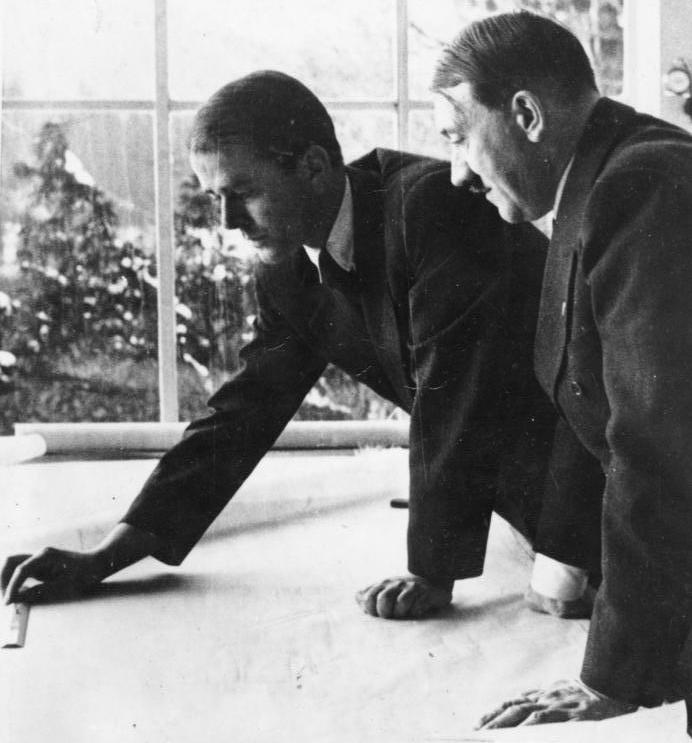
Speer shows Hitler a project at Obersalzberg.

In January 1931, Speer applied for Nazi Party membership, and on 1 March 1931, he became member number 474,481. (Note: On 31 January 1931, he also joined the Motor Unit of the SA being a member until autumn 1932. On 20 July 1942, Speer was enrolled by order of Heinrich Himmler as a SS Man/member of Personal Staff Reichsführer-SS [SS Number 46104]. However his application was never completed, becoming nolle prosequi.) The same year, with stipends shrinking amid the Depression, Speer surrendered his position as Tessenow's assistant and moved to Mannheim, hoping to make a living as an architect. After he failed to do so, his father gave him a part-time job as manager of his properties. In July 1932, the Speers visited Berlin to help out the Party before the Reichstag elections. While they were there his friend, Nazi Party official Karl Hanke recommended the young architect to Joseph Goebbels to help renovate the Party's Berlin headquarters. When the commission was completed, Speer returned to Mannheim and remained there as Hitler took office in January 1933.

The organizers of the 1933 Nuremberg Rally asked Speer to submit designs for the rally, bringing him into contact with Hitler for the first time. Neither the organizers nor Rudolf Hess were willing to decide whether to approve the plans, and Hess sent Speer to Hitler's Munich apartment to seek his approval. This work won Speer his first national post, as Nazi Party "Commissioner for the Artistic and Technical Presentation of Party Rallies and Demonstrations".

Shortly after Hitler came into power, he began to make plans to rebuild the chancellery. At the end of 1933, he contracted Paul Troost to renovate the entire building. Hitler appointed Speer, whose work for Goebbels had impressed him, to manage the building site for Troost. As Chancellor, Hitler had a residence in the building and came by every day to be briefed by Speer and the building supervisor on the progress of the renovations. After one of these briefings, Hitler invited Speer to lunch, to the architect's great excitement. Speer quickly became part of Hitler's inner circle; he was expected to call on him in the morning for a walk or chat, to provide consultation on architectural matters, and to discuss Hitler's ideas. Most days he was invited to dinner.

In the English version of his memoirs, Speer says that his political commitment merely consisted of paying his "monthly dues". He assumed his German readers would not be so gullible and told them the Nazi Party offered a "new mission". He was more forthright in an interview with William Hamsher in which he said he joined the party in order to save "Germany from Communism". After the war, he claimed to have had little interest in politics at all and had joined almost by chance. Like many of those in power in the Third Reich, he was not an ideologue, "nor was he anything more than an instinctive anti-Semite." Historian Magnus Brechtken, discussing Speer, said he did not give anti-Jewish public speeches and that his anti-Semitism can best be understood through his actions—which were anti-Semitic. Brechtken added that, throughout Speer's life, his central motives were to gain power, rule, and acquire wealth.

=== Nazi architect (1934–1937) ===
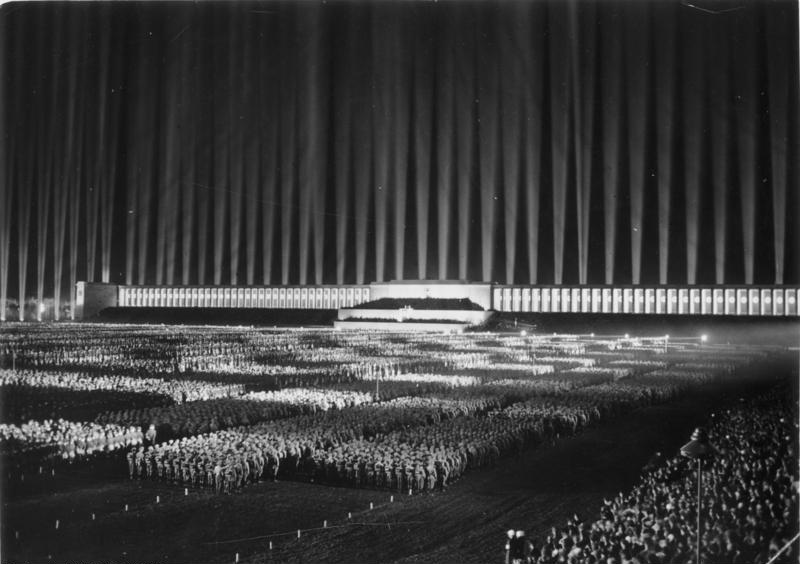
The Cathedral of Light above the Zeppelintribune

When Troost died on 21 January 1934, Speer effectively replaced him as the Party's chief architect. Hitler appointed Speer as head of the Chief Office for Construction, which placed him nominally on Hess' staff.

One of Speer's first commissions after Troost's death was the Zeppelinfeld stadium in Nuremberg. It was used for Nazi propaganda rallies and can be seen in Leni Riefenstahl's propaganda film Triumph of the Will. The building was able to hold 340,000 people. Speer insisted that as many events as possible be held at night, both to give greater prominence to his lighting effects and to hide the overweight Nazis. Nuremberg was the site of many official Nazi buildings. Many more buildings were planned. If built, the German Stadium in Nuremberg would have accommodated 400,000 spectators. Speer modified Werner March's design for the Olympic Stadium being built for the 1936 Summer Olympics. He added a stone exterior that pleased Hitler. Speer designed the German Pavilion for the 1937 international exposition in Paris.

=== Berlin's General Building Inspector (1937–1942) ===
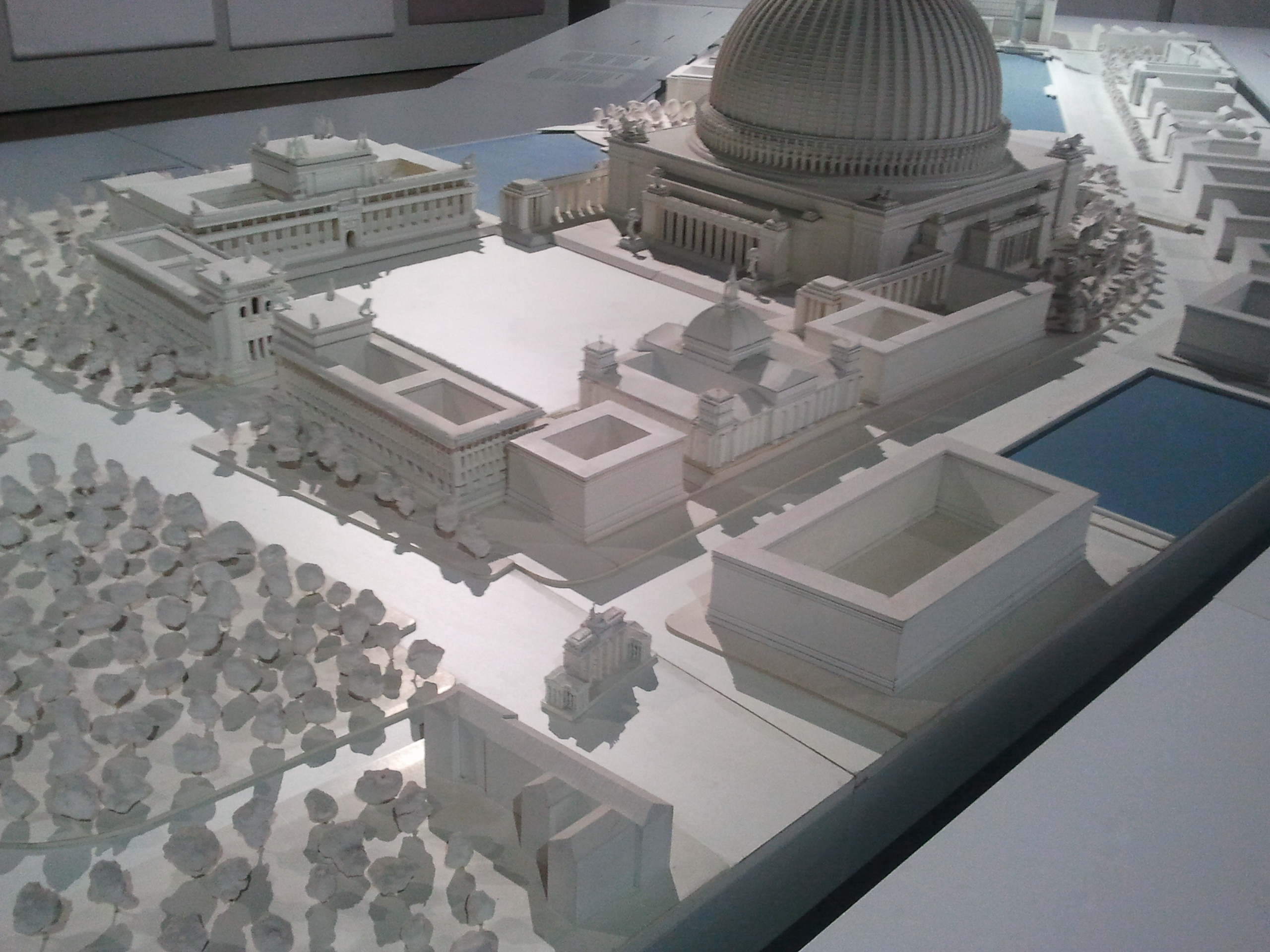
Model of the Große Halle (also called Ruhmeshalle or Volkshalle) with the Reichstag building and the Brandenburg Gate

On 30 January 1937, Hitler appointed Speer as General Building Inspector for the Reich Capital. This carried with it the rank of State Secretary in the Reich government and gave him extraordinary powers over the Berlin city government. He was to report directly to Hitler, and was independent of both the mayor and the Gauleiter of Berlin. Hitler ordered Speer to develop plans to rebuild Berlin. These centered on a three-mile-long grand boulevard running from north to south, which Speer called the Prachtstrasse, or Street of Magnificence; he also referred to it as the "North–South Axis". At the northern end of the boulevard, Speer planned to build the Volkshalle, a huge domed assembly hall over 210 metres (700 ft) high, with floor space for 180,000 people. At the southern end of the avenue, a great triumphal arch, almost 120 metres (400 ft) high and able to fit the Arc de Triomphe inside its opening, was planned. The existing Berlin railroad termini were to be dismantled, and two large new stations built. Speer hired Wolters as part of his design team, with special responsibility for the Prachtstrasse. The outbreak of World War II in 1939 led to the postponement, and later the abandonment, of these plans, which, after Nazi capitulation, Speer himself considered as “awful”.

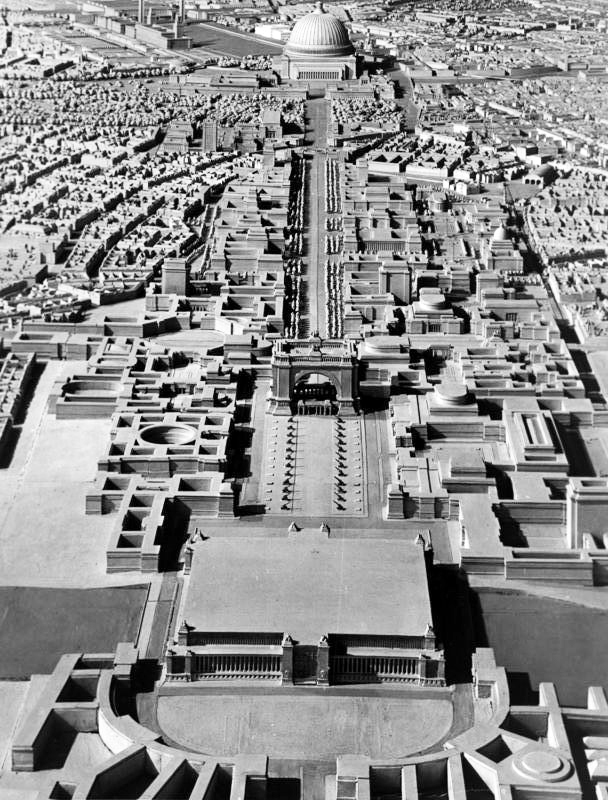
The Volkshalle's Great Dome can be seen at the top of this model of Hitler's plan for Berlin.

Plans to build a new Reich Chancellery had been underway since 1934. Land had been purchased by the end of 1934 and starting in March 1936 the first buildings were demolished to create space at Voßstraße. Speer was involved virtually from the beginning. In the aftermath of the Night of the Long Knives, he had been commissioned to renovate the Borsig Palace on the corner of Voßstraße and Wilhelmstraße as headquarters of the Sturmabteilung (SA). He completed the preliminary work for the new chancellery by May 1936. In June 1936 he charged a personal honorarium of 30,000 Reichsmark and estimated the chancellery would be completed within three to four years. Detailed plans were completed in July 1937 and the first shell of the new chancellery was complete on 1 January 1938. On 27 January 1938, Speer received plenipotentiary powers from Hitler to finish the new chancellery by 1 January 1939. For propaganda Hitler claimed during the topping-out ceremony on 2 August 1938, that he had ordered Speer to complete the new chancellery that year. Shortages of labor meant the construction workers had to work in ten-to-twelve-hour shifts. The SS built two concentration camps in 1938 and used the inmates to quarry stone for its construction. A brick factory was built near the Oranienburg concentration camp at Speer's behest; when someone commented on the poor conditions there, Speer stated, "The Yids got used to making bricks while in Egyptian captivity". The chancellery was completed in early January 1939. The building itself was hailed by Hitler as the "crowning glory of the greater German political empire".

Hitler in Paris in 1940 with Speer (left) and sculptor Arno Breker

During the Chancellery project, the pogrom of Kristallnacht took place. Speer made no mention of it in the first draft of Inside the Third Reich. It was only on the urgent advice of his publisher that he added a mention of seeing the ruins of the Central Synagogue in Berlin from his car. Kristallnacht accelerated Speer's ongoing efforts to dispossess Berlin's Jews from their homes. From 1939 on, Speer's Department used the Nuremberg Laws to evict Jewish tenants of non-Jewish landlords in Berlin, to make way for non-Jewish tenants displaced by redevelopment or bombing. Eventually, 75,000 Jews were displaced by these measures. Speer denied he knew they were being put on Holocaust trains and claimed that those displaced were, "Completely free and their families were still in their apartments". He also said: " ... en route to my ministry on the city highway, I could see ... crowds of people on the platform of nearby Nikolassee Railroad Station. I knew that these must be Berlin Jews who were being evacuated. I am sure that an oppressive feeling struck me as I drove past. I presumably had a sense of somber events." Matthias Schmidt said Speer had personally inspected concentration camps and described his comments as an "outright farce". Martin Kitchen described Speer's often repeated line that he knew nothing of the "dreadful things" as hollow—not only was he fully aware of the fate of the Jews, he actively participated in their persecution.

As Germany started World War II in Europe, Speer instituted quick-reaction squads to construct roads or clear away debris; before long, these units would be used to clear bomb sites. Speer used forced Jewish labor on these projects, in addition to regular German workers. Construction stopped on the Berlin and Nüremberg plans at the outbreak of war. Though stockpiling of materials and other work continued, this slowed to a halt as more resources were needed for the armament industry. Speer's offices undertook building work for each branch of the military, and for the SS, using slave labor. Speer's building work made him among the wealthiest of the Nazi elite.

== Minister of Armaments ==
=== Appointment and increasing power ===
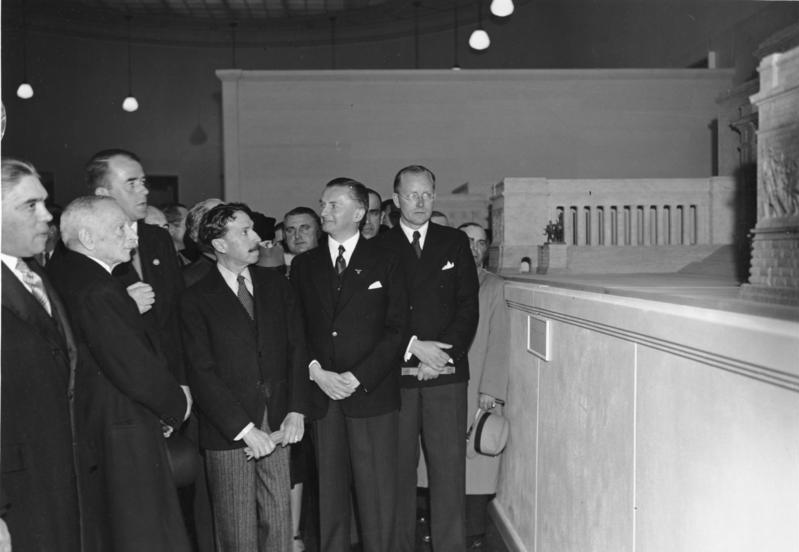
Albert Speer at an exhibition in Lisbon in 1942 with the President of Portugal, Óscar Carmona, second from left

As one of the younger and more ambitious men in Hitler's inner circle, Speer was approaching the height of his power. In 1938, Prussian Minister President Hermann Göring had appointed him to the Prussian State Council. In September 1941, he was made a deputy to the Reichstag, succeeding to a vacancy created by the death of Alter Kämpfer Hermann Kriebel. He represented electoral constituency 2 (Berlin West). On 8 February 1942, Reich Minister of Armaments and Munitions Fritz Todt died in a plane crash shortly after taking off from Hitler's eastern headquarters at Rastenburg. Speer arrived there the previous evening and accepted Todt's offer to fly with him to Berlin. Speer cancelled some hours before take-off because the previous night he had been up late in a meeting with Hitler. Hitler appointed Speer in Todt's place. Martin Kitchen, a British historian, says that the choice was not surprising. Speer was loyal to Hitler, and his experience building prisoner of war camps and other structures for the military qualified him for the job. Speer succeeded Todt not only as Reich Minister but in all his other powerful positions, including Inspector General of German Roadways, Inspector General for Water and Energy and Head of the Nazi Party's Office of Technology. At the same time, Hitler also appointed Speer as head of the Organisation Todt, a massive, government-controlled construction company. Characteristically Hitler did not give Speer any clear remit; he was left to fight his contemporaries in the regime for power and control. As an example, he wanted to be given power over all armaments issues under Göring's Four Year Plan. Göring was reluctant to grant this. However, Speer secured Hitler's support, and on 1 March 1942, Göring signed a decree naming Speer "General Plenipotentiary for Armament Tasks" in the Four Year Plan. Speer proved to be ambitious, unrelenting and ruthless. Speer set out to gain control not just of armaments production in the army, but in the whole armed forces. It did not immediately dawn on his political rivals that his calls for rationalization and reorganization were hiding his desire to sideline them and take control. By April 1942, Speer had persuaded Göring to create a three-member Central Planning Board within the Four Year Plan, which he used to obtain supreme authority over procurement and allocation of raw materials and scheduling of production in order to consolidate German war production in a single agency.

Speer was fêted at the time, and in the post-war era, for performing an "armaments miracle" in which German war production dramatically increased. This miracle was brought to a halt in the summer of 1943 by, among other factors, the first sustained Allied bombing. Other factors probably contributed to the increase more than Speer himself. Germany's armaments production had already begun to result in increases under his predecessor, Todt. Naval armaments were not under Speer's supervision until October 1943, nor the Luftwaffe's armaments until June of the following year. Yet each showed comparable increases in production despite not being under Speer's control. Another factor that produced the boom in ammunition was the policy of allocating more coal to the steel industry. Production of every type of weapon peaked in June and July 1944, but there was now a severe shortage of fuel. After August 1944, oil from the Romanian fields was no longer available. Oil production became so low that any possibility of offensive action became impossible and weaponry lay idle.

As Minister of Armaments, Speer was responsible for supplying weapons to the army. With Hitler's full agreement, he decided to prioritize tank production, and he was given unrivaled power to ensure success. Hitler was closely involved with the design of the tanks, but kept changing his mind about the specifications. This delayed the program, and Speer was unable to remedy the situation. In consequence, despite tank production having the highest priority, relatively little of the armaments budget was spent on it. This led to a significant German Army failure at the Battle of Prokhorovka in 1943, a major turning point on the Eastern Front against the Soviet Red Army.

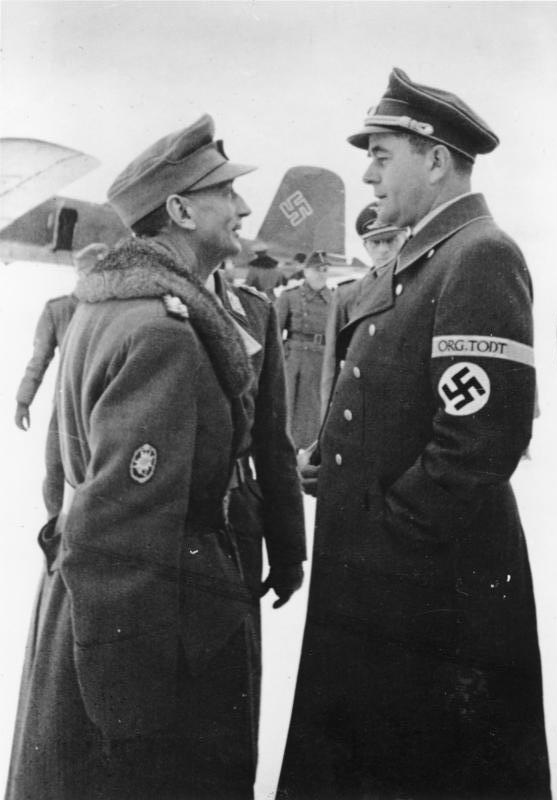
Speer (wearing Organisation Todt armband) and Heer general Eduard Dietl at Rovaniemi Airport in Finland, December 1943

As head of Organisation Todt, Speer was directly involved in the construction and alteration of concentration camps. He agreed to expand Auschwitz and some other camps, allocating 13.7 million Reichsmarks for the work to be carried out. This allowed an extra 300 huts to be built at Auschwitz, increasing the total human capacity to 132,000. Included in the building works was material to build gas chambers, crematoria and morgues. The SS called this "Professor Speer's Special Programme".

Speer realized that with six million workers drafted into the armed forces, there was a labor shortage in the war economy, and not enough workers for his factories. In response, Hitler appointed Fritz Sauckel as a "manpower dictator" to obtain new workers. Speer and Sauckel cooperated closely to meet Speer's labor demands. Hitler gave Sauckel a free hand to obtain labor, something that delighted Speer, who had requested 1,000,000 "voluntary" laborers to meet the need for armament workers. Sauckel had whole villages in France, Holland and Belgium forcibly rounded up and shipped to Speer's factories. Sauckel obtained new workers often using the most brutal methods. In occupied areas of the Soviet Union, that had been subject to partisan action, civilian men and women were rounded up en masse and sent to work forcibly in Germany. By April 1943, Sauckel had supplied 1,568,801 "voluntary" laborers, forced laborers, prisoners of war and concentration camp prisoners to Speer for use in his armaments factories. It was for the maltreatment of these people that Speer was principally convicted at the Nuremberg trials.

=== Consolidation of arms production ===
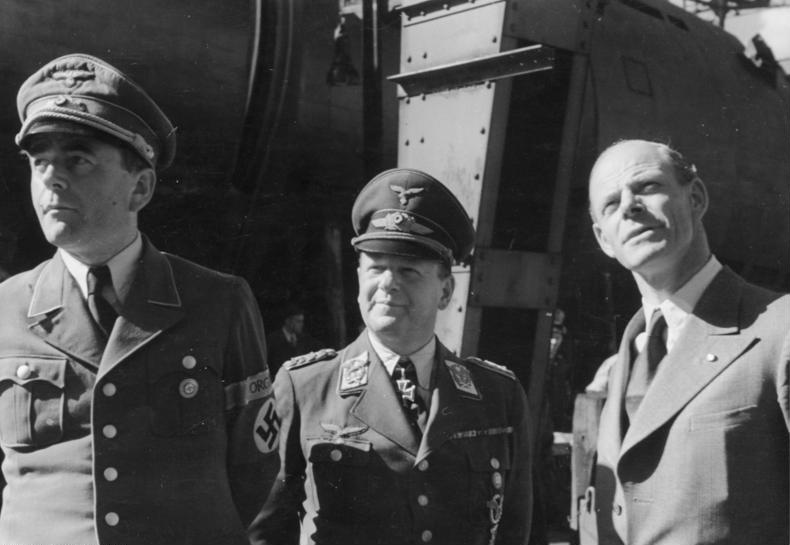
Speer with Luftwaffe field marshal Erhard Milch and aircraft designer Willy Messerschmitt, May 1944

Following his appointment as Minister of Armaments, Speer was in control of armaments production solely for the Army. He coveted control of the production of armaments for the Luftwaffe and Kriegsmarine as well. He set about extending his power and influence with unexpected ambition. His close relationship with Hitler provided him with political protection, and he was able to outwit and outmaneuver his rivals in the regime. Hitler's cabinet was dismayed at his tactics, but, regardless, he was able to accumulate new responsibilities and more power. By July 1943, he had gained control of armaments production for the Luftwaffe and Kriegsmarine. In August 1943, he took control of most of the Ministry of Economics, to become, in Admiral Dönitz's words, "Europe's economic dictator". His formal title was changed on 2 September 1943, to "Reich Minister for Armaments and War Production". He had become one of the most powerful people in Nazi Germany.

Speer and his hand-picked director of submarine construction Otto Merker believed that the shipbuilding industry was being held back by outdated methods, and revolutionary new approaches imposed by outsiders would dramatically improve output. This belief proved incorrect, and Speer and Merker's attempt to build the Kriegsmarine's new generation of submarines, the Type XXI and Type XXIII, as prefabricated sections at different facilities rather than at single dockyards contributed to the failure of this strategically important program. The designs were rushed into production, but the completed submarines were crippled by construction flaws. While dozens of submarines were built, few ever entered service.

In December 1943, Speer visited Organisation Todt workers in Lapland, where he seriously damaged his knee and was incapacitated for several months. He was under the dubious care of Professor Karl Gebhardt at a medical clinic called Hohenlychen where patients "mysteriously failed to survive". In mid-January 1944, Speer had a lung embolism and fell seriously ill. Concerned about retaining power, he did not appoint a deputy and continued to direct work of the Armaments Ministry from his bedside. Speer's illness coincided with the Allied "Big Week", a series of bombing raids on the German aircraft factories that were a devastating blow to aircraft production. His political rivals used the opportunity to undermine his authority and damage his reputation with Hitler. He lost Hitler's unconditional support and began to lose power.

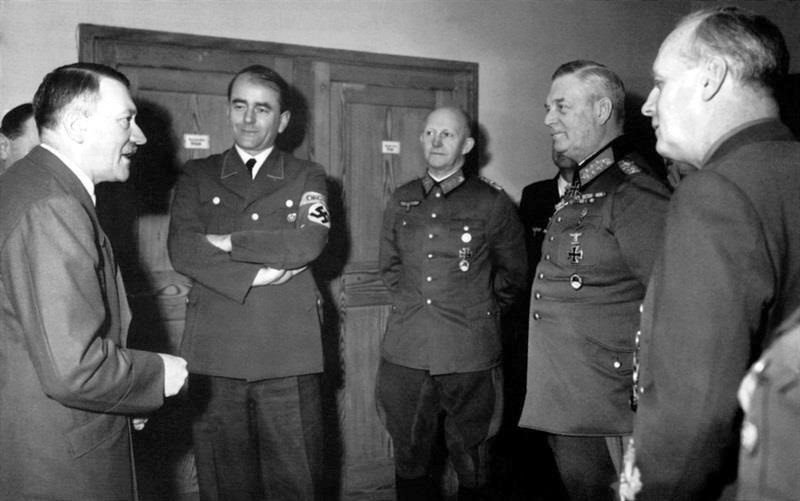
Minister of Foreign Affairs Joachim von Ribbentrop, Field Marshal Wilhelm Keitel, Generaloberst Alfred Jodl and Minister of Armaments Albert Speer brought New Year's greetings "to the Führer" on 1 January 1945.

In response to the Allied Big Week, Adolf Hitler authorized the creation of a Fighter Staff committee. Its aim was to ensure the preservation and growth of fighter aircraft production. The task force was established by 1 March 1944, orders of Speer, with support from Erhard Milch of the Reich Aviation Ministry. Production of German fighter aircraft more than doubled between 1943 and 1944. The growth, however, consisted in large part of models that were becoming obsolescent and proved easy prey for Allied aircraft. On 1 August 1944, Speer merged the Fighter Staff into a newly formed Armament Staff committee.

The Fighter Staff committee was instrumental in bringing about the increased exploitation of slave labor in the war economy. The SS provided 64,000 prisoners for 20 separate projects from various concentration camps including Mittelbau-Dora. Prisoners worked for Junkers, Messerschmitt, Henschel and BMW, among others. To increase production, Speer introduced a system of punishments for his workforce. Those who feigned illness, slacked off, sabotaged production or tried to escape were denied food or sent to concentration camps. In 1944, this became endemic; over half a million workers were arrested. By this time, 140,000 people were working in Speer's underground factories. These factories were death-traps; discipline was brutal, with regular executions. There were so many corpses at the Dora underground factory, for example, that the crematorium was overwhelmed. Speer's own staff described the conditions there as "hell".

The largest technological advance under Speer's command came through the rocket program. It began in 1932 but had not supplied any weaponry. Speer enthusiastically supported the program and in March 1942 made an order for A4 rockets, the predecessor of the world's first ballistic missile, the V-2 rocket. The rockets were researched at a facility in Peenemünde along with the V-1 flying bomb. The V-2's first target was Paris on 8 September 1944. The program, while advanced, proved to be an impediment to the war economy. The large capital investment was not repaid in military effectiveness. The rockets were built at an underground factory at Mittelwerk. Labor to build the A4 rockets came from the Mittelbau-Dora concentration camp. Of the 60,000 people who ended up at the camp, 20,000 died due to the appalling conditions.

On this matter, historian Charles Dick points out that under Speer's direction, the Organisation Todt (responsible for projects like V-2 and fighter jet production) intensified the slave-labor apparatus—reorganizing its institutional structures and driving forced laborers underground into subterranean construction projects—and in doing so, compounded its already catastrophic mortality. Dick correspondingly concludes that Speer, no less than his predecessor, bears substantial responsibility for both the Holocaust and the death toll of the Nazi slave-labor program—a culpability that warrants his recognition among the perpetrators of the regime's criminal enterprise.

On 14 April 1944, Speer lost control of Organisation Todt to his deputy, Franz Xaver Dorsch. He opposed the assassination attempt against Hitler on 20 July 1944. He was not involved in the plot, and played a minor role in the regime's efforts to regain control over Berlin after Hitler survived. After the plot Speer's rivals attacked some of his closest allies and his management system fell out of favor with radicals in the party. He lost yet more authority.

=== Defeat of Nazi Germany ===
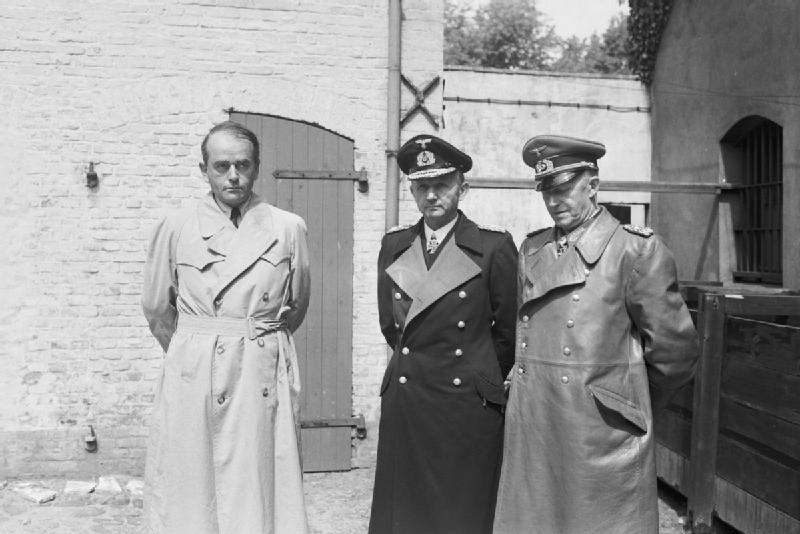
Speer (left), Karl Dönitz and Alfred Jodl (right) after their arrest by the British Army in Flensburg in Northern Germany in May 1945

Losses of territory and a dramatic expansion of the Allied strategic bombing campaign caused the collapse of the German economy from late 1944. Air attacks on the transport network were particularly effective, as they cut the main centres of production off from essential coal supplies. In January 1945, Speer told Goebbels that armaments production could be sustained for at least a year. However, he concluded that the war was lost after Soviet forces captured the important Silesian industrial region later that month. Nevertheless, Speer believed that Germany should continue the war for as long as possible with the goal of winning better conditions from the Allies than the unconditional surrender they insisted upon. During January and February, Speer claimed that his ministry would deliver "decisive weapons" and a large increase in armaments production which would "bring about a dramatic change on the battlefield". Speer gained control over the railways in February, and asked Heinrich Himmler to supply concentration camp prisoners to work on their repair.

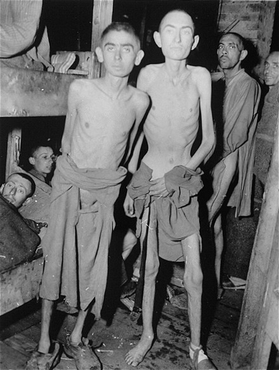
Survivors of the Mühldorf concentration camp upon liberation in 1945. Mühldorf supplied slave workers for the Weingut I project.

By mid-March, Speer had accepted that Germany's economy would collapse within the next eight weeks. While he sought to frustrate directives to destroy industrial facilities in areas at risk of capture, so that they could be used after the war, he still supported the war's continuation. Speer provided Hitler with a memorandum on 15 March, which detailed Germany's dire economic situation and sought approval to cease demolitions of infrastructure. Three days later, he also proposed to Hitler that Germany's remaining military resources be concentrated along the Rhine and Vistula rivers in an attempt to prolong the fighting. This ignored military realities, as the German armed forces were unable to match the Allies' firepower and were facing total defeat. Hitler rejected Speer's proposal to cease demolitions. Instead, he issued the "Nero Decree" on 19 March, which called for the destruction of all infrastructure as the army retreated. Speer was appalled by this order, and persuaded several key military and political leaders to ignore it. During a meeting with Speer on 28/29 March, Hitler rescinded the decree and gave him authority over demolitions. Speer ended them, though the army continued to blow up bridges. (Note: For a treatise on this aspect of the war including Speer's involvement see: Randall, Hansen, Disobeying Hitler: German Resistance in the Last Year of WWII, Faber & Faber, 2014, 1st edition, ISBN 978-0-571-28451-1.)

By April, little was left of the armaments industry, and Speer had few official duties. Speer visited the Führerbunker on 22 April for the last time. He met Hitler and toured the damaged Chancellery before leaving Berlin to return to Hamburg. Speer would later claim in his memoirs that during this visit he "confessed to Hitler [...] that he was disobeying his 'scorched-earth' policy", an assertion which has been described as "pure invention" by historian Richard J. Evans.

During the second week of April, Speer also plotted with Oberst Siegfried Knemeyer—the Luftwaffe chief of technical developments, who was also an experienced pilot—to commandeer a BV 222 aircraft and fly him to Greenland from Travelmunde airport in the North of Berlin.

On 29 April, the day before committing suicide, Hitler dictated a final political testament which dropped Speer from the successor government. Speer was to be replaced by his subordinate, Karl-Otto Saur. Speer was disappointed that Hitler had not selected him as his successor.

After Hitler's death, Speer offered his services to Hitler's successor, Karl Dönitz. On 2 May, Dönitz asked Lutz Graf Schwerin von Krosigk to form a new government, and discussions went on about the formation of the administration for the next few days. On 5 May, Schwerin von Krosigk presented his cabinet (known as the Flensburg government) and Speer was named as Minister of Industry and Production. Speer provided information to the Allies, regarding the effects of the air war, and on a broad range of subjects, beginning on 10 May. On 23 May, two weeks after the surrender of German forces, British troops arrested the members of the Flensburg Government and brought Nazi Germany to a formal end.

== Post-war ==
=== Nuremberg trial ===
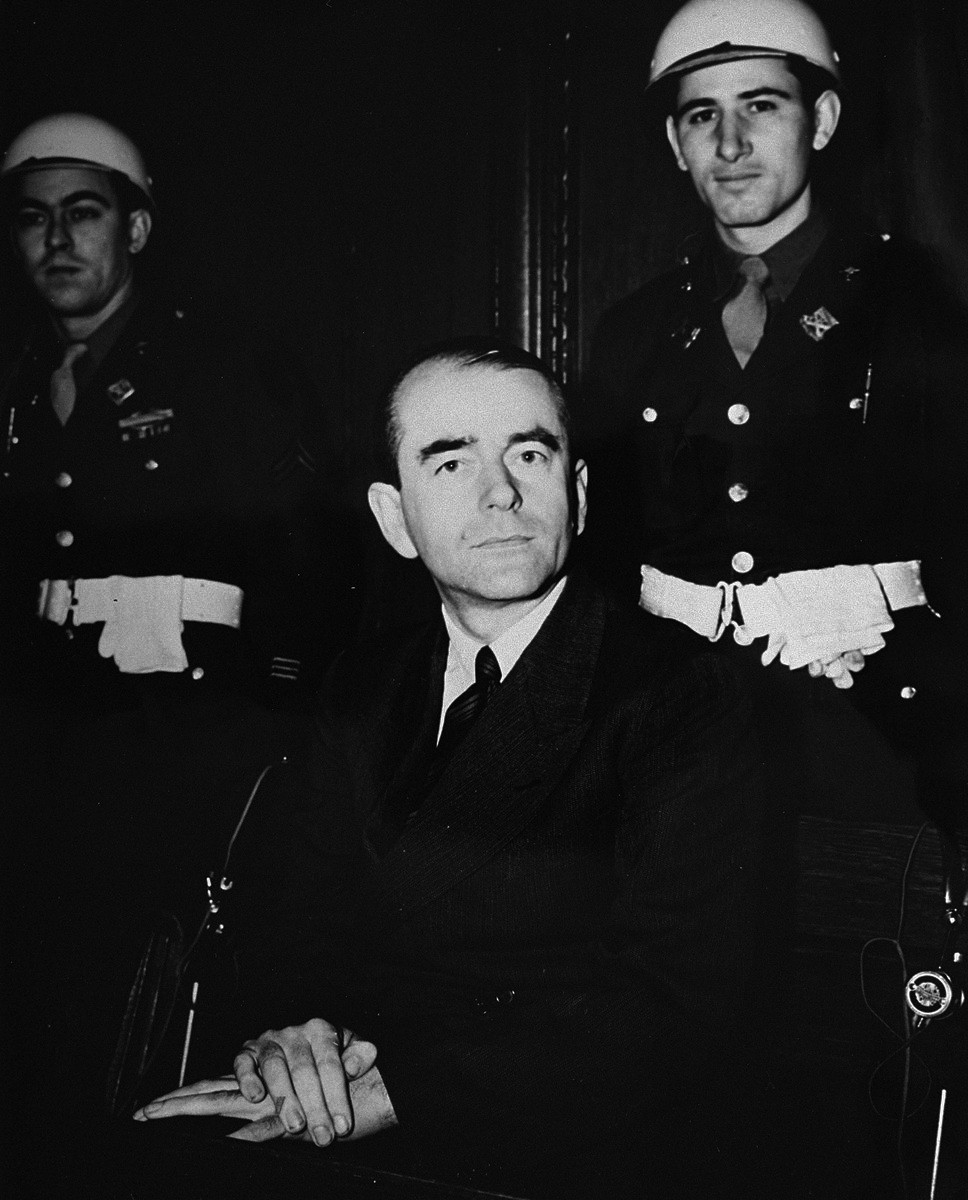
Speer at the Nuremberg trial

Speer was taken to several internment centres for Nazi officials and interrogated. In September 1945, he was told that he would be tried for war crimes, and several days later, he was moved to Nuremberg and incarcerated there. Speer was indicted on four counts: participating in a common plan or conspiracy for the accomplishment of crime against peace; planning, initiating and waging wars of aggression and other crimes against peace; war crimes; and crimes against humanity.

The chief United States prosecutor, Robert H. Jackson, of the U.S. Supreme Court said, "Speer joined in planning and executing the program to dragoon prisoners of war and foreign workers into German war industries, which waxed in output while the workers waned in starvation." Speer's attorney, Hans Flächsner, successfully contrasted Speer with other defendants and portrayed him as an artist thrust into political life who had always remained a non-ideologue.

Speer was found guilty of war crimes and crimes against humanity, principally for the use of slave labor and forced labor. He was acquitted on the other two counts. He had claimed that he was unaware of Nazi extermination plans, and the Allies had no proof that he was aware. His claim was revealed to be false in a private correspondence written in 1971 and publicly disclosed in 2007. On 1 October 1946, he was sentenced to 20 years' imprisonment. While three of the eight judges (two Soviet and American Francis Biddle) advocated the death penalty for Speer, the other judges did not, and a compromise sentence was reached after two days of discussions.

=== Imprisonment ===
On 18 July 1947, Speer was transferred to Spandau Prison in Berlin to serve his prison term. There he was known as Prisoner Number Five. Speer's parents died while he was incarcerated. His father, who died in 1947, despised the Nazis and was silent upon meeting Hitler. His mother died in 1952. As a Nazi Party member, she had greatly enjoyed dining with Hitler. Wolters and longtime Speer secretary Annemarie Kempf, while not permitted direct communication with Speer in Spandau, did what they could to help his family and carry out the requests Speer put in letters to his wife—the only written communication he was officially allowed. Beginning in 1948, Speer had the services of Toni Proost, a sympathetic Dutch orderly, to smuggle mail and his writings.

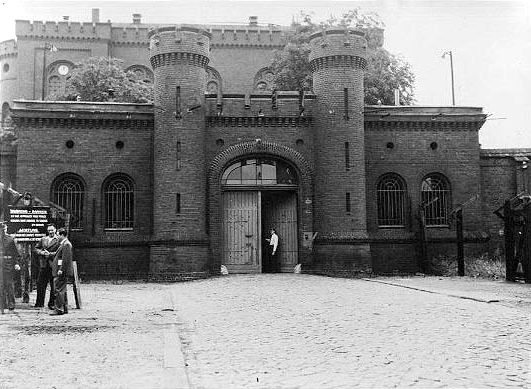
Speer spent most of his sentence at Spandau Prison.

In 1949, Wolters opened a bank account for Speer and began fundraising among those architects and industrialists who had benefited from Speer's activities during the war. Initially, the funds were used only to support Speer's family, particularly for the children's education. However, increasingly the money was used for other purposes, such as for payments to messengers including Proost and for bribes to those who might be able to secure Speer's release. Once Speer became aware of the existence of the fund, he sent detailed instructions about what to do with the money.

The prisoners were forbidden to write memoirs. Speer was able to have his writings sent to Wolters, however, and they eventually amounted to 20,000 pages. He had completed his memoirs by November 1953, and they became the basis of Inside the Third Reich. In Spandau Diaries, Speer aimed to present himself as a tragic hero who had made a Faustian bargain for which he endured a harsh prison sentence.

Much of Speer's energy was dedicated to keeping fit, both physically and mentally, during his long confinement. Spandau had a large enclosed yard where inmates were allocated plots of land for gardening. Speer created an elaborate garden complete with lawns, flower beds, shrubbery, and fruit trees. To make his daily walks around the garden more engaging, Speer embarked on an imaginary trip around the globe. Speer started his "walk" from Berlin and went eastward across the entirety of Eurasia, crossed the Bering Strait into Alaska and then traveled south down the west coast of North America. Carefully measuring distance travelled each day, he mapped distances to real-world geography. He had walked more than 30,000 kilometres (19,000 mi), ending his sentence near Guadalajara, Mexico. Speer also read, studied architectural journals, and brushed up on English and French. In his writings, Speer claimed to have finished five thousand books while in prison. His sentence of twenty years amounted to 7,305 days, which only allotted one and a half days per book.

Speer's supporters maintained calls for his release. Among those who pledged support for his sentence to be commuted were Charles de Gaulle and US diplomat George Wildman Ball. Willy Brandt was an advocate of his release, and put an end to the de-Nazification proceedings against him, which could have caused his property to be confiscated. Speer's efforts for an early release came to naught. The Soviet Union, having demanded a death sentence at trial, was unwilling to entertain a reduced sentence. Speer served a full term and was released at midnight on 1 October 1966.

=== Release and later life ===
Speer's release from prison was a worldwide media event. Reporters and photographers crowded both the street outside Spandau and the lobby of the Hotel Berlin where Speer spent the night. He said little, reserving most comments for a major interview published in Der Spiegel in November 1966. Although he stated he hoped to resume an architectural career, his sole project, a collaboration for a brewery, was unsuccessful. Instead, he revised his Spandau writings into two autobiographical books, Inside the Third Reich (in German, Erinnerungen, or Reminiscences) and Spandau: The Secret Diaries. He later published a work about Himmler and the SS, which has been published in English as The Slave State: Heinrich Himmler's Masterplan for SS Supremacy or Infiltration: How Heinrich Himmler Schemed to Build an SS Industrial Empire (German: Der Sklavenstaat - Meine Auseinandersetzung mit der SS). Speer was aided in shaping the works by Joachim Fest and Wolf Jobst Siedler from the publishing house Ullstein. He found himself unable to re-establish a relationship with his children, even with his son Albert, who had also become an architect. According to Speer's daughter Hilde Schramm, "One by one, my sister and brothers gave up. There was no communication." He provided financial support for his brother Hermann after the war. However, his other brother Ernst died at the Battle of Stalingrad, despite repeated requests from his parents for Speer to repatriate him.

Following his release from Spandau, Speer donated the Chronicle, his personal diary, to the German Federal Archives. It had been edited by Wolters and made no mention of the Jews. David Irving discovered discrepancies between the deceptively edited Chronicle and independent documents. Speer asked Wolters to destroy the material he had omitted from his donation but Wolters refused and retained an original copy. Wolters' friendship with Speer deteriorated, and one year before Speer's death, Wolters gave Matthias Schmidt access to the unedited Chronicle. Schmidt authored the first book highly critical of Speer.

Speer's memoirs were a success. He provided an excuse to older Germans who had been Nazis: if Speer, who had been so close to Hitler, had not known the full extent of the crimes of the Nazi regime and had just been "following orders", then they could tell themselves and others they had done the same. So great was the need to believe this "Speer myth" that Fest and Siedler were able to strengthen it even in the face of mounting historical evidence to the contrary.

=== Death ===
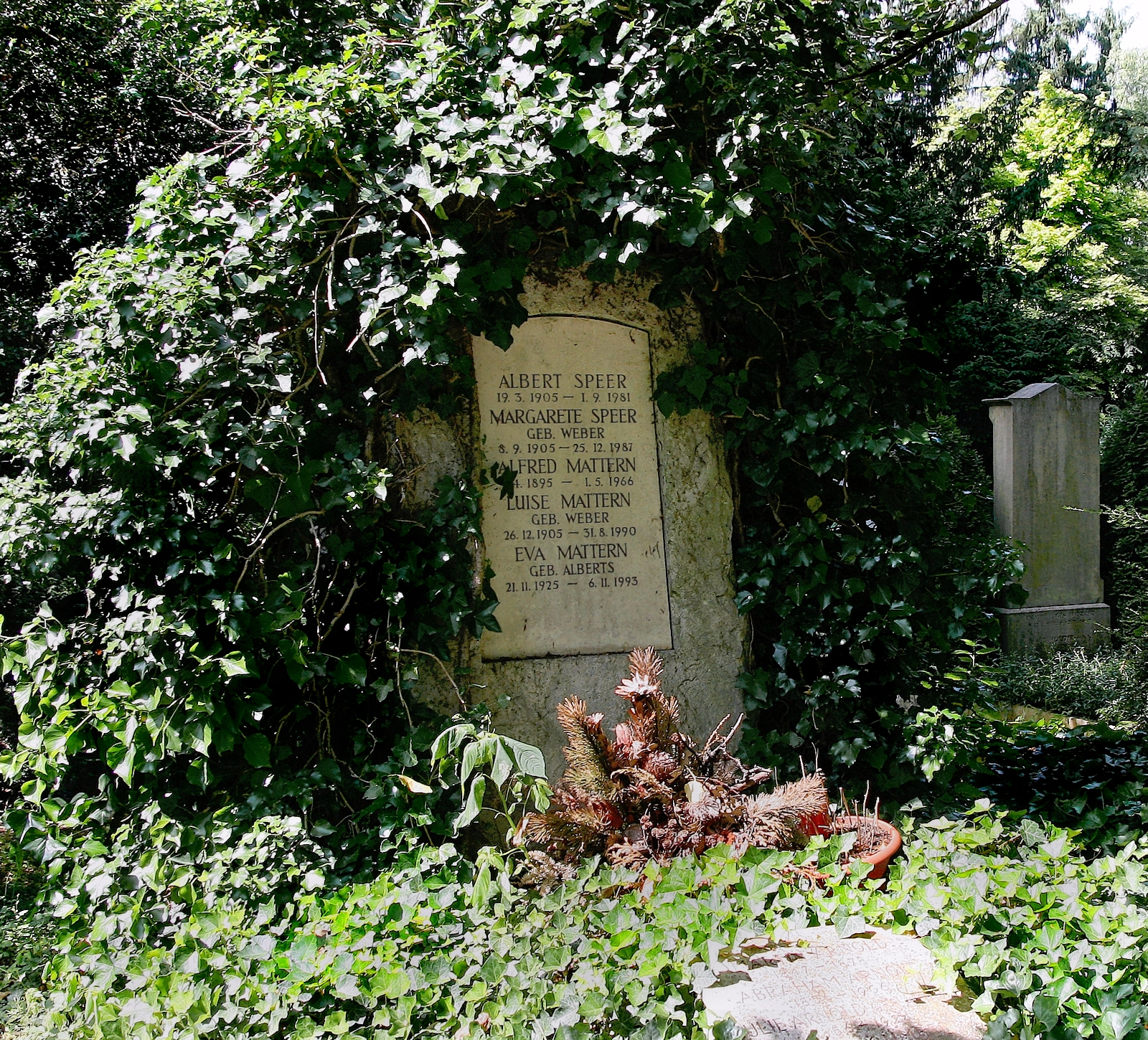
Speer's grave in Heidelberg

Speer made himself widely available to historians and other enquirers. In October 1973, he made his first trip to Britain, flying to London to be interviewed on the BBC Midweek programme. In the same year, he appeared on the television programme The World at War. Speer returned to London in 1981 to participate in the BBC Newsnight programme. He suffered a stroke and died in London on 1 September.

He had remained married to his wife, but he had formed a relationship with a German woman living in London and was with her at the time of his death. His daughter, Margret Nissen, wrote in her 2005 memoirs that after his release from Spandau he spent all of his time constructing the "Speer Myth".

== Speer myth ==
After his release from Spandau, Speer portrayed himself as the "good Nazi". He was well-educated, middle class, and bourgeois, and could contrast himself with those who, in the popular mind, typified "bad Nazis". In his memoirs and interviews, he had distorted the truth and made so many major omissions that his lies became known as "myths". Speer even invented his own birth's circumstances, stating falsely that he was born at midday amid crashes of thunder and bells of the nearby Christ Church, whereas it was between three and five o'clock, and the church was built only some years after. Speer took his myth-making to a mass media level and his "cunning apologies" were reproduced frequently in post-war Germany. Isabell Trommer writes in her biography of Speer that Fest and Siedler were co-authors of Speer's memoirs and co-creators of his myths. In return they were paid handsomely in royalties and other financial inducements. Speer, Siedler and Fest had constructed an image of the "good Nazi" that remained in place for decades, despite historical evidence indicating that it was false.

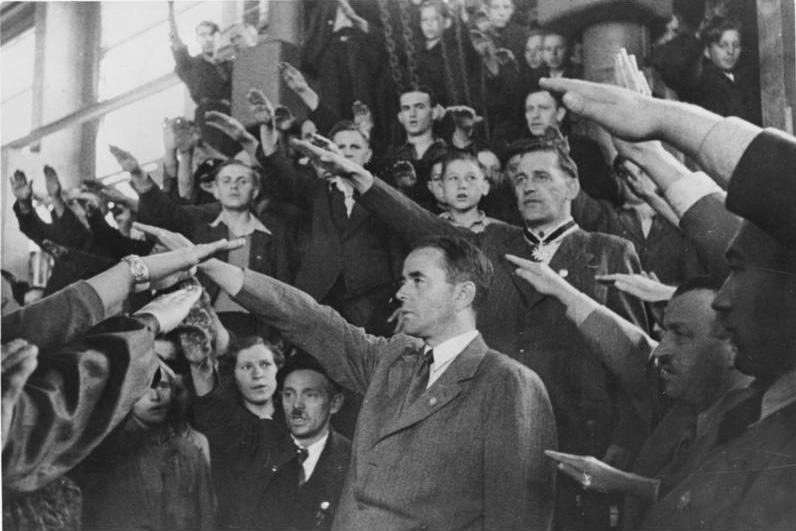
Speer during a visit to a munitions factory in May 1944

Speer had carefully constructed an image of himself as an apolitical technocrat who deeply regretted having failed to discover the monstrous crimes of the Third Reich. This construction was accepted almost at face value by historian Hugh Trevor-Roper when investigating the death of Adolf Hitler for British Intelligence and in writing The Last Days of Hitler. Trevor-Roper frequently refers to Speer as "a technocrat [who] nourished a technocrat's philosophy", one who cared only for his building projects or his ministerial duties, and who thought that politics was irrelevant, at least until Hitler's Nero Decree which Speer, according to his own telling, worked assiduously to counter. Trevor-Roper – who calls Speer an administrative genius whose basic instincts were peaceful and constructive – does take Speer to task, however, for his failure to recognize the immorality of Hitler and Nazism, calling him "the real criminal of Nazi Germany":

For ten years he sat at the very centre of political power; his keen intelligence diagnosed the nature and observed the mutations of Nazi government and policy; he saw and despised the personalities around him; he heard their outrageous orders and understood their fantastic ambitions; but he did nothing. Supposing politics to be irrelevant, he turned aside and built roads and bridges and factories, while the logical consequences of government by madmen emerged. Ultimately, when their emergence involved the ruin of all his work, Speer accepted the consequences and acted. Then it was too late; Germany had been destroyed.

After Speer's death, Matthias Schmidt published a book that demonstrated that Speer had ordered the eviction of Jews from their Berlin homes. By 1999, historians had amply demonstrated that Speer had lied extensively. Even so, public perceptions of Speer did not change substantially until Heinrich Breloer aired the biographical film Speer und Er on television in 2004. The film began a process of demystification and critical reappraisal of Speer. Adam Tooze in his book The Wages of Destruction said Speer had manoeuvred himself through the ranks of the regime skillfully and ruthlessly and that the idea he was a technocrat blindly carrying out orders was "absurd". Trommer said Speer was not an apolitical technocrat; instead, he was, in reality, one of the most powerful and unscrupulous leaders in the entire Nazi regime. Kitchen said Speer had deceived the Nuremberg Tribunal and post-war Germany. Brechtken said that if Speer's extensive involvement in the Holocaust had been known at the time of his trial he would have been sentenced to death.

The image of the "good Nazi" was supported by numerous Speer myths. In addition to the myth that he was an apolitical technocrat, he claimed he did not have full knowledge of the Holocaust or the persecution of the Jews. Another myth posits that Speer revolutionized the German war machine after his appointment as Minister of Armaments. He was credited with a dramatic increase in the shipment of arms that was widely reported as keeping Germany in the war. Another myth centered around a nonexistent plan to assassinate Hitler with poisonous gas. The idea for this myth came to him after he recalled the panic when car fumes came through an air ventilation system. He fabricated the additional details. Brechtken wrote that Speer's most brazen lie was fabricated during an interview with a French journalist in 1952. The journalist described an invented scenario in which Speer had refused Hitler's orders and Hitler had left with tears in his eyes. Speer liked the scenario so much that he included it in his memoirs. The journalist had unwittingly collaborated in creating one of his myths.

Speer also sought to portray himself as an opponent of Hitler's leadership. Despite his opposition to the 20 July plot, he falsely claimed in his memoirs to have been sympathetic to the plotters. He maintained Hitler was cool towards him for the remainder of his life after learning they had included him on a list of potential ministers. This formed a key element of the myths Speer encouraged. Speer also falsely claimed that he had realised the war was lost at an early stage, and thereafter worked to preserve the resources needed for the civilian population's survival. In reality, Speer had sought to prolong the war until further resistance was impossible, thus contributing to the large number of deaths and the extensive destruction Germany suffered during the final months of the war.

=== Denial of responsibility ===
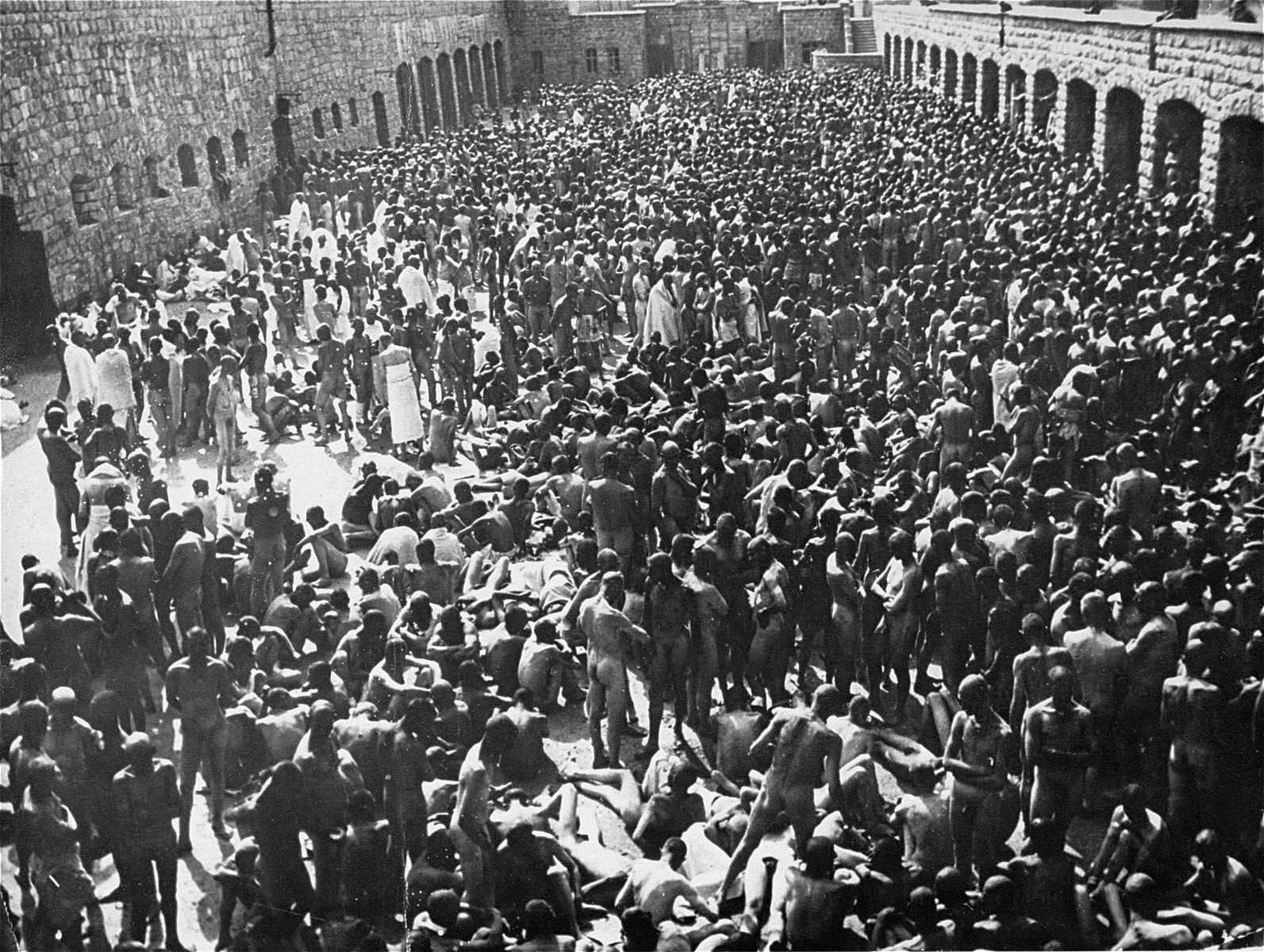
New prisoners awaiting disinfection in the garage yard of Mauthausen concentration camp

Speer maintained at the Nuremberg trials and in his memoirs that he had no direct knowledge of the Holocaust. He admitted only to being uncomfortable around Jews in the published version of the Spandau Diaries. In his final statement at Nuremberg, Speer gave the impression of apologizing, although he did not directly admit any personal guilt and the only victim he mentioned was the German people. Historian Martin Kitchen states that Speer was actually "fully aware of what had happened to the Jews" and was "intimately involved in the 'Final Solution'". Brechtken said Speer only admitted to a generalized responsibility for the Holocaust to hide his direct and actual responsibility. Speer was photographed with slave laborers at Mauthausen concentration camp during a visit on 31 March 1943; he also visited Gusen concentration camp. Although survivor Francisco Boix testified at the Nuremberg trials about Speer's visit, Taylor writes that, had the photo been available, he would have been hanged. In 2005, The Daily Telegraph reported that documents had surfaced indicating that Speer had approved the allocation of materials for the expansion of Auschwitz concentration camp after two of his assistants inspected the facility on a day when almost a thousand Jews were massacred. Heinrich Breloer, discussing the construction of Auschwitz, said Speer was not just a cog in the work—he was the "terror itself".

Speer did not deny being present at the Posen speeches to Nazi leaders at a conference in Posen (Poznań) on 6 October 1943, but claimed to have left the auditorium before Himmler said during his speech: "The grave decision had to be taken to cause this people to vanish from the earth", and later, "The Jews must be exterminated". Speer is mentioned several times in the speech, and Himmler addresses him directly. In 2007, The Guardian reported that a letter from Speer dated 23 December 1971, had been found in a collection of his correspondence with Hélène Jeanty, the widow of a Belgian resistance fighter. In the letter, Speer says, "There is no doubt—I was present as Himmler announced on October 6, 1943, that all Jews would be killed."

=== Armaments miracle ===
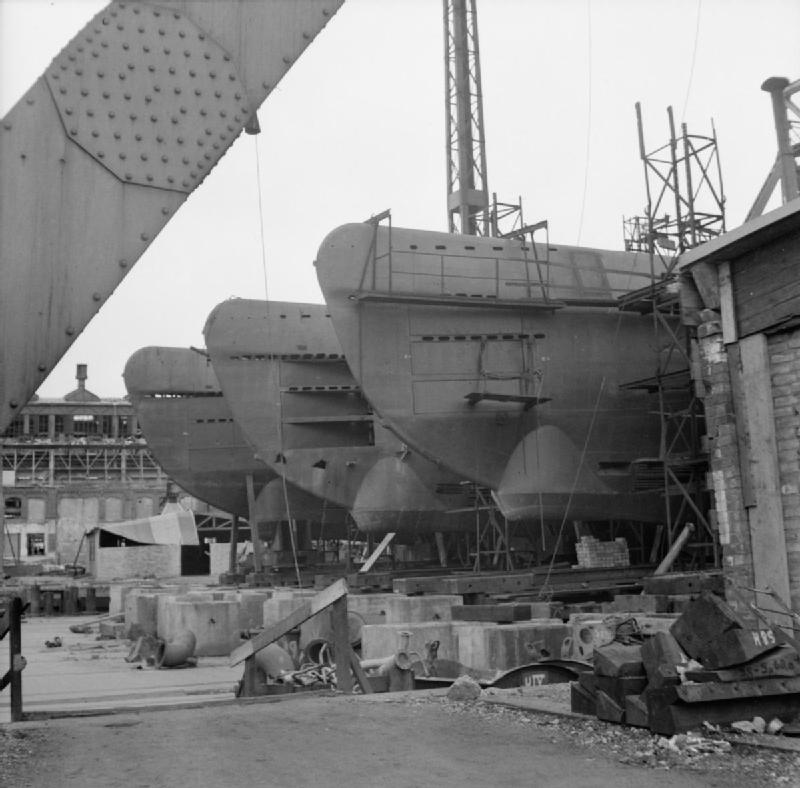
Incomplete German submarines in May 1945; Speer's reforms to submarine production proved counter productive; dozens of submarines never entered service due to design and construction flaws.

Speer was credited with an "armaments miracle". During the winter of 1941–42, in the light of Germany's disastrous defeat in the Battle of Moscow, the German leadership including Friedrich Fromm, Georg Thomas and Fritz Todt had come to the conclusion that the war could not be won. The rational position to adopt was to seek a political solution that would end the war without defeat. Speer in response used his propaganda expertise to display a new dynamism of the war economy. He produced spectacular statistics, claiming a sixfold increase in munitions production, a fourfold increase in artillery production, and he sent further propaganda to the newsreels of the country. He was able to curtail the discussion that the war should be ended.

The armaments "miracle" was a myth; Speer had used statistical manipulation to support his claims. The production of armaments did rise; however, this was due to the normal causes of reorganization before Speer came to office, the relentless mobilization of slave labor and a deliberate reduction in the quality of output to favor quantity. By July 1943, Speer's armaments propaganda became irrelevant because a catalogue of dramatic defeats on the battlefield meant the prospect of losing the war could no longer be hidden from the German public.

== Architectural legacy ==
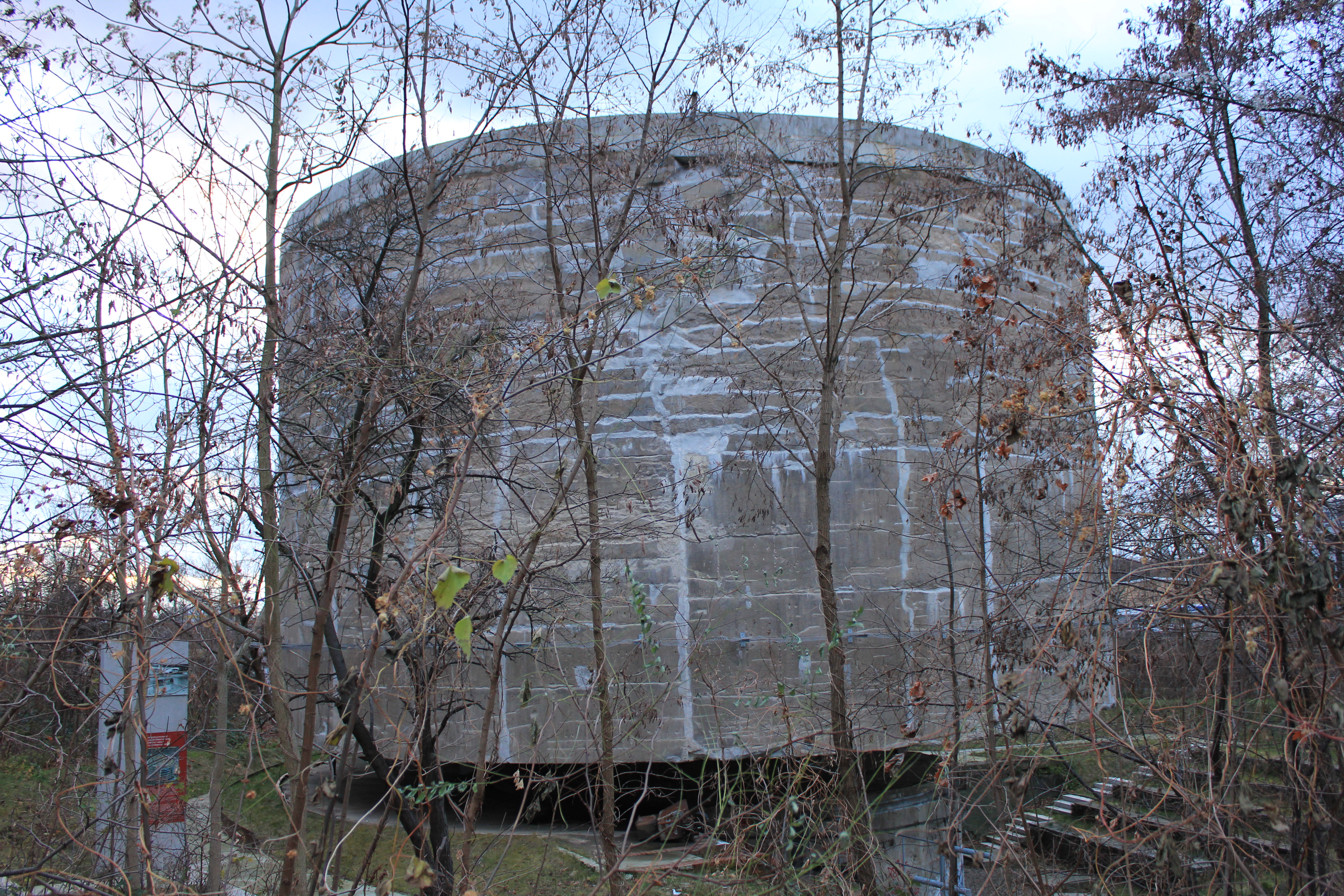
Schwerbelastungskörper in 2011

Little remains of Speer's personal architectural works, other than the plans and photographs. No buildings designed by Speer during the Nazi era are extant in Berlin, other than the four entrance pavilions and underpasses leading to the Victory Column, or Siegessäule, (Note: See the official website of Berlin at: https://www.berlin.de/en/attractions-and-sights/3560160-3104052-victory-column.en.html) and the Schwerbelastungskörper, a heavy load-bearing body built around 1941. The concrete cylinder, 14 metres (46 ft) high, was used to measure ground subsidence as part of feasibility studies for a massive triumphal arch and other large structures planned within Hitler's post-war renewal project for the city of Berlin as the world capital Germania. The cylinder is now a protected landmark and is open to the public. The tribune of the Zeppelinfeld stadium in Nuremberg, though partly demolished, can also be seen.

During the war, the Speer-designed New Reich Chancellery was largely destroyed by air raids and in the Battle of Berlin. The exterior walls survived, but they were eventually dismantled by the Soviets. Unsubstantiated rumors have claimed that the remains were used for other building projects such as the Humboldt University, Anton-Wilhelm-Amo-Straße metro station and Soviet war memorials in Berlin.

== See also ==
- Speer Goes to Hollywood
- Downfall, 2004 German film where he was portrayed by actor Heino Ferch
- Nuremberg, 2000 Canadian-American miniseries where he was portrayed by actor Herbert Knaup
- Legion Speer
- Transportflotte Speer
- Transportkorps Speer
- Hermann Giesler
- List of Nazi Party leaders and officials
- Glossary of Nazi Germany
