= Rudolf Wolters =

German architect and government official (1903–1983)

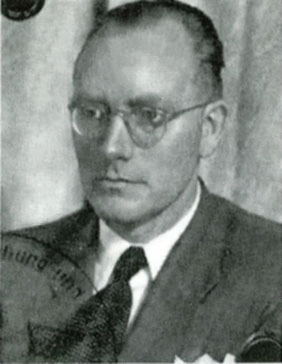
- Nazi era ID photo
- Born: 3 August 1903; Coesfeld, German Empire
- Died: 7 January 1983 (aged 79); Coesfeld, West Germany
- Education: Technische Universität Berlin
- Occupation: Architect
- Buildings: Industrie-Kreditbank building, Düsseldorf; Hotel Königshof, Bonn
- Projects: Reconstruction of Coesfeld after World War II
- Design: Prachtstrasse (North–South Axis), Nazi plan to reconstruct Berlin

Rudolf Wolters (3 August 1903 – 7 January 1983) was a German architect and government official, known for his longtime association with fellow architect and Third Reich official Albert Speer. A friend and subordinate of Speer, Wolters received the many papers which were smuggled out of Spandau Prison for Speer while he was imprisoned there, and kept them for him until Speer was released in 1966. After Speer's release, the friendship slowly collapsed, Wolters objecting strongly to Speer's blaming of Hitler and other Nazis for the Holocaust and World War II, and they saw nothing of each other in the decade before Speer's death in 1981.

Wolters, who was born to a Catholic middle-class family in the northern German town of Coesfeld, obtained his degree and doctorate in architecture from the Technische Hochschule in Charlottenburg (now Technische Universität Berlin), forging a close friendship with Speer while a student. After receiving his doctorate, he had difficulty finding employment prior to the Nazi rise to power. From 1933 to 1937, he worked for the Reichsbahn. In 1937, Speer hired him as a department head, and Wolters soon took major responsibility for Hitler's plan for the large scale reconstruction of Berlin. When Speer became Minister of Armaments and War Production in 1942, Wolters moved to his department, remaining his close associate.

After Speer's indictment and imprisonment for war crimes, Wolters stood by him. In addition to receiving and organizing Speer's clandestine notes from Spandau, which later served as the basis of his best-selling books of memoirs, Wolters quietly raised money for Speer. These funds were used to support Speer's family and for other purposes, according to directions which Wolters received from his former superior. Following Speer's release in 1966, their friendship gradually deteriorated, until the two men became so embittered that Wolters allowed papers demonstrating Speer's knowledge of the persecution of the Jews to become public in 1980.

Wolters was involved in the reconstruction of West Germany following World War II, rebuilding his hometown of Coesfeld among many other projects. Wolters wrote several architectural books during the war, as well as a biography of Speer.

== Early life ==
Wolters was born into a Catholic family in Coesfeld, Germany on 3 August 1903, the son of an architect who had married the daughter of a master carpenter in the shipbuilding trade. In his privately published memoirs, Segments of a Life, Wolters described his father as "a serious, conscientious and diligent man, always concerned about the future". Wolters regarded his mother as "a highly practical woman, full of zest for life, who in hard times thought nothing of serving a delicious roast without letting on it was horsemeat". Wolters passed a generally happy childhood, punctuated by the chaos of the war years, and by a childhood illness that resulted in his being taught at home for a year by two priests.

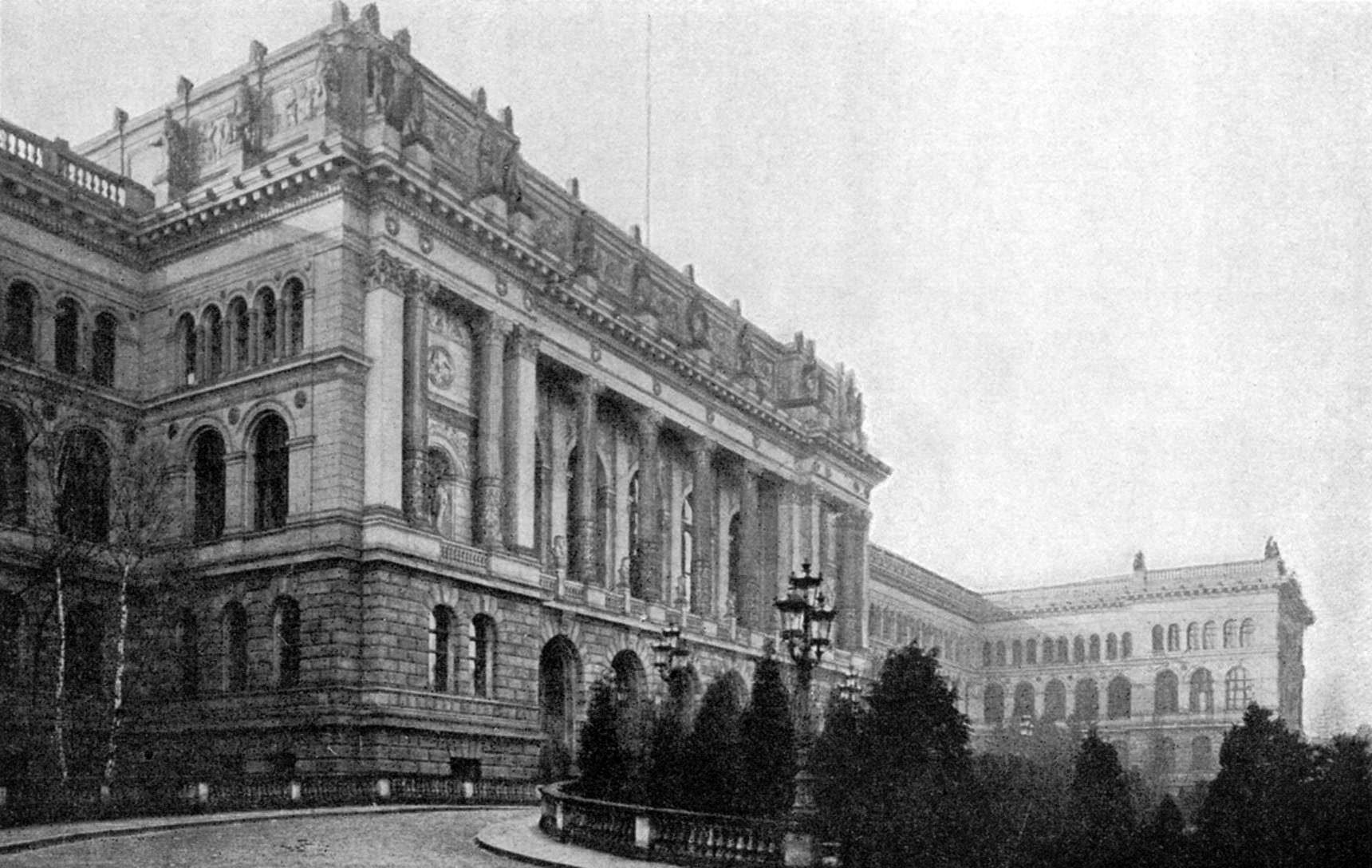
The old northern front of the Technische Hochschule Charlottenburg, which was considerably damaged during the Second World War and replaced by a modern front in the 1960s

After passing his Abitur, or secondary school examination, he began his architectural studies at the Technische Hochschule in Munich (now Technical University of Munich) in 1923. Wolters noted the politicized atmosphere of his student days, stating, "My academic freedom began, one might say, to the sound of drums: the Hitler Putsch and its consequences to us students, most of whom were in agreement with it." Wolters, by his own admission, was in broad sympathy with Nazi aims, though he never saw a need to join the Party.

In 1924, Wolters met Albert Speer, who was a year behind him. Wolters transferred to the Technische Hochschule Charlottenburg later that year, followed by Speer in 1925. Wolters sought to study under Professor Hans Poelzig, but there was no room in the course for the transfer student. Instead, Wolters studied under Heinrich Tessenow, as did Speer. Wolters obtained his degree in 1927, and earned his doctorate at the school two years later. In class prize competition, Wolters generally finished second to Speer.

Wolters' graduation coincided with the start of the Great Depression, and he had great difficulty finding a job, eventually settling for an unpaid position at Reichsbahn headquarters in Berlin in 1930. Upon losing that position the following year, Wolters accepted a position with the Trans-Siberian Railway's urban planning division in Novosibirsk.

== Nazi era ==
In 1933, Wolters returned to Berlin, where he briefly worked as an assistant in Speer's office before returning to the Reichsbahn, this time getting paid for his work. Speer had forged a close relationship with Hitler, and in late 1936, Speer informed Wolters that the dictator would soon appoint Speer as Generalbauinspektor (GBI) or General Building Inspector for the Reich Capital, and suggested that Wolters resign his post with the railway and come work for him again. Wolters did so, beginning work at the GBI office in January 1937 as a Head of Department in the Planning Bureau. Wolters was one of a number of young, well-paid assistants of Speer at the GBI, who were collectively nicknamed "Speer's Kindergarten". Most of the Kindergarteners were not Nazi Party members, since Speer found that Party duties interfered with working time, and the Kindergarten was expected to work long hours. Speer had Hitler's permission to hire non-Nazis, so the GBI became something of a political sanctuary.

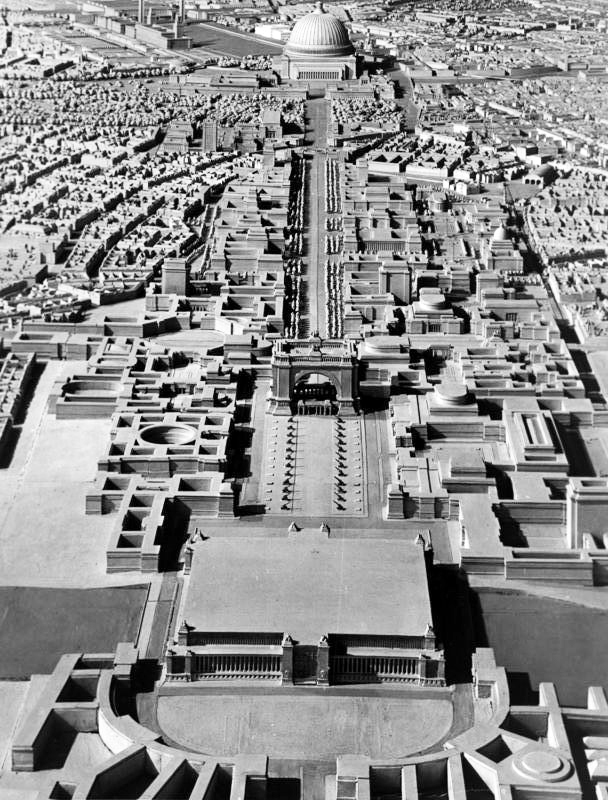
A model of Speer's plan for Berlin, centered on the Prachtstrasse

Wolters later wrote of his views at this time:

I had viewed Hitler and his movement with some skepticism, but when the abolition of the multi-party mess removed the obscenity of unemployment, and the first 1,000 kilometers of autobahns opened up a new era of mobility, I too saw the light: this was the time when Churchill said he hoped Great Britain would have a man like Hitler in time of peril, and when high church dignitaries and distinguished academics paid the Führer homage.

Much of Wolters' work at the GBI was connected to Hitler's plan for the large scale reconstruction of Berlin. The dictator had placed Speer in charge of this plan. The centerpiece of the scheme was a grand boulevard, 4.8 kilometres (3.0 mi) long, dubbed by Speer as the Prachtstrasse (Street of Magnificence) or "North–South Axis", for which the main design responsibility was delegated to Wolters. Wolters was also responsible for transport rings in the new Berlin, for museums, and for the GBI's press office. In 1939, Wolters became responsible for the architecture portion of the magazine, Die Kunst im Deutschen Reich (Art in the German Reich).

Wolters made several trips abroad in connection with his duties for the GBI. He visited the United States to study advanced transport systems, and Paris for the 1937 international exposition there. In 1939, Joseph Goebbels appointed him Exhibition Commissioner. Wolters took charge of organizing German architectural exhibits presented in other countries. Until 1943, Wolters traveled to other European capitals, and in addition to his duties as commissioner, gathered political intelligence. On his return, Wolters passed along his insights to Speer and some of these thoughts reached Hitler's ears.

In 1940, Wolters, a longtime diarist, suggested to Speer that he begin keeping a Chronik, or chronicle of the GBI's activities. Speer agreed, and instructed department heads to send Wolters raw material for the Chronik on a regular basis. Among other matters, the Chronik detailed the GBI's responsibility for administering a 1939 amendment to the Nuremberg Laws which allowed Aryan landlords to evict Jewish tenants with virtually no notice. For example, the entry for August 1941 included this information: "According to a Speer directive a further action for the clearing of some five thousand Jewish flats is being started." The November entry noted that "roughly 4,500 Jews were evacuated". The dispossessed Jews were sent to the occupied territories, with the newspapers reporting, as directed by Goebbels: "Over the past few days many Jews have hurriedly left Germany, leaving debts behind them."

Wolters was given the additional task in 1941 of setting up a special section of the government publishing house which specialized in works of architecture. Wolters wrote several books on the Third Reich's architectural works during the war years. He rejected the notion that Nazi architecture was an imitation of classical models: "Those who speak of neo-classicism have not understood the spirit of our buildings."

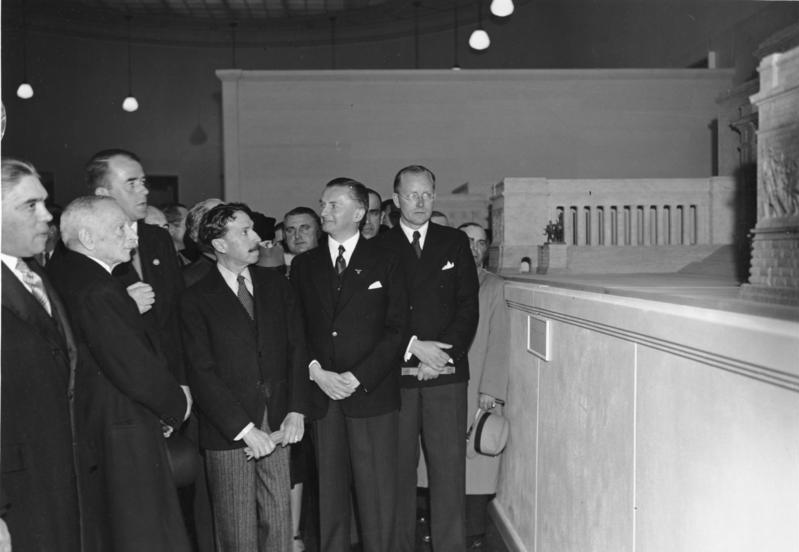
Wolters (right) at an exhibition in Lisbon in 1942 with Speer and the President of Portugal

In February 1942, following the death of Fritz Todt, Hitler appointed Speer as Minister of Armaments and War Production. Wolters followed Speer to his new ministry, becoming head of the Department of Culture, Media, and Propaganda of the Organization Todt. Wolters continued his Chronik in the new position.

In December 1943, Speer put Wolters in charge of planning for the reconstruction of bombed German cities. Wolters organized a working group of about twenty architects and city planners, mostly from northern Germany. The work of this group, known as the Arbeitsstab Wiederaufbauplanung (Task Force for Reconstruction Planning), would form the basis for the actual postwar reconstruction of Germany. Speer, who authorized the group, saw an opportunity to make German cities more habitable in the age of the automobile. The group sought solutions which would use the existing street system, rather than the grand ceremonial boulevards common in Nazi city planning. In addition, the Arbeitsstab issued extensive guidelines, ranging from the width of avenues that carried streetcar lines to the ratio of theatre seats to inhabitants.

Wolters rarely met Hitler, and only in the company of other members of Speer's office. He later recorded,

Of course, from these few experiences, I cannot judge Hitler's personality, but having shared with Speer his virtually daily contacts with him, and being familiar with Hitler's ideas, for example, on town planning, I think that commentators are making it easy for themselves now when, as they frequently do, they resort in their descriptions to simplistic epitaphs such as "buck private", "wall painter", "petit-bourgeois philistine", or "history's greatest criminal".

Wolters' longtime secretary, Marion Riesser, was half-Jewish, and Wolters protected her throughout the war. In late 1944, word reached them that those with Jewish ancestry who remained free would be called up and used for cannon fodder. Wolters met with Riesser and the three other half-Jews in the Speer organizations, telling them if it became necessary (which it did not), the four would be transferred to essential war factories where they would be safe. Wolters told them, "With Albert Speer's help one can do anything."

In February 1945, as the Nazi regime collapsed, Speer instructed Wolters to take other high-ranking officials in his department, including Heinrich Lübke, and set up architectural offices in the north of Germany to work on large-scale prefabricated housing. Speer expected to join them, but not then, as he anticipated that the Allies would want to use his expertise towards the reconstruction of Germany. This did not come to pass; Speer was arrested and charged with war crimes.

== After the war ==
=== Architectural work ===
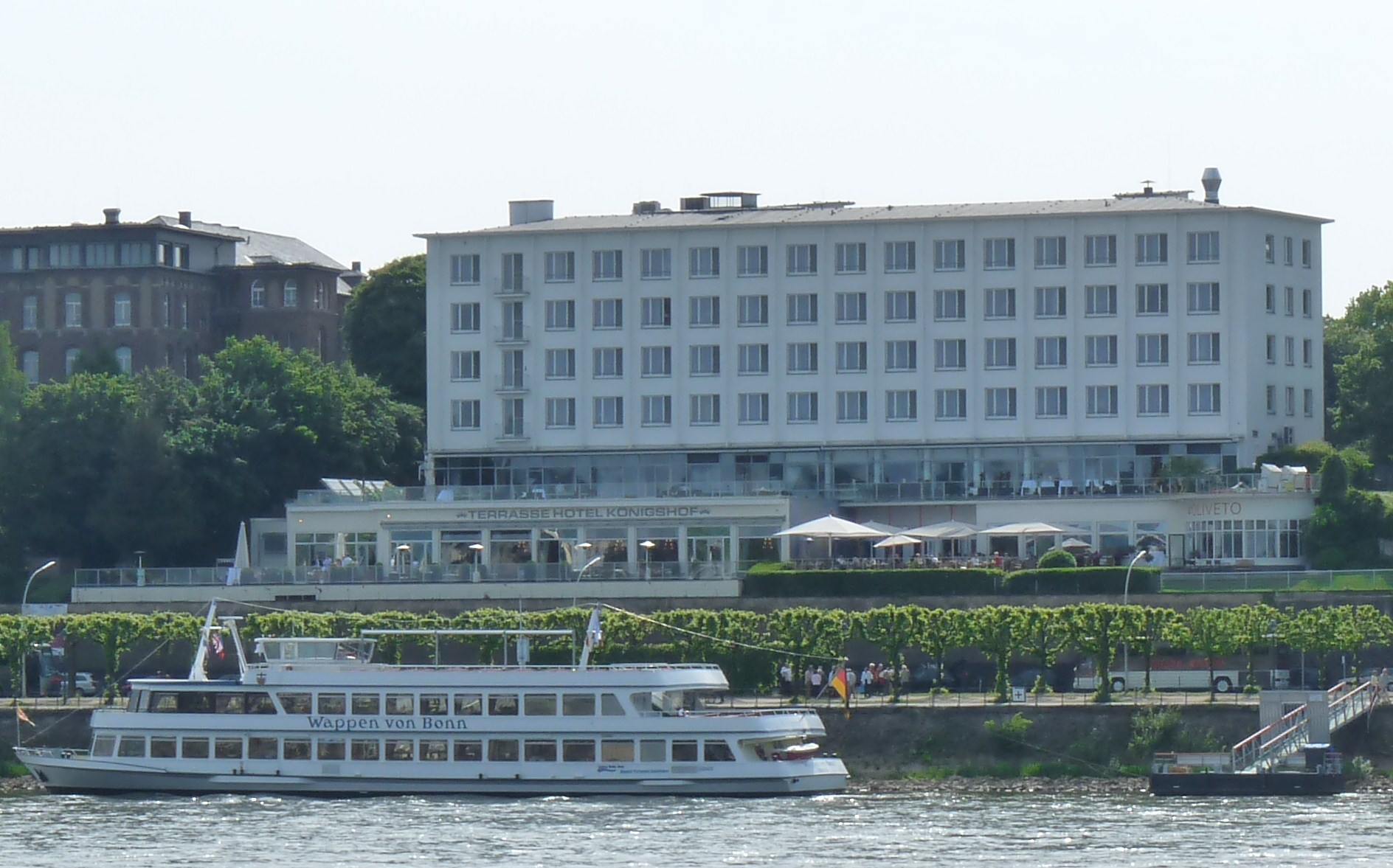
The Hotel Königshof, Bonn

As Speer had instructed, Wolters set up a small office in the North German town of Höxter with Lübke, who knew the town's mayor. The new office was soon commissioned to rebuild a bridge which had been destroyed, contrary to Speer's instructions to preserve infrastructure. Later in 1945, the office was dissolved, and Wolters returned to his hometown of Coesfeld where he had been commissioned to rebuild the ruined city. Lübke instead turned to politics, rising quickly through the political ranks of postwar Germany. In 1959, Lübke became President of the Federal Republic of Germany, a position in which he served almost ten years before he resigned over questions about what he may have known about forced labor while working in Speer's department.

Wolters was forced to rebuild in Coesfeld almost from scratch. With the widespread destruction, he had to lay out lots and rebuild streets, all without delay. He built a road through the grounds of the local castle, and converted the building into a hotel and conference center. The versatility he showed in the rebuilding of Coesfeld led to other commissions from German cities, including Rheine, Borken and Anholt.

In 1947 and 1949, Wolters organized meetings of the former Arbeitsstab members, many of whom were intensively involved in the postwar reconstruction efforts. In 1950, Wolters won a competition to design the new police headquarters in Dortmund. The Hotel Königshof in Bonn, rebuilt by Wolters, had previously been the leading hotel in the city. It reopened by hosting the President of Italy in 1956 on his state visit, and again became the leading hotel in the then-capital of the Federal Republic, hosting heads of state (including U.S. Presidents Kennedy, Nixon, and Reagan), state dinners, and events hosted by the Chancellor of Germany.

Wolters received so many commissions from the government of North Rhine-Westphalia that he opened an additional office in Düsseldorf. In 1955, Wolters won a competition to design the Industrie-Kreditbank building in Düsseldorf. Two years later, he was again successful in that city in a competition to design the Galarie Conzen. Wolters was awarded a prize for his design to reconstruct Düsseldorf's Altstadt (Old City). His son, Fritz Wolters, also an architect, described him as a man who fought uncompromisingly for what he saw as the "whole" in urban planning, and once ended a discussion with a local committee with the remark that they had "rented his head, not his pencil". Wolters also considered himself to be a "functionalist", designing a number of concrete, flat roofed, modern hospitals.

In the 1960s, Wolters and his son shared an office until their architectural differences separated them, Fritz Wolters being more interested in the small details rather than in what he described as "epoch-making" solutions. However, their personal relationship survived this professional separation. In 1978, Wolters published a book on the town centre of Berlin, but despite suggestions from his son, he declined to include his views about Nazi architecture, and never did set forth such views to his colleagues.

=== Association with Speer ===
==== Spandau years ====
Wolters did not attend the Nuremberg trial (he later described it as a "victor's court" and as a "show trial") but wrote to Speer in January 1946, during the trial: "I stand by you in misfortune as in the good days. I believe as before in your lucky star." On 10 August, as the trial approached its conclusion, Speer, anticipating the likelihood of a death sentence, wrote to Wolters asking him to "collect my work together for later ages and to recount much of my life. I think it will be honored one day." Despite his forebodings, Speer did not receive the death sentence, but on 1 October 1946 was given a sentence of twenty years in prison, and on 18 July 1947 was transferred to Spandau Prison to serve it.

Wolters and longtime Speer secretary Annemarie Kempf, while not permitted direct communication with Speer in Spandau, did what they could to help his family and carry out the requests Speer put in letters to his wife—the only written communication officially allowed Speer. Beginning in 1948, Speer had the services of a sympathetic Dutch orderly to smuggle mail. In 1949, Wolters opened a special bank account for Speer, the Schulgeldkonto or "School Fund Account", and began fundraising among those architects and industrialists who had benefited from Speer's activities during the war. At first the funds were used only to support Speer's family, but as the amounts grew and Speer's family became increasingly able to support itself, the money was used for everything from vacations for Speer's Spandau conduit, Toni Proost, to bribes for those who might be able to secure Speer's release. Once Speer became aware of the existence of the fund, he would often send detailed instructions about what to do with the money. Wolters raised a total of DM158,000 for Speer over the final seventeen years of his sentence.

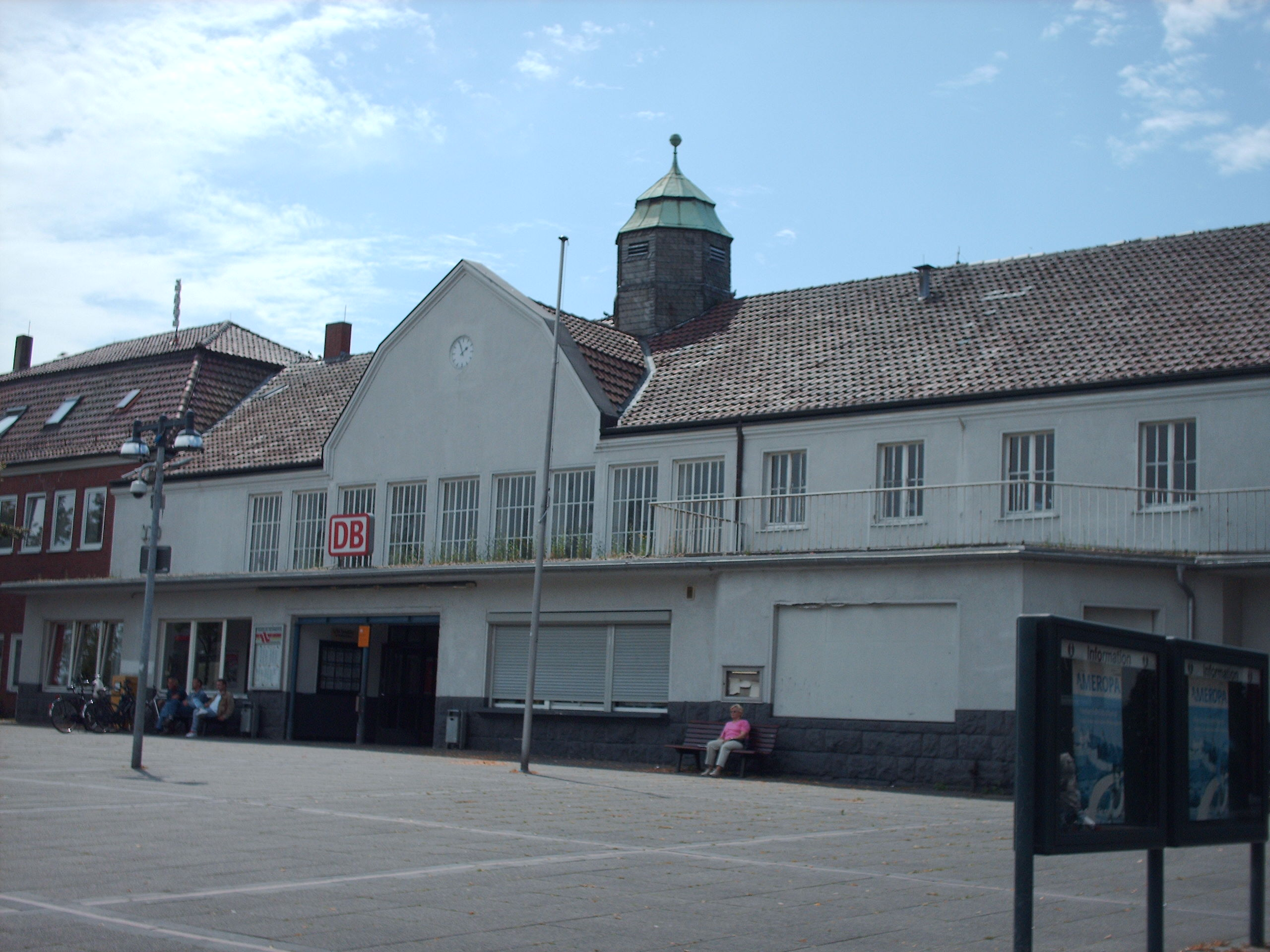
The town of Coesfeld, reconstructed by Wolters

In 1951, with secret means of communications established, Wolters sent his first letter to Speer in five years. He suggested that Speer move ahead with his memoirs. In January 1953, Speer began work on his draft memoirs, and over the next year lengthy missives, sometimes written on tobacco wrappings or candy wrappers but most often on toilet paper, made their way to Wolters' office in Coesfeld. Marion Riesser, who had continued as Wolters' secretary as he began private architectural practice, transcribed these notes into as many as forty closely typed pages per missive, and the draft totalled 1,100 pages. Wolters objected that Speer called Hitler a criminal in the draft, and Speer presciently observed that he would likely lose a good many friends were the memoirs ever to be published. Wolters had come to believe that reports of Nazi genocide were exaggerated by a factor of at least ten, that Hitler had not been given credit for the things he did right and that Germany had been harshly treated by the Allies.

In the mid-1950s, Wolters quarrelled with Kempf who effectively dropped out of the network for a number of years, adding to the burden on Wolters and Riesser. While Speer's pleas for his former associate and his former secretary to work together eventually brought about a healing of the breach, this was to some degree superficial as Kempf was aware that Wolters, even then, disagreed with Speer's opinions. Wolters questioned Speer's readiness to accept responsibility for the Nazi regime's excesses and did not believe Speer had anything to apologise for, though the strength of his feelings on this point was kept from Speer—but not from Kempf and Riesser.

Wolters was tireless in his efforts on behalf of Speer and his family to such an extent that his son, Fritz, later expressed feelings of neglect. For Speer's fiftieth birthday in March 1955, Wolters gathered letters from many of Speer's friends and wartime associates, and saw to it that they made their way inside the walls of Spandau in time for Speer's birthday. Wolters gave Speer's son Albert a summer job in his Düsseldorf office and a place to stay—in fact, Wolters hosted all six of the Speer children at one time or another. By prior arrangement, he and Speer tried to get in touch with each other by telepathy one New Year's Eve—but both men fell asleep before midnight struck.

Wolters constantly sought Speer's early release, which required the consent of the four occupying powers. He engaged Düsseldorf attorney, and later state minister, Werner Schütz to lobby high German officials to get them to advocate Speer's release. Schütz, who refused to ask for his expenses, was unsuccessful even though Lübke, West German President for the last seven years of Speer's incarceration, had worked under Speer. Wolters had more success fending off denazification proceedings against Speer, collecting many affidavits in Speer's favor, including one from Tessenow whom Speer had shielded during the war. Those proceedings dragged on for years, and were eventually ended by order of Willy Brandt, a strong supporter of Speer's.

As early as 1956, Wolters feared the effect that disclosure of the GBI's eviction of Jewish tenants might have on Speer. Wolters wrote to Kempf concerning the denazification proceedings, "I am only anxious about the matter of the clearance of Jew-flats in Berlin. That could be a bullseye. And this is the point to which the defense should direct itself ..." In 1964, Speer mentioned to Wolters in a letter that he would need the Chronik as a reference in revising his memoirs upon his release. Wolter's response was to have Riesser retype the entire Chronik, leaving out any mention of the GBI's involvement in the persecution of the Jews, without telling Speer what he was doing. Wolters later wrote that he did this to correct mistakes, to leave out extraneous matters, and "above all to delete certain parts on the basis of which Speer and one or another of his colleagues could still have been prosecuted. The Ludwigsburg Central office for 'war crimes' was still at work and an end of the persecution of National Socialists was not in sight."

In April 1965, with only eighteen months left of Speer's sentence, Wolters wrote to him of their prospective reunion, "[I]t will have been twenty years since I saw you last. What will there be between us old codgers, aside of course from happy memories of skiing tours in the long distant past[?] ... Will you come to me mainly to take receipt of the promised gift I have held for you in our cellar—that long cured Westphalian ham, and those patiently waiting bottles of your favorite nectar: Johannisberger 1937? Could these things of the senses end up being all that there is between us? I am so happy that the moment approaches, but my heart is heavy ..."

According to Riesser, she thought that Wolters "was frightened of the reality of Speer". However, Kempf thought Wolters wished Speer ill. Speer was unaware of the depth of Wolters' feelings, and later told his biographer-to-be Joachim Fest that Wolters was the closest friend he had. Speer added that during the Spandau years, Wolters performed invaluable services for him and that he did not know how he would have survived Spandau without Wolters' assistance.

Throughout the latter part of Speer's imprisonment, Wolters was a faithful correspondent, writing lengthy letters to Speer at least once a month, attempting to tell Speer everything that might interest him but nothing that might hurt him. When Speer invented the concept of his "world wide walk", imagining his daily exercise around the prison yard to be segments in a long walk from Europe through Asia to North America, Wolters supplied Speer with details of what he would "see". Speer later stated, "In a manner of speaking, Rudi Wolters accompanied me on these walks." As midnight struck and 1 October 1966 began, Speer was released from Spandau Prison. His last use of the clandestine message system was to have a telegram sent to Wolters, in which Speer jokingly asked Wolters to pick him up thirty-five kilometres south of Guadalajara, Mexico, which he had "reached" after walking 31,936 kilometres.

==== Deterioration of relationship ====
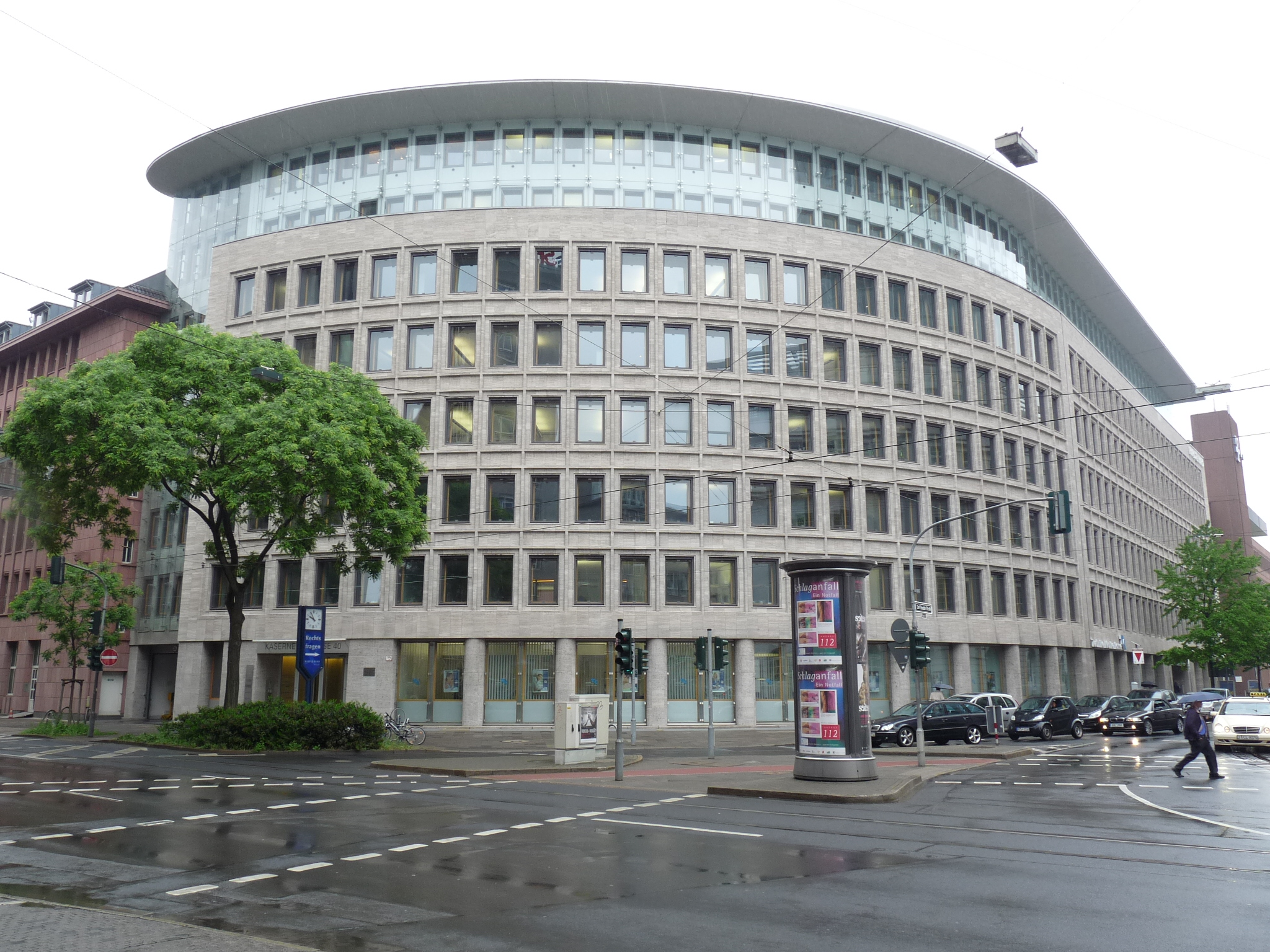
Düsseldorf's Industrie-Kreditbank building, designed by Wolters

After spending two weeks with his family, Speer came to Coesfeld to visit Wolters in October 1966. Shortly before Speer's visit, Annemarie Kempf had visited Wolters in Coesfeld to ask him not to allow his differences with Speer to affect their first meeting. Wolters responded that he and Speer were "too far apart". The visit was quickly marred by Speer's insistence on inviting industrialist Ernst Wolf Mommsen to Wolters' home instead of allowing a one-on-one reunion. According to Wolters' son Fritz, his father was furious and hurt by the perceived slight. While the actual meeting was casual and cordial (in addition to the long-promised ham and wine, Wolters turned over all of the accumulated papers from Speer, the censored copy of the Chronik and the remaining balance of DM25,000 in the School Fund Account), Wolters later wrote, "I knew that day of that first still merry reunion that the Spandau friendship was over. As he stood there, in person, I saw him suddenly quite differently than I had previously."

Wolters was perturbed by an interview with Speer published in Der Spiegel in November 1966, in which Speer, while again taking responsibility for crimes of the Nazi era, blamed Hitler, rather than Germany, for starting World War II. Wolters wrote to Speer on 30 November, describing Speer's assignment of blame as a "dangerous oversimplification made entirely from today's perspective ... You will surely remember that in 1939 we were all of the opinion that Hitler was Germany. Although we were certainly depressed rather than enthusiastic about the war in Poland, we surely considered that the responsibility for it was to be found in the provocative conduct by the Poles, and it was the British who made of it a world war." Wolters asked Speer to "concentrate wholly on what really happened, leaving aside what the world thinks of it now".

Their relationship was further embittered by Speer's failure to mention Wolters by name in Speer's first book based on the Spandau material, Inside the Third Reich. Speer's initial draft of the book, written while in Spandau, does mention his "old university friend, Dr. Rudolf Wolters, to whom was assigned the most essential task, the Prachtstrasse" in connection with the Berlin project. However, Wolters' name appears nowhere in the published version, and no mention is made of Wolters' help, essential to the writing and preservation of the draft memoir. Speer later told his future biographer, Gitta Sereny, that he did so to protect Wolters, since it might have been risky for Wolters to have been known to have assisted an imprisoned war criminal. Sereny notes in her biography of Speer that it would not have been in Speer's interest to have publicized Wolter's assistance, given the growing disagreement between them over Speer's statements. Wolter's son, Fritz, suggested that had Speer mentioned Wolters even once, "it would have made all the difference", since it would have shown that Speer acknowledged the debt he owed Wolters for his efforts during his incarceration.

After the German edition of Inside the Third Reich was published in late 1969, Speer proposed a visit to the embittered Wolters in Coesfeld. Wolters advised against it, sarcastically suggesting that he was surprised that the author did not "walk through life in a hair shirt, distributing his fortune among the victims of National Socialism, forswear all the vanities and pleasures of life and live on locusts and wild honey". Nevertheless, Wolters expressed a willingness to meet, proposing (rather pointedly) a meeting at Wolters' house on 19 November, Buß- und Bettag, the day of penance and prayer for German Protestants. Speer duly visited, and as the two sat down to lunch, enquired, "Where are the locusts?"

With research concluded upon Inside the Third Reich, Speer had donated the edited Chronik to the German Federal Archives in Koblenz in July 1969. David Irving compared the donated Chronik with a copy of the Chronik for 1943 in the Imperial War Museum in London, and discovered discrepancies. Irving asked the Archives and Speer the reason for the differences (which were minor compared with previous years). Speer requested an explanation from Wolters, and Wolters admitted the censorship by letter in January 1970, saying, "I wouldn't have put it past the Ludwigsbergern [German war crimes prosecutors] to launch an additional prosecution against you on the pretext that this charge [of evicting the Jews] was not included in the Nuremberg Indictment." Speer suggested that the pages of the Chronik dealing with the Jews should not exist, and informed the Archives that the original of the Chronik, from which the copy given to the Archives had been made, had disappeared. Wolters did not destroy the original as Speer had hinted.

Wolters' anger towards Speer burst into the open in 1971 after Speer did a lengthy interview for Playboy, in which he again took responsibility for Nazi crimes and blamed Hitler and his associates for the war.

What is the matter with you that, that even after the unending admissions of guilt in [Inside the Third Reich] you cannot stop representing yourself ever more radically as a criminal for whom twenty years in prison was "too little"? ... there appears to be a vast and incomprehensible discrepancy between your humble confessions and your present way of life. For the former would lead one to expect a Speer in sackcloth and ashes; I, however, know you as a merry fellow who undertakes one lovely journey after another and who happily regales his old chums with tales of his literary and financial successes ... [Y]our accusations against your former colleagues (Göring, Goebbels, Bormann, etc.) who, being dead, cannot defend themselves are agony to me ... I hope and think that the day will come when you will no longer find it necessary to confess your guilt to all and sundry in order to persuade yourself of your virtue.

Wolters concluded his letter with a suggestion that they avoid seeing each other in future, a suggestion with which Speer concurred. In spite of this, Wolters' wife Erika remained close friends with Margarete Speer, Albert Speer's wife. The two men had Christmas presents delivered to each other every year (Wolters sent Speer a ham, while receiving a pot of honey). Speer admitted that because he had had few friends, the estrangement hurt.

In 1975, Wolters attempted a reconciliation, sending Speer a letter for his seventieth birthday in March. Speer responded emotionally, pledging to come visit Wolters at the slightest hint. Speer wrote again two months later, telling Wolters that "despite all inherent contradictions, I am very attached to you". Nevertheless, the two men never met again.

Even in Speer's second book of memoirs, Spandau: The Secret Diaries, Wolters' name is not mentioned, and his hometown is changed; the text refers to him as Speer's "Coburg friend". Speer sent Wolters a copy of the book anyway, though Speer stated that he thought it likely that Wolters would let it sit in his bookcase unread. Wolters responded sarcastically in a letter which he signed, "Duke of Coburg," "I forgive you for not 'localizing' me in the diaries after your modest restraint in [Inside the Third Reich]. The author of the [Chronik], the temporary 'best friend', and the indefatigable contact for Spandau remains nonexistent."

== Later life and death ==
Wolters bequeathed his papers to the Federal Archives, ensuring the record would be corrected one day. However, in late 1979, Speer was approached by Matthias Schmidt, a doctoral student, who sought answers to a number of questions for use in preparing his thesis. After answering Schmidt's questions, Speer referred Schmidt to Wolters for further information. Wolters took a liking to Schmidt, and showed him both the original Chronik and the correspondence in which Wolters had informed Speer of the censoring of the record. When confronted by Schmidt with this information, Speer both denied knowledge of the censorship and stated that the correspondence was not genuine. While Speer pledged not to take legal action against Schmidt for using the disputed papers (after obtaining his doctorate, Schmidt published his thesis as a book, Albert Speer: The End of a Myth), he made no such promise regarding Wolters. Speer published a formal revocation of a power of attorney he had given Wolters while in Spandau and disputed on legal grounds Wolters' right to the Chronik and other papers. The dispute was only ended by Speer's sudden death in London in September 1981.

Wolters died in January 1983 after a long illness. According to his son Fritz, his final word was "Albert". He had donated many of his papers to the Archives in 1982; after Wolters died, Riesser, as his literary executor, donated the remainder.

== Books in German ==
- Spezialist in Sibirien, Berlin: Wendt & Matthes Verlag, 1933.
- Die Neue Reichskanzlei : Architekt Albert Speer, with Heinrich Wolff. Munich: Zentralverlag der NSDAP, 1940.
- Neue deutsche Baukunst, with Albert Speer. Berlin: Volk und Reich, 1943.
- Albert Speer, Oldenburg: Stalling, 1943.
- Vom Beruf des Baumeisters, Berlin: Volk und Reich, 1944.
- Coesfeld Fragen und Antworten eines Städtebauers, Coesfeld: Kreisverwaltung, 1974.
- Stadtmitte Berlin, Tübingen: Wasmuth, 1978. ISBN 978-3-8030-0130-6
