= Albert Speer (born 1934) =

German architect and urban planner (1934–2017)

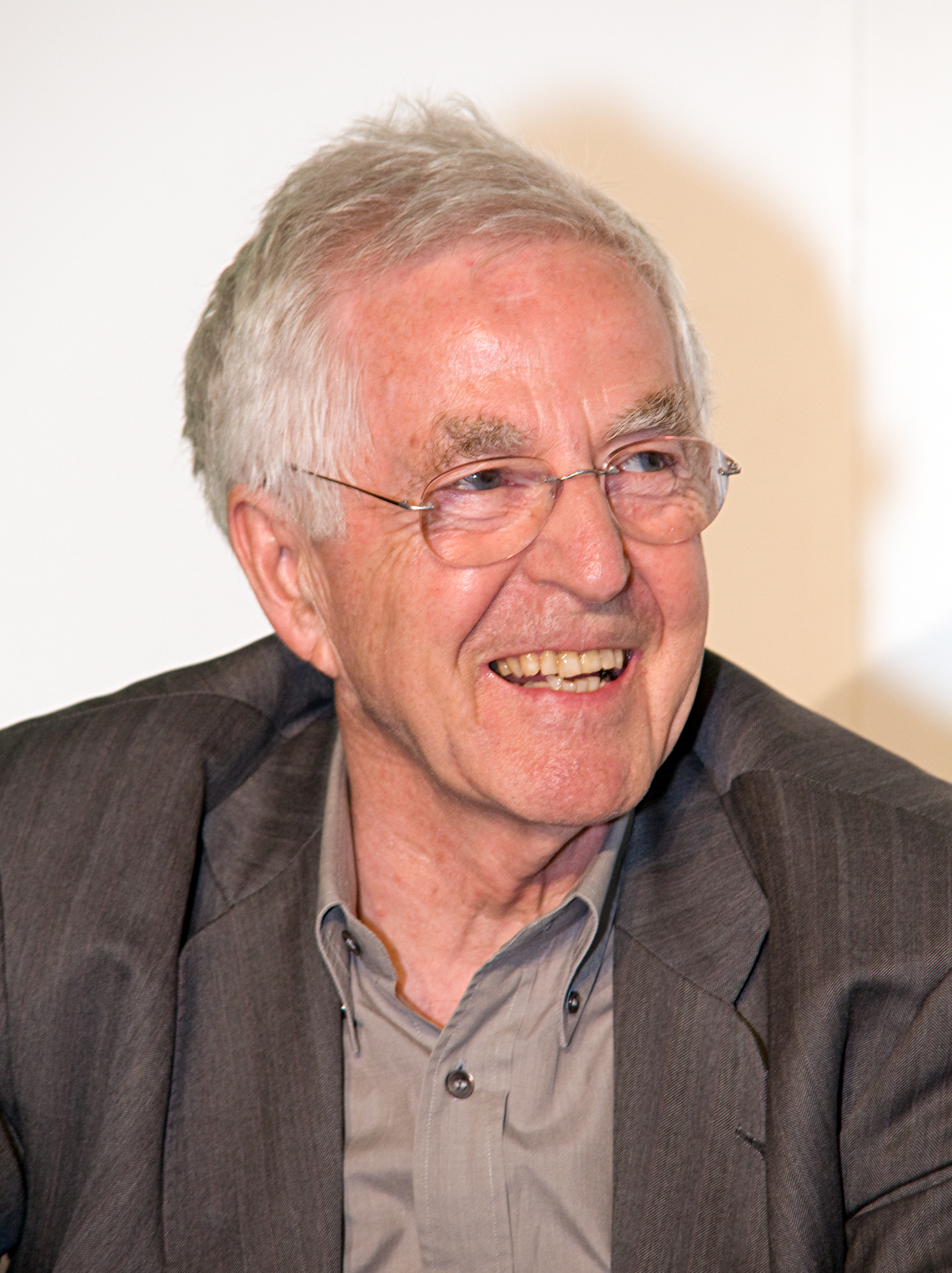
- Speer in 2010
- Born: 29 July 1934; Berlin, Nazi Germany
- Died: 15 September 2017 (aged 83); Frankfurt am Main, Germany
- Occupation: Architect
- Parents: Albert Speer (father); Margarete Weber (mother)

Albert Speer Jr. (German pronunciation: [ˈʃpeːɐ̯]; 29 July 1934 – 15 September 2017) was a German architect and urban planner. He was the son of Albert Speer (1905–1981), Adolf Hitler's chief architect before assuming the Office of Minister of Armaments and War Production for Germany during World War II. His grandfather, Albert Friedrich Speer, was also an architect.

== Early life and education ==
Speer (age 6) holding Hitler's hand in August 1940 at the Berghof.

Speer was born on 29 July 1934 in Berlin, Germany, to Albert Speer and Margarete Weber as their first child. He had five younger siblings: Hilde (born 1936), Friedrich (born 1937), Margret (born 1938), Adolf (name later changed to Arnold; born 1940) and Ernst (born 1942). For his first year of life, the Speer family lived in a Berlin apartment until Speer Sr. designed a new home. Speer Jr. later became responsible for paying off the mortgage after World War II. From 1936 onwards, Speer Sr. became increasingly busy as he became more involved with Hitler's government. In his post-war memoirs, he admitted to neglecting Margarete and his children. Despite Speer Jr.'s attempts to distance himself from his father's Nazi legacy, he has occasionally spoken about his childhood under Nazi Germany. At some point, the Speer family lived in Bavaria near Hitler's residence at Berghof where Speer Jr. spent an hour each day walking to school. As a child, he viewed his visits to the Berghof positively as a happy occasion where he was given sweets and allowed to play with dogs. He also viewed Hitler as a "nice uncle" when he was a boy.

After the war, the Speer children lived with Margarete's family in Heidelberg whilst Speer Sr. was arrested. Speer Jr. was 12-years old when his father was sentenced at the Nuremberg Trials in 1946 to twenty years of imprisonment for war crimes and crimes against humanity. Due to the stress felt at the time, Speer developed a severe stutter. Although his father was imprisoned in Spandau, Speer Sr. opened a bank account through Rudolf Wolters to support his family and his children's education. In 1953, Speer Sr. specified that Speer Jr. and his three eldest siblings should receive 12 marks per week; by 1954 this was increased to 22 marks per week. Wolters acted as a surrogate father figure to the Speer children. When Speer Jr. was studying in Munich, Wolters (an architect) offered him a job in Düsseldorf so he could practice.

In March 1955, Speer failed to attain the Abitur due to him falling ill with influenza, missing some schooling after World War II, and also undertaking a carpentry apprenticeship. Although a setback for trying to attain higher education, he attended night schools and was sent to Bavaria on Wolters' advice so he could re-sit his exams later in the year. This time he passed and received the Abitur.By the end of 1955, Speer was enrolled in architecture at the Technical University of Munich since he was good at drawing and he wouldn't be required to speak much. He refutes the idea his father's career as an architect had anything to do with his decision. He also considered urban planning to be his main area, rather than architecture. In November 1960, Speer graduated with a Diploma in Engineering for architecture.

== Career ==
He won his first international prize in 1964, and then opened his own architect's office. He also worked in Saudi Arabia. In 1977, he became professor of urban planning at the University of Kaiserslautern in the state of Rheinland-Palatinate. His firm (Albert Speer & Partner) has had an office in Shanghai since 2001.

In 1984, he founded the company Büro Albert Speer & Partner in Frankfurt am Main. He was responsible for the design of Expo 2000 in Hanover, design of the Shanghai International Automobile City, and the central axis in Beijing created while serving as lead designer for the 2008 Olympics. Speer was part of the architectural firm involved in Munich's bid for the 2018 Winter Olympics, and in the 2022 FIFA World Cup in Qatar.

He died on 15 September 2017 at the age of 83 in Frankfurt am Main, Germany, after complications with a surgery performed after falling in his home.

=== Saudi Arabia ===
In the Saudi Arabian capital of Riyadh, Speer and his firm drew up designs for the city's Diplomatic Quarter in collaboration with Richard Bödeker in the 1970s. Speer's interest in Saudi Arabia was shaped by Jürgen Frauenfeld, one of Speer's early partners, who made several visits to the country. In an international competition for designs of the Diplomatic Quarter, Speer's firm was awarded first prize for its design of the quarter in addition to staff housing for the Ministry of Foreign Affairs. Both projects became an all-German consortium primarily between Speerplan (the former name for AS+P), Heinle Wischer & Partner, and Bödeker und the Rhein-Ruhr Ingenieurgesellschaft mbH. The site of the quarter was sat on the city's boundaries closer to the desert near the Wadi Hanifa. Although Speer said the quarter was built using morphological elements from traditional Arab cities - particularly Nadji architecture - many of its features are inherently Western and contemporary. The original master plan was developed by Speer's firm in 1978 and in 2005 the group made revisions to address new requirements. Speer designed the district around a core district of government and diplomatic buildings flanked by residential clusters primarily located on two boulevards.

Speer's work on the quarter left a favourable impression, and Speer's firm continued to involve itself with Saudi Arabia through a series of projects including King Abdullah Bin Abdulaziz Road and the Criminal Court Complex in 2014.

=== Anting New Town ===
In 2001, AS+P designed Anting New Town as a satellite town of Shanghai in China as part of the One City, Nine Towns initiative. Anting is characterised by its German design and architecture as a residential district typical of Germany, with buildings built in the Bauhaus style. Originally, the Chinese developers sought a clichéd stereotypically medieval German town in the same manner of other Chinese replicas of European cities. However, Speer and his partners managed to convince them to allow them to design a model district that represented modern Germany. The town, however, proved to be largely desolate by 2011 due to poor infrastructure. Johannes Dell, who worked for AS+P, said that Speer would never accept another contact for a model city after working on Anting. Anting is located near a Volkswagen plant and in 2007 Speer denounced the idea that Anting would become an "autostadt" (automobile city) similar to the Autostadt at Wolfsburg. The masterplan for Anting New Town was developed by Speer and Dell.

=== Qatari stadiums ===
In relation to Qatar's bid for the 2022 Fifa World Cup, Speer and his firm became involved in designing stadiums in Doha. When designing stadiums, Speer sought to shift from the traditional German notion of having stadiums away from city centres by designing stadiums with the intention of them become part of the local communities.

== Relationship with his father ==
As with the other children of Nazi officials, such as Gudrun Himmler and Edda Göring, Speer had to approach the topic of his father's infamy. While Himmler would attempt to rehabilitate her father's image, and Göring tried her best to avoid speaking about it at all, Speer said that he "tried his whole life to separate himself from his father". He is credited with being one of the few children of Nazi leaders to recognize the wrongs of their parent. Speer said that, as a child, his father "was not the kind of father who went over your homework", referring to inattentiveness and mild neglect. In Martin Kitchen's biography of Speer Sr. (Speer: Hitler's Architect), Speer Sr. said he dreaded visits from his children since he felt he had nothing to say beyond asking about school and their mother. After Speer Sr. was released in 1966, Speer Jr. showed him one of his first designs of buildings: a small wooden home he built near Munich on a lake's edge. Speer Sr. was dismissive, telling his son that it was a “waste of money.” On his failure to re-establish himself as an architect, Speer Sr. rationalised it as trying to avoid spoiling Speer Jr.'s career.

Speer has also worked to separate himself from his father's legacy and has said he doesn't enjoy talking about the subject. In 2010, he told Süddeutsche Zeitung "I have spent my entire life trying to differentiate myself from my father," and criticized journalists for failing to respect his efforts. Despite his efforts, his career was often complicated by parentage and name. In a 1999 interview with Der Spiegel, Speer noted that it was hard for him to gain commissions in Berlin - saying that he understood "that people don't want the world to hear that ‘Albert Speer' is building in Berlin.” When it was announced in March 2017 that his firm was involved in planning a new stadium for Hertha BSC in Berlin, comparisons were made to Speer Sr. who worked on the team's current stadium (the Olympiastadion) for the 1936 Olympics. Speer has particularly received attention for his willingness to work and design for authoritarian governments such as Saudi Arabia, Azerbaijan and China. On the matter, his guideline has been that “Germans should be able to work in countries with a German embassy." He argued that his primary goal was primarily to improve the lives of people regardless of what political system the country had.

Still, Speer Jr. has said he did not hate his father and considered him "a good architect, much more modern than people think today". In an interview with Süddeutsche Zeitung, he asked how “can you despise your own father?” He participated in a 2005 documentary, Speer und Er, on his father.
