= Albert Friedrich Speer =

German architect (1863–1947)

- Born: 6 May 1863; Dortmund, Province of Westphalia, Kingdom of Prussia
- Died: 31 March 1947 (aged 83); Heidelberg, Allied-occupied Germany
- Occupation: Architect
- Spouse: Luise Máthilde Wilhelmine Hommel
- Children: Hermann; Albert; Ernst

Albert Friedrich Speer (6 May 1863 – 31 March 1947) was a German architect. He was the father of the architect and Nazi Germany minister Albert Speer and the grandfather of another architect of the same name.

After studies in Berlin and Munich, he started an architecture firm in Mannheim, which he ran between 1900 and 1923. His buildings are in the classical style and art nouveau. Most of his works are in Mannheim and are stylistically influenced by Art Nouveau and Neoclassical architecture.

His marriage to Luise Máthilde Wilhelmine Hommel produced three sons, among them Albert Speer. The painter Conrad Hommel was his brother-in-law, whose daughter Eva van Hoboken was his niece.
