= Margret Nissen =

German photographer (born 1938)

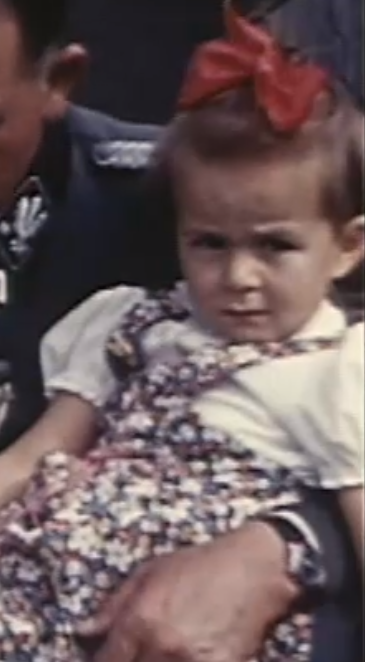
- As a child, circa 1940
- Born: Margarete Speer; 19 June 1938 (age 87)
- Occupation: Photographer
- Spouse: Hans Nissen (m. 1962)

Margret Nissen (born Margarete Speer; 19 June 1938) is a German photographer. She is a daughter of the German architect and high-ranked Nazi Party official Albert Speer (1905–1981).

Margret was named after her mother. She lived in Obersalzberg until the end of the war. After the imprisonment of her father, the family moved to Heidelberg. She studied archaeology at Ruprecht Karl University of Heidelberg. On 14 April 1962, she married the archaeologist Hans Nissen, and she took his family name. Together, they lived in Baghdad in the First Iraqi Republic from 1965 to 1967, and later lived in Chicago and Berlin. Nissen set out to become a photographer and was mainly self-taught. Since 1980, her work has primarily been shown at exhibitions in Berlin. As a photographer of architecture, she has worked at the Berlin exhibition Topographie des Terrors. She published a book about her father, Sind Sie die Tochter Speer?, in 2004.

== Literature ==
- Margret Speer: Sind Sie die Tochter Speer? Deutsche Verlags-Anstalt, München 2004.
