= Spandau: The Secret Diaries =

1975 book by Albert Speer

- Cover of the first edition
- Author: Albert Speer
- Original title: Spandauer Tagebücher
- Language: German
- Subject: Autobiography; History
- Publication date: 1975
- Media type: Print

Spandau: The Secret Diaries (German: Spandauer Tagebücher) is a 1975 book by Albert Speer. While it principally deals with Speer's time while incarcerated at Spandau Prison, it also contains much material on his role in the Third Reich and his relationship with Adolf Hitler.

== See also ==
- Inside the Third Reich

== Editions ==
- Speer, Albert (1976), Spandau: The Secret Diaries (Translated by Richard and Clara Winston), New York and Toronto: Macmillan, ISBN 978-0-02-612810-0

(Original German edition: Speer, Albert (1975), Spandauer Tagebücher [Spandau Diaries], Berlin and Frankfurt am Main: Propyläen/Ullstein, OCLC 185306869)
