= Hilde Schramm =

German politician

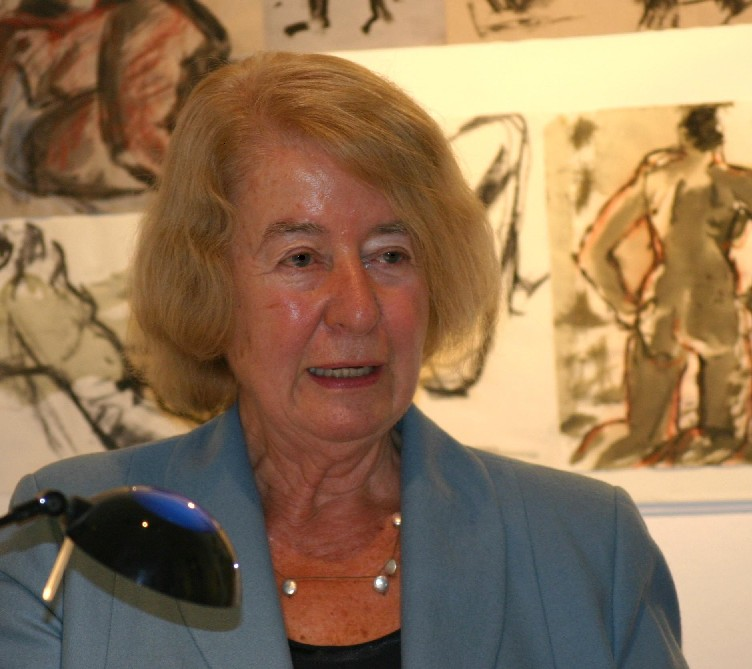
- Schramm in 2012
- Born: Hilde Speer; 17 April 1936 (age 89)
- Occupation: Politician
- Parents: Albert Speer (father); Margarete Weber (mother)

Hilde Schramm (née Speer; born 17 April 1936) is a German politician for Alliance 90/The Greens. Internationally, she is best known as the daughter of the German architect and high-ranked Nazi Party official Albert Speer (1905–1981), and the younger sister of Albert Speer Jr. (1934–2017).

== Biography ==
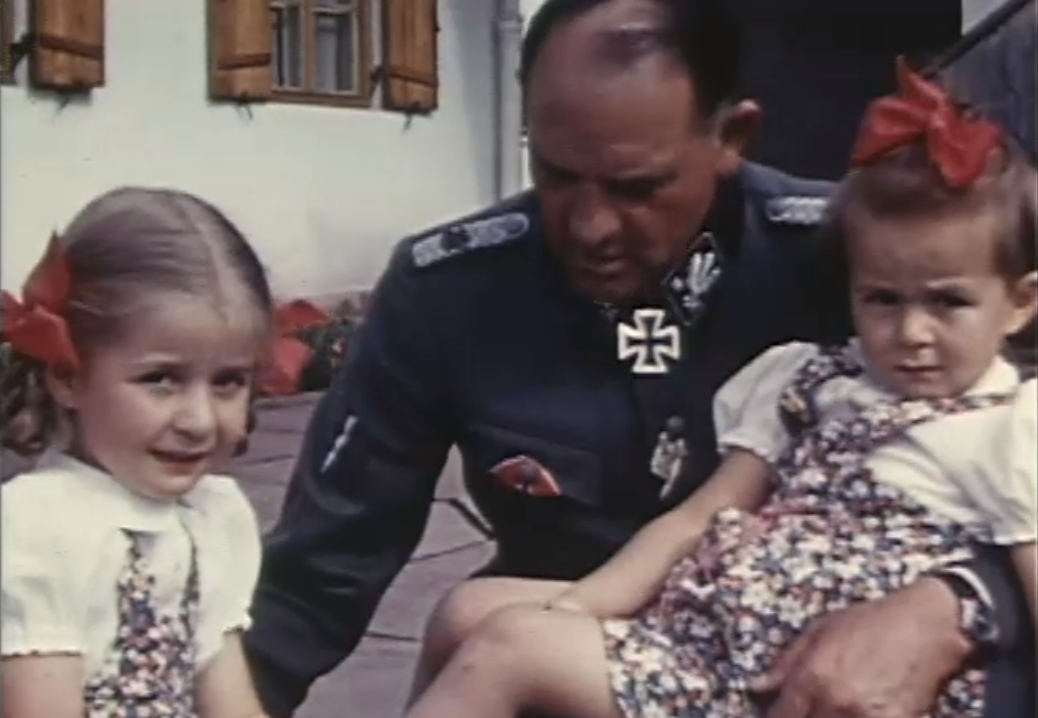
Schramm (left) at Hitler's country house, the Berghof, in 1940. SS officer Josef "Sepp" Dietrich with sister Margret on his lap. Photo by Eva Braun.

As a teenager, Schramm was awarded an American Field Service scholarship to study in the United States. The US government initially refused her a visa, but reversed its decision in the face of publicity, including offers of hospitality from several families (some of them Jewish).

Schramm became a prominent European political figure who distinguished herself for helping victims of antisemitism and Nazi atrocities. In 1994, she was awarded the Moses Mendelssohn Award from Berlin for her work. Schramm is active in politics, and has been a leader of the Green Party in Berlin. She served as member of the Berlin House of Representatives from 1985 to 1987 and 1989 to 1991 and its vice president between 1989 and 1990.

Schramm had a lengthy correspondence with her father while he was in Spandau Prison, from which he was released in October 1966.
