= Hotel Berlin, Berlin =

Hotel in Berlin, Germany

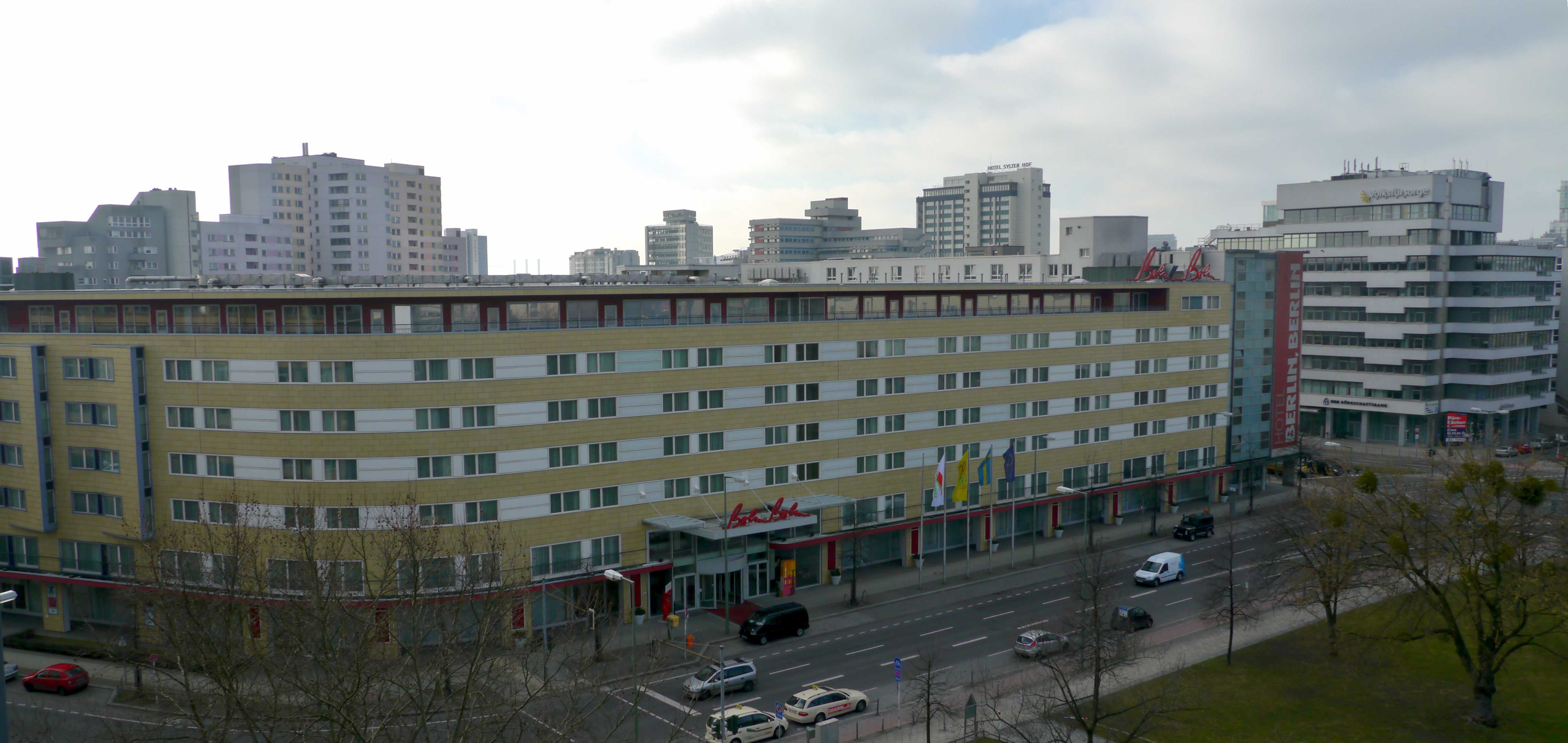

- Location in Berlin

General information
- Location: Lützowplatz, Berlin, Germany
- Coordinates: 52°30′13″N 13°21′8″E

Other information
- Number of rooms: 701

Hotel Berlin, Berlin is a historic 4-star hotel in Berlin, Germany, located in the Berlin district of Tiergarten (district center) at Lützowplatz. It is one of the largest hotels in Germany with 701 rooms.
