= Bombing of Friedrichshafen in World War II =

Friedrichshafen World War II bombings
- Part of Strategic bombing campaign in Europe
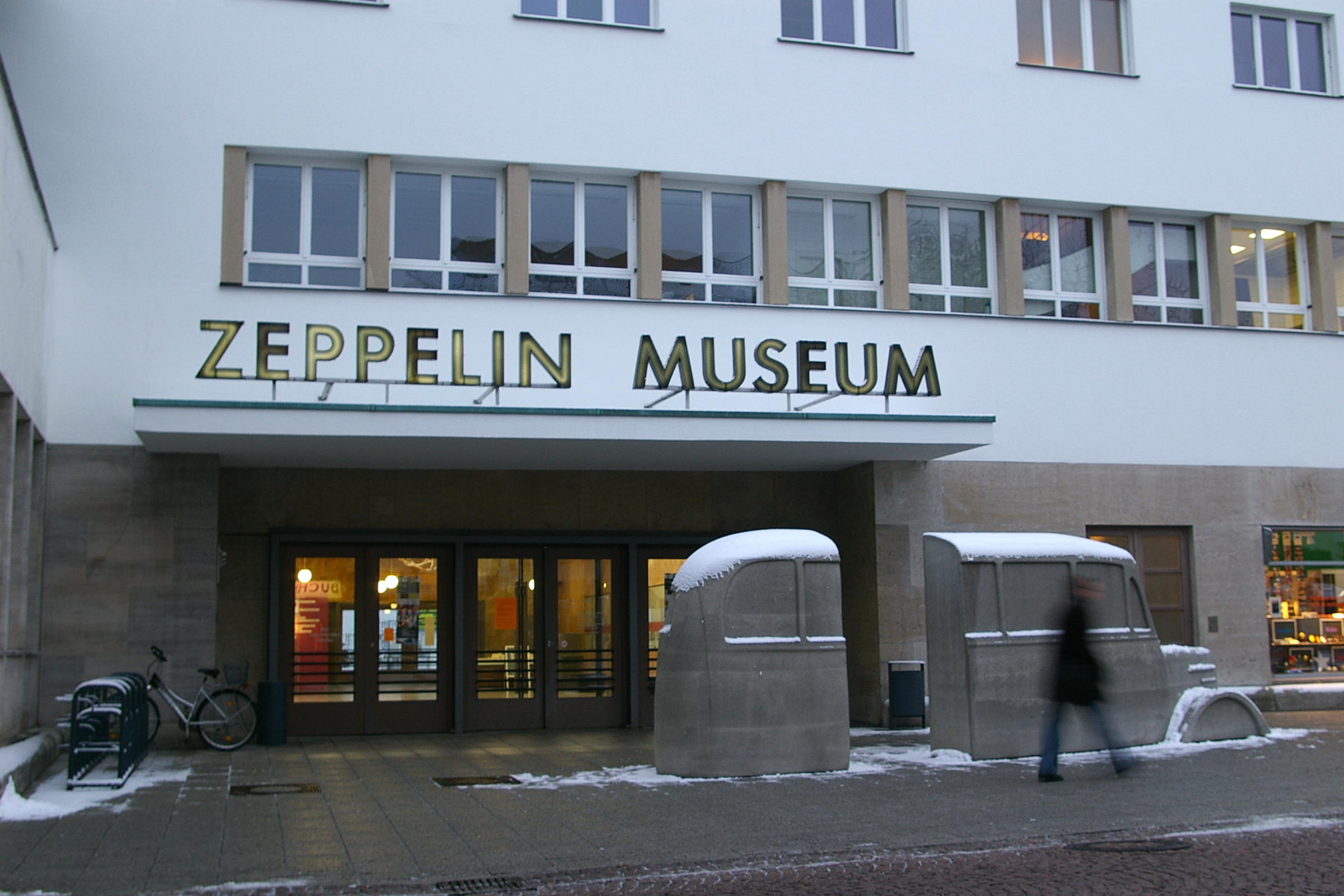
- Zeppelin Museum Friedrichshafen
Date	1944-1945
Location	Lake Constance district

Belligerents
(United States) Fifteenth Air Force (United Kingdom) RAF Bomber Command	(Nazi Germany) Luftwaffe (Defence of the Reich)

Commanders and leaders
Carl Spaatz; Arthur Harris	

The German city of Friedrichshafen was bombed during World War II as part of the Allied strategic bombing campaign against German war materiel industry, particularly in the targeting of German fighter aircraft production and long range missile development.

== Background ==
Friedrichshafen lies in the Bodenseekreis district on Lake Constance in the extreme south of Germany, and at the time it was at the edge of the German nightfighter defences. Targets included the Dornier Flugzeugwerke aircraft works at Manzell, the Maybach tank engine factory, the Luftschiffbau Zeppelin aircraft works and its Oberraderach test facility near Raderach, and the Zahnradfabrik Friedrichshafen (literally "gearwheel factory Friedrichshafen") tank gearbox factory.

In February 1944 an underground factory at Immenstaad near Friedrichshafen was suspected to be a synthetic oil and/or liquid oxygen plant. Near Überlingen, forced labor of concentration camp prisoners in the Goldbach Tunnels, KZ Nebenlager Raderach and the Aufkirch subcamp of Dachau concentration camp was used for constructing an underground facility for armament manufacturing (code name "Magnesit") safe from Allied air raids. A second facility (codenamed "Richard I") was established under Radobýl mountain in Central Bohemia.

== Attacks ==
Chronology
Date	Target	Notes
17 August 1942	Zeppelin Works	Allied intelligence had suspected the Zeppelin Works (German: Luftschiffbau Zeppelin GmbH) was involved with the V-2 rocket.
20 June 1943	Zeppelin Works	Operation Bellicose targeted suspected Würzburg radar production at Friedrichshafen. (In early June, a CIU photo interpreter (Claude Wavell) had identified a stack of ribbed baskets--Würzburg radar reflectors—at the Zeppelin Works, Winston Churchill had reviewed the photos on June 14, and No. 5 Group RAF received attack orders on June 16.) The bombing hit the Zeppelin Works' V-2 production which had only produced a few V-2 tanks and fuselage sections by 20 June.
27-28 April 1944	ZF Friedrichshafen	A night attack by 322 heavy bombers damaged several factories and destroyed the factory producing tank gearboxes. 1,234 tons of bombs were dropped causing (an estimated) 67 percent of the town's built-up area to be destroyed.
20 July 1944	Zeppelin Works	The 485 BG bombed Luftschiffbau Zeppelin. V-2 production planned for Zeppelin had already been moved to the Mittelwerk after the 1943 British bombing raid on the Peenemünde Army Research Center.
28 July 1944	Dornier Flugzeugwerke	The 464 BG bombed the Manzell aircraft works.
3 August 1944	Oberraderach & ZF Friedrichshafen	Oberraderach (primary target) and the Zahnradfabrik secondary target were bombed. As early as 20 September 1942 Albert Speer had warned Hitler of the critical importance of Friedrichshafen tank plants and Schweinfurt ball-bearing plants.
16 August 1944	Oberraderach	The 485 BG bombed the Ober chemical works.
25 February 1945	Maybach tank factory	Mission 847: 377 B-17s are sent to hit the Maybach tank factory at Friedrichshafen (63) using Gee-H. Maybach Motorenbau (Friedrichshafen) and Norddeutsche Motorenbau (Berlin) produced nearly all tank engines.
