= Rüstungsstab =

- (Armament Staff)

Agency overview
- Formed: August 1, 1944
- Preceding agency: Jägerstab (Fighter Staff)
- Dissolved: May 8, 1945
- Jurisdiction: V-2 rocket program Heinkel He 162 fighter aircraft production
- Agency executives: Albert Speer Karl Saur
- Parent agency: Reich Ministry of Armaments and War Production

Rüstungsstab (Armament Staff) was a Nazi German governmental task force whose aim was to increase production of military equipment and munitions during the final year of World War II. Established in August 1944 on the basis of the Jägerstab (Fighter Staff), it was composed of government and SS personnel, as well as representatives of the armament manufacturers.

Jägerstab played a key role in the exploitation of slave labour for the benefit of Germany's industry and its armed forces, the Wehrmacht. The task force supported the Luftwaffe's Emergency Fighter Program, including the development of the "people's jet", Heinkel He 162.

== Background and formation ==
The Jägerstab (Fighter Staff) was established on 1 March 1944 by the order of Albert Speer, the Minister of Armaments and War Production in the Hitler Cabinet, with support from Erhard Milch of the Reich Aviation Ministry. Its goal was to increase the production of fighter aircraft to counteract the Allied campaign of strategic bombing. Speer and Milch played a key role in directing the activities of the agency, however, the day-to-day operations were handled by Chief of Staff Karl Saur, the head of the Technical Office in the Armaments Ministry.

The Jägerstab had been given extraordinary powers over labour, production and transportation resources. The task force immediately began implementing plans to expand the use of slave labour in the aviation industry. The progress achieved through the work of the Jägerstab was seen as a success by the German authorities. The cooperation between the Reich Ministry of Aviation, the Ministry of Armaments and the SS proved especially productive. Although intended to function for only six months, already in late May Speer and Milch discussed with Goring the possibility of centralising all of Germany's arms manufacturing under a similar task force. On 1 August 1944, Speer reorganised the task force into the Rüstungsstab (Armament Staff) to apply the same model of operation to all top-priority armament programs. Karl Saur stayed on as chief of staff.

== Activities and results ==
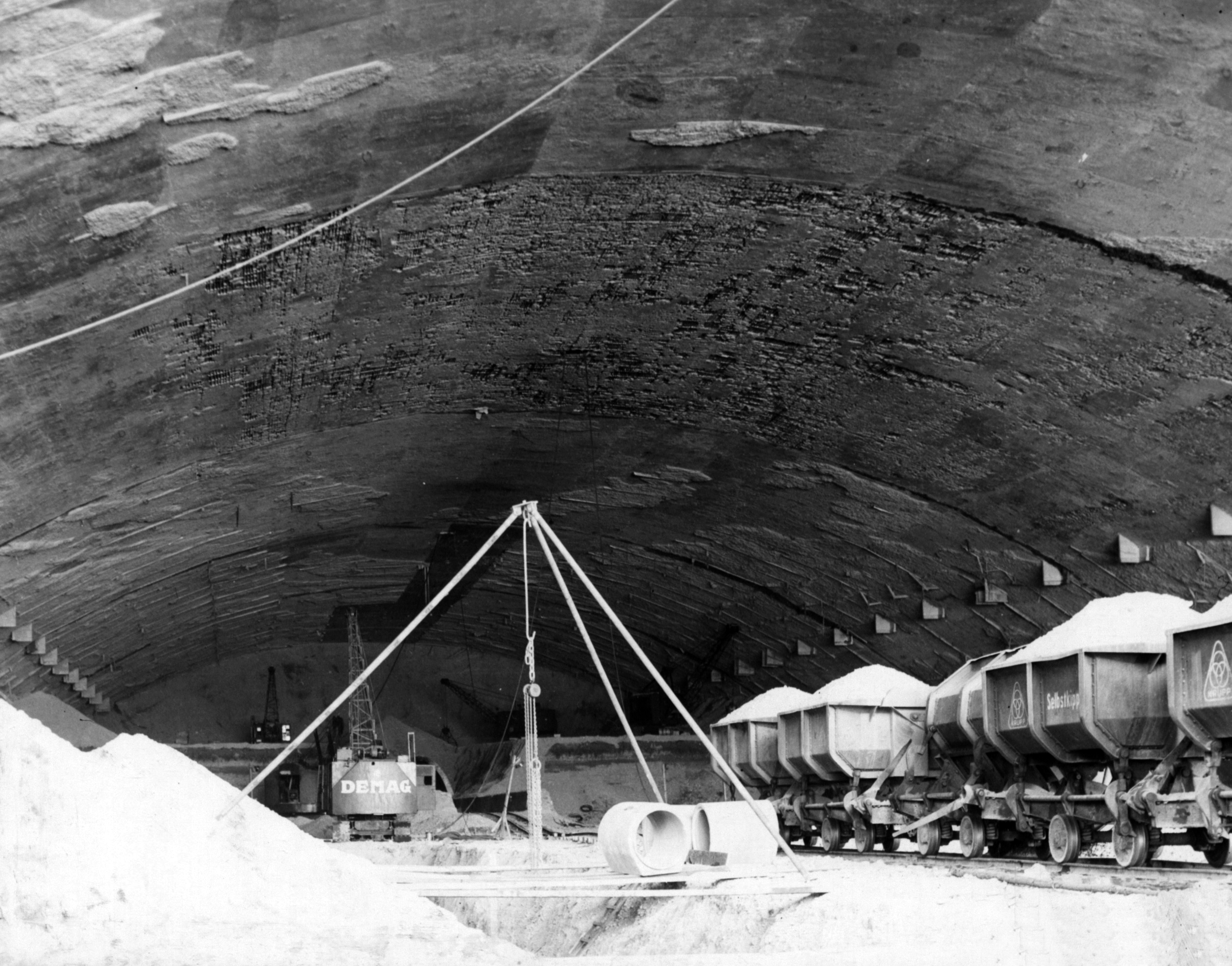
Internal view of the planned underground factory, Weingut I, one of Jägerstab's projects, as found by the U.S. Army in 1945.

The formation of the Rüstungsstab allowed Speer, for the first time, to consolidate key arms manufacturing projects for the three branches of the Wehrmacht under the authority of his ministry, further marginalising the Reich Ministry of Aviation. Several departments, including the once powerful Technical Office, were disbanded or transferred to the new task force.

The organisation of the task force was further streamlined in October 1944, by combining Airframes Main Committee and Equipment Main Committee into the Aircraft Construction Main Committee under Karl Frydag. The committee in turn was subdivided into four key task forces: single-piston engine fighter aircraft; jet fighters; bombers and special aircraft. In this capacity, Frydag oversaw the day-to-day development and production activities relating to the He 162, the Volksjäger ("people's fighter"), as part of the Emergency Fighter Program.

The task force continued the Jägerstab's work on the fighter aircraft, which by then were being produced in sufficient numbers. By the autumn of 1944, however, the Luftwaffe (air force) lacked trained pilots to operate them. In November 1944, Colonel Gordon Gollob, at the time the leader of day fighters, noted that the air force lacked fuel to be able to train pilots. Speer acknowledged the problem in a December 1944 speech at a test facility, by teasing Adolf Galland, the Inspector of Fighters, with a joke that the Armaments industry had "won the first round" and that he fully expected the Luftwaffe to win the next.

The Rüstungsstab assumed responsibilities for the underground transfer projects of the Jägerstab. In November 1944, 1.8 million square meters of underground space were ready for occupancy, encompassing over 1,000 spaces commissioned by the task force. According to the historian Marc Buggeln, the Rüstungsstab played a key role in maintaining and increasing production of fighter aircraft and V-2 rockets.
