= Überlingen-Aufkirch concentration camp =

Subcamp of the Dachau Nazi concentration camp (1944-45)

Überlingen-Aufkirch
- Nazi concentration camp
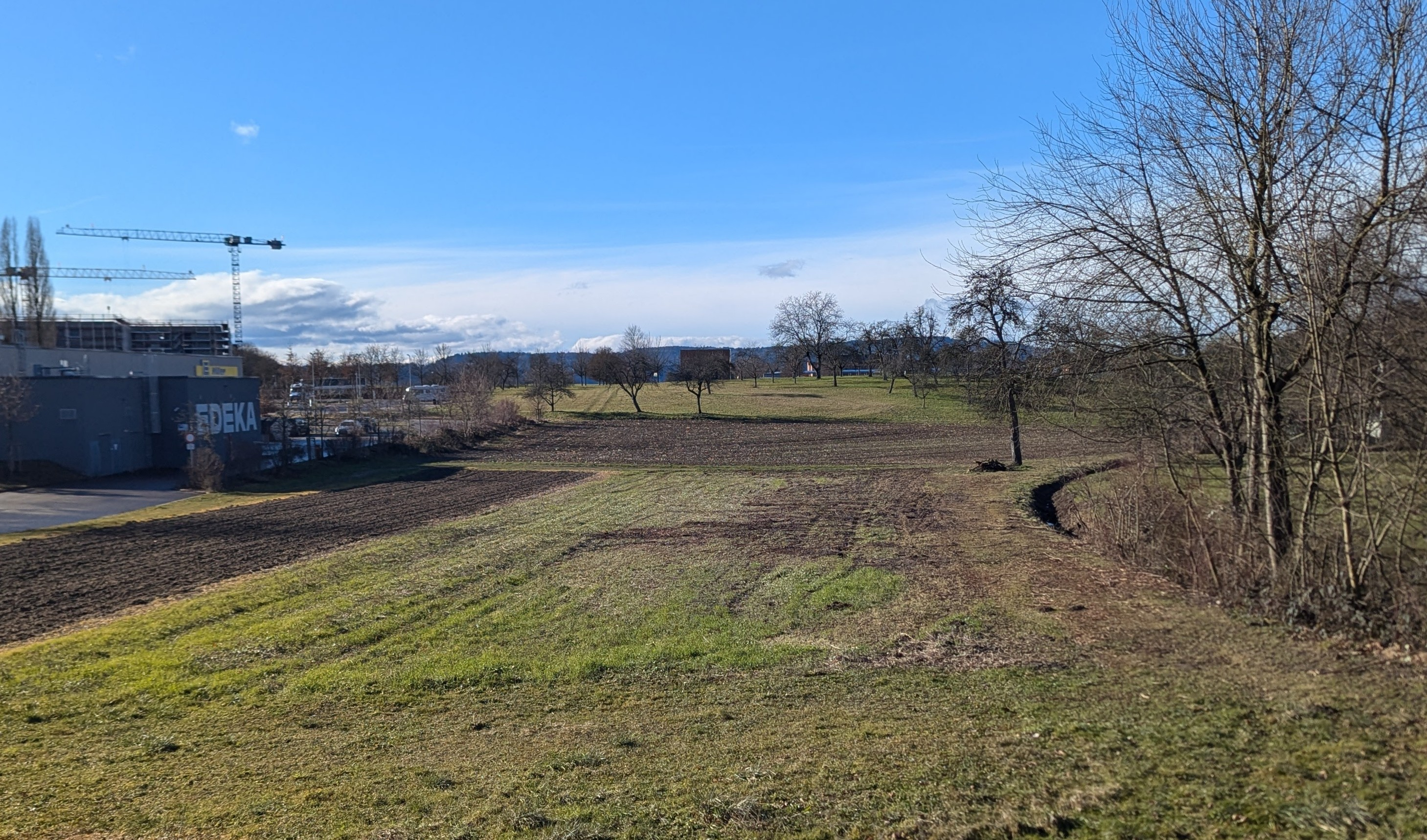
- The site of the former Überlingen-Aufkirch camp

- Location within Germany
- Coordinates: 47°46′36″N 9°9′2″E
- Other names: German: Konzentrationslager- (KZ) Außerlager Überlingen-Aufkirch
- Location: Überlingen, Germany
- Built by: Germany
- Operated by: Schutzstaffel (SS)
- Commandant: Georg Grünberg
- Operational: September 1944 – April 1945
- Killed: 170+

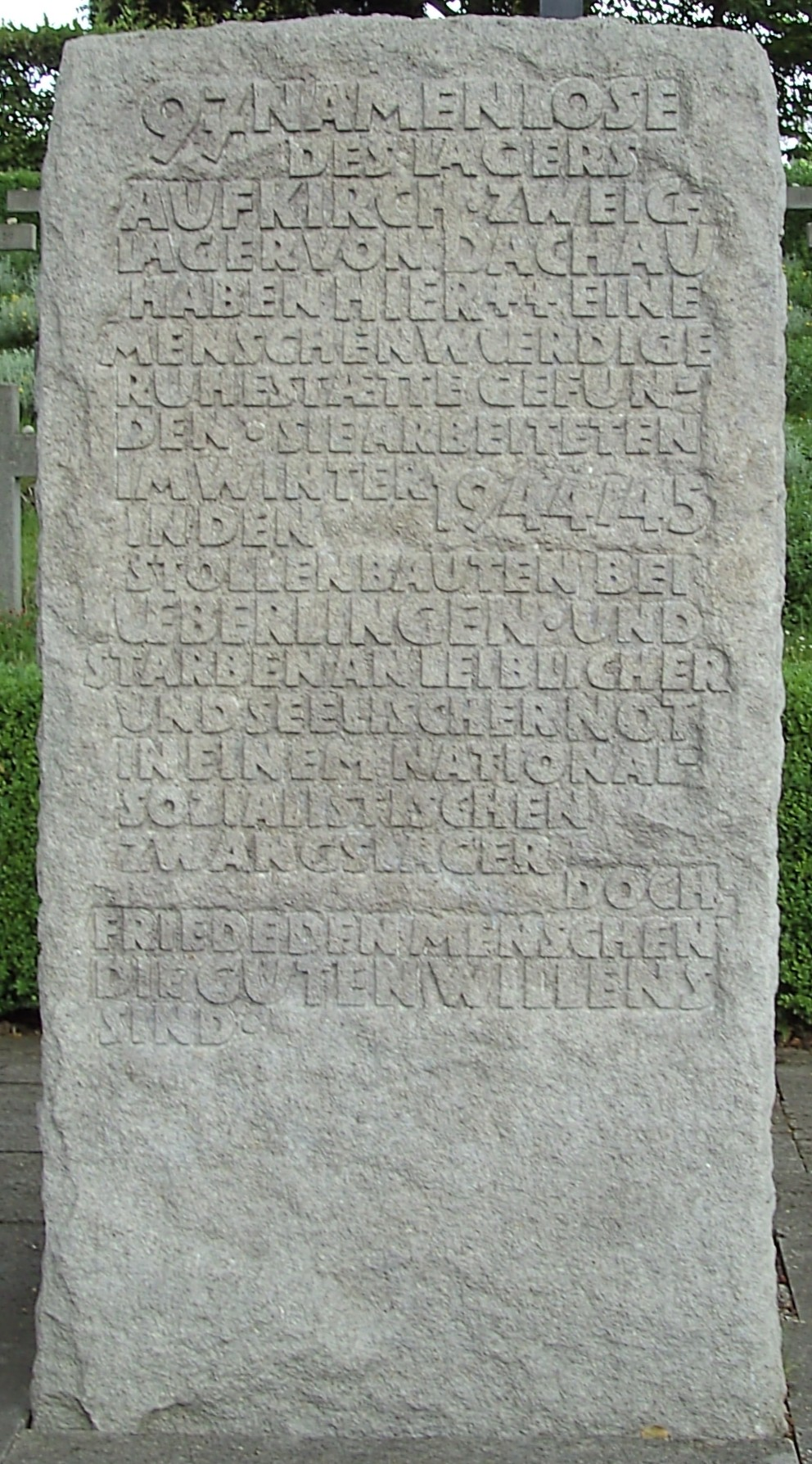
A Memorial in the camp Cemetery near Birnau

The Überlingen-Aufkirch concentration camp (German: Konzentrationslager- (KZ) Außenlager Überlingen-Aufkirch) was a subcamp of Dachau concentration camp that existed from September 1944 to April 1945. Around 700 prisoners were used to build the Goldbach Tunnels, to which armament manufacturing was to move from the existing plants in Friedrichshafen. At least 170 prisoners were killed by the SS or died due to the work and living conditions.

== History ==
The Überlingen-Aufkirch subcamp was created so that arms production could be moved from factories in Friedrichshafen to tunnels in the villages of Aufkirch and Goldbach, in the municipality of Überlingen. Starting in June 1943, the production facilities of the companies Luftschiffbau Zeppelin, Maybach-Motorenbau, Zahnradfabrik Friedrichshafen, and the Dornier-Werke increasingly became targets of allied aerial attacks, in which nearly all of the factories and much of urban Friedrichshafen were destroyed. As a result, starting in 1943 the government began an effort to move arms and weaponry production out of Friedrichshafen.

On May 1, 1944, following a devastating bombing run on Friedrichshafen that occurred 3 days prior and left 67% of the city's built up area destroyed, the Jägerstab, a subdivision of the Reich Ministry of Armaments and War Production that deals with the production of fighter aircraft ordered the construction of tunnels in Hohenems in Vorarlberg and in Überlingen. In Überlingen, the area along the Stahringen–Friedrichshafen railway line was found to be lined by molasse cliffs, a soft and easily hollowed out rock. The construction work began at the start of June 1944, with a planned duration of 100 days.

== Subcamp ==
To accelerate the construction of the tunnels, prisoners from the Dachau concentration camp were brought over. Surviving documents from the main camp first mention the Überlingen-Aufkirch subcamp on September 2, 1944. Around 700 prisoners arrived at the camp arrived in 2 transports, one in September and one on the 3rd of October. In Dachau, the prisoners were organized under the name "Obstkommando" (fruit work troop) so that the prisoners would be under the impression that they were going to Lake Constance for the cultivation of fruits.

A concentration camp was built in Überlingen, near the village of Aufkirch. The camp was located around 1.5 km from the tunnel locations. The camp was made up of three barracks that held 270 prisoners each, a smaller barracks with a kitchen and medical clinic, and appellplatz, an open area where roll call was usually held. The camp, which had an area of 3600 m,² was surrounded with two parallel, 2,8 meter tall, electrically charged barbed wire fences. On the corners were 6,5 meter tall watchtowers equipped with searchlights. Outside the fence and across from the entrance were SS barracks, a dog kennel, and accommodation for the guards. Georg Grünberg was the camp commandant, who already held the same position in the Friedrichshafen subcamp. Under his command were 25 SS members, who guarded the prisoners.

The prisoners were mainly political prisoners and those classified by the SS as "criminal" or "asocial". The most common country of origin among prisoners was Italy, many of whom were military prisoners. 55 Slovenes were captured as partisans of the Osvobodilna Fronta during fighting near Ljubljana. The rest of the prisoners were mainly Russian, Polish, or German. One of the Slovenian prisoners was Boris Kobe, who following the war drew tarot cards depicting life as a prisoner.

The prisoners worked building the Goldbach Tunnels for 12 hour shifts, six days a week. The prisoners worked using pneumatic drills and jackhammers with no protective measures, and would load the material on to tipping lorries that would drive to the waterfront and dump the material in Lake Constance. During explosions, the prisoners were forbidden from retreating to the safe areas of the tunnel system. One prisoner, Anton Jež, mentioned in 1998 the rock falls that happened in the tunnels, that would often kill or severely injure prisoners. Further accidents would occur during the removal of unexploded charges. Jež described the relatively mild winter temperatures in the tunnels as a great luck for the poorly fed and clothed prisoners.

The subcamp's existence was well known in nearby Überlingen: guarded by the SS and guard dogs, the prisoners would march through the city streets when changing shifts. Some residents tried to provide the prisoners with food and medicine. Some guards tolerated it, others used kicks and dogs to prevent it. The prisoners were also supported by butcher and future member of parliament Karl Löhle, from which the prisoners would pick up meat and sausages for the camp kitchen.

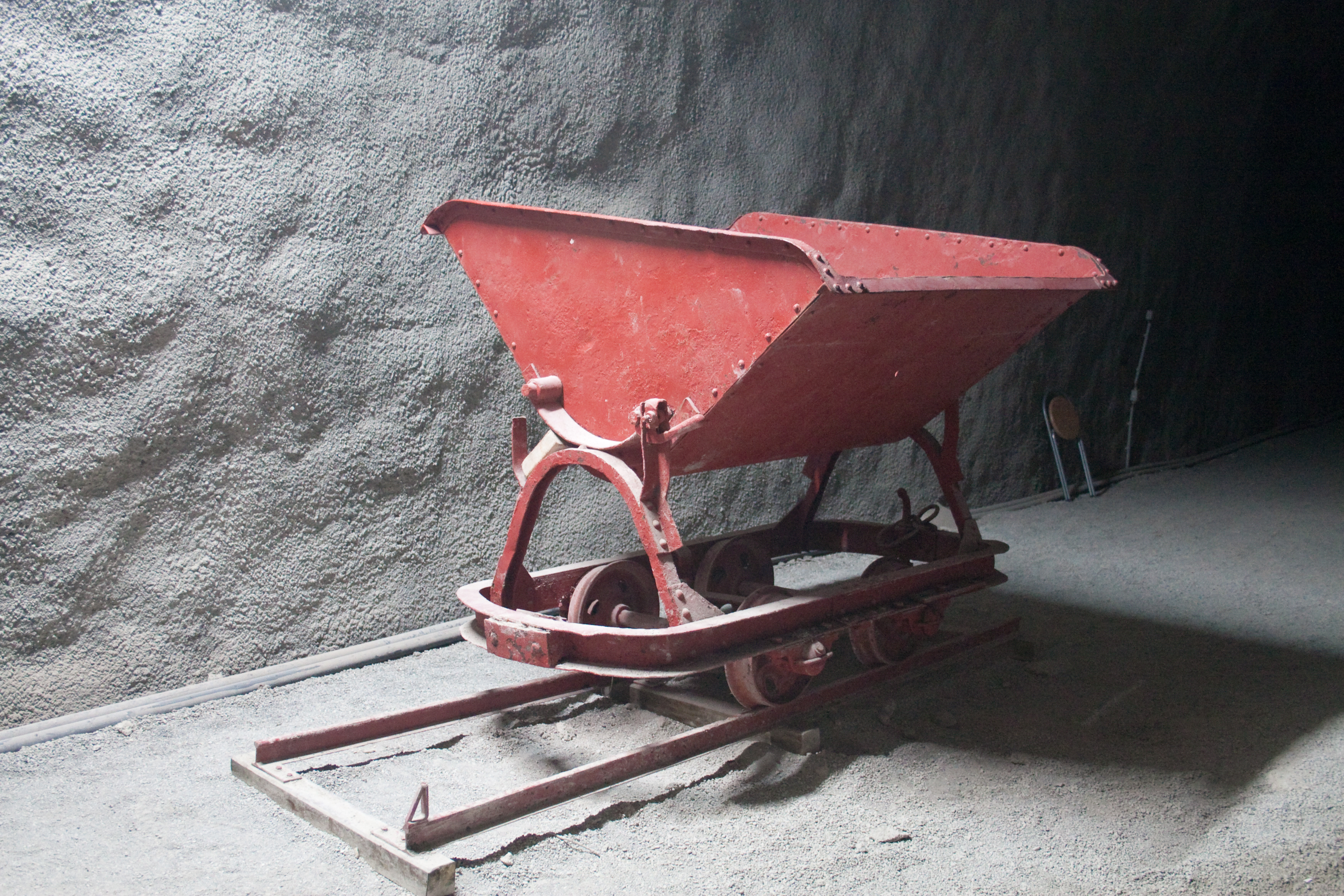
A tipping lorry on display in the Goldbach tunnels that was used to remove overburden and other excess material

On March 21, 1945, two prisoners, Ukrainian Wassili Sklarenko and Austrian Adam Puntschart successfully escaped to Schaffhausen by hiding under overburden in a tipping lorry. The other prisoners poured diesel on the lorry so as to deceive the guard dogs at the tunnel entrance. The escaped prisoners then walked to Schaffausen at night. Both said that prior to their escape, a Russian man had tried and failed to escape. Following his capture, he was pushed into the dog kennel and torn to pieces in front of the other prisoners.

According to Alfred Hübsch, a kapo at the camp, lice spread around the camp in January 1945. This led to many prisoners contracting dysentery, phlegmon, and typhus. The prisoners' blankets and straw sacks were soaked through, and the toilets and washrooms were covered with feces. There was no heating, no soap, and no towels. On April 4, Commandant Grünberg had 214 extremely ill prisoners separated and sent out by train to the Saulgau subcamp.

Eyewitnesses described those who arrived in Saulgau as "entirely emaciated, nearly starved, and completely lice-ridden", as "half corpses" and "doomed to die". Hübsch described the effects of the camp conditions on the prisoners:

"The terrible distress, the cold, the hunger, the vermin, the exhaustion, the diseases, the envy towards those receiving packages, all that was almost unbearable, the fear of contagion, the thought of dying just before the soon-to-be-hoped-for liberation troops of General de Gaulle […] – all this drove people mad, hysterical, hard, evil, and uncomradely. Everyone became the enemy of the other."

== Degenhardt Forest Mass Grave ==
It is unknown exactly how many prisoners died in Überlingen. A minimum number of 170 is known because of 2 burials at the Überlingen cemetery, 71 bodies that were cremated in Constance, and 97 bodies that were found after the war in a mass grave in the Degenhardt Forest, southeast of the village of Andelshofen. A memorial at the location commemorates the dead prisoners with the following inscription:

„IN DIESEM WALDSTÜCK WURDEN 97 HÄFTLINGE AUS DEM KZ AUFKIRCH/ÜBERLINGEN IN EINEM MASSENGRAB VERSCHARRT. SIE STARBEN IM WINTER 1944/45 BEIM BAU DES GOLDBACHER STOLLENS AN DEN FOLGEN MENSCHENVERACHTENDER BEHANDLUNG UND BEI FLUCHTVERSUCHEN: DIE TOTEN WURDEN EXHUMIERT UND AM 9. APRIL 1946 AUF DEM KZ-FRIEDHOF BIRNAU BESTATTET.“

Translated to English, it means:

"IN THIS FOREST, 97 PRISONERS FROM THE CONCENTRATION CAMP AUFKIRCH/ÜBERLINGEN WERE BURIED IN A MASS GRAVE. THEY DIED IN THE WINTER OF 1944/45 DURING THE CONSTRUCTION OF THE GOLDBACH TUNNEL AS A RESULT OF INHUMANE TREATMENT AND DURING ESCAPE ATTEMPTS. THE DEAD WERE EXHUMED AND BURIED ON APRIL 9, 1946, AT THE CONCENTRATION CAMP CEMETERY BIRNAU."

The mass grave began being used in February 1945 after cremations in Constance were stopped, presumably due to a lack of coal..

In April 1946, the French occupationary forces brought interned national socialists and former guards to recover the bodies from the mass grave. An investigation revealed that 10 of the 97 victims had fatal gunshot wounds. The others had died of weakness, starvation, abuse, or accidents while working in the tunnels. The dead were buried after a nightly vigil in the city center of Überlingen on April 9, 1946, at the newly established concentration camp cemetery Birnau, not far from the pilgrimage church Birnau. The cemetery, redesigned in 1962 by the German War Graves Commission, was the target of desecration in October 1992, during which all gravestones were overturned and a monument was defaced with swastikas. The perpetrators were caught and sentenced. Since the fall of 2001, a plaque at the cemetery has provided information about the names of the prisoners buried there, as far as they are known.

== Liberation ==
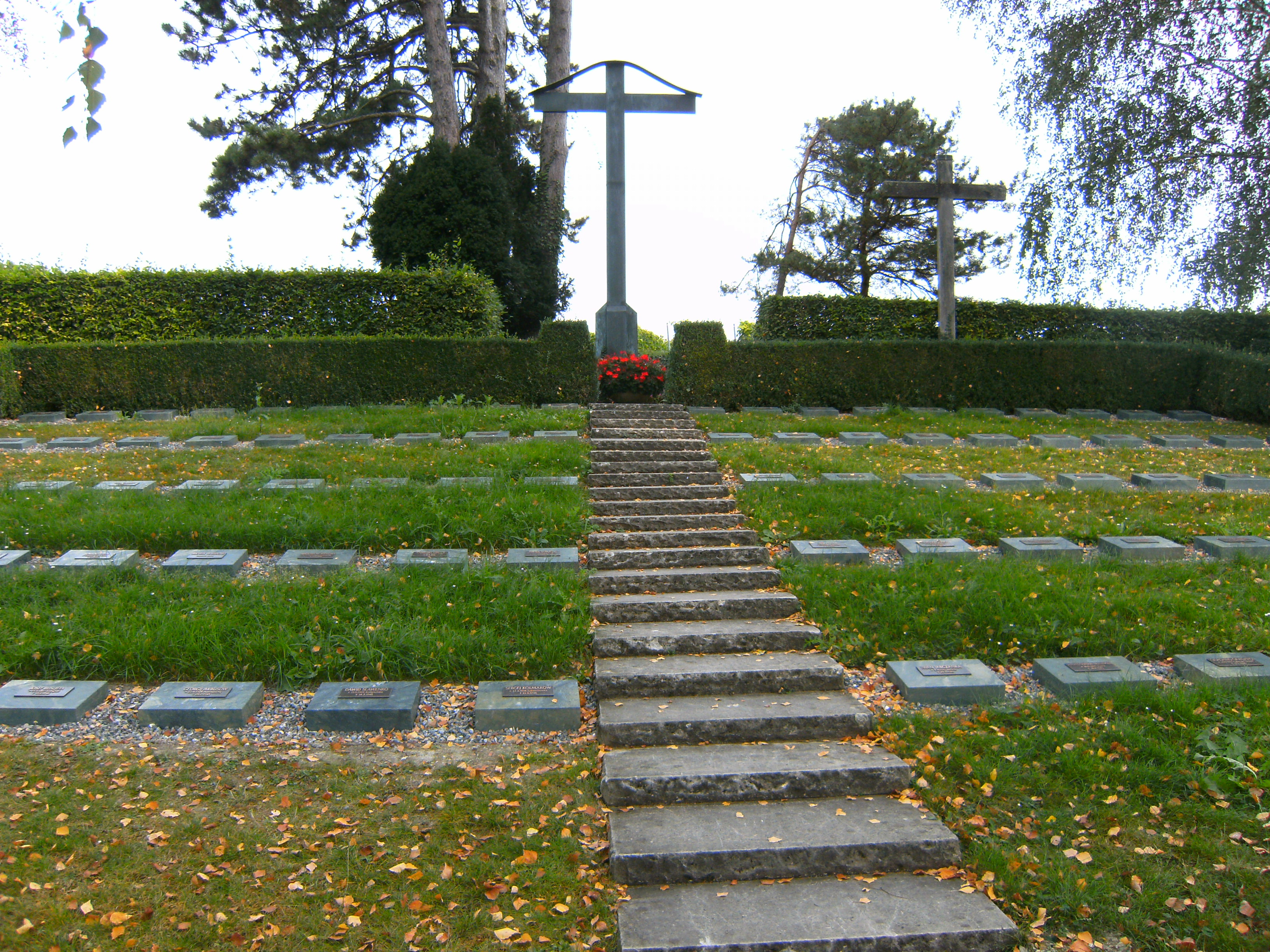
Birnau concentration camp cemetery: Graves with 2 high crosses

On April 25, 1945, units of the 1st French Army freed Überlingen. Four days prior, all of the prisoners had been evacuated by train to the München-Allach concentration camp which was reached on April 29 by American soldiers. The Überlingen fire department burned down the barracks on April 23, officially to prevent the spread of epidemics.

A guard at the camp was sentenced to death and executed in the Rastatt trials in early 1947. The German judiciary investigated commandant Grünberg in the 1950s and 60s. No charges were brought since the public prosecutor's office at Munich Regional Court II discontinued the proceedings due to "lack of reasonable suspicion" on December 13, 1965. Supported by the Central Office of the State Justice Administrations for the Investigation of National Socialist Crimes (ZStL), the public prosecutor's office in Constance conducted an extensive investigation in the 1960s into the Überlingen-Aufkirch camp. Proceedings were discontinued on November 16, 1967 by the ZStL, who concluded that the results of the investigation were not enough to indict any individual people.

The entrances to the Goldbach tunnels were demolished by the occupying French forces in 1947. A new entrance was built in the 1960s to allow maintenance work to be carried out. From 1983 to 1989, the tunnel system was renovated. Currently, the tunnels serve as winter quarters for boats and trailers. The city of Überlingen has offered regular guided tours of the caves since 1981. In 1984, the city of Überlingen erected a memorial at the entrance of the tunnels. Die Stadt Überlingen errichtete 1984 eine Gedenkstätte am Eingang des Stollens. A documentation site had been located in the tunnel since 1996. A memorial was erected near the camp location in 1993, and has been accompanied by an information board since 2001.

== Literature ==
- Oswald Burger: Der Stollen. Hrsg.: Verein Dokumentationsstätte Goldbacher Stollen und KZ Aufkirch in Überlingen e.V. 12. Auflage. Edition Isele, Eggingen 2017, ISBN 978-3-86142-087-3
- eOswald Burger: Überlingen (Aufkirch). In: Wolfgang Benz, Barbara Distel (Hrsg.): Der Ort des Terrors. Geschichte der nationalsozialistischen Konzentrationslager. Band 2: Frühe Lager, Dachau, Emslandlager. C.H. Beck, München 2005, ISBN 3-406-52962-3, S. 514–517.

== Movies ==
- Medienwerkstatt Freiburg: Unter Deutschlands Erde. Video, Freiburg im Breisgau 1983.
- Stephan Kern, Jürgen Weber: Wie Dachau an den See kam … Video, Querblick Medien- und Verlagswerkstatt, Konstanz 1995, ISBN 3-9804449-1-0
