= Goldbach Tunnels =

Tunnels near Lake Constance built by forced labour in WWII

Coordinates: 47.770560°N 9.140506°E

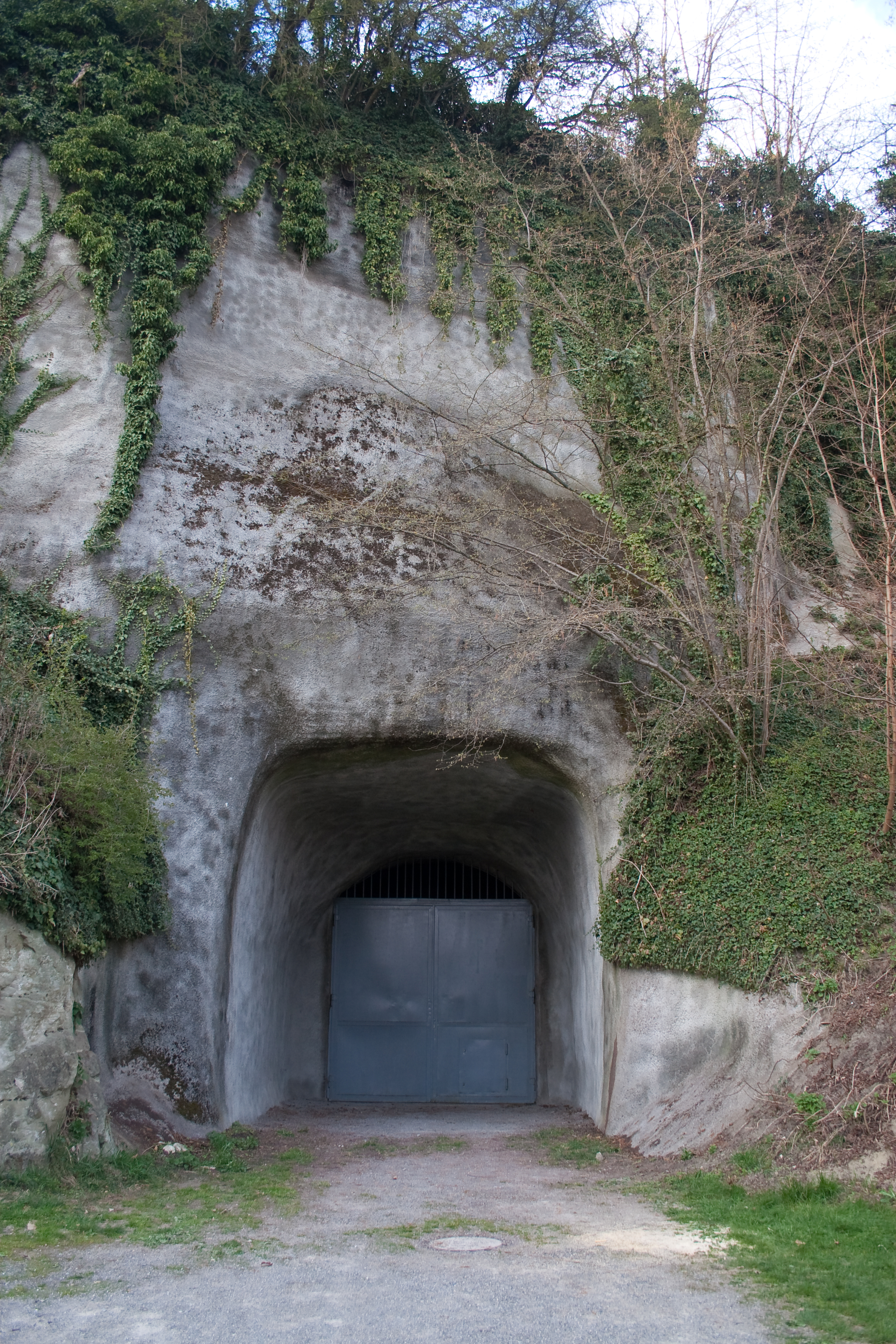
Entrance to the Goldbacher Stollen (2010)

The Goldbach Tunnels (Ger: Goldbacher Stollen) was constructed between June 1944 and April 1945 by inmates of the Überlingen-Aufkirch concentration camp of the Dachau concentration camp under forced labor conditions. It was built into the Molasse rock formation between the village of Goldbach(de) and Überlingen on the northern shore of the Lake Überlingen (part of Lake Constance). The facility was intended to serve as an underground relocation site for war-critical armaments industries from Friedrichshafen, located about 35 kilometers southeast.

== Background ==
As a center of the arms industry in Nazi Germany, Friedrichshafen was a frequent target of Allied air raids during World War II. By the end of the war, nearly all factories — including those of Luftschiffbau Zeppelin, Maybach-Motorenbau, Zahnradfabrik Friedrichshafen, and Dornier Flugzeugwerke — had been destroyed, as well as large portions of the city itself. Starting in 1943, parts of the arms production were decentralized to areas surrounding Friedrichshafen.

On May 1, 1944 — three days after another major air raid — the "Jägerstab", responsible for increasing fighter aircraft production within the Reich Ministry of Armaments and War Production, ordered the construction of tunnels for Friedrichshafen-based companies in Hohenems (Vorarlberg) and Überlingen. Überlingen was situated along the Stahringen–Friedrichshafen railway and featured accessible Molasse rock, a soft and easily excavated material. Construction began in early June 1944 under the oversight of the "Armaments Inspection Upper Rhine" and was initially scheduled to last 100 days.

== Construction ==
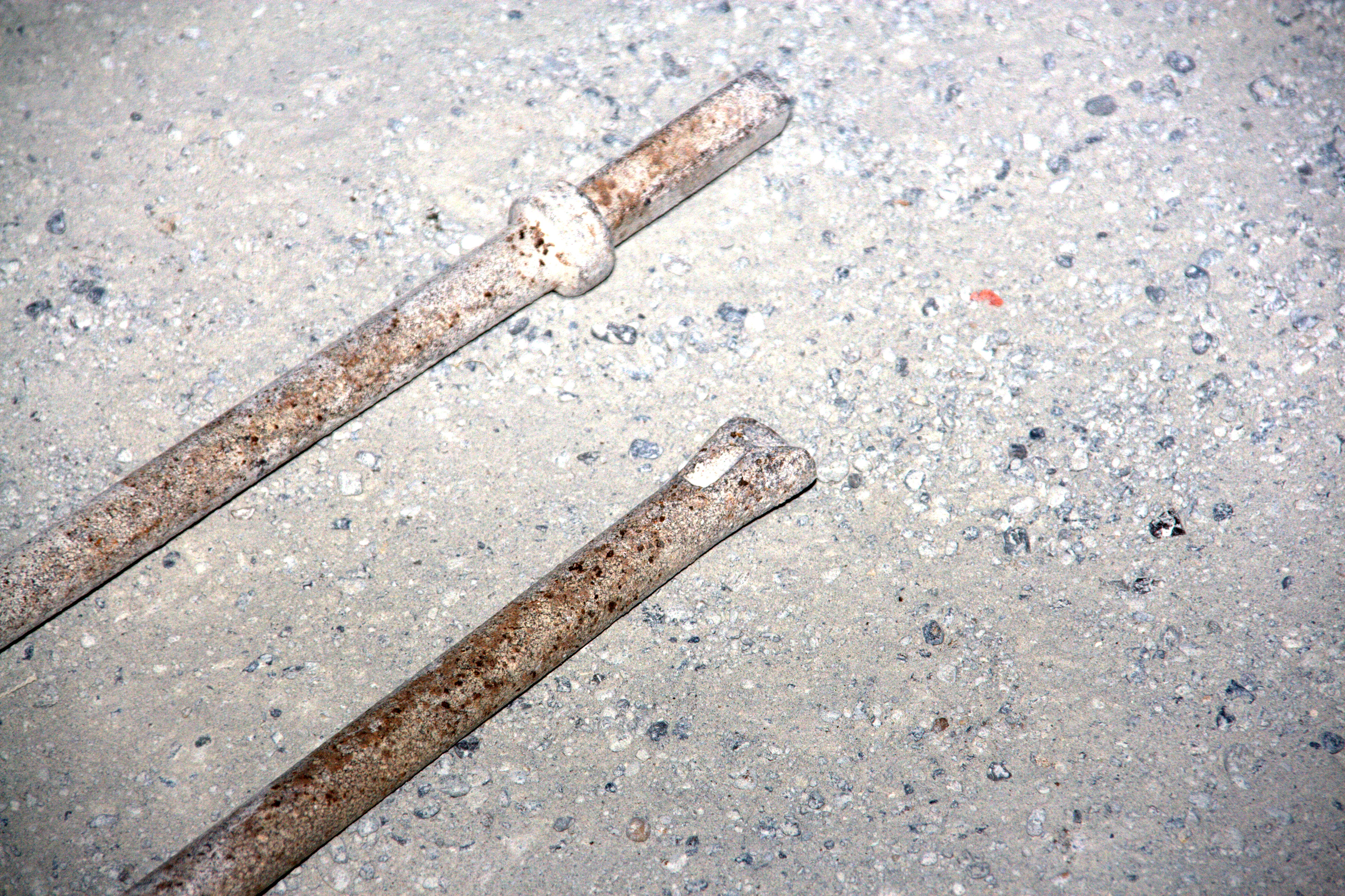
Drill shaft and bit used in construction

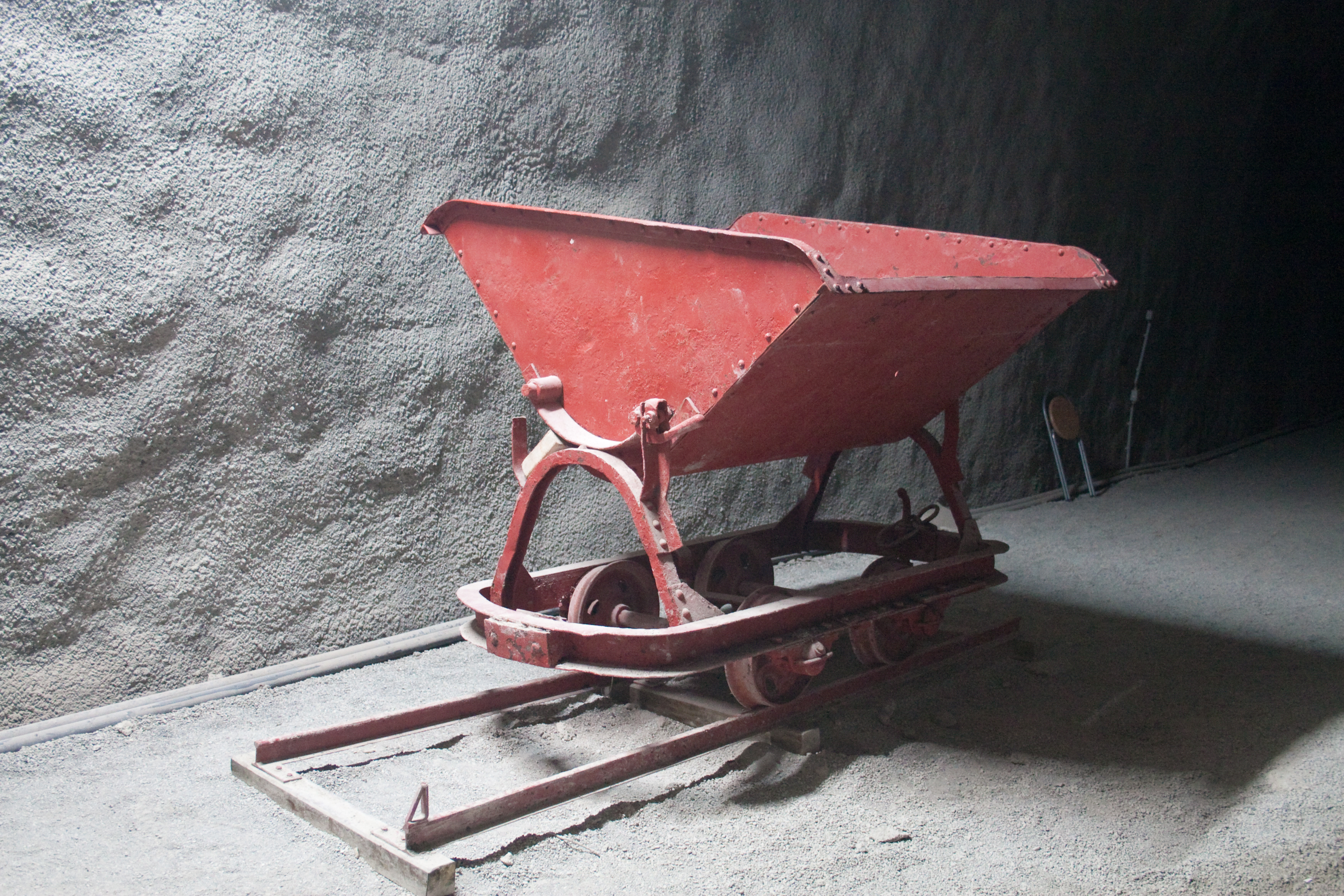
Tipper cart used to transport excavated material

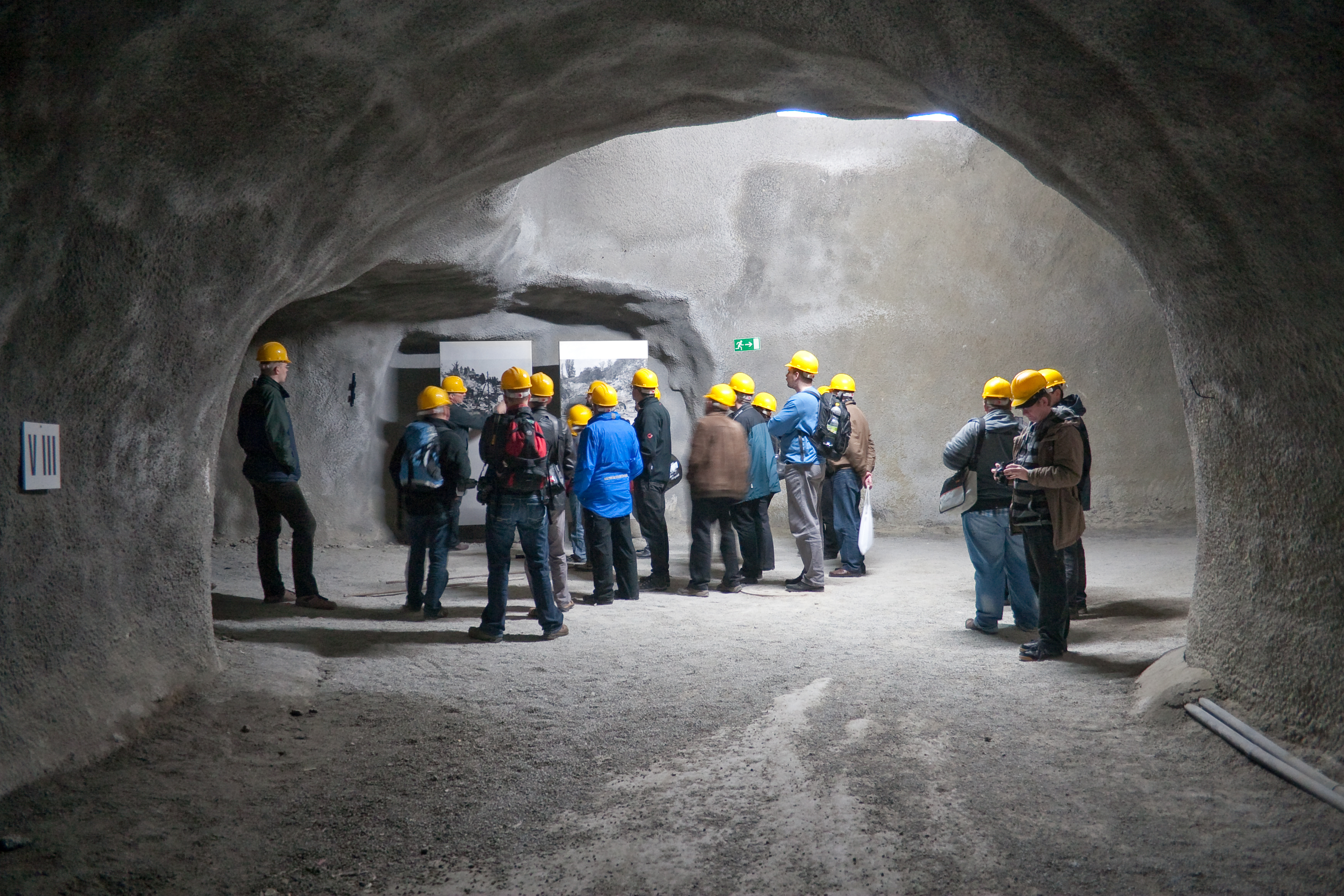
Guided tour inside the tunnel

The construction project, codenamed "Magnesit," was led by the Munich engineering firm Arno Fischer. The main contractor was Siemens-Bauunion (Munich), which employed several subcontractors. Local craftspeople also carried out smaller installation tasks. Supervision was provided by the Organisation Todt on behalf of the armaments ministry.

Initially, 100,000 m^{2} of underground space was planned; this was reduced to 40,000 m^{2} by autumn 1944, with Maybach-Motorenbau, Zahnradfabrik Friedrichshafen, and Dornier designated as the operating companies. Each company was assigned a longitudinal tunnel with a rail connection.

By the end of the war, construction had produced 17 cross tunnels, 8 entrances, and over four kilometers of underground passages. The tunnels varied in width (2–25 meters) and height (2–10 meters); some intersections were designed as halls. With the exception of some window tunnels, the tunnel floor levels lay between 399 and 402 meters above sea level, while Lake Constance's average water level is 396 meters. The area above the tunnels, already densely built-up before 1944, lies 10–60 meters higher.

To speed construction, concentration camp inmates were used. The Überlingen-Aufkirch subcamp was first documented on September 3, 1944. Approximately 700 inmates were housed in a camp in Aufkirch, 1.5 kilometers from the site. Guarded by 25 SS men under commandant Georg Grünberg, inmates worked 12-hour shifts with no personal safety measures. Their tasks included drilling with pneumatic tools and transporting spoil via tipper carts to the lakeshore, where it was dumped. A campsite later occupied this area, which was redesigned for the Überlingen State Garden Show 2021.

Workers from the Friedrichshafen companies installed machinery in the completed tunnels. According to Dornier employees, a steel-doored wall separated inmate work areas from company staff zones, and this barrier was relocated as construction progressed. Inmates were reportedly barred from sheltering behind the wall during blasts, leading to injuries. SS guards also prohibited interaction between workers and inmates. Survivor Anton Jež recalled frequent rockfalls that caused deaths and injuries. Further accidents occurred when handling unexploded charges. Jež noted that the tunnel's stable temperatures in winter were a "blessing" to the poorly clothed and malnourished inmates. Slovenian inmate Boris Kobe later depicted work conditions in a set of illustrated tarot cards, showing abuse by guards, dangerous tasks, and harsh labor.

Construction ended in mid-April 1945, shortly before Überlingen was liberated by French forces. The remaining inmates were evacuated to the Munich-Allach concentration camp on April 20. Although some machinery had already been installed, production likely never began.

== The Victims ==
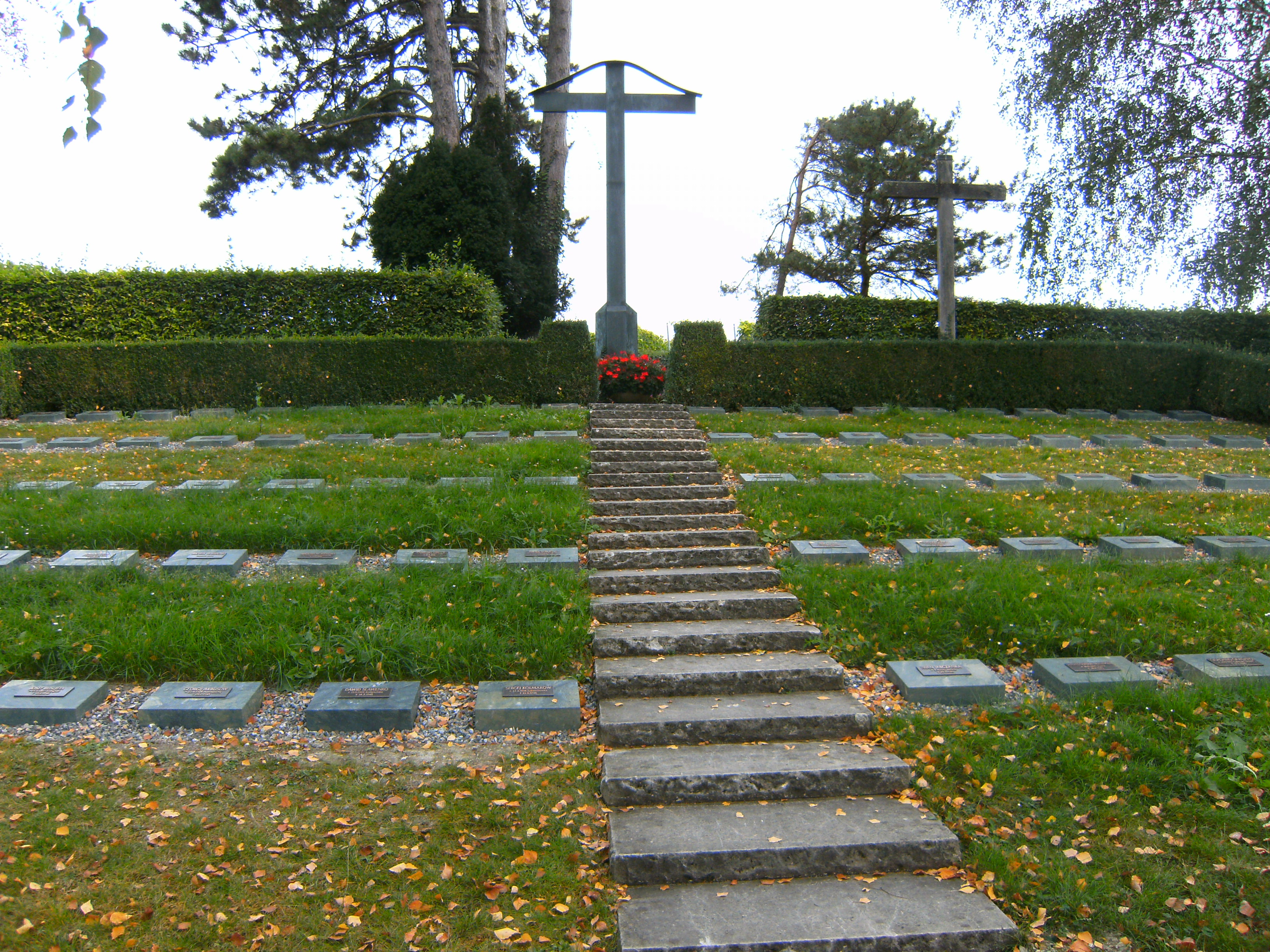
View of the Birnau concentration camp cemetery with two crosses

The first two deceased inmates were buried in the Überlingen cemetery. Later victims were cremated in Konstanz or buried in a nearby forest.

A total of 243 inmates died during construction. The number who died from work-related accidents — some allegedly intentional — remains unknown. Oswald Burger documented the known victims by name. They are buried at the Birnau concentration camp cemetery, southeast of Überlingen, near the Birnau pilgrimage church.

== Postwar Use ==
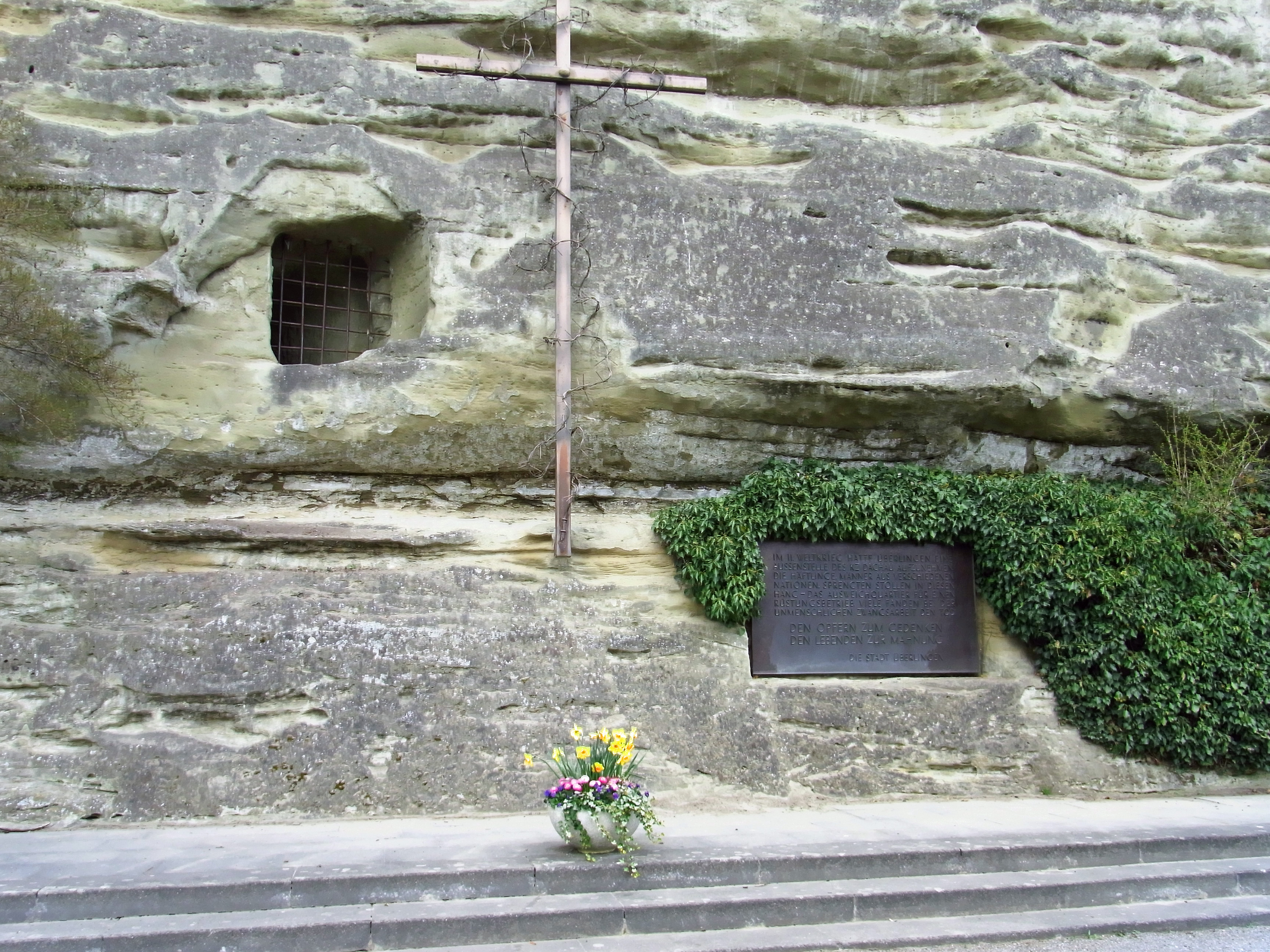
Memorial site

Immediately after the war, the tunnels were looted until French occupation authorities intervened. In 1947, they had the entrances and parts of the tunnel system sealed with explosives. Approximately 3.6 kilometers remained accessible, with 2.5 km passable by car and 1.2 km by truck. Under the German Federal Property Administration, the federal government assumed ownership via the War Consequences Act.

In the 1960s, a new entrance was created to allow for maintenance. Around this time, discussions arose about using the tunnels as air-raid shelters. Between 1983 and 1989, the tunnels were reinforced with shotcrete.

Today, the tunnels are used to store up to 300 caravans and boats over the winter — a practice that caused controversy in 1994. However, visiting former inmates expressed no objections.

Following the 2002 Überlingen mid-air collision, the tunnels served as a temporary morgue for the 71 victims during the identification process.

On May 8, 2005, a commemorative concert was held in the tunnels for the 60th anniversary of the inmates' liberation, featuring the Latvian State Choir led by Māris Sirmais, performing works by Henryk Górecki.

The spoil pile at the lakeshore was later used as a campground. After its closure, it became the "Uferpark" section of the 2021 Überlingen State Garden Show, located between the Sylvester Chapel and Überlingen Therme station.

== Remembrance ==
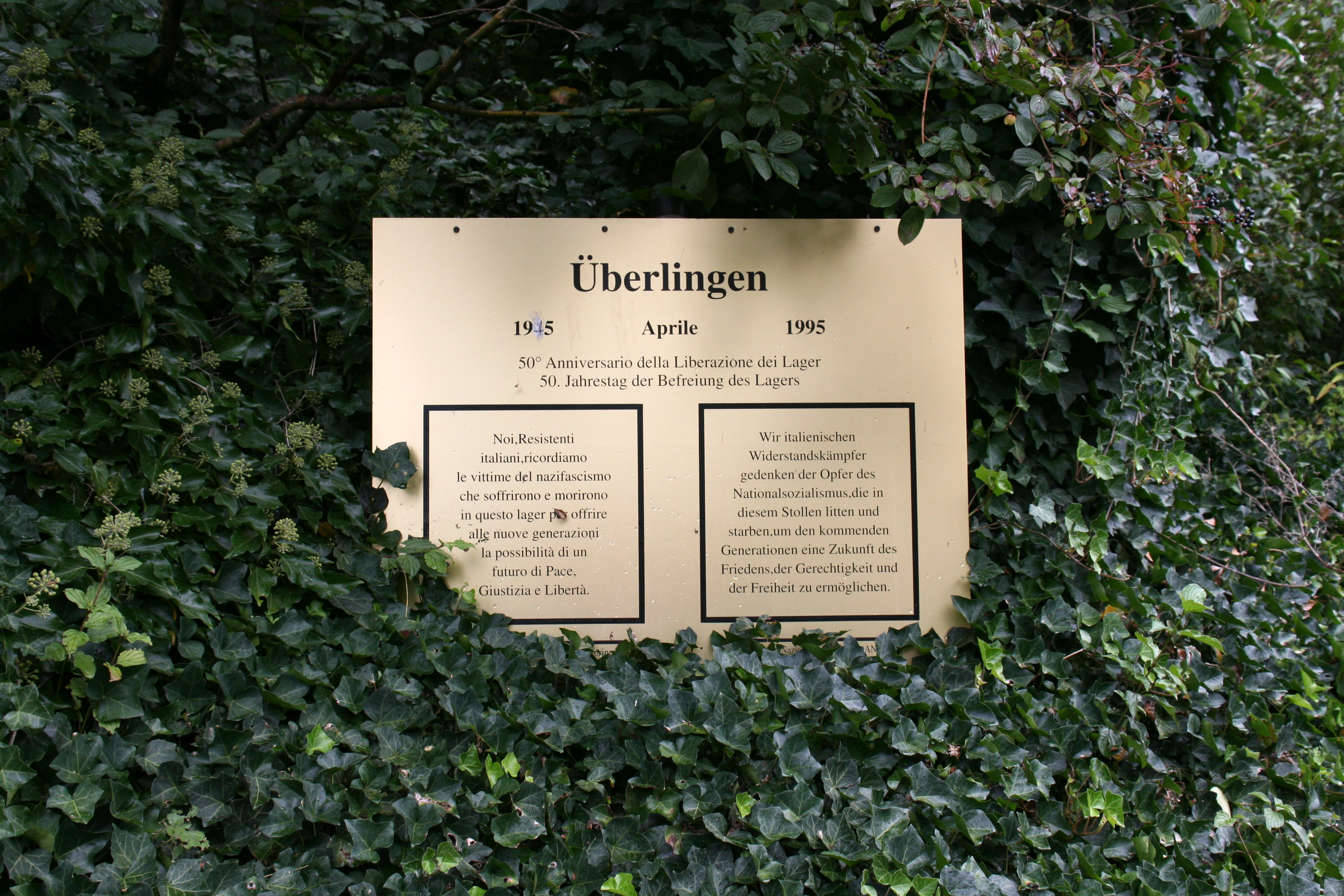
Memorial plaque marking the 50th anniversary of the liberation of the Aufkirch subcamp (April 1995)

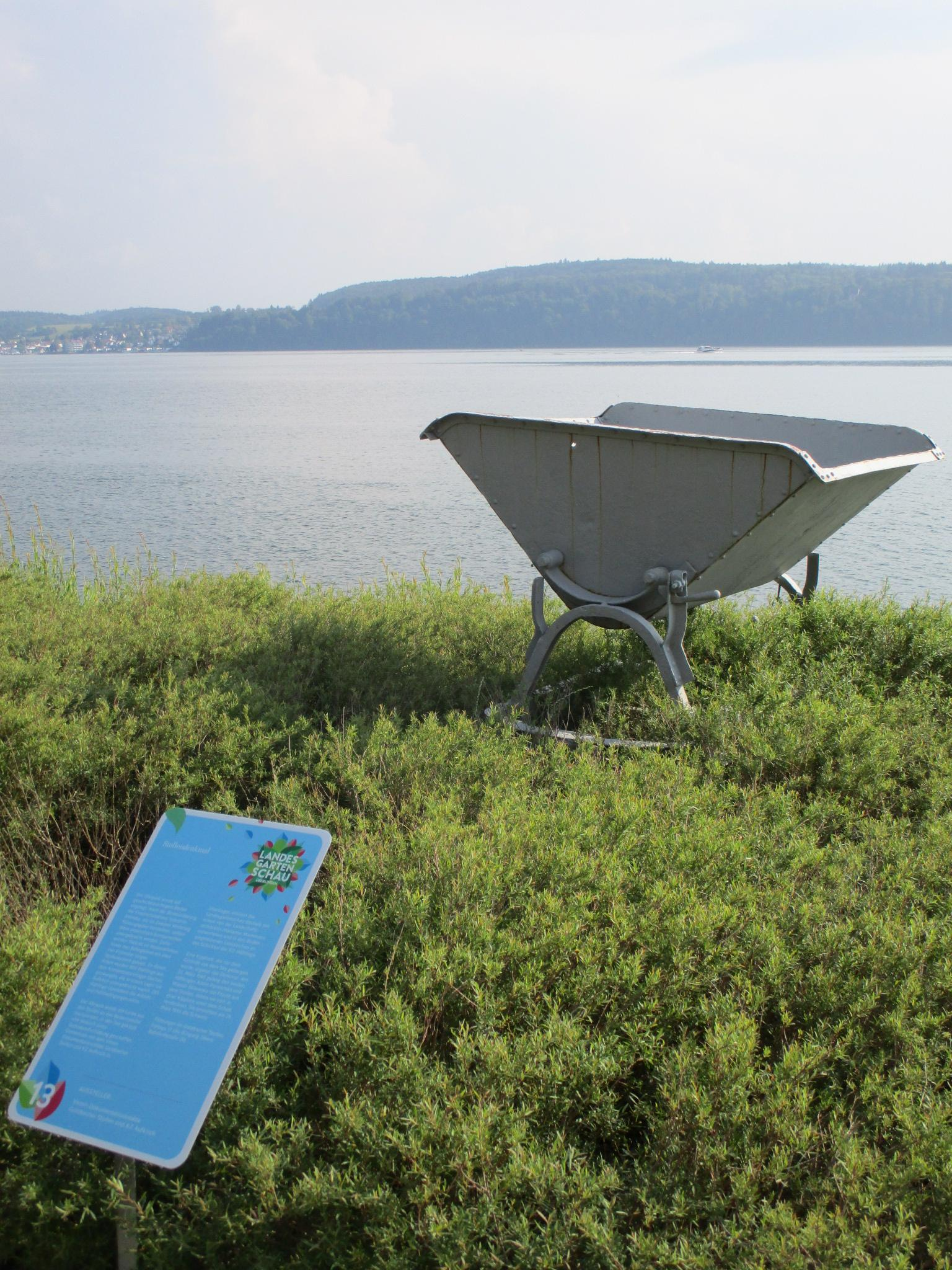
"Bookmark" installation at the Überlingen State Garden Show 2021 with information panel; in the background, the Bodanrück with Dingelsdorf, view facing south

Since 1981, regular guided tours have been offered in the tunnel complex, which has also included a documentation center since 1996.

In 1984, the city of Überlingen erected a memorial at the tunnel entrance, consisting of a cross "crowned" with barbed wire and a commemorative plaque.

For the 2021 State Garden Show, the organizers, in collaboration with the association Documentation Site Goldbacher Stollen and KZ Aufkirch, installed a "bookmark" monument designed by landscape architect Marianne Mommsen. It features a tipper cart recovered from the lake, placed on two rails at the level of the tunnel entrance on the newly redesigned grounds.

== Films ==
- Medienwerkstatt Freiburg: Unter Deutschlands Erde; video, Freiburg im Breisgau 1983
- Stephan Kern, Jürgen Weber: Wie Dachau an den See kam ... Video, Querblick Medien- und Verlagswerkstatt, Konstanz 1995, ISBN 3-9804449-1-0
