= Oberraderach =

Raderach (English: Raderach) was the World War II location of Prüffeld-Anlage Raderach, a V-2 combustion chamber test facility and liquid oxygen factory code named "Porzellan" (porcelain), "Projekt F" and "Observatorium Raderach". Raderach calibration ensured V-2 turbopumps did not overpressure combustion chambers (there was no controller) and was planned for rocket motors to be installed by the nearby Zeppelin Works (German: Luftschiffbau Zeppelin GmbH) as part of the Eastern Works (V-2 facilities in the Vienna-Freidrichshafen area). Firings were visible in Switzerland across Lake Constance and testing ended shortly after the facility began operation.

The first design sketches for the Raderach facility were prepared by Bernhard Tessmann of the Peenemünde Army Research Center, and Captain König was the military representative at Raderach.. By mid-1942, the German Army had started construction of the Raderach motor test stand, and the liquid oxygen (A-stoff) factory with five machines for a combined monthly capacity of 1500 tons. On July 25, 1943, British V-2 intelligence reported that aerial photographic reconnaissance of Friedrichshafen depicted rocket firing sites like those at the Peenemünde Army Research Center. By 1944 the test area was not operating any more, but liquid oxygen production continued. On August 3, 1944, the test facility and the ZF Friedrichshafen at Friedrichshafen were bombed. The 461st Bombardment Group's primary target was the "Raderach Chemical Works", and the Zahnradfabrik (English: gearwheel factory) secondary target was also bombed. The 485th Bombardment Group attacked the "Ober chemical works" on August 16. Oberraderach operated four liquid oxygen machines throughout the rocket blitz from September 1944 through the end of April 1945, when French troops captured the site.
