= Jägerstab =

Nazi German governmental task force on the production of fighter aircraft

- (Fighter Staff)
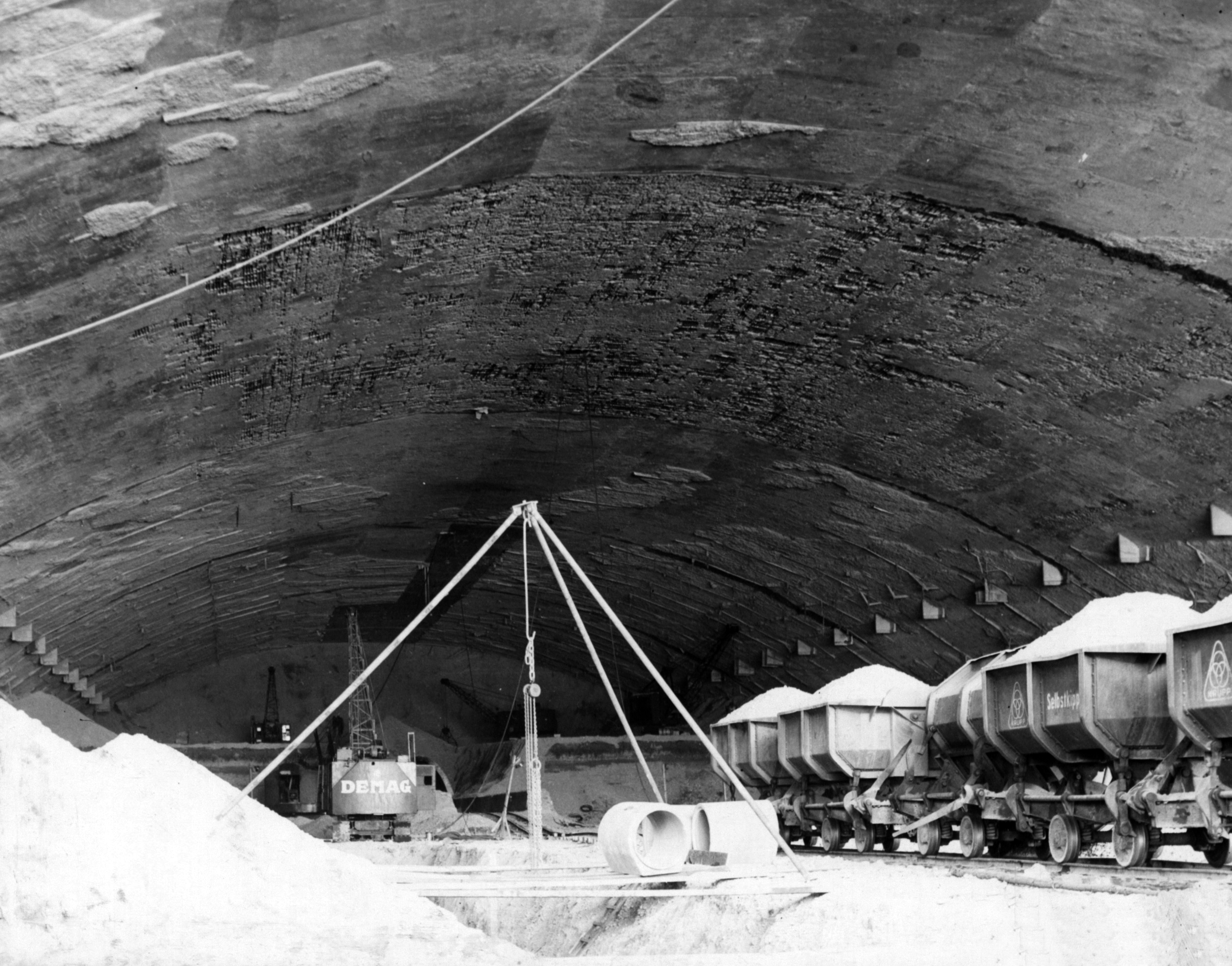
- Internal view of the planned underground factory, Weingut I, one of Jägerstab's projects, as found by the U.S. Army in 1945.

Agency overview
- Formed: March 1, 1944
- Dissolved: August 1, 1944
- Superseding agency: Rüstungsstab (Armament Staff)
- Parent agency: Reich Ministry of Armaments and War Production; Reich Ministry of Aviation

The Jägerstab (Fighter Staff) was a Nazi German governmental task force whose aim was to increase production of fighter aircraft during World War II. Established in March 1944, it was composed of government and SS personnel, as well as representatives of the aircraft manufacturers. The task force played a key role in the Emergency Fighter Program, including the "people's fighter" Heinkel He 162.

The Jägerstab increased the exploitation of slave labour for the benefit of Germany's industry and its air force, the Luftwaffe. It was one of the impetuses for the deportation of Hungarian Jews to Auschwitz, so that the able-bodied Jews could be used for aircraft production.

== Background and formation ==
In early 1944, the Allies focused on the destruction of the Luftwaffe in preparation for the invasion of Normandy. Plans for the Big Week, intended to destroy Germany's capacity to produce fighter aircraft through targeted airstrikes on final assembly factories, were already underway in 1943. Between February 20–25, 1944, approximately 10,000 American and British aircraft, including about 6,000 bombers, attacked strategic targets across Germany. The attacks seriously damaged the German aircraft industry, and production rates fell drastically.

In response, Adolf Hitler authorized the creation of the Jägerstab, which superseded the Reich Aviation Ministry with the aim of increasing fighter aircraft production. The task force was established by Albert Speer, the Minister of Armaments and War Production in the Hitler Cabinet, with support from Erhard Milch of the Reich Aviation Ministry. While Speer and Milch played a key role in directing the activities of the agency, the day-to-day operations were handled by Chief of Staff Karl Saur, a previous head of the Technical Office in the Armaments Ministry.

== Activities and use of slave labour ==
The organisation consisted of multiple committees, including the Airframes Main Committee, Equipment Main Committee and Development Main Committee, that coordinated the work on the development of new aircraft as part of the Emergency Fighter Program. The Airframes Main Committee was chaired by Karl Frydag, who was also a deputy chair of the Development Main Committee and oversaw the day-to-day development and production activities relating to the Heinkel He 162, the Volksjäger ("people's fighter").

The Jägerstab was given extraordinary powers over labour, production and transportation resources; its functions took priority over housing repairs for bombed out civilians and restoration of vital city services. The factories that came under Jägerstab control saw their work-weeks extended to 72 hours. At the same time, Milch took steps to rationalise production by reducing the number of variants of each type of aircraft produced.

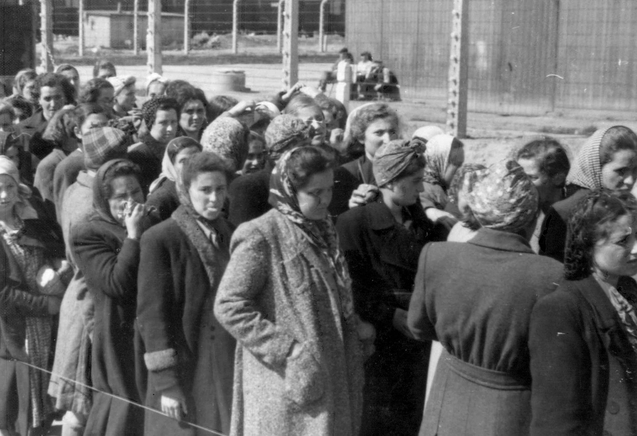
Hungarian Jewish women selected for slave labour at Auschwitz

The task force immediately began implementing plans to expand the use of slave labour in the aviation industry. On 9 March 1944, Heinrich Himmler, the head of the SS, informed the Aviation Minister and head of the Air Force Hermann Göring that the SS would provide 100,000 prisoners to move aircraft production underground. These prisoners were to be obtained by deporting Hungarian Jews to Auschwitz as part of Operation Höss. The need for labor to increase fighter production was used to justify the deportations to the Hungarian government. Of the 437,000 Hungarian Jews deported between May and July 1944, about 320,000 were gassed on arrival at Auschwitz and the remainder forced to work. Only about 50,000 survived.

The plan to protect the aircraft industry, especially the manufacture of the jet-powered Messerschmitt Me 262, required relocating assembly plants to underground bunkers. A similar proposal had been considered in October 1943, but was never realized. The Jägerstab's original plan included six locations, but by June 1944 the Allied landing in Normandy had forced the Jägerstab to focus on two locations in Upper Bavaria. Three bunkers were to be built at Kaufering concentration camp in the Landsberg am Lech district, and the code name "Weingut I" (Vineyard I) was chosen for the factory in the Mühldorf concentration camp complex.

Records show that SS provided 64,000 prisoners for 20 separate projects at the peak of Jägerstab's construction activities. Taking into account the high mortality rate associated with the underground construction projects, the historian Marc Buggeln estimates that the workforce involved amounted to 80,000−90,000 inmates. They belonged to the various sub-camps including Mittelbau-Dora, Mauthausen-Gusen and Buchenwald. The prisoners worked for manufacturers such as Junkers, Messerschmitt, Henschel and BMW.

== Results ==
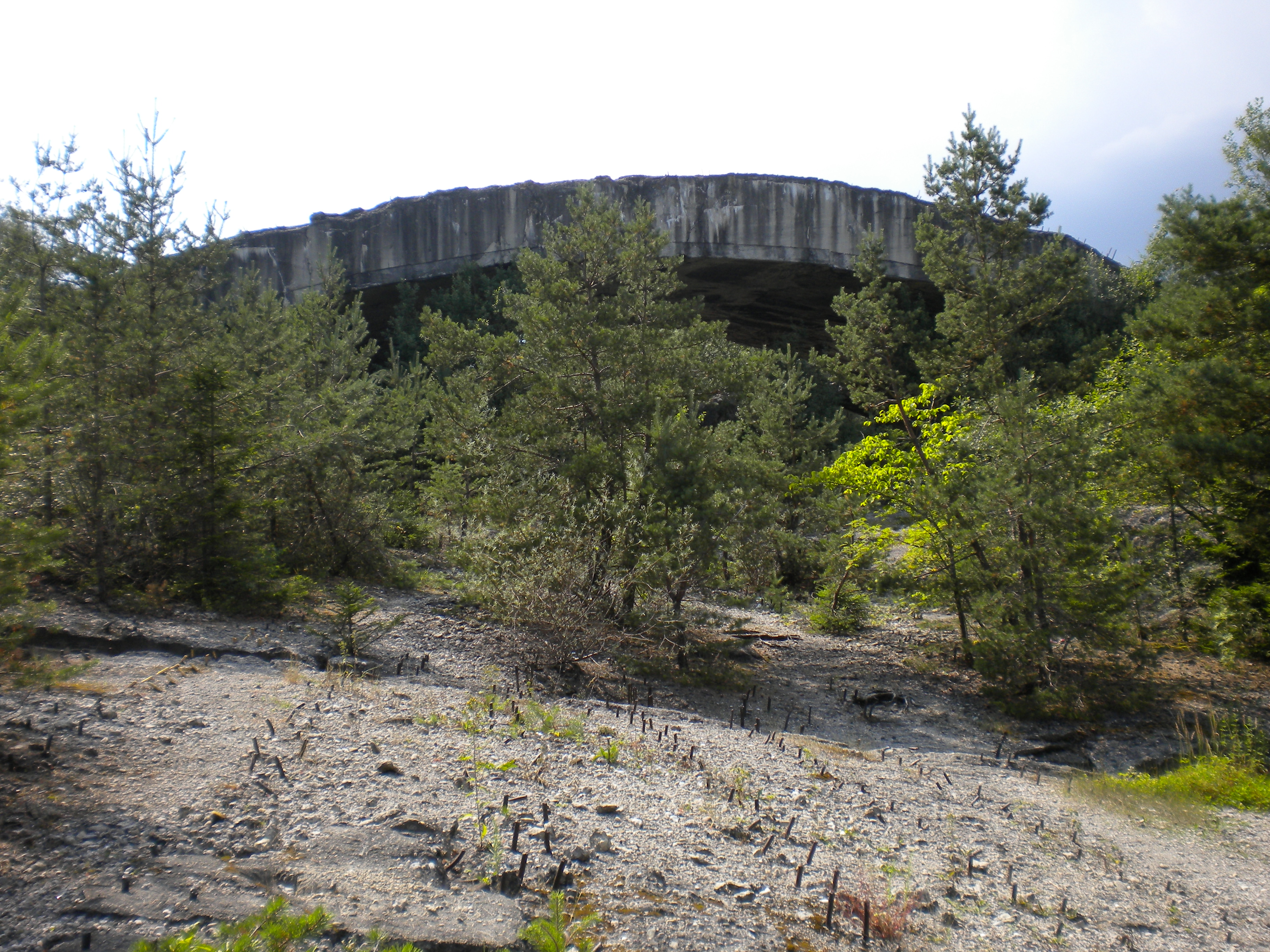
The last remaining arch of Weingut I, one of seven that were completed out of a planned twelve underground factories

The progress achieved by the Jägerstab was seen as a success by the German authorities. From February–July 1944, the production of the Fw 190 and Bf 109 fighters increased by 150 per cent.

The cooperation between the Reich Ministry of Aviation, the Ministry of Armaments and the SS proved especially productive. Although intended to function for only six months, Speer and Milch discussed with Goring in late May the possibility of centralising all of Germany's arms manufacturing under a similar task force. On 1 August 1944, Speer reorganised the task force into the Rüstungsstab (Armament Staff) to apply the same model of operation to all top-priority armament programs. The new task force assumed responsibilities for the Jägerstab's underground transfer projects.

== See also ==
- German aircraft production during World War II
