= Mühldorf concentration camp complex =

Satellite system of Dachau

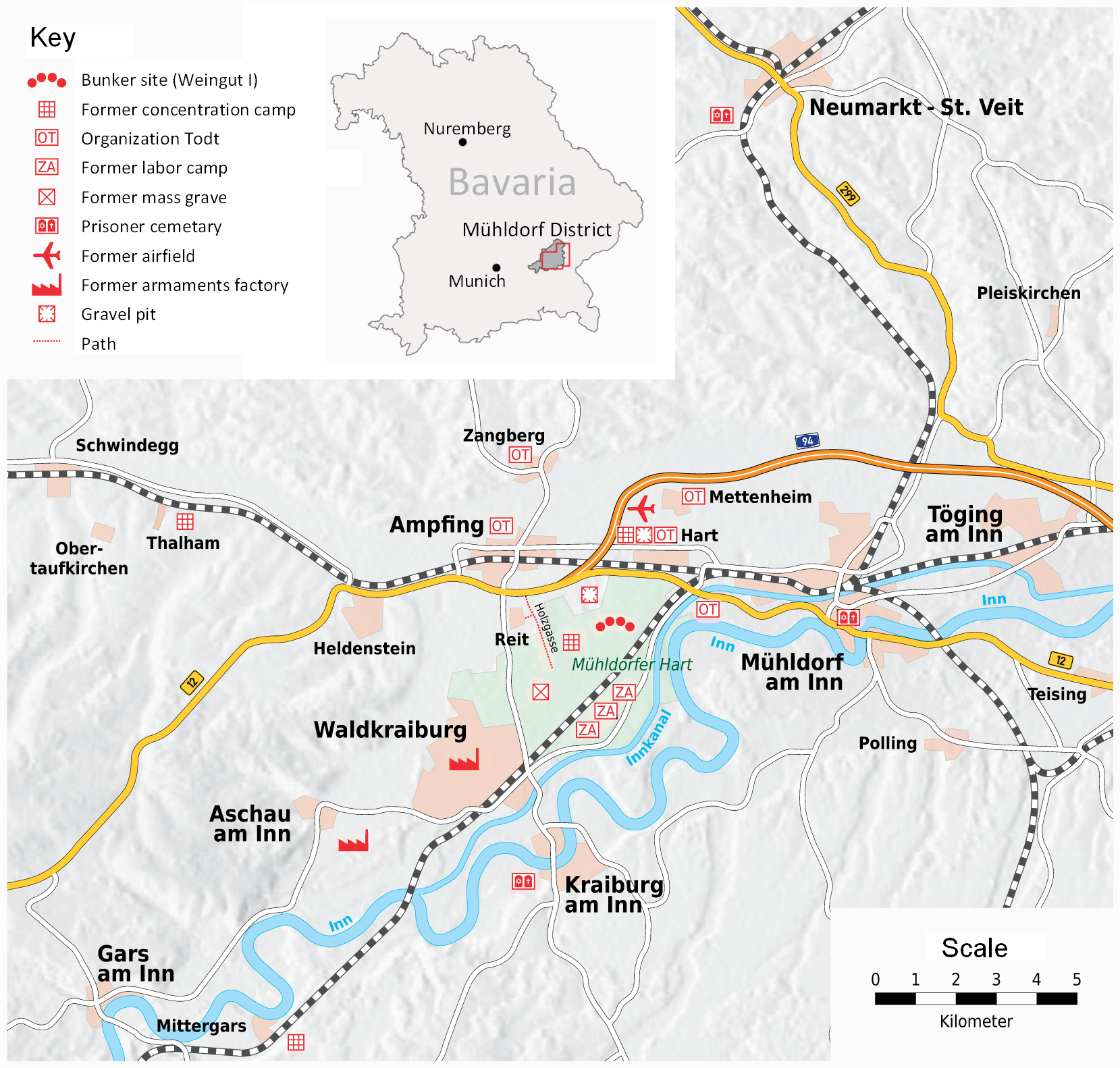
Map showing the former concentration camp complex, the planned underground factory Weingut I, forced labor camps, and armaments factories in the Mühldorf district near the end of World War II

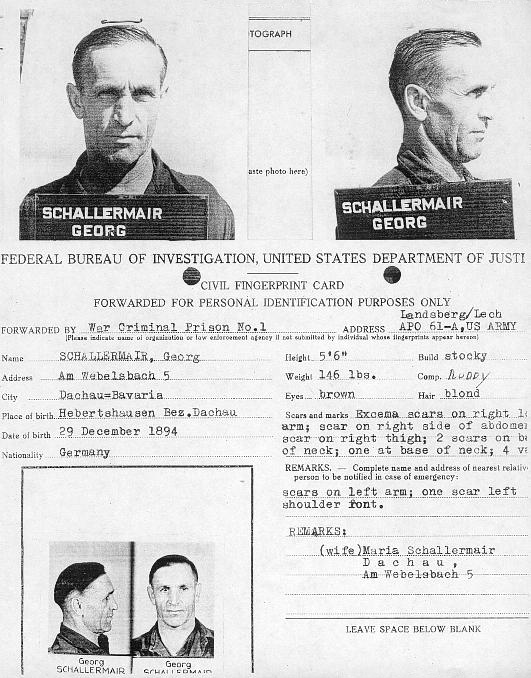
The arrest card of Georg Schallermair, (SS-Master-Sergeant) at Mühldorf subcamp from August 1944 until 1945. He was tried for war crimes committed at Mühldorf, was found guilty and executed on the gallows at Landsberg Prison in 1951

Mühldorf (Note: [ˈmyːldɔʁf], approximately MOOL-dorrf) was a satellite system of the Dachau concentration camp located near Mühldorf in Bavaria, established in mid-1944 and run by the Schutzstaffel (SS). The camps were established to provide labor for an underground installation for the production of the Messerschmitt Me 262, a jet fighter designed to challenge Allied air superiority over Germany.

== Operation ==
Between July 1944 and April 1945, when the U.S. Army overran the area, more than 8,000 prisoners had been deported to the main camp at Mettenheim and to its subcamps.

As the Allied air offensive against Nazi Germany intensified after 1943, the Nazi leadership decided to construct underground installations in order to produce weaponry and related war material. Accelerated construction of such facilities required significant outlay of human resources. The SS provided concentration camp prisoners to carry out the most dangerous tasks, such as hollowing out tunnels from mountainsides and caves, constructing subterranean factories, and hauling construction materials. To facilitate these immense projects, it set up hundreds of satellite camps close to proposed industrial sites in 1944 and 1945.

According to the account of a prisoner who turned over the camp's administrative files to American authorities, the Mettenheim camp held some 2,000 inmates, a nearby women's camp 500 persons, the "forest camps" (Waldlager) about 2,250 male and female inmates, while two other camps held a total of 550 persons. Most of the prisoners were Hungarian Jews, but there were also Jews from Greece, France, Italy as well as political prisoners from Russia, Poland and Serbia. The surrounding area also contained numerous forced-labor and prisoner-of-war camps to supply workers for the factory.

Conditions at the Mühldorf complex were dismal. As at the Kaufering camps, the SS guards carried out "selections" at the Mühldorf complex in the fall of 1944, deporting hundreds of sick and disabled inmates to the gas chambers at Auschwitz. It is estimated that more than half of the prisoners held there perished following their deportation to the Auschwitz-Birkenau killing center or died on site from overwork, abuse, shootings, and disease. Prisoners in the "forest camps V and VI" (Waldlager V and VI), located near the town of Ampfing, were housed in earthen huts, barracks partially submerged in the ground with soil-covered roofs designed to camouflage the structures from Allied aerial reconnaissance. Prisoners frequently worked 10- to 12-hour days hauling heavy bags of cement and carrying out other arduous construction tasks.

In late April, as the U.S. Army approached the camps, the SS guards evacuated some 3,600 prisoners from the camp on death marches.

== War crimes trial ==
The commandant of Mühldorf, Walter Langleist, was tried in the main Dachau camp trial in 1945. He was found guilty of war crimes, sentenced to death, and hanged at Landsberg Prison on May 28, 1946.

In February 1946, the U.S. military court in Dachau indicted fourteen Nazi officials of the Mühldorf camp for crimes committed against the unarmed prisoners, including killings, beatings, torture, starvation and abuse. On May 13, 1947, thirteen of the defendants were found guilty, six were sentenced to death by hanging, two to life imprisonment, and the remainder to sentences varying from 10 to twenty years; one was acquitted. Only one of the death sentences was carried out, with the others being commuted to prison terms.

Another Mühldorf official, Georg Schallermair, was tried separately in September 1947. He was the leader of roll call command, and personally beat many prisoners to death. Schallermair was found guilty of war crimes and sentenced to death. Although most of the remaining death row inmates were granted clemency in 1951, he was one of seven men to have their death sentences upheld. General Thomas T. Handy confirmed Schallermair's death sentence on these grounds:

"Georg Schallermair, as leader of a roll command, was directly responsible for the prisoners in Mühldorf, a subcamp of Dachau. He himself beat many prisoners in such a way that they died as a result. Of 300 people who were brought to the camp in autumn 1944, only 72 were alive after four months. Every day he visited the morgue with a dentist imprisoned to break out the dead gold teeth. There are no facts or arguments that can in any way justify grace in this case."

Schallermair was hanged at Landsberg Prison on June 7, 1951. He was one of the last 7 Nazi war criminals to be executed by the United States.

== See also ==
- Dachau Trials
- Weingut I
