= Karl Saur =

German ministry official (1902–1966)

Reich Minister of Munitions
- In office 30 April 1945 – 5 May 1945 (Note: When the cabinet posts in the Flensburg Government were filled on May 5, 1945, the post of Minister of Armaments and War Production was no longer included.)
- President: Karl Dönitz
- Chancellor: Joseph Goebbels
- Preceded by: Albert Speer
- Succeeded by: Office abolished

Personal details
- Born: 16 February 1902 Düsseldorf, Rhine Province, Kingdom of Prussia, German Empire
- Died: 28 July 1966 (aged 64) Pullach, Bavaria, West Germany
- Party: Nazi Party
- Military career
- Allegiance: Nazi Germany

Karl-Otto Saur (16 February 1902 – 28 July 1966) was a high ranking official in the Reich Ministry of Armaments and War Production in Nazi Germany and was named as Reichsminister of Munitions in Adolf Hitler's political testament.

== Life ==
Saur was an engineer by profession. After graduation, he joined Thyssen AG, where he became the director of the August Thyssen-Hütte. He was a member of the Nazi Party from 1931. He joined the National Socialist Guild of German Engineers and the Organisation Todt where he rose to be the right-hand man to Fritz Todt. When Todt became the first Minister of Armaments and Munitions in March 1940, Saur joined him in the new ministry.

Following Todt's death in a 1942 plane crash, Saur became the Head of the Technical Department and reported directly to the new armaments minister Albert Speer. From 1 March 1944, he was Chief of Staff of the newly established Jägerstab (Fighter Staff), despite having no knowledge or experience with aircraft design or production. This was a joint task force of the Armaments Ministry and the Reich Ministry of Aviation, and Saur managed its day-to-day operations. It was tasked with increasing fighter aircraft production, reconstructing damaged industrial facilities, and moving air armament works to safer, underground facilities. On 1 August 1944, Saur was named Deputy Chief and Chief of Staff of the new Rüstungsstab (Armament Staff) into which the Jägerstab was merged and which oversaw production for all armaments industries. In all these positions, Saur was seen as particularly ruthless in the enforcement of military targets, and was involved in all aspects of increasing production, including orders that regulated the flow of slave labour.

In his political testament of 29 April 1945, Adolf Hitler named Saur as the new Reichsminister of Munitions in place of Speer. However, the new Reich President, Karl Dönitz, ignored this directive and kept Speer on as Reichsminister of Industry and Production in the Flensburg government. From May 1945 Saur was in American custody. In 1948 he became a witness for the prosecution at the Krupp trial in Nuremberg - the Americans offered him immunity from prosecution for war crimes if he turned state's evidence, as they wanted a trial to demonstrate the collective guilt of German industry. After doing this he was viewed as a traitor by industry and was socially isolated. During denazification he was classified as a "fellow traveler" and was released shortly afterward.

Saur founded an engineering consultancy in 1949, and also started a small publishing house, Dokumentation Saur, which only became economically successful, now named Saur Verlag, from 1966 under his son Klaus Gerhard Saur.

== Sources ==
- Faber, Harold (1977). Luftwaffe: A History. New York: Times Books. ISBN 0-8129-0725-6.
- Speer, Albert (1970). Inside the Third Reich. New York: Avon Books. ISBN 978-0380000715.
- Uziel, Daniel (2011). Arming the Luftwaffe: The German Aviation Industry in World War II. Jefferson, N.C.: McFarland & Co. ISBN 978-0-7864-6521-7.
