= Mettenheim =

- Municipality
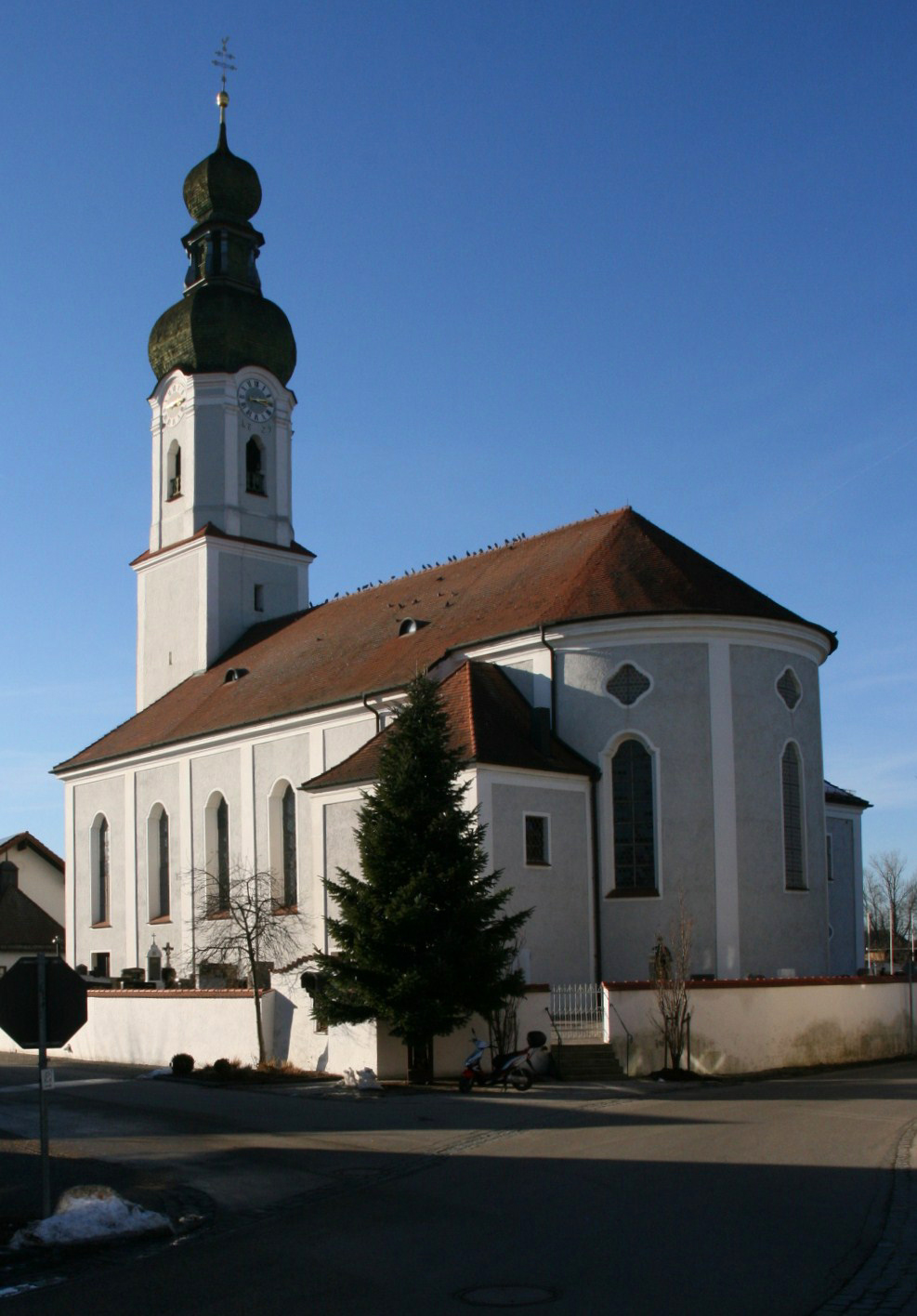
- Saint Michael Church

- Coat of arms

- Location of Mettenheim within Mühldorf am Inn district
- Interactive map of Mettenheim
- Location within Germany Location within Bavaria
- Coordinates: 48°16′N 12°28′E
- Country: Germany
- State: Bavaria
- Admin. region: Oberbayern
- District: Mühldorf am Inn

Government
  - Mayor (2020–26): Josef Eisner (CSU)

Area
  - Total: 27.24 km^{2} (10.52 sq mi)
- Elevation: 411 m (1,348 ft)

Population (2025-12-31)
  - Total: 3,686
  - Density: 135.3/km^{2} (350.5/sq mi)
- Time zone: UTC+01:00 (CET)
  - Summer (DST): UTC+02:00 (CEST)
- Postal codes: 84562
- Dialling codes: 08631
- Vehicle registration: MÜ
- Website: www.gemeinde-mettenheim.de

Mettenheim (German pronunciation: [ˈmɛtn̩haɪm]) is a municipality in the district of Mühldorf in Bavaria in Germany.
