= Reich Ministry of Armaments and War Production =

Nazi German ministry

- Reichsministerium für Rüstung und Kriegsproduktion

Agency overview
- Formed: 17 March 1940; 86 years ago
- Dissolved: 8 May 1945; 81 years ago
- Jurisdiction: Government of Nazi Germany
- Headquarters: Viktoriastraße 11, Berlin
- Employees: 500
- Minister responsible: see list

The Reich Ministry of Armaments and War Production (German: Reichsministerium für Rüstung und Kriegsproduktion) was established on March 17, 1940, in Nazi Germany. Its official name before September 2, 1943, was the 'Reichsministerium für Bewaffnung und Munition' (transl. Reich Ministry of Arming and Munitions).

Its task was to improve the supply of the Wehrmacht with the necessary supplies of weapons and ammunition.

== Ministers ==
No.	Portrait	Name (born–died)	Term of office			Political party	Cabinet	Ref.
No.	Portrait	Name (born–died)	Took office	Left office	Time in office	Political party	Cabinet	Ref.
1	Fritz Todt	Fritz Todt (1891–1942)	17 March 1940	8 February 1942 ‽	1 year, 328 days	NSDAP	Hitler	
2	Albert Speer	Albert Speer (1905–1981)	8 February 1942	30 April 1945	3 years, 81 days	NSDAP	Hitler	
3	Karl Saur	Karl Saur (1902–1966)	30 April 1945	5 May 1945	5 days	NSDAP	Goebbels	
