= Dundaga Castle =

Castle in Latvia

- Dundaga municipality, Courland, Latvia
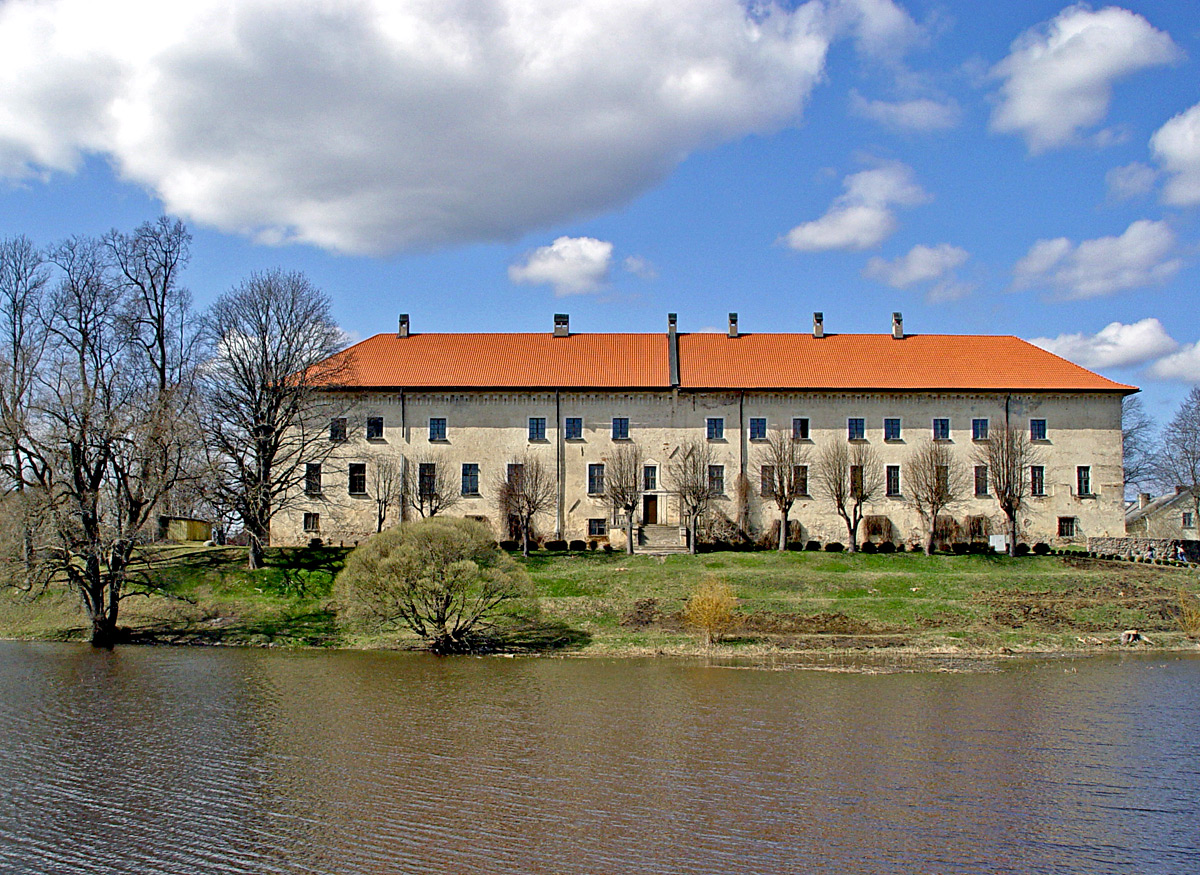
- Dundaga Castle

Site information
- Type: Castle
- Condition: Preserved

Location
- Coordinates: 57°30′38″N 22°21′22″E

Site history
- Built: Late 13th century
- Built by: Archbishop of Riga

Dundaga Castle is a medieval castle in Dundaga, in the Talsi Municipality in the Courland region of Latvia. Latvia considers Dundaga Castle to be a monument of archaeological and of architectural importance.

== History ==
The Archbishopric of Riga gained control over the lands of Dundaga in 1237. Dundaga Castle was constructed next to a Curonian settlement (Dundagas Kalnadarzs hillfort). The exact time of construction is not known, though it is first mentioned in written sources in 1318. It is assumed that the castle was constructed in the late 13th century, and several times captured by Livonian Order.

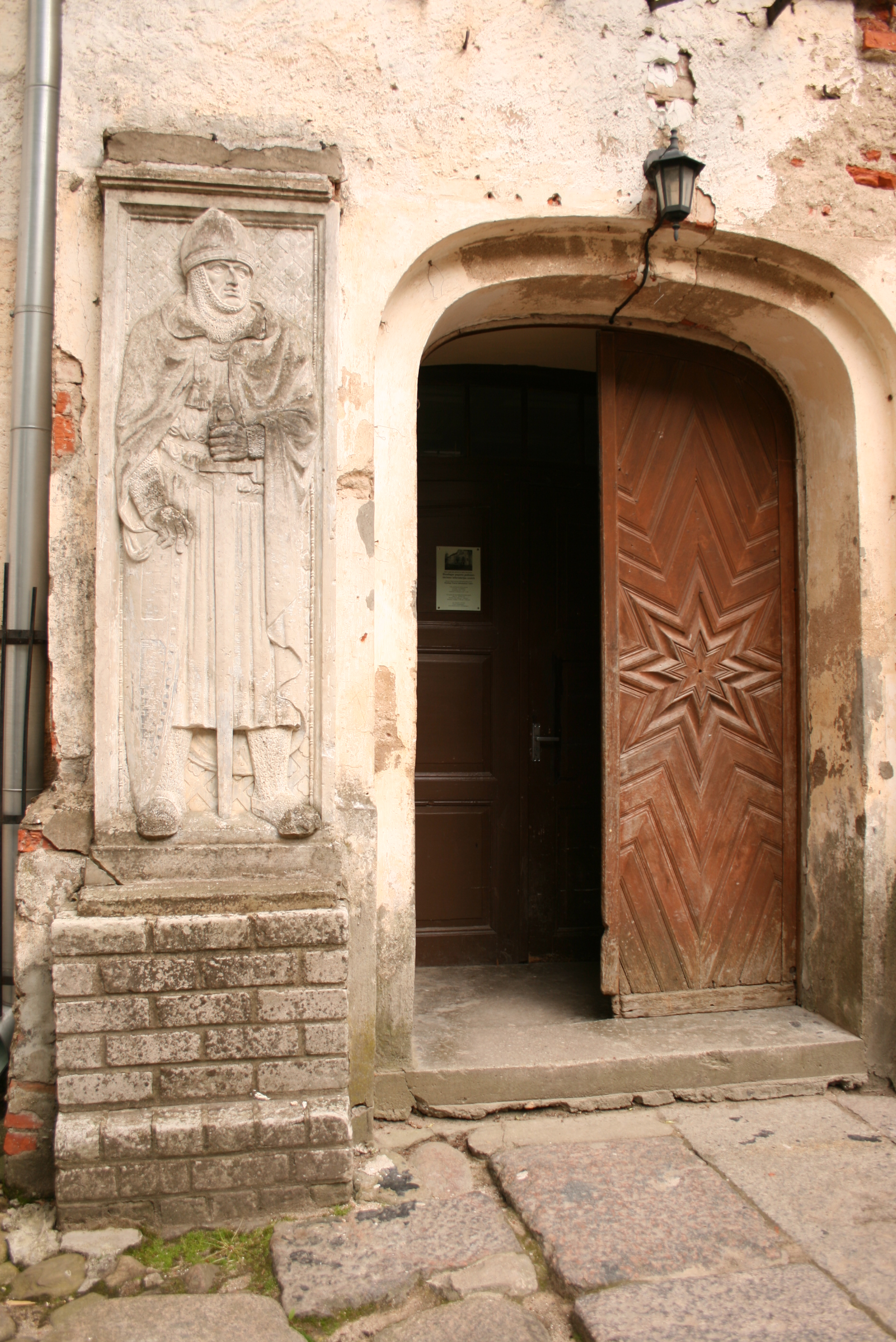
Bas relief of monk with helmet and sword at inner entrance

In 1434 the castle was sold to the Bishopric of Courland, and sold again in 1559 – to the King of Denmark who in turn granted it to his brother Magnus, Duke of Holstein – future Curonian Bishop.

In the middle of the 17th century, it was transformed from a medieval fortress to a representative residence of a country nobleman by Anna Sybil (born Osten-Sacken). The third floor was added in 1785. The family of Osten-Sacken were owners of the castle up to 1920.

Dundaga Castle suffered heavily in a fire in 1872 and its historical interiors were destroyed. It burned again in 1905, and was renovated beginning in 1909 after the design of H. Pfeiffer. As a result, the castle was modernised and transformed.

Since 1926 the castle has been used as a public building – as a local municipal administration, school, and cultural institution.

The castle is the source of numerous legends, tales and ghost stories which, in many cases, are close to real historical events.

== Description ==
The castle is surrounded by water on three sides. The fourth side was defended by a moat in medieval times, today it is on level ground.

The castle covers 48 by 69 meters (157 ft × 226 ft), rectangular, surrounded with high defensive walls. In the inner yard a well has been preserved. The castle has been transformed in numerous renovations and does not have a specific architectural style.

Interesting monuments of art are bas reliefs at both sides of the main entrance in the inner yard – made by A. Voltz in 1909. One represents a warrior monk, the other – a bishop.

== Sources ==
- Bankau J.F. Dondangen, Ritterschloss und Privatgut in Kurland. Dorpat, 1855. (in German)
