= Dundaga Municipality =

Municipality of Latvia

Coordinates: 57°31′N 22°21′E

Dundaga Municipality Dundagas novads
- Former municipality
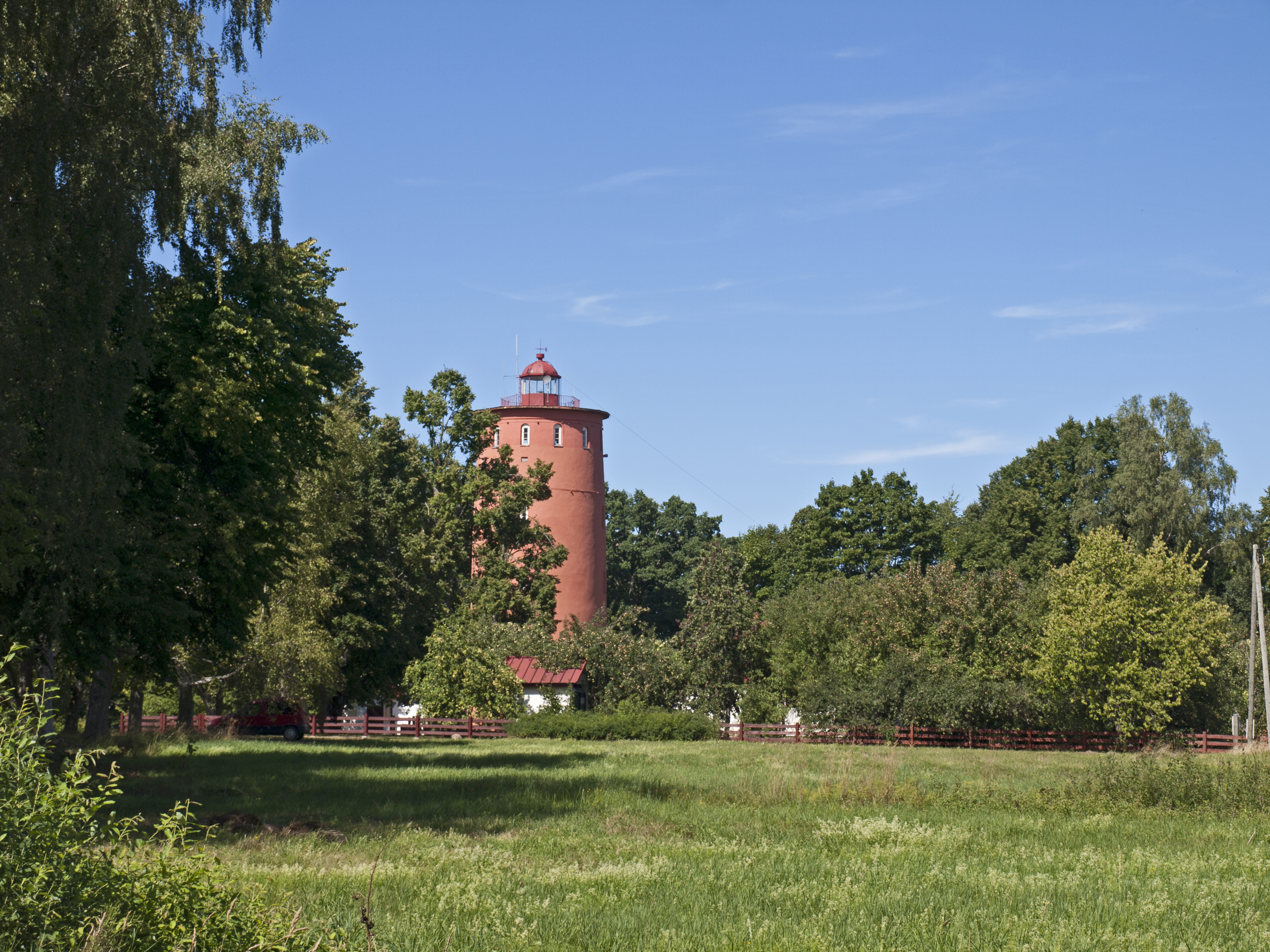
- Slītere Lighthouse

- Flag Coat of arms

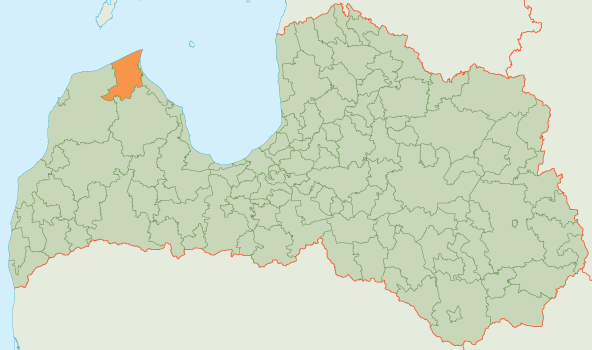
- Country: Latvia
- Formed: 2009
- Centre: Dundaga

Government
  - Council Chair: vacant

Area
  - Total: 676.35 km^{2} (261.14 sq mi)
  - Land: 667.74 km^{2} (257.82 sq mi)
  - Water: 8.61 km^{2} (3.32 sq mi)

Population (2021)
  - Total: 3,487
  - Density: 5.222/km^{2} (13.53/sq mi)
- Website: www.dundaga.lv

Dundaga Municipality (Latvian: Dundagas novads, Livonian: Dūoņig mōgõn) is a former municipality in Courland, Latvia. The municipality was formed in 2009 by merging Dundaga parish and Kolka parish, the administrative centre being Dundaga. As of 2020, the population was 3,571.

On 1 July 2021, Dundaga Municipality ceased to exist and its territory was merged into Talsi Municipality.

== Notable sites ==
- Dundaga Castle

== See also ==
- Administrative divisions of Latvia (2009)
