= Michel Tournier (Gascoigne book) =

1996 book by David Gascoigne

Michel Tournier is a 1996 book by David Gascoigne, published by Berg Publishers.

The book primarily talks about the author's works of fiction, whilst non-fiction works are occasionally referred to within texts to explain the fiction works.

According to Sheila Bell of the University of Kent, the book can appeal to both academics and non-academics, and therefore of the Tournier-related works she reviewed, this would have the highest number of prospective readers.

David Platten of the University of Leeds wrote that this book has a distant perspective and results in "a more wide-ranging, less fanatical" point of view; according to Platten the book is an "attempt to construct a more substantial Tournier Weltanschauung."
