= Von der Osten family =

German family name

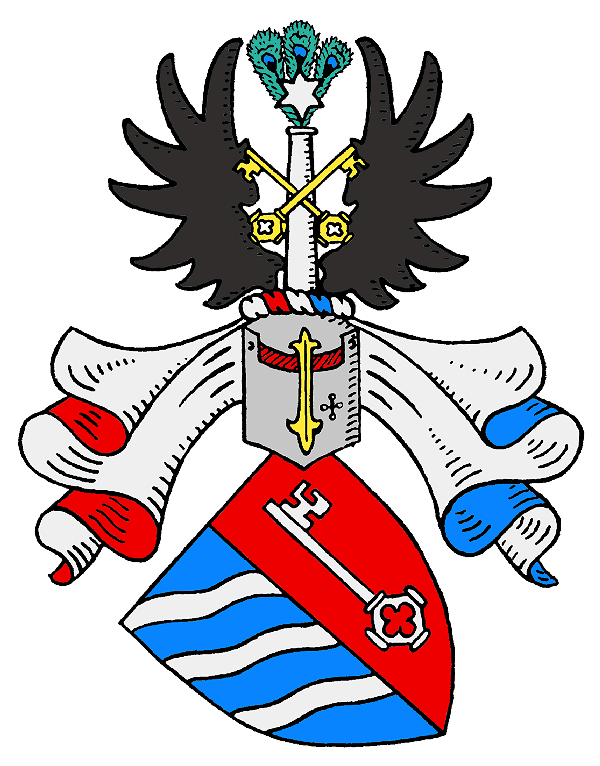
Coat of arms of the House von der Osten

The von der Osten family [ ˈoːstən ] is an ancient and distinguished aristocratic family from Pomerania that has been established in Pomerania since 1248, originally from Stift Bremen. The family's ancestral home is in Lower Saxony, near the Oste River. The family acquired numerous properties in Western and Eastern Pomerania, becoming one of the largest landowners in Pomerania. In 1854, the von der Ostens were one of the first ten families to hold the hereditary right of presentation to the Prussian House of Lords.

Von der Osten-Sacken [ ˈoːstən ] is the name of a German-Baltic noble family that has been settled in the Baltic region since the 13th century. Arnoldus dictus Lyndale was enfeoffed with Sacken by Bishop Otto of Courland in 1386 and appeared as Arnoldus de Sacken in 1395. Sander von Sacken, known as von der Oest, first appeared with the combined name in 1544, which later became Osten-Sacken and led to the unification of the coats of arms with the von der Ostens, although no evidence of a common ancestry between the two families has been found. The Osten-Sackens produced numerous officers and diplomats of the Russian tsarist empire. In 1762, one branch was granted the title of Imperial Count, and in 1786, the title of Prussian Prince. In 1821, another branch was granted the title of Russian Count and in 1832, the title of Prince.

== History ==
=== Von der Osten ===
==== Origins ====
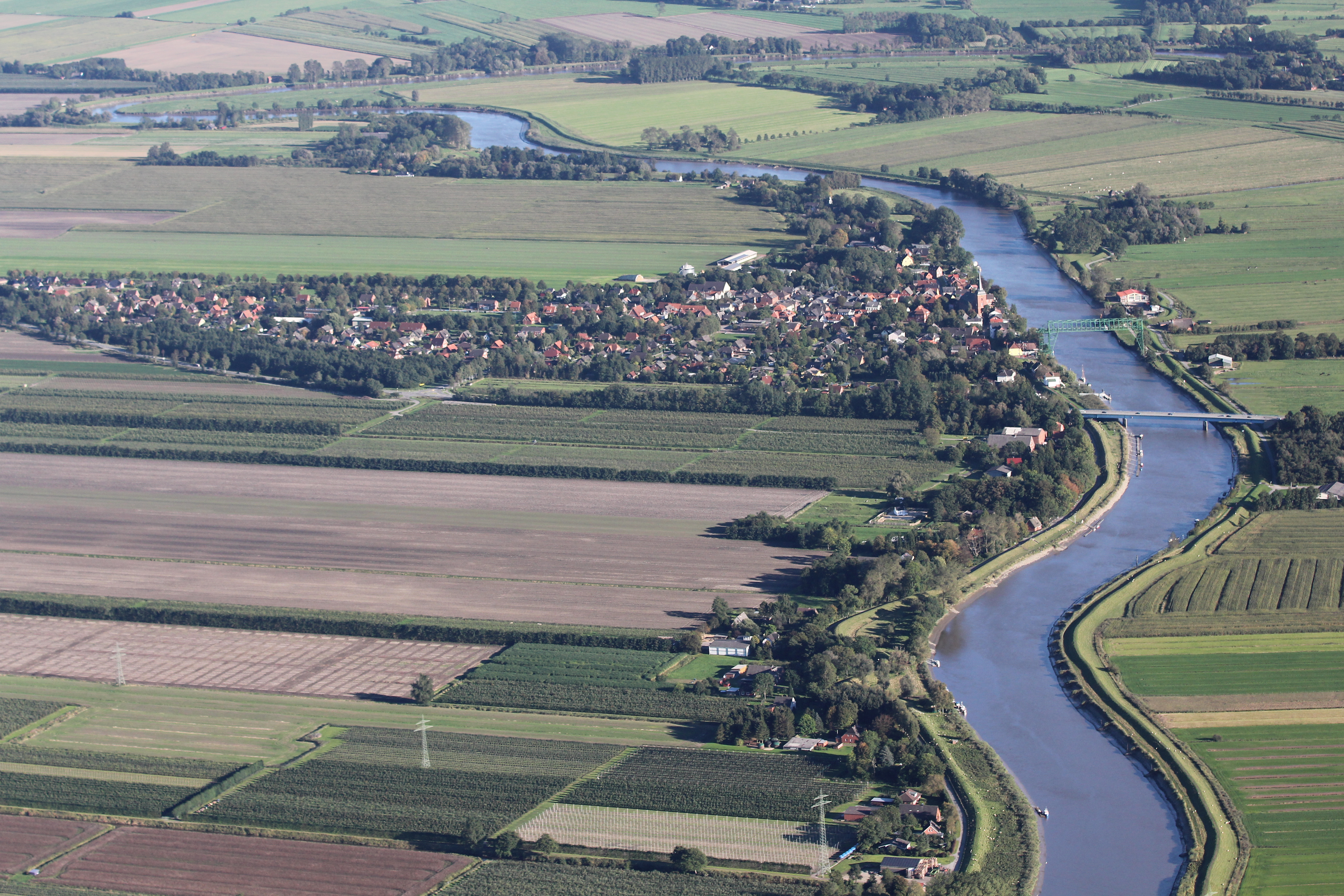
Osten an der Oste

The actual origin of the von der Osten family is said to be the area around Paderborn in Westphalia. However, the family appears in records for the first time in 1219 with Egehard de Oste and the presumed brother pairs Bertold de Oste, Theodericus de Oste, Walther de Oste, and Hizel de Oste as ministeriales of Archbishop Gebhard II of Bremen or more specifically the county of Stade, which in turn was granted as a fief by the Archbishop and fell back to him in 1236. The family name is derived from the near to Cuxhaven church village of Osten on the left bank of the Oste, a navigable tributary of the Lower Elbe in Lower Saxony, where the Ostens held the knight's estate as a fief from the Archbishopric of Bremen in the 13th and 14th centuries. They were last mentioned in their original homeland in 1426 with Hermann III., Burgmann of Horneburg.

The noble family from Lower Saxony spread to Holstein, Mecklenburg, Pomerania, and the Principality of Rügen. Between 1285 and 1456, the Ostens held the office of Landvogt of Rügen, the highest office of the principality, seven times. The brothers Ulrich and Friedrich ("Olricus advocatus Dyminensis et dominus Fredericus frater ipsius") appear in a document in November 1248 in Demmin.

==== Vogts of Demmin ====
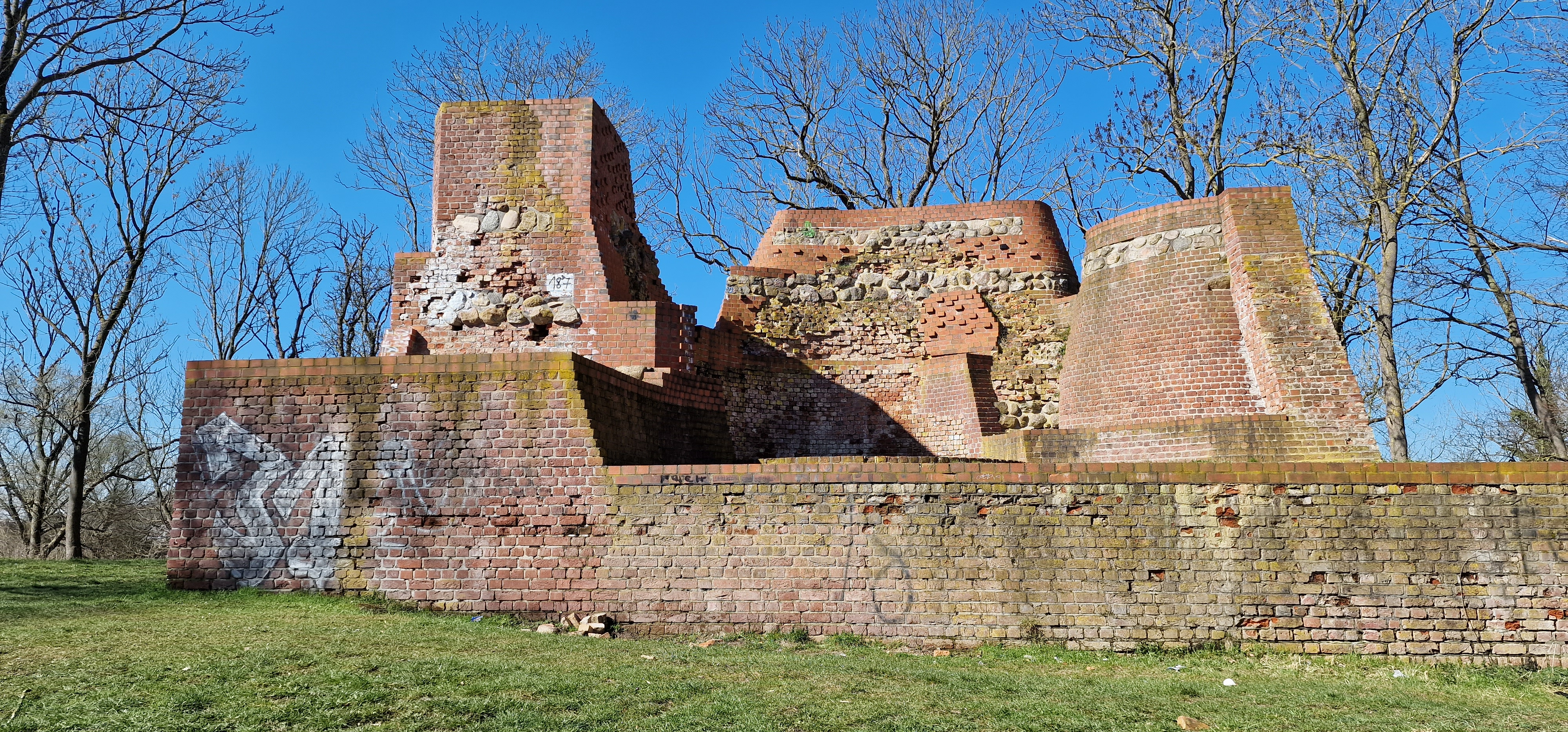
The ruins of the castle tower of House Demmin.

Sir Ulricus de Osten was documented from 1243 to 1255 as the princely Pomeranian bailiff in Demmin. In his capacity as such, he transferred four hides in Wittenwerder to the Dargun monastery. His sons Arnold, Hermann, and Otto were also mentioned as knights and castle men at the princely Castle Haus Demmin between 1271 and 1322. The ducal line of Pomerania-Demmin had already died out in 1264 and the rule had fallen to the Dukes of Pomerania-Stettin, which is why the bailiffs now acted alone on the castle. Hennecke, Arnold's son, was referred to as the ducal-Pomeranian castle man at Lindenberg Castle near Upost from 1319 to 1363. Arnold Jr., Otto's son, was also a knight and castle man in Demmin from 1303 to 1315. Wedige, Hermann's son, was referred to as the bailiff in Demmin, sitting on the Osten Castle near Demmin. He was thus the first of the Ostens on this castle, from which he probably gave his name. The Osten Castle was probably built in the early 13th century. It passed to the Winterfeld in the early 14th century and to the Maltzahn in 1330, but the Ostens were still landed in the area after 1363. After the Thirty Years War, the castle was demolished.

==== Landed nobility in Pomerania ====
In 1303, Hynricus and Bernardus de Osten were referred to as vassals of the prince of Werle (according to Schwarz). This suggests that they had moved from Pomerania to Mecklenburg to serve Werle.

Later, Fredericus de Osten miles dictus de Woldenborch, sat in Pyritz on Woldenburg, in the Regenwalde district (today Dąbie). With both brothers and their descendants, the Ostens belonged to the castle- or manor-sitted families in the Duchy of Pomerania. The family continued to spread to the Neumark, Poland and Denmark, later to Prussia and Bavaria.

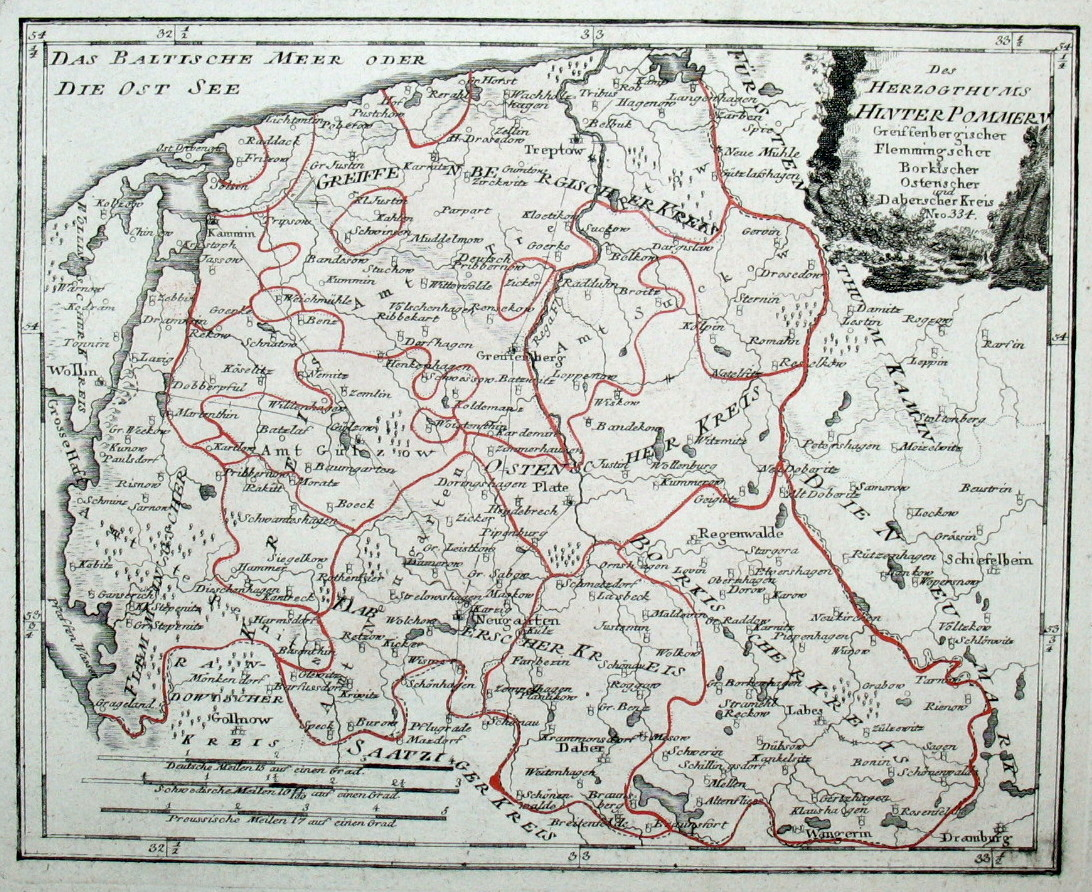
Map of the Duchy of Hinterpommern with the Osten District (in the eastern center)

In 1367, the Ostens bought the lordship of Plathe in Hinterpommern from the Wedells. In 1577, Wedige von der Osten was forced to sell the old family castle and a part of the city to Hermann von Blücher. The Ostens then built a new castle a few hundred meters away, which belonged to the family until they were expelled in 1945. However, the current "New Castle" is only a building from the early 20th century, except for a side wing. From the 17th century to 1817, there was the Osten- and Blücher circle around Plathe, so named because of the two families with the largest property. The divided lordship over Plathe ended when Matthias Conrad von der Osten (1691-1748), Chief Financial Advisor and Chief President of the Kurmark War and Domains Chamber in Berlin, married the last heir of the Plathener line of the Blüchers in 1731, thus reunifying the two properties. The circle was now called the "Osten Circle" and covered 37,750 hectares.

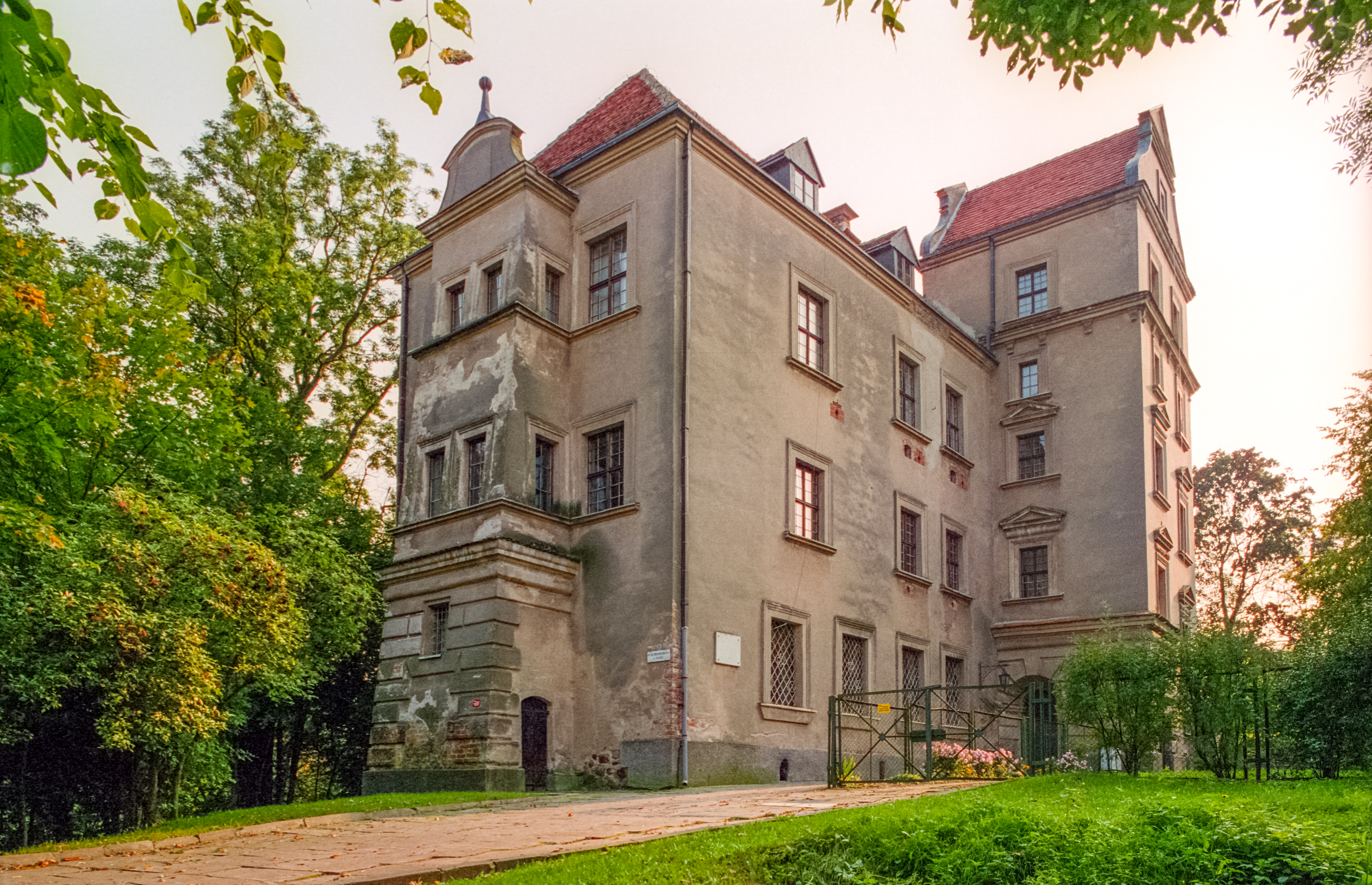
Altes Schloss Plathe („Blücherschloß“)

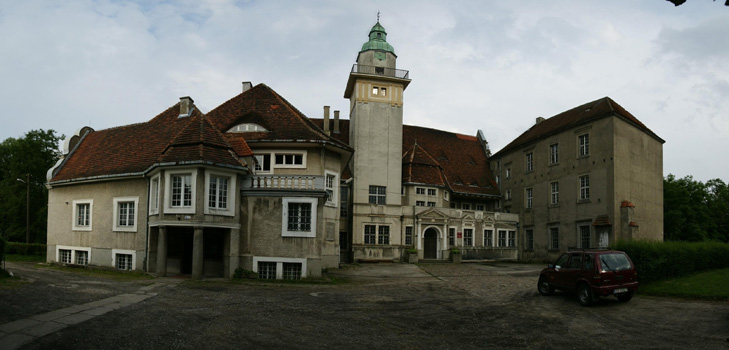
Neues Schloss Plathe („Ostenschloß“)

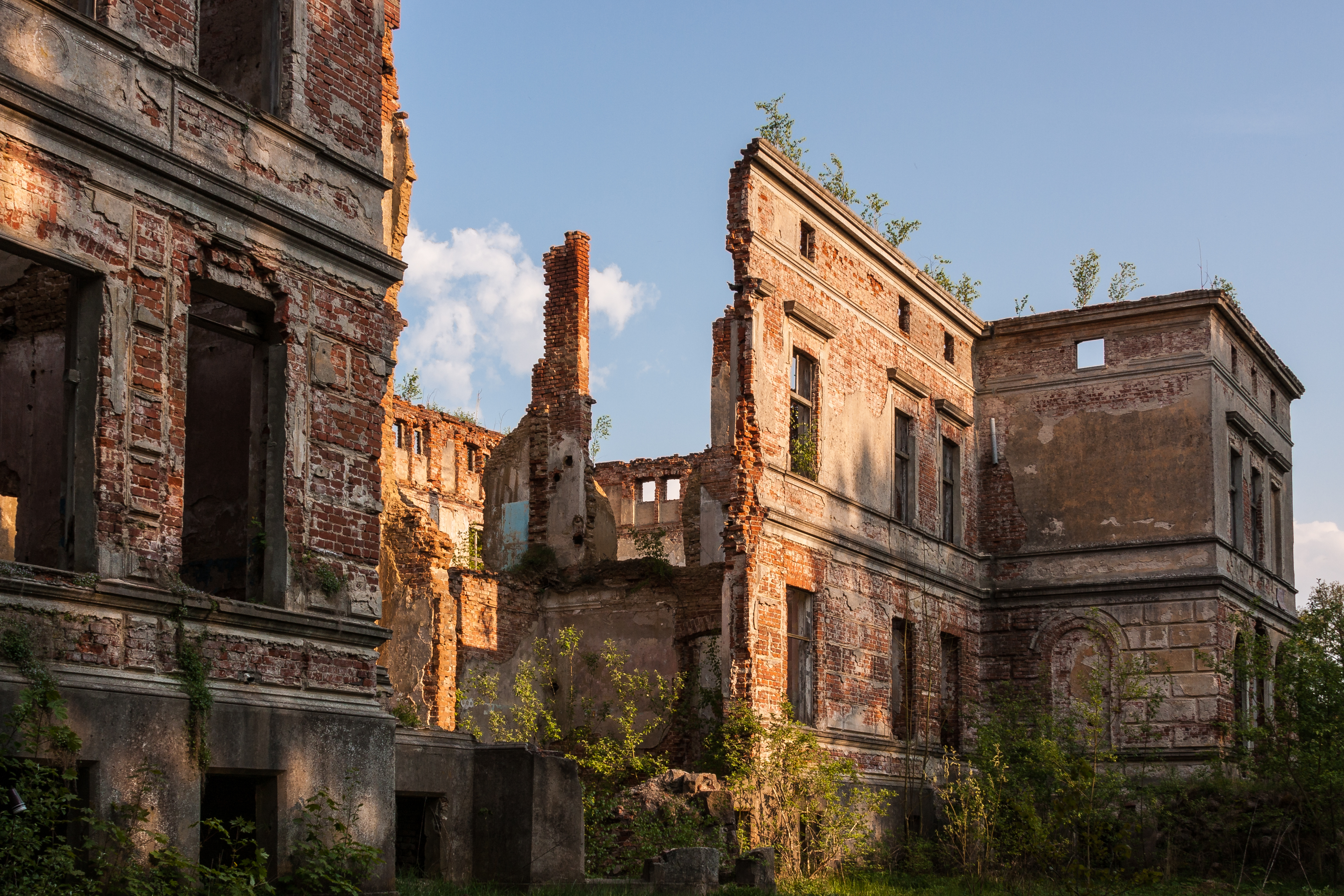
Schloss Witzmitz

In addition to other holdings, the von der Osten family also had larger holdings on the island of Rügen, including Gut Kapelle near Gingst and Gut Lipsitz near Bergen on Rügen (1603 to 1730). In 1615, Henning von der Osten bought Penkun with the castle in Vorpommern. After being sold in 1756, it was re-acquired by August Wilhelm von der Osten in 1817 and remained in the family's possession until it was seized during the land reform in 1945.

In 1763, Heinrich Karl von der Osten acquired Gut Blumberg from his father-in-law and uncle from the von Sydow family. His son Karl von der Osten built the manor house in 1792. In 1898, the 2,500-hectare estate passed to Friedrich Wilhelm von der Osten on Penkun. Henning von der Osten was expropriated in 1945 during land reform. In 1996, his three sons were able to regain the estate house with courtyard and park, and in 1997, the majority of the Blumberger forest from the state and take over its management.

Other branches became landowners through marriage in West Germany, such as in 1974 at Bassenheim Castle (which made the branch of the barons of Waldthausen-Osten a member of the Rhenish Knights), and in 1978 at the Edelhof Ricklingen in Hanover.

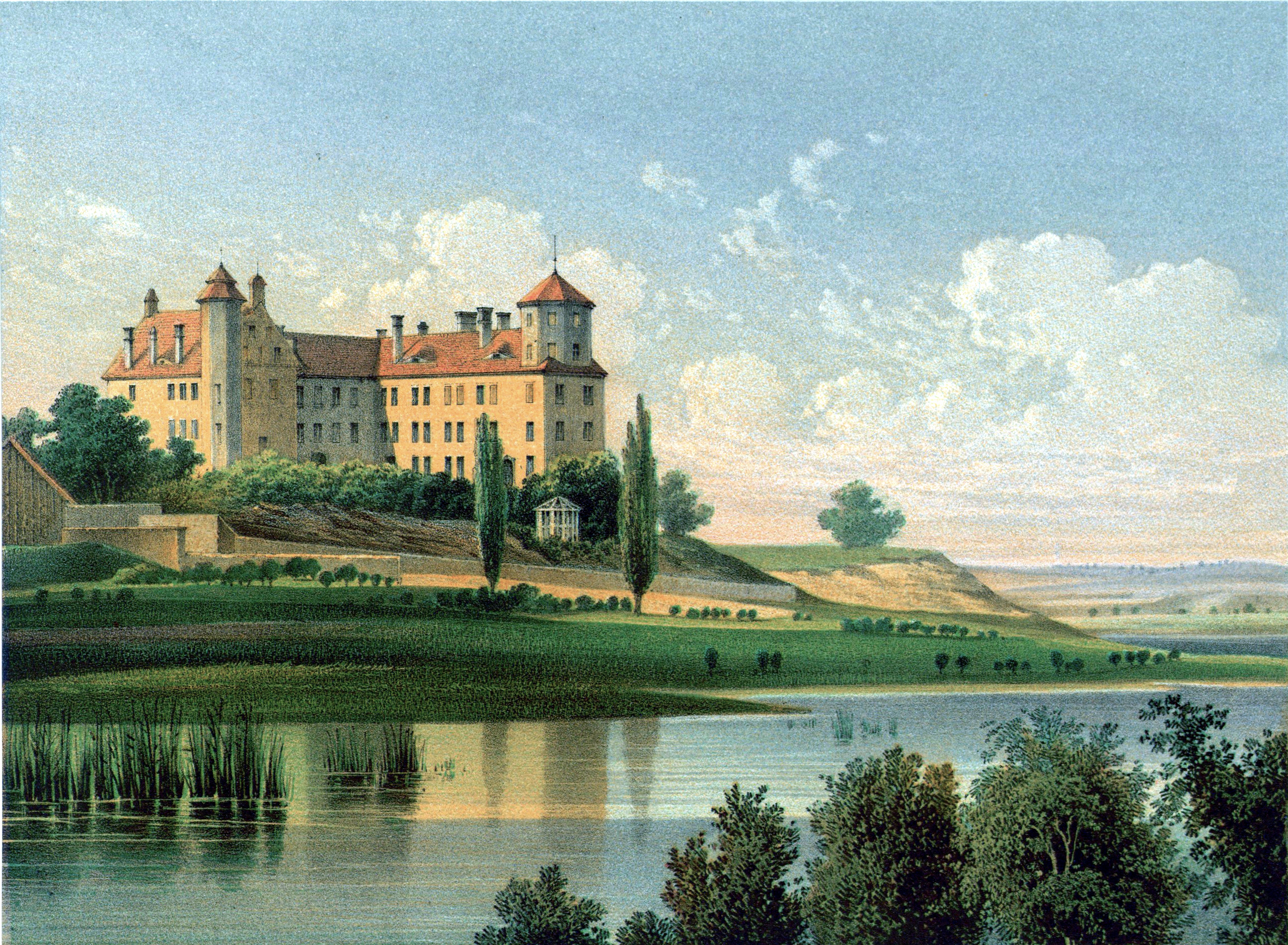
Schloss Penkun

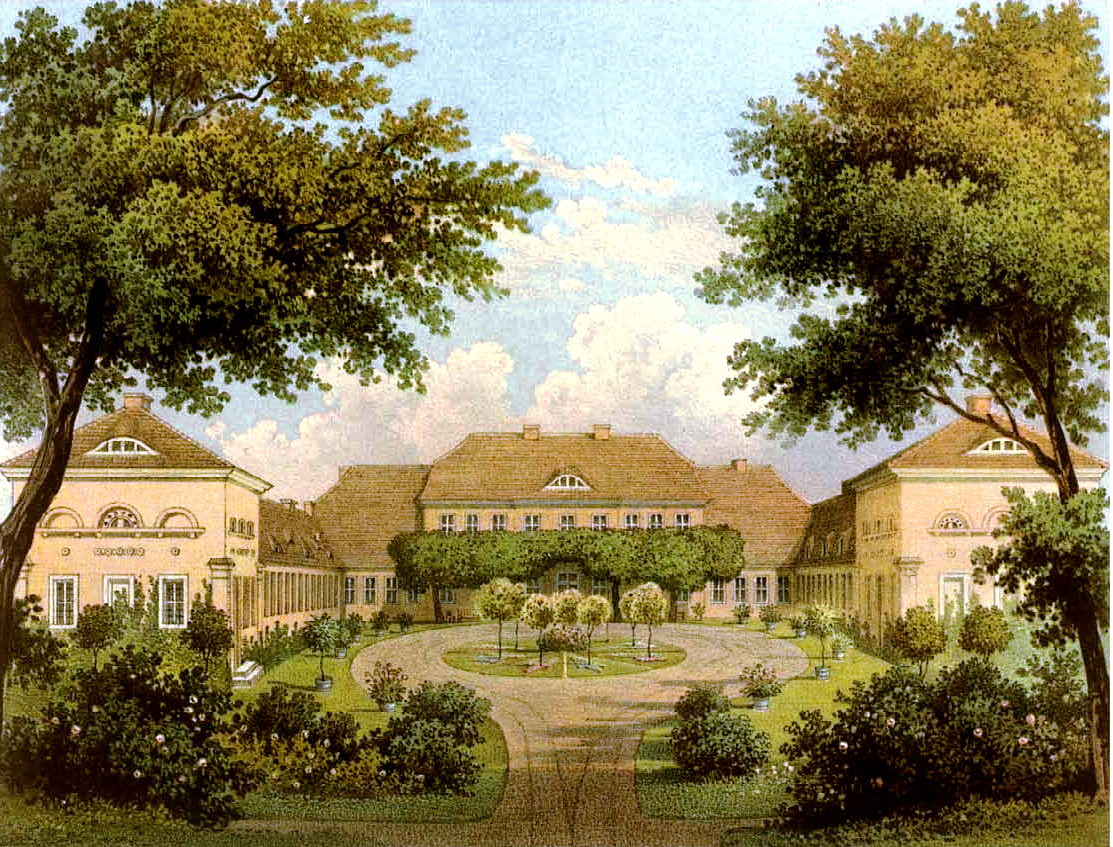
Gut Blumberg

In the registration book of the Dobbertin monastery, there are six entries from daughters of the von der Osten families from Karstorf and Plathe from 1713 to 1866 for admission to the noble ladies' convent.

=== Von der Osten-Sacken ===
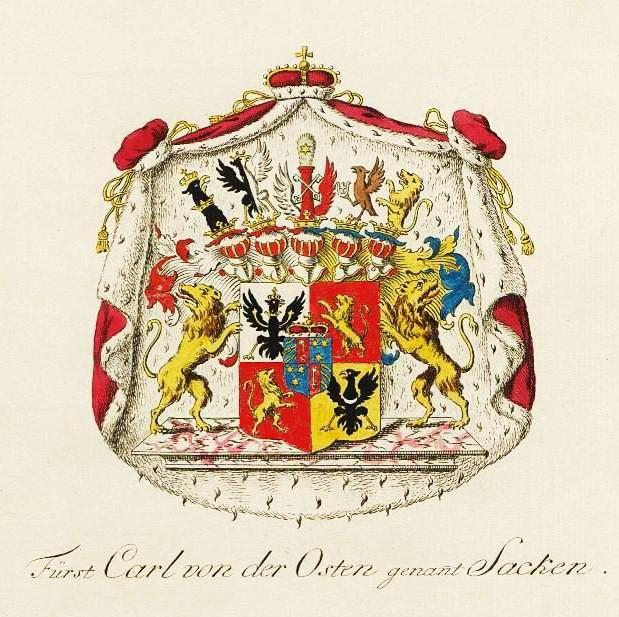
Princely Coat of Arms of the House von der Osten-Sacken

The family of von der Osten, also known as Sacken, spread in the Baltic region since the 13th century. It belongs to the Baltic nobility and traces its roots back to Arnoldus dictus Lyndale, who was granted Haus and Gebiet Sacken (later the Kirchspiel Sacken) by Bishop Otto of Kurland in 1386. In 1395, he is documented as Arnoldus de Sacken with the granting of Erkuln and Goldingen. The Sackens were wealthy large landowners, primarily in the Livonian and Courland Knighthood.

Sander von Sacken, also known as von der Oest, first appears with the combined name in 1544, which later led to the name and coat of arms unification of the two families as von der Osten gen. Sacken, without a tribal connection being able to be proven. As the Osten-Sackens had a well-known name in Russia, for example, Ludwig von der Osten from Pomerania, who served as an officer in Russian services, made use of their name.

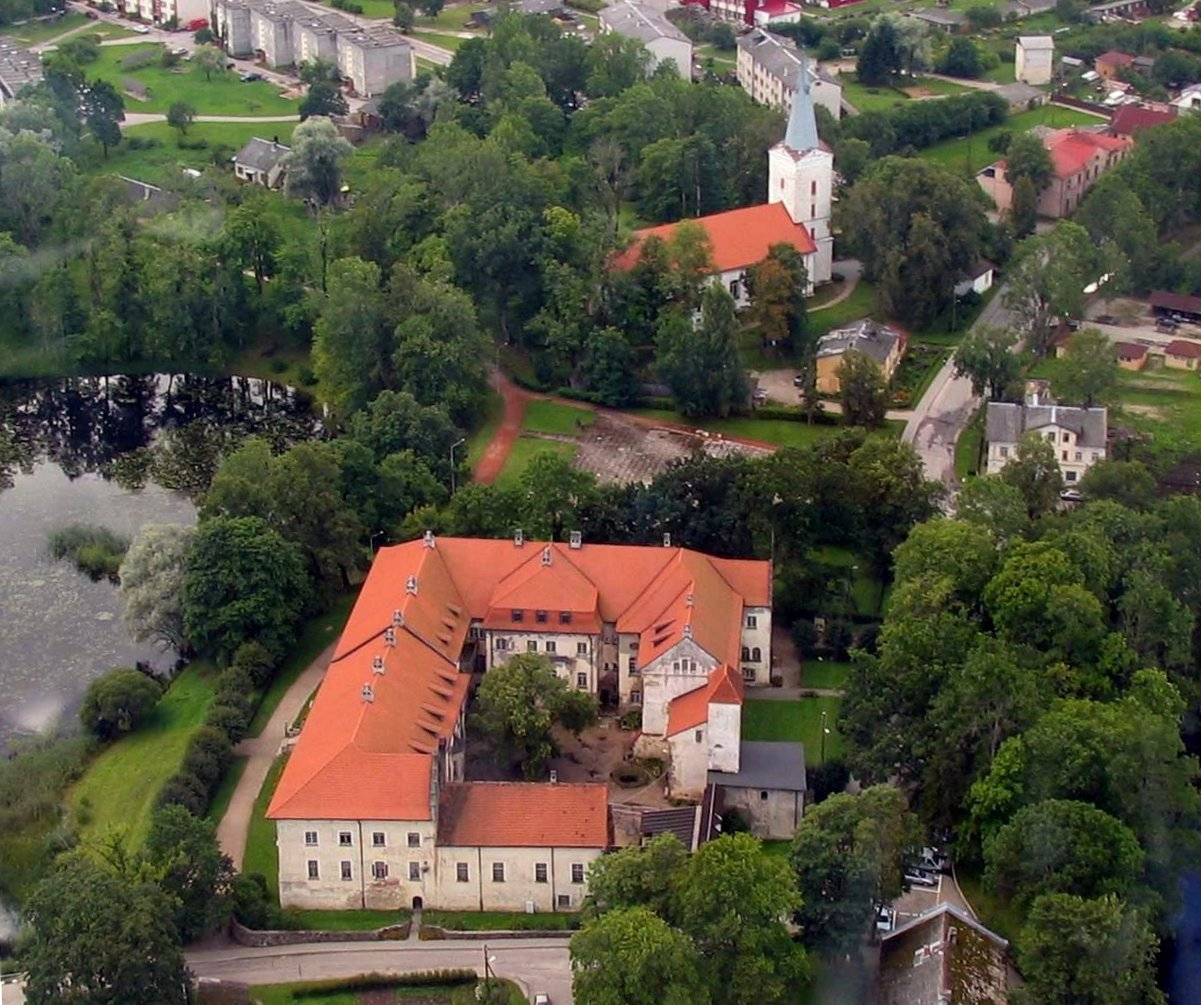
Castle Dondangen (Dundaga)

The Osten-Sacken holdings included Appricken (Apriķi) and Paddern in the Hasenpoth district; Dondangen, Groß- and Klein-Bathen, Lehnen, Pilten, Sareicken and Sackenmünde in the Duchy of Kurland and Semgallen; Schnepeln, Suhr, Seemuppen, Pewicken, Pelzen (all in Kurland).

Dondangen was initially owned by Diedrich von Maydell, who was married to Anna Sibylla von der Osten-Sacken. As the marriage was childless, the widow passed on the estate to her nephew Prince Carl Prince von der Osten gen. Sacken.

As a result of the collapse of the Russian Empire, the independent republics of Estonia, Latvia, and Lithuania emerged in 1918. The Latvian War of Independence against Soviet Russia was supported by Estonians and German-Baltics (Baltic Landeswehr, Iron Division), followed by a failed coup attempt by the German-Baltic minority, and then a Latvian government, which expropriated the German-Baltic large landowners through the Latvian land reform of 1919/1920, leading to the emigration of many German-Baltics, including many members of the Osten-Sacken family, to the Reich. Paul Freiherr von der Osten-Sacken returned to Kurland in 1924. 70 family members joined the National Socialist German Workers' Party (NSDAP) in the Third Reich, including 20 before the rise to power.

== Noble elevation ==
Several elevations have taken place, including the elevation to the rank of baron, Reichgraf, Prussian, Polish, and Russian count, and prince. The following probands are merely selected individual examples:

- Adolph Siegfried von der Osten was granted a Polish count's diploma on 29 October 1768.
- Carl von der Osten-Sacken was elevated to the rank of count by Emperor Franz I in 1762 and to the rank of prince by King Friedrich Wilhelm II in 1786.
- Fabian Gottlieb von der Osten-Sacken was elevated to the rank of Russian count in 1821 and to the rank of prince in 1832.
- Karl Ludwig August Franz von der Osten was elevated to the rank of Prussian count in 1888 in connection with the ownership of Plathe.

== Right to present to the Prussian House of Lords ==
King Friedrich Wilhelm IV granted the family the right to present themselves to the Prussian House of Lords in 1855. The family was thus one of the ten families that received this right during the early phase of the House of Lords in 1854/1855.

On presentation of the association of the Pomeranian noble family of von der Osten, members of the family sat in the House of Lords:

- 1856-1878: Julius von der Osten (*1808; †1878), owner of a manor
- 1878-1898: Alexander von der Osten (*1839; †1898), owner of a manor and director general of the general countryside
- 1899-1916: Leopold Count von der Osten (*1841; †1916), owner of a fideicommiss.

== Coat of arms ==
The coat of arms of the Osten family is divided. On the right it shows three diagonal silver wave bars in blue and on the left, in red, a vertically standing silver key with its handle facing to the left. The wave bars are meant to symbolize the Oste river (according to another view, the three Elbe tributaries Oste, Lühe and Schwinge), and the upright key represents the Archdiocese of Bremen. On the helmet in the black open eagle flight are two crossed golden keys in front of a column adorned with three peacock feathers and adorned with a silver star. The helmet covers are silver-red on the right and silver-blue on the left.

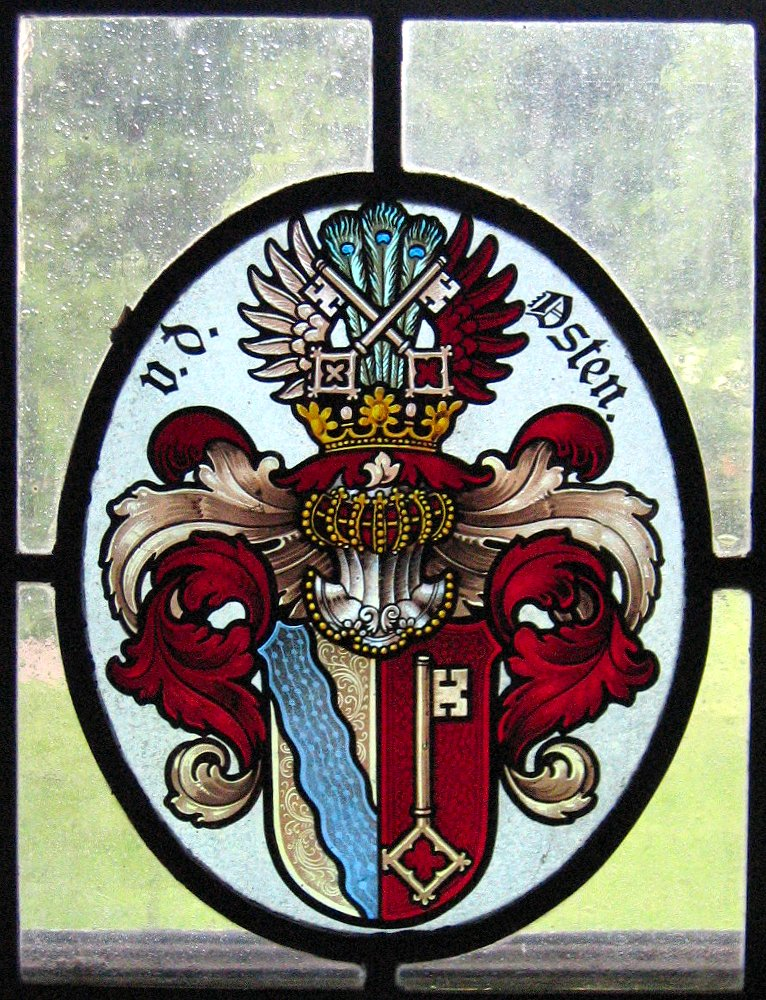
Coat of arms in Schloss Hollwinkel

The coat of arms of the von Sacken family, later von der Osten-Sacken, shows three six-pointed golden stars (2:1) on a blue background; later quartered with the coat of arms of the von der Osten. For the Prussian princely coat of arms: the quartered coat of arms with princely hat as the main shield on a quartered coat of arms with a black Prussian eagle on a silver ground (1), a golden lion on a red ground (2 and 3), and a black eagle on a golden ground (4). For the Russian princely coat of arms: the main coats of arms of Osten and Sacken quartered, with a black double-headed eagle on gold in the main shield.

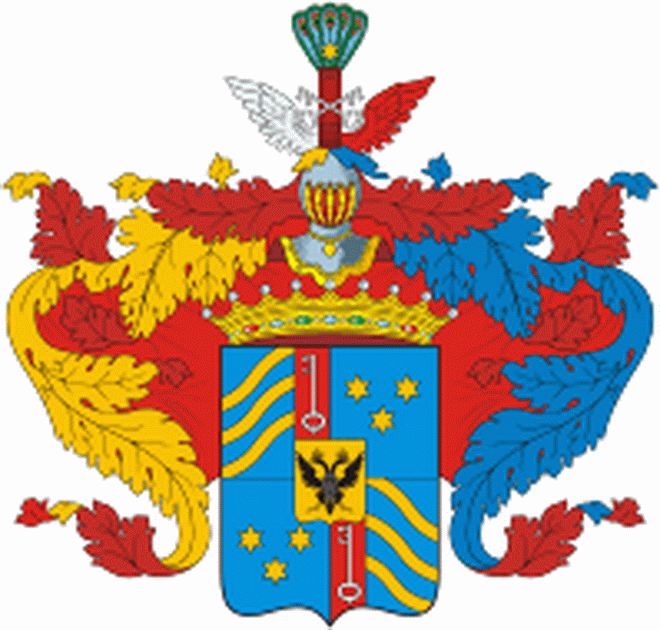
Coat of arms of von der Osten-Sacken

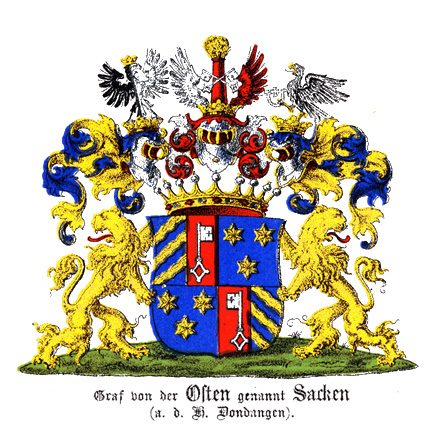
Countly coat of arms of Osten-Sacken

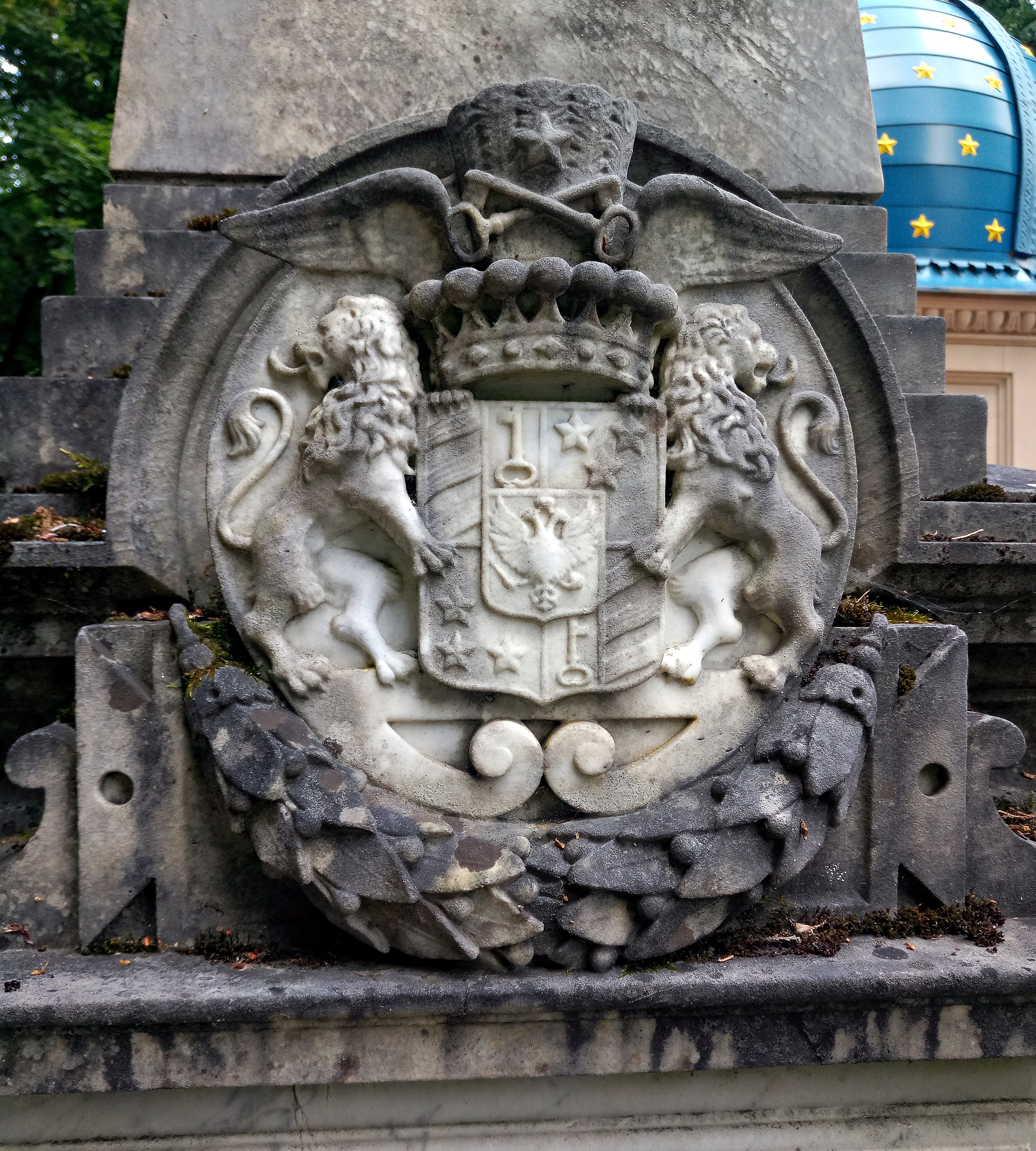
Coat of arms von der Osten-Sacken, Russischer Friedhof Wiesbaden

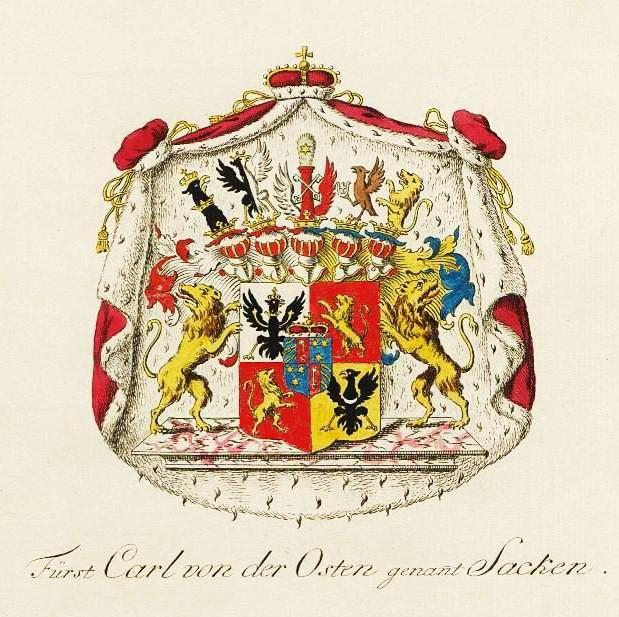
Princely coat of arms von der Osten genannt Sacken (1786)

== Notable family members ==
=== Von der Osten ===
- Adolph Sigfried von der Osten (1726–1796), Danish Minister
- Aegidius Christoph von der Osten (1661–1741), County Commissioner of the Neustettin district
- Albert von der Osten (1811–1887), Prussian Major General
- Alexander von der Osten (1839–1898), Estate owner, Member of the German Reichstag
- Alexander Friedrich von der Osten (1668–1736), Prussian Minister and Chamber President
- August von der Osten (full first name: Georg August), Prussian County Commissioner (Regenwalde)
- August von der Osten (1855–1895), Prussian County Commissioner (Regenwalde)
- Betekin von der Osten-Driesen, Owner of the Driesen lordship, 1348 bailiff in the Neumark
- Carl von der Osten (Major General) (1844–1905), Württemberg Major General
- Carl Curt von der Osten (1672–1724), County Commissioner of the Osten and Blücher districts
- Carl Friedrich von der Osten (1795–1878), Russian Major General
- Carl Henrik von der Osten († 1691), Danish Quartermaster General
- Casimir Gerhard von der Osten (1708–1773), County Commissioner of the Neustettin district
- Christian Friedrich von der Osten (1740–1819), Prussian Major General
- Christian Georg von der Osten (1674–1735), Danish General
- Christoph Friedrich von der Osten (1714–1777), County Commissioner of the Osten and Blücher districts
- Dinnies von der Osten (~1414–1477), Pomeranian knight and military leader
- Dorothea von der Osten (1896–1985), German photographer
- Eduard von der Osten (1804–1887), Prussian General
- Emil von der Osten (1848–1905), German theater actor and writer
- Eva von der Osten (1881–1936), German singer
- Felix von der Osten (1852–1927), Prussian Lieutenant General
- Friedrich von der Osten (officer) (1740–1819), German officer Friedrich von der Osten (singer) (1825–1881), German singer (tenor)
- Friedrich August Emil von der Osten (1781–1864), German lawyer and judge
- Friedrich Ludwig von der Osten (1741–1783), German lawyer and author
- Friedrich Wilhelm von der Osten (Major General) (1746–1830), Russian Major General
- Friedrich Wilhelm von der Osten (Chamberlain) (1721–1786), German chamberlain, genealogist and collector
- Friedrich Wilhelm von der Osten (politician) (1842–1928), German estate owner and politician
- Friedrich Wilhelm Alexander von Tschammer und Osten (1737–1809), German Major General
- George Julius Felix von der Osten (1745–1824), County Commissioner of the Osten district
- Gerhard von der Osten (1834–1921), Prussian Lieutenant General
- Gert von der Osten (1910–1983), German art historian and museum director
- Gustav von der Osten (1866–1923), German historian and regional researcher
- Gwendolin von der Osten (* 1971), Police President of the Göttingen Police Directorate
- Hans Henning von der Osten (1899–1960), German archaeologist
- Hedwig von der Osten (1613–1676), poet of Evangelical spiritual songs
- Heinrich von der Osten (1603–1659), Pomeranian county official
- Henning von der Osten (1563–1626), Pomeranian county official and administrator
- Margarete Lucia von der Osten (1651–1726), county official and founder of the Osten-Manteuffel Scholarship
- Jakob Friedrich von der Osten (1717–1796), Danish General
- Johan Vibe von der Osten (1708–1800), Danish General
- Johann Dietrich von der Osten (1709–1782), 1750-1762 Provisor and 1762-1768 head of the Dobbertin Monastery, wanted by the authorities in 1786, imprisoned in the Dömitz Fortress 1771-1773
- Julius von der Osten (1808–1878), Pomeranian estate owner and politician
- Julius Rudolf von der Osten (1801–1861), Prussian county official
- Kurt Moritz Lebrecht von der Osten (1815–1888), Prussian district councilor and captain
- Leonie von der Osten (1878–1963), second wife of August von Mackensen
- Leopold von der Osten (General) (1788–1853), Prussian Major General
- Leopold von der Osten (Landrat) (1809–1887), German estate owner and county official
- Leopold von der Osten (Politician) (1841–1916), German hereditary lord and politician
- Ludwig von der Osten (Osten-Sacken; 1710–1756), Russian, then Prussian colonel, eventually Saxon Major General
- Matthias Conrad von der Osten (1691–1748), Secret Financial Advisor and President of the Kurmark War and Domain Chamber in Berlin
- Oskar von der Osten (1862–1942), Prussian county official, President of the House of Representatives
- Otto von der Osten (1772–1841), Prussian Major General
- Otto Friedrich von der Osten (1748–1818), Danish Major General
- Peter Christoph von der Osten (1659–1730), Danish court official and governor
- Rudolf von der Osten (1865–1943), Prussian Major General
- Stoislaff von der Osten († 1665), court steward of the Duke of Schleswig-Holstein-Sonderburg
- Ulrich von der Osten (* 1965), German journalist and television host
- Ulrike von der Osten (* 1962), German painter
- Valentin Bodo von der Osten (1699–1757), Prussian colonel of artillery
- Vali von der Osten (1882–1923), German singer
- Walther von der Osten (1863–1925), Prussian Lieutenant General
- Wedig von der Osten (1859–1923), Prussian district councilor and politician
- Wilhelm von der Osten (1824–1895), Prussian Lieutenant General

=== Von der Osten-Sacken ===
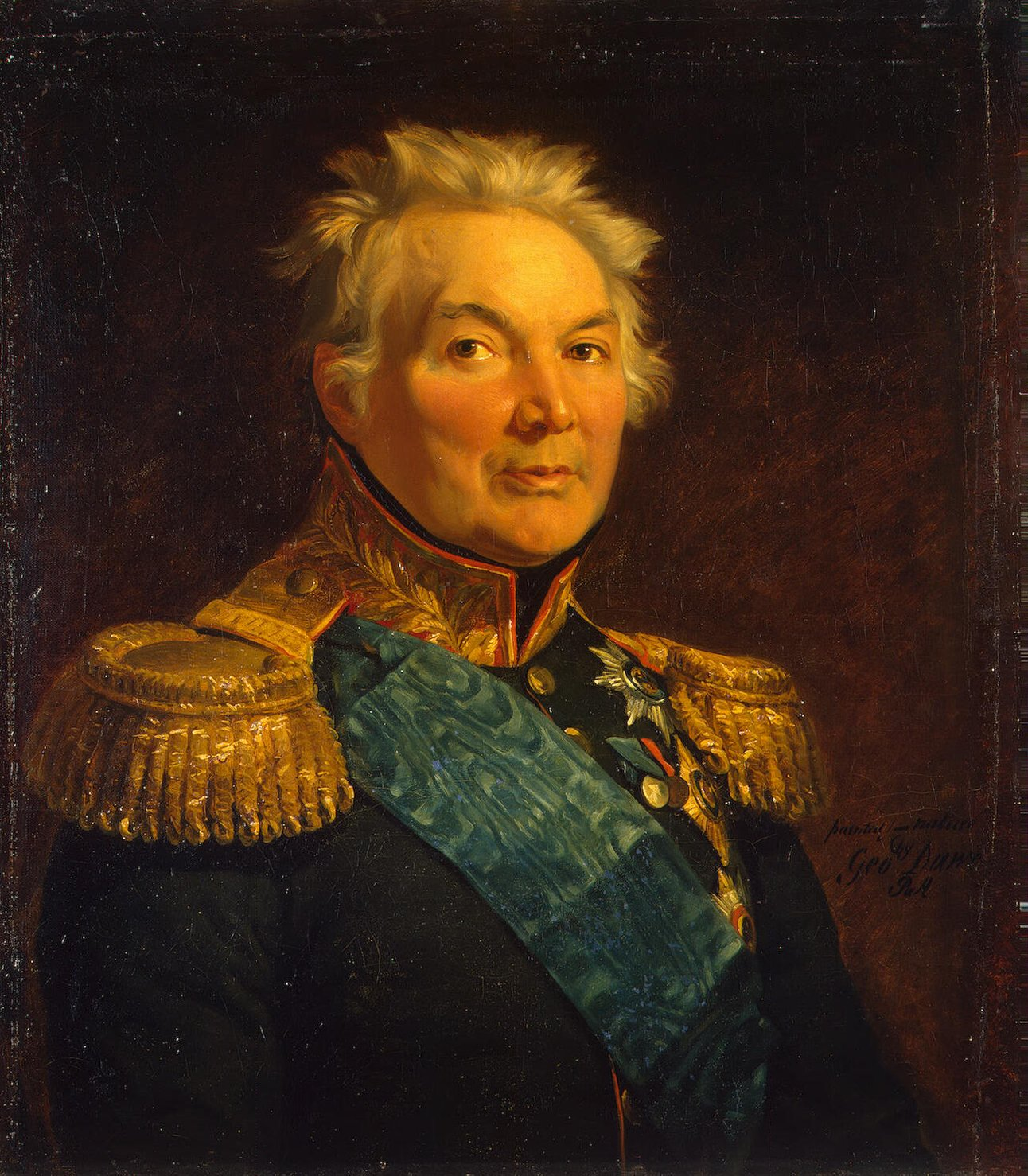
Prince Fabian Gottlieb von der Osten-Sacken (1752–1837), Russian Field Marshal

- Leo von der Osten-Sacken (1811–1895), Prussian Lieutenant General
- Arthur von der Osten-Sacken (1843–1912), German-Baltic estate owner and politician
- Carl von der Osten-Sacken (1726–1794), Saxon cabinet minister and diplomat
- Carl Robert von der Osten-Sacken (1828–1906), Russian diplomat and entomologist
- Christian Friedrich Wilhelm von der Osten (1741–1793), district administrator of Deutsch Krone
- Christiane Princess von der Osten-Sacken (1733–1811), early capitalist entrepreneur (she was considered the richest woman in Prussia at the time)
- Christoph Friedrich von der Osten-Sacken (1697–1759), Livonian senior counselor, chancellor, estate manager, and regent of the Duchy of Courland and Semigallia
- Dmitri von der Osten-Sacken (1789–1881), Russian general
- Ewald von der Osten-Sacken († 1718), Livonian chancellor, senior counselor, and district administrator
- Fabian Gottlieb von der Osten-Sacken (1752–1837), Russian field marshal
- Maria von der Osten-Sacken (1901-1985), German screenwriter and film producer
- Nikolai von der Osten-Sacken (1831–1912), Russian diplomat
- Paul Freiherr von der Osten-Sacken (1880–1934), German historian and archivist
- Peter von der Osten-Sacken (Astronomer) (1909–2008), German astronomer and physicist
- Peter von der Osten-Sacken (Theologian) (1940–2022), German Protestant theologian and university professor
- Reinhold Friedrich von der Osten-Sacken (1792–1864), Russian civil servant
- Stanislaus von der Osten gen. Sacken († 1863), Russian Major General
- Thomas von der Osten-Sacken (* 1968), journalist
- Werner von der Osten-Sacken (1821–1889), Prussian Lieutenant General
- Wilhelm von der Osten-Sacken (1769–1846), Prussian Lieutenant General

== Literature ==
- Horst Alsleben: Dobbertiner Klosterhauptmann steckbrieflich gesucht. Johann Dietrich von der Osten landete im 18. Jahrhundert wegen betrügerischen Konkurses in der Festung Dömitz. In: Mitteilungen des Vereins für mecklenburgische Familien- und Personengeschichte e. V., Heft 42 (2019), S. 18–21.
- Deutsche Adelsgenossenschaft (Hrsg.): Jahrbuch des Deutschen Adels. Band 2, Verlag von W. T. Bruer, Berlin 1898, S. 692 ff (Osten) – Digitalisat und S. 749 ff (Osten-Sacken) – Digitalisat
- Johann Samuel Ersch, Johann Gottfried Gruber (Hrsg.): Allgemeine Encyklopädie der Wissenschaften und Künste. Section III, Band 6, Brockhaus, Leipzig 1835, S. 463–468. (Volltext)
- Genealogisches Handbuch des Adels. Adelslexikon. Band X, Band 119 der Gesamtreihe GHdA, C. A. Starke, Limburg an der Lahn 1999, ISSN 0435-2408, S. 69–78.
- Genealogisches Handbuch des Adels. C. A. Starke, Glücksburg/Ostsee 1958, S. 321–322; 1959, S. 527–529; Limburg an der Lahn 1965, S. 194–232; 1976, S. 295–297; 1973, S. 311–316; 1985, S. 242–286 und 1992, S. 235–372.
- Genealogisches Handbuch der baltischen Ritterschaften. Estland, Teil 2.3, Görlitz 1930, S. 344–345 (Volltext) Osten
- Genealogisches Handbuch der Oeselschen Ritterschaft. 1935, S. 250–260 (Volltext) Osten-Sacken
- Gothaisches Genealogisches Taschenbuch der Adeligen Häuser. Gotha, Justus Perthes, AA, 1900 St., v. der Osten (Erg. 1900–1939), ab Jg. 1 ff. 1900/S. 668ff., 1906/S.542ff (Osten-Fabeck)
- Gothaisches genealogisches Taschenbuch der freiherrlichen Häuser. Gotha, Justus Perthes, 1859, S. 554 ff.
- Otto Grotefend: Geschichte des Geschlechts v. d. Osten. 1. Band, H. A. Ludwig Degener, Leipzig 1914. 2. Urkundenbuch. Erster Halbband des zweiten Bandes, 1401–1500. Herrcke & Lebeling, Stettin 1923./23. (Übersicht)
- Otto Titan von Hefner: Stammbuch des blühenden und abgestorbenen Adels in Deutschland: Herausgegeben von einigen deutschen Edelleuten. Band 3, Georg Joseph Manz, Regensburg 1865, S. 121–122. (Volltext)
- Robert Klempin, Gustav Kratz: Matrikeln und Verzeichnisse der Pommerschen Ritterschaft vom XIV bis in das XIX Jahrhundert. A. Bath, Berlin 1863 (Volltext)
- Ernst Heinrich Kneschke: Neues allgemeines deutsches Adels-Lexicon. Band 7, Friedrich Voigt, Leipzig 1867, S. 5–8 (Volltext)
- Gerlinde Kraus: Christiane Fürstin von der Osten-Sacken. Franz Steiner Verlag, Stuttgart 2001, S. 43 ff. (eingeschränkte Vorschau)
- Leopold von Ledebur: Adelslexikon der preußischen Monarchie. Berlin 1856, Band 2, S. 171–172 (Volltext)
- von der Osten: Urkunde, betreffend die Lehnsstiftung zum Besten des Schloßgesessenen Geschlechts von der Osten. Großgebauer, Celle 1873 Digitized
- Armin von der Osten gen. Sacken und Gerhard von der Osten: Die Herkunft des uradeligen, schloß- und burggesessenen, pommerschen Geschlechts von der Osten. Hoefer, Blankenburg 1912.
- Armin von der Osten gen. Sacken: Ehe-Bündnisse des pommerschen schloßgesessenen Geschlechts von der Osten und des kurländischen Geschlechts der Freiherren von der Osten genannt Sacken. In: VJH 25, 1897, S. 135–195, 239–302.
- Armin von der Osten gen. Sacken: Nachrichten über Herkunft, Verzweigung und Wappen derer von der Osten und von der Osten gen. Sacken. Mittler, Berlin 1893.
- Christian von der Osten gen. Sacken: Das Testament des Dietrich von Sacken auf Lehnen vom Jahre 1668. In: Jahrbuch für Genealogie, Heraldik und Sphragistik. Jahrgang 1896, S. 82–87.
- Martin Sandberger: Familie von der Osten. In: Südwestdeutsche Blätter für Familien- u. Wappenkunde 20. 1991–1993, S. 473–475.
- Hans Wätjen: Geschichte des Geschlechts von der Osten. Ein pommersches Geschlecht im Wandel der Jahrhunderte. Hrsg. Vorstand des Familienverbandes, Eigenverlag, Band 1, Georg Westermann, Braunschweig 1960, Band 2, Bremen 1977.
- Wolf Lüdeke von Weltzien: Die von der Osten in Mecklenburg von 1303 bis 1788. In: Familien aus Mecklenburg u. Vorpommern 2. 1991, S. 173–192.
- Wolf Lüdeke von Weltzien: Die Grafen von der Osten genannt Sacken und von Hessenstein auf Bellin. In: Familien aus Mecklenburg u. Vorpommern 3. 1992, S. 149–150.
- Johann Heinrich Zedler (Hrsg.): Großes vollständiges Universal-Lexicon aller Wissenschaften und Künste. Band 25: O. Halle und Leipzig 1740, Spalten 2205–2257 (Volltext.)
- Leopold von Zedlitz-Neukirch: Neues preussisches Adelslexicon. Band 3, Gebrüder Reichenbach, Leipzig 1837, S. 485–487. (Volltext).

== Sources ==
- "Остен-Сакен, княжеский, графский и баронский род" . Brockhaus and Efron Encyclopedic Dictionary (in Russian). 1906.
- Francis L. Carsten: “Der Preußische Adel Und seine Stellung in Staat Und Gesellschaft bis 1945.” Geschichte und Gesellschaft. Sonderheft. Europäischer Adel 1750–1950. 13, Vandenhoeck & Ruprecht, Göttingen 1990, S. 25–112.
- ↑ Hartwin Spenkuch: . Droste, Düsseldorf 1998, ISBN 978-3-7700-5203-5, S. 174.
- ↑ Klempin, Kratz: Matrikeln und Verzeichnisse der Pommerschen Ritterschaft. S. 49, 104.
- ↑ Hamburger Urkundenbuch I. Nr. 434
- ↑ Arthur Conrad Förste: Die Ministerialen der Grafschaft Stade im Jahre 1219 und ihre Familien. Stade 1975, S. 20–23.
- ↑ ^{Hochspringen nach: a} ^{b} Otto Grotefend: Geschichte des Geschlechts v. der Osten. Urkundenbuch 1, Leipzig 1914, S. 1–3, Nr. 2, 6–7.
- ↑ Wolfgang Fuhrmann: Die Burg Osten an der Tollense. Geros-Verlag, Neubrandenburg 2000, ISBN 3-935721-08-0, S. 6.
- ↑ ^{Hochspringen nach: a} ^{b} Johann Heinrich Zedler et al. (Hrsg.): Grosses vollständiges Universal-Lexicon aller Wissenschafften und Künste. Band 28, Halle und Leipzig 1741, Spalten 682–683. (https://books.google.de/books?id=_pdBAAAAcAAJ&pg=PA684#v=onepage&q&f=false).
- ↑ Bundesarchiv Potsdam RK Nr. 1065, Blätter 45 ff, und rep. 89 Nr. 296
- ↑ GHdA. Adelslexikon. Band X, S. 73–74.
- ↑ Kurländisches Haus Фон дер Остен-Сакен (Memento des Originals vom 17. Juli 2011 im Internet Archive) Info: Der Archivlink wurde automatisch eingesetzt und noch nicht geprüft. Bitte prüfe Original- und Archivlink gemäß Anleitung und entferne dann diesen Hinweis. (russisch)
- ↑ Stephan Malinowski: Vom König zum Führer. Sozialer Niedergang und politische Radikalisierung im deutschen Adel zwischen Kaiserreich und NS-Staat. 3. Auflage, Akademie Verlag, Berlin 2003, S. 573, ISBN 978-3-05-004070-7
- ↑ Nicolai von Essen: Genealogisches Handbuch der Oeselschen Ritterschaft, Hrsg. Oeselschen Gemeinnützigen Verbände, Reprint der Ausgabe Tartu 1935, Hannover-Döhren, 1971. S. 251, 1. Absatz
- ↑ Karl Ludwig August Franz von der Osten. In: Marcelli Janecki, Deutsche Adelsgenossenschaft (Hrsg.): . Zweiter Band. W. T. Bruer’s Verlag, Berlin 1898, S. 709 (dlib.rsl.ru).
- ↑ ^{Hochspringen nach: a} ^{b} E. David (Hrsg.): Handbuch für das Preußische Herrenhaus. Berlin 1911, S. 227 (Online).
- ↑ E. David (Hrsg.): Handbuch für das Preußische Herrenhaus. Carl Heymanns Verlag, Berlin 1911, S. 346 f. (Online).
- ↑ Familiengeschichte bei Schloss-Blumberg.de
- ↑ E. Holm: In: Carl Frederik Bricka (Hrsg.): Dansk biografisk Lexikon. Tillige omfattende Norge for Tidsrummet 1537–1814. 1. Auflage. Band 12: Münch–Peirup. Gyldendalske Boghandels Forlag, Kopenhagen 1898, S. 450–456 (dänisch, runeberg.org).
- ↑ H. W. Harbou: . In: Carl Frederik Bricka (Hrsg.): Dansk biografisk Lexikon. Tillige omfattende Norge for Tidsrummet 1537–1814. 1. Auflage. Band 12: Münch–Peirup. Gyldendalske Boghandels Forlag, Kopenhagen 1898, S. 457–458 (dänisch, runeberg.org).
- ↑ H. W. Harbou: . In: Carl Frederik Bricka (Hrsg.): Dansk biografisk Lexikon. Tillige omfattende Norge for Tidsrummet 1537–1814. 1. Auflage. Band 12: Münch–Peirup. Gyldendalske Boghandels Forlag, Kopenhagen 1898, S. 458–459 (dänisch, runeberg.org).
- ↑ C. O. Munthe: . In: Carl Frederik Bricka (Hrsg.): 1. Auflage. Band 12: Münch–Peirup. Gyldendalske Boghandels Forlag, Kopenhagen 1898, S. 461–462 (dänisch, runeberg.org).
- ↑ Louis Bobé: . In: Carl Frederik Bricka (Hrsg.): Dansk biografisk Lexikon. Tillige omfattende Norge for Tidsrummet 1537–1814. 1. Auflage. Band 12: Münch–Peirup. Gyldendalske Boghandels Forlag, Kopenhagen 1898, S. 462 (dänisch, runeberg.org).
