= Berg Publishers =

British publishing company (1983–2013)

- Status: Defunct (2013)
- Founded: 1983
- Founder: Marion Berghahn
- Successor: Bloomsbury Publishing
- Country of origin: United Kingdom
- Headquarters location: Oxford
- Distribution: Macmillan Publishers (Except United States), Palgrave Macmillan (United States)
- Publication types: Books, academic journals
- Fiction genres: Academic books, journals
- Official website: www.bergpublishers.com

Berg Publishers was an academic publishing company based in Oxford, Oxfordshire, England and Providence, Rhode Island, United States. It was founded in the United Kingdom in 1983 by Marion Berghahn. Berg published monographs, textbooks, reference works, and academic journals. It focused on fashion, design, anthropology, history, and cultural studies. Operations in Providence began shortly after Berghahn's husband, historian Volker Berghahn, accepted a chair at Brown University in 1988.

== History ==
In 2003, Berg Publishers was bought from its owners by its managers Kathryn Earle and Sara Everett. The original owner, Marion Berghahn, was forced out in 1994 and immediately founded Berghahn Books, a leading academic publisher in the fields of anthropology and social sciences.

The Book Industry Communication (BIC), a trade standards group for electronic commerce and supply chain efficiency, awarded Berg its BIC Product Data Excellence Gold Award in 2007–2008 and its e4books project accredited Berg in 2008. Berg won the Independent Publishers Guild's 2008 Publishing Technology E-Publishing Award for its collection of profitable digital strategies in March 2008.

By March 2008, Berg had published thirteen journals. In September 2008, Bloomsbury Publishing bought Berg Publishers for £3,000,000 (US$3,569,535). Since 2013, all Berg titles have been published under the Bloomsbury name (under the imprint Bloomsbury Academic).
