= Janet Carsten =

Anthropologist

Janet Carsten FBA, FRSE
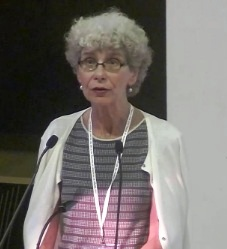
- Occupations: Professor of Social and Cultural Anthropology

Janet Carsten FBA FRSE is an anthropologist and professor currently employed at the University of Edinburgh. Carsten studies social and cultural anthropology. She is the daughter of the British historian Francis Ludwig Carsten.

== Research and career ==
Carsten has conducted research in Malaysia and Britain. After completing her PhD at the London School of Economics, she was a Post-doctoral Research Fellow at the University of Cambridge, and Lecturer at the University of Manchester. She has given guest lectures and keynote addresses at Johns Hopkins University, the National University of Taiwan, UCLA, the University of Copenhagen, the Ecole des Hautes Etudes en Sciences Sociales, University of Michigan, University of Toronto, the University of Sao Paulo, and at the Museu Nacional, Federal University of Rio de Janeiro. She delivered the Lewis Henry Morgan Lecture in 2012. During a three-year Leverhulme Major Research Fellowship from September 2007-10 she conducted research on articulations between popular and medical ideas about blood in Britain and Malaysia.

Carsten is a Fellow of the Royal Society of Edinburgh and the British Academy. In 2023, she was elected a member of the Academia Europaea. Carsten is currently a Professor of Social and Cultural Anthropology at the University of Edinburgh.

== Published works ==
=== Books ===
- 2021 Marriage in Past, Present and Future Tense. (Edited with H-Chiu, S.Magee, E.Papadaki, K.Reece). UCL Press.
- 2019 Blood Work: Life and Laboratories in Penang. Duke University Press. Introduction
- 2018 Reason and Passion: The Parallel Worlds of Ethnography and Biography (edited with Sophie Day and Charles Stafford). Special Issue, Social Anthropology, Vol. 26 No.1
- 2013 Blood Will Out: Essays on Liquid Transfers and Flows (edited). Special Issue, Journal of the Royal Anthropological Institute, Vol. 19, and separate book publication, Wiley Blackwell.
- 2007 Ghosts of Memory: Essays on Remembrance and Relatedness (edited). Blackwell.
- 2004 After Kinship. Cambridge University Press.
- 2000 Cultures of Relatedness: New Approaches to the Study of Kinship (edited). Cambridge University Press.
- 1997 The Heat of the Hearth: The Process of Kinship in a Malay Fishing Community. Oxford: Clarendon Press.
- 1995 About the House: Lévi-Strauss and Beyond (edited with Stephen Hugh-Jones). Cambridge University Press.
