= Volker Berghahn =

German historian

- Born: Volker Rolf Berghahn; 15 February 1938 (age 88); Berlin, Germany
- Education: University of London; University of North Carolina
- Scientific career
- Fields: Modern history
- Workplaces: Columbia University
- Doctoral advisor: Francis L. Carsten

Volker Rolf Berghahn (born 15 February 1938) is a historian of German and modern European history at Columbia University. His research interests have included the fin de siècle period in Europe, the origins of World War I, and German-American relations. He received a M.A. from the University of North Carolina at Chapel Hill in 1961 and a PhD, under supervision of Francis L. Carsten, from the University of London in 1964. Prior to teaching in the United States, Berghahn worked in the United Kingdom and Germany. In 1988, he accepted a position at Brown University, and moved to Columbia ten years later.

Berghahn now holds the chair of Seth Low Professor of History at Columbia, and is also a Fellow of the Royal Historical Society.

== Bibliography ==
- Der Stahlhelm. Bund der Frontsoldaten 1918–1935. 1966.
- Der Tirpitz-Plan (1971)
- Germany And The Approach Of War In 1914 (1973)
- Germany in the Age of Total War (with Martin Kitchen), (London: Croom Helm; Totowa N.J.: Barnes and Noble, 1981)
- Modern Germany (1982)
- The Americanization of West German Industry, 1945–1973 (1986)
- Imperial Germany: 1871–1914 economy, society, culture, and politics (1994)
- Quest for Economic Empire, ed. (1996)
- Der Untergang des alten Europas, 1900–1929 (1999)
- America and the Intellectual Cold Wars in Europe (2001)
- Der Erste Weltkrieg (2003)
- Europe in the Era of Two World Wars: From Militarism and Genocide to Civil Society, 1900–1950 (English translation 2005)
- Gibt es einen deutschen Kapitalismus? Tradition und globale Perspektiven der sozialen Marktwirtschaft (2006)
- "A plea for a rapprochement between history and economic history : Helmut Schmidt Prize Lecture at the German Historical Institute, February 14, 2007". Bulletin of the German Historical Institute. 40: 83–90. Spring 2007.
- Industriegesellschaft und Kulturtransfer: Die deutsch-amerikanischen Beziehungen im 20. Jahrhundert. Göttingen: Vandenhoeck & Ruprecht, 2010, ISBN 978-3-525-37013-1
- Umbau im Wiederaufbau: Amerika und die deutsche Industrie im 20. Jahrhundert. Göttingen: Wallstein, 2013, ISBN 978-3-8353-1306-4
- Journalists between Hitler and Adenauer: From Inner Emigration to the Moral Reconstruction of West Germany. Princeton, NJ: Princeton University Press, 2019, ISBN 978-0-691-17963-6
- Hans-Günther Sohl als Stahlunternehmer und Präsident des Bundesverbandes der Deutschen Industrie: 1906–1989. Göttingen: Wallstein, 2020, ISBN 978-3-8353-3852-4
