= Martin Kitchen =

British born historian of Germany

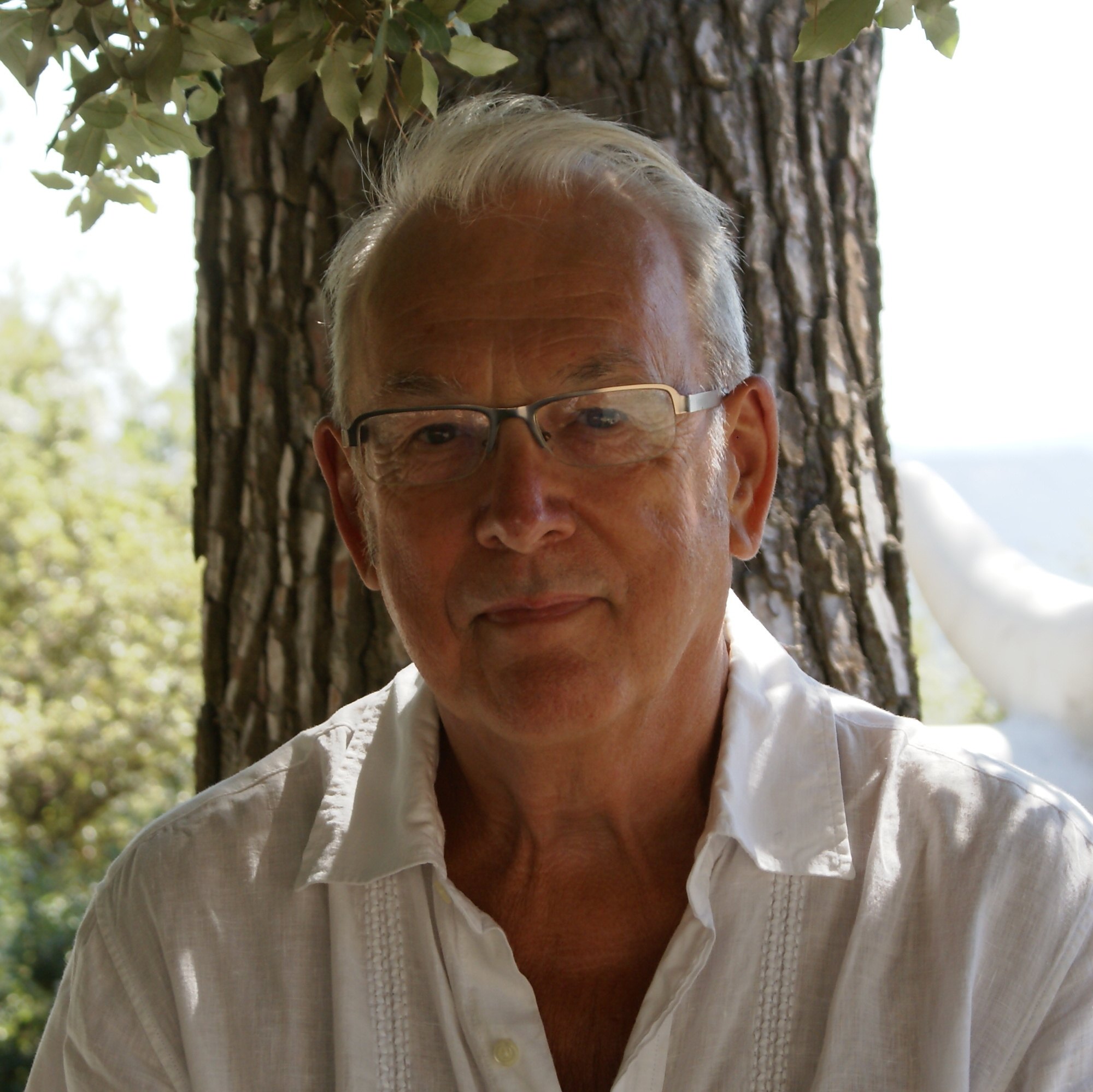
- Martin Kitchen (2009)

Personal details
- Born: 21 December 1936 (age 89) Nottingham, England
- Education: University of London
- Occupation: Professor of European History

Martin Kitchen (21 December 1936, Nottingham, England) is a British-Canadian historian, who has specialized in modern European history, with an emphasis on Germany. He is internationally regarded as a key author for the study of contemporary history.

Kitchen was educated at Magdalen College, Oxford, and the School of Slavonic and East European Studies at the University of London.

Now Professor Emeritus of history at Simon Fraser University, Kitchen started teaching in 1966. He also taught at the Cambridge Group for Population Studies (Cambridge University).

Throughout his career, Kitchen has served in several editorial boards such as the International History Review, the Canadian Journal of History / Annales canadiennes d'histoire and International Affairs. Kitchen's work has been translated into French, German, Polish, Portuguese, Spanish and Chinese.

== Fellowships and awards ==
Kitchen is a Fellow of the Royal Society of Canada and the Royal Historical Society. In 1978, he was awarded the Moncado Prize of The Society for Military History. In 1983-84, he received the Simon Fraser University Research Professor award.

== Reviews ==
Kitchen received the following reviews for Speer: Hitler's Architect, a biography of the Nazi war criminal Albert Speer. Writing in 2016 Roger Moorhouse for History Today said "Kitchen is brilliant and brutal, exposing every aspect of his subject’s story to stern scrutiny. He begins at the very start, showing that even Speer’s tale of his birth was a lie." The Kirkus Review said "Kitchen sets the record straight on Albert Speer’s assertions of ignorance of the Final Solution and claims to being the good Nazi." Jonathan Meades writing in the London Review of Books said "Speer: Hitler’s Architect is not a biography. It is a 200,000-word charge sheet. Kitchen is steely, dogged and attentive to the small print. He shows Speer no mercy, nailing his every exculpatory ruse and demonstrating time and again how provisional the notion of truth was to him."

== Books ==
- The Dominici Affair: Murder and Mystery in Provence (Lincoln, Nebraska: Potomac Books, 2017)
- Speer: Hitler's Architect, Description & Contents. (New Haven and London: Yale University Press, 2015)
- A History of Modern Germany: 1800 to the Present (2nd Edition), Wiley-Blackwell, 2011, ISBN 978-0-470-65581-8
- Rommel's Desert War: Waging World War II in North Africa, 1941–1943 (Cambridge: Cambridge University Press, 2009)
- The Third Reich: Charisma and Community (London: Longman, 2007)
- A History of Modern Germany, 1800–2000 (Oxford: Blackwell, 2006)
- Europe Between the Wars, 2nd extended edition (London: Longman, 2006)
- Nazi Germany: A Critical Introduction (Stroud: Tempus Publishing, 2004)
- The German Offensives of 1918 (Stroud, Tempus, 2001)
- Kaspar Hauser: Europe’s Child (London and New York: Palgrave, 2001)
- The Cambridge Illustrated History of Germany (Cambridge: Cambridge University Press, 1996)
- The British Empire and Commonwealth: A Short History (London: Macmillan, 1996)
- Nazi Germany at War (London: Longmans, 1994)
- Empire and After: A Short History of the British Empire and the Commonwealth (Vancouver: Simon Fraser University, 1994)
- A World in Flames: A Concise History of the Second World War in Europe and Asia (London: Longmans, 1990)
- Europe Between the Wars (London: Longmans, 1988)
- The Origins of the Cold War in Comparative Perspective (with Lawrence Aronsen), (London: Macmillan; New York: St. Martin's Press, 1988)
- British Policy Towards the Soviet Union, 1939–1945 (London: Macmillan; New York: St. Martin's, 1986)
- Germany in the Age of Total War (with Volker R. Berghahn), (London: Croom Helm; Totowa, NJ: Barnes & Noble, 1981)
- The Coming of Austrian Fascism (London: Croom Helm; Montreal: McGill-Queen's University Press, 1980)
- The Political Economy of Germany, 1815–1914 (London: Croom Helm; Montreal: McGill-Queen's University Press, 1978)
- Fascism (London: Macmillan, 1976)
- The Silent Dictatorship: The Politics of the German High Command, 1916–1918 (London: Croom Helm, 1976, ISBN 0-85664-301-7)
- A Military History of Germany: From the Eighteenth Century to the Present Day (London: Weidenfeld & Nicolson, 1975)
- The German Officer Corps, 1890–1914 (Oxford: Clarendon Press, 1968)
