= Dundaga =

Village in Latvia

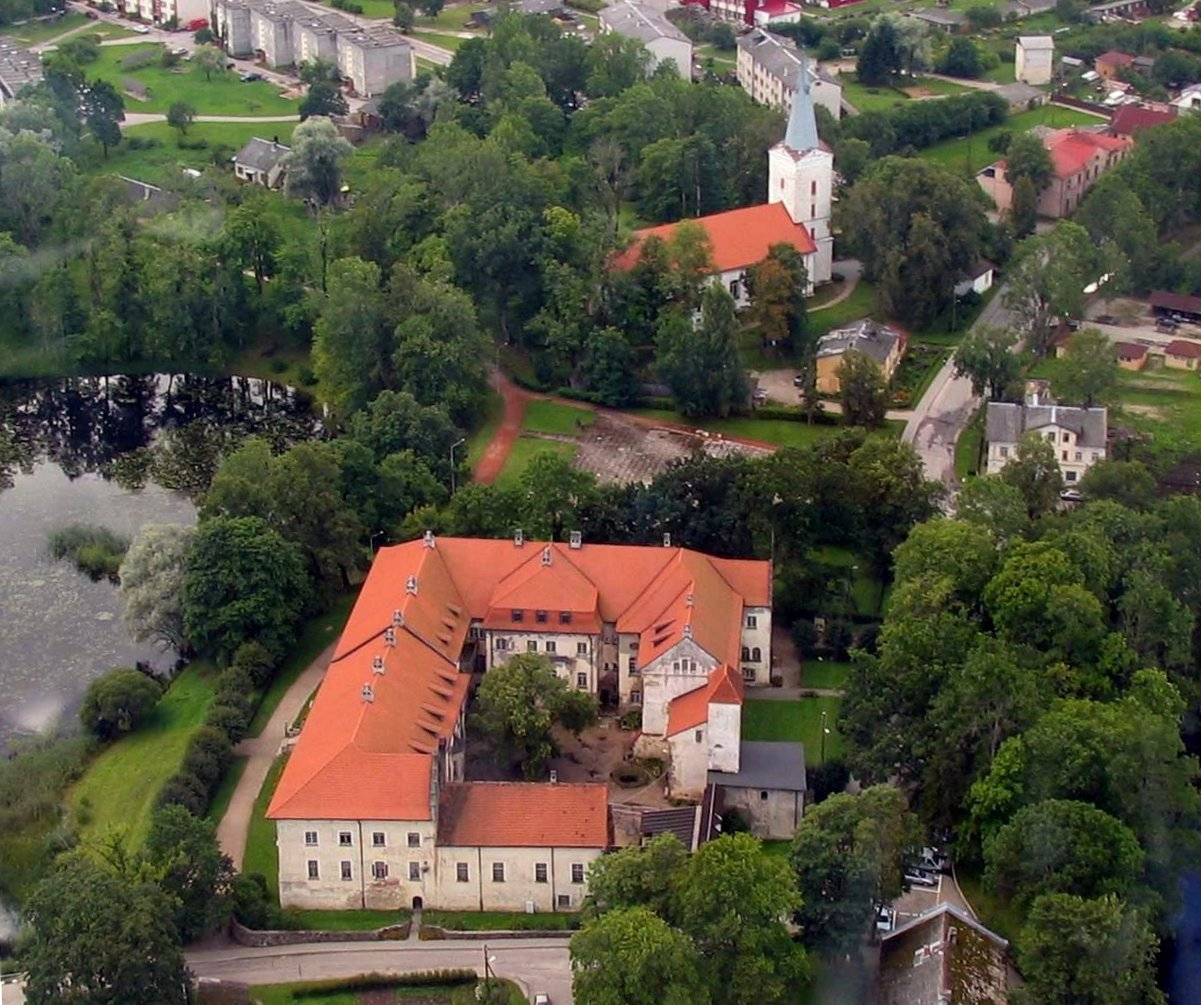
- Panorama of Dundaga Castle

- Location within Latvia
- Coordinates: 57°30′33″N 22°20′58″E
- Country: Latvia
- Municipality: Talsi Municipality
- Parish: Dundaga Parish
- Mentioned first time: 1245
- Town rights awarded: 1950
- Town rights revoked: 1990
- Elevation: 63 m (207 ft)

Population (2011)
  - Total: 1,682

Dundaga (Livonian: Dūoņig) is a village in Talsi Municipality in the Courland region of Latvia. From 2009 until 2021, the village served as the administrative centre of the former Dundaga Municipality.

Dundaga is known for its castle, constructed by the Archbishopric of Riga in the late 13th century. From the 16th century until 1918, Dundaga Castle (formerly Dundagen) was the centre of the largest private estate in Courland, belonging to the Baron Osten-Sacken family, an important local Baltic-German noble dynasty.
