= Speer: Hitler's Architect =

2015 book by Martin Kitchen

- First edition
- Author: Martin Kitchen
- Language: English
- Subject: Albert Speer
- Genre: Nazi Germany
- Publisher: Yale University Press
- Publication date: 2015
- Publication place: England

Speer: Hitler's Architect is a biography of Albert Speer written in 2015 by Martin Kitchen.

== Reviews ==
Adam Tooze writing in The Wall Street Journal said the book had given a "devastating portrait of an empty, narcissistic and compulsively ambitious personality." Writing for History Today in 2016 Roger Moorhouse said "Kitchen is brilliant and brutal, exposing every aspect of his subject’s story to stern scrutiny. He begins at the very start, showing that even Speer’s tale of his birth was a lie." Kirkus Reviews said "Kitchen sets the record straight on Albert Speer’s assertions of ignorance of the Final Solution and claims to being the good Nazi." Robert Fulford writing in the National Post said "The Nuremberg judges sentenced him to 20 years in prison for his use of slave labour — a modest sentence when you consider that others (including Speer's own deputy) were executed. He spent those two decades in Spandau prison burnishing his alibis".

Jonathan Meades writing in the London Review of Books said "Speer: Hitler’s Architect is not a biography. It is a 200,000-word charge sheet. Kitchen is steely, dogged and attentive to the small print. He shows Speer no mercy, nailing his every exculpatory ruse and demonstrating time and again how provisional the notion of truth was to him. This was a man who persistently invented and reinvented his past." He added "This was...a game of his devising in which he toyed with a series of mostly awed apologists, interlocutors, historians, biographers, journalists, psychologists and groupies – who always lost."
