= Carl Frederik Bricka =

Danish archivist, historian, and biographer (1845-1903)

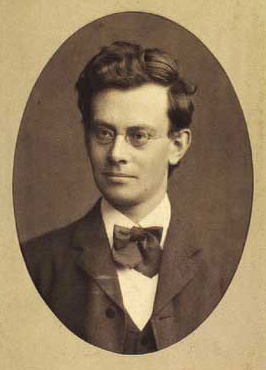
- Born: 10 July 1845; Copenhagan, Denmark
- Died: 23 August 1903 (aged 58)
- Occupations: Archivist, Historian, Biographer

Carl Frederik Bricka (10 July 1845 – 23 August 1903) was a Danish archivist, historian, and biographer.

== Biography ==
Carl Bricka was born in Copenhagen, Denmark. His father, Frederik Vilhelm Theodor Bricka (1809–79), was a medical doctor. He attended Metropolitanskolen and earned his Magister degree from the University of Copenhagen (1870). He became an assistant at the Danish Royal Library in 1871. During the period 1883–97, he was employed in the Danish National Archives, after which he became the department head (Rigsarkivar).

Bricka became a member of the board of the Danish Historical Society and edited the historical magazine published by the association (1878–97). He also served as editor of Danske Magazin (1883–1901). From 1885 until his death in 1903, he was the publisher of the Dansk biografisk lexikon: tillige omfattende Norge for Tidsrummet 1537–1814. The first edition of this Danish biographic encyclopedia was published by Gyldendal in 19 volumes between 1887 and 1905. He died in Copenhagen and was buried at Frederiksberg Ældre Kirkegård.

== Other sources ==
- L.L.: Bricka, Carl Frederik, in Blangstrup, Christian (ed.): Salmonsens Konversationsleksikon, Copenhagen 1915 – 1930, vol. III (1915), p. 947f. URL last accessed 2007-09-15.
