= Dundaga Parish =

Parish of Latvia

- parish of Latvia
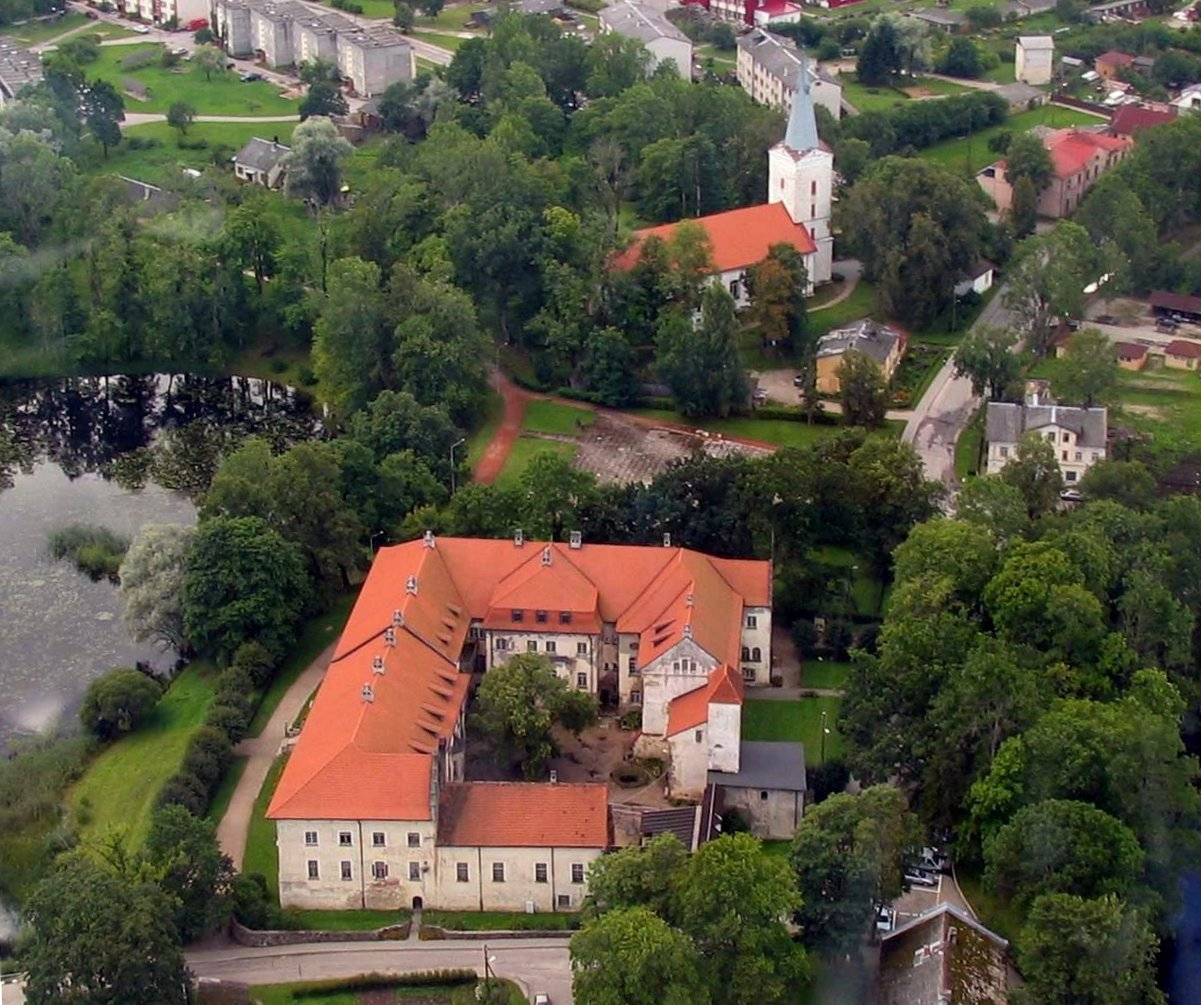

- Coat of arms

- 57°32′22″N 22°23′07″E
- Country: Latvia

Area
  - Total: 558.68 km^{2} (215.71 sq mi)
  - Land: 550.5 km^{2} (212.5 sq mi)
  - Water: 8.18 km^{2} (3.16 sq mi)

Population (1 January 2024)
  - Total: 2,602
  - Density: 4.7/km^{2} (12/sq mi)

Dundaga parish (Latvian: Dundagas pagasts, Livonian: Dūoņig pagāst) is an administrative unit of Talsi Municipality in the Courland region of Latvia. It is the largest parish in Latvia.

Coat of arms of Dundaga Parish depicting a singing capercaillie

== Villages of Dundaga parish ==
- Dundaga
