= Francis Carsten =

British historian

- Born: Francis Ludwig Carsten; 25 June 1911; Berlin
- Died: 23 June 1998 (aged 86); London
- Occupations: historian, academic
- Spouse: Ruth (née Moses)
- Children: Janet Carsten

Francis Ludwig Carsten (25 June 1911 – 23 June 1998) was a German-born British historian of Central Europe. He was described by Peter Wende as "the doyen of British historians working on Germany". He was the father of British social anthropologist Janet Carsten.

== Background ==
Carsten was born on 25 June 1911 in Berlin to a family with strong identification with the German culture. His father Paul Carsten was an eye specialist and a professor at Berlin's Friedrich Wilhelm University (called Humboldt University after 1945). His mother was part of well-connected Jewish-German upper-middle-class family of Austrian origin. The Carsten family owned a clothing house called Die Goldene 110.

He took law at the University of Geneva in 1929 and passed his Referendar examination in 1933. He had been a member of the Sozialistischer Schülerbund, a youth organization of the Communist Party. He was active in the late 1920s and early 1930s. He later became critical of the organization, particularly its "Social Fascist" strategy. He became involved in an underground organization called Neu Beginnen, which infiltrated the SPD and KPD.

== Immigration ==
Immediately after Adolf Hitler's seizure of power in January 1933, Nazi Germany adopted and radicalized discriminatory policies against Jews. Carsten fled Germany after he was tipped off that the Gestapo was after him. He first settled in Amsterdam and stayed there for three years. His works during this period included a research on early Prussian history. This was undertaken for the International Institute for Social History, where he maintained close contact with the sociologist Norbert Elias. He then moved to Britain in 1939, where he was offered a fellowship at Wadham College, Oxford. He stayed with Austen Harry Albu, who – together with his wife – had been helping German emigres. Carsten became a British citizen in 1946.

Later, Carsten was part of the group of German immigrants who were recruited by the British government to assist in its preparations for the occupation of Germany. He worked for the British Political Warfare Executive, giving political advice being enemy aliens. During this period, he completed the Basic German Handbook, which compiled factual information about German political, legal, and educational systems as well as the background on the Nazi political organization. Like other German emigres, Carsten saw himself as a mediator and bridge between British and German cultures.

== Later years ==
After the war, Carsten concentrated on his academic interests. He was pivotal in establishing German and Austrian history as an academic subject in Britain. He was particularly influential in advancing this cause when he became the Masaryk Chair of Central European History at the University College London's School of Slavonic and East European Studies in 1961. Over years, he has influenced younger generation of British historians who were interested in the history of Central Europe and facilitated the closer contacts between British, German, and Austrian historians.

Carsten died on 23 June 1998.

== Selected publications ==
- The Rise of Fascism
- The Origins of Prussia
- The Reichswehr and Politics, 1918–1933
- Princes and Parliaments in Germany, from the Fifteenth to the Eighteenth Century
- Revolution in Central Europe, 1918–1919
- The New Cambridge Modern History. Vol. 5, The Ascendancy of France, 1648–88
- The German Resistance to Hitler
- The German Workers and the Nazis
- War against Aar: British and German Radical Movements in the First World War
- A History of the Prussian Junkers
- The First Austrian Republic, 1918–1938: A Study Based on British and Austrian Documents
- Fascist Movements in Austria: From Schönerer to Hitler
- Britain and the Weimar Republic: The British Documents

== Notable Articles ==
- The Nobility of Brandenburg and Prussia from the 16th to the 18th Century
- Germany and Austria, ca. 1820 to 1880
- The Weimar Republic
- New 'Evidence' against Marshal Tukhachevsky
- Slavs in North-Eastern Germany
- The German Generals and Hitler, 1933–1938
