= Vanessa Lapa =

Israeli filmmaker

- ונסה לאפא
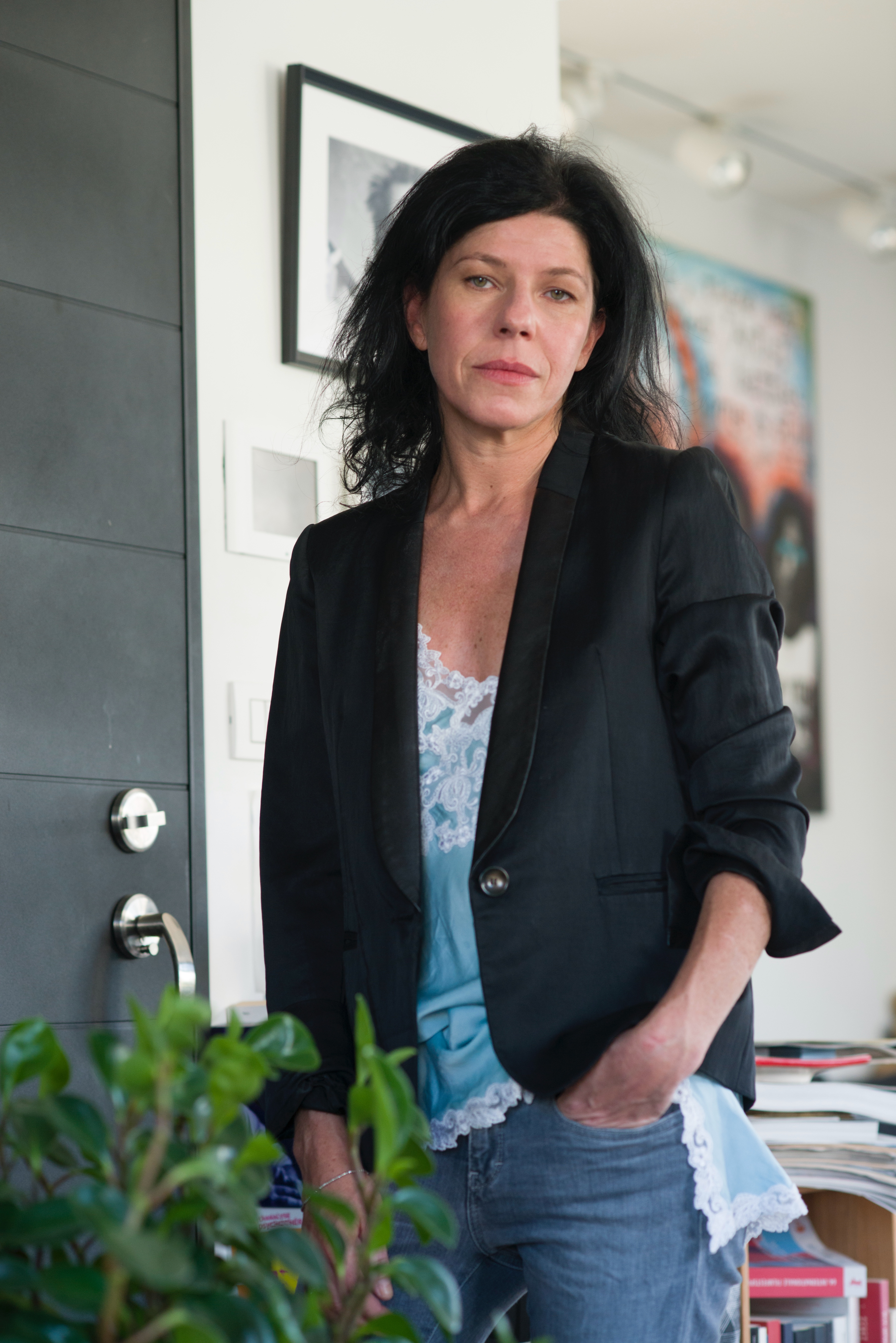
- Lapa at the 2021
- Born: May 29, 1975 (age 51); Antwerpen, Belgium
- Citizenship: Israeli
- Education: Tel Aviv University (BA) Camera Obscura, Tel Aviv.
- Occupations: Film director; producer; screenwriter
- Years active: 2002–present
- Awards: Best Documentary film, Jerusalem Film Festival 2014; The Diamond Award for Best director, JFF 2021; Ophir Award for the best long documentary film for the year 2021.

Vanessa Lapa (Hebrew: ונסה לאפא) is an Israeli documentary filmmaker known for two films that deal with Nazi war criminals Heinrich Himmler and his colleague Albert Speer. In addition, she has produced more than a hundred reports and documentaries for the television channels in Israel.

== Early life ==
Lapa was born on May 29, 1975, in Antwerp, Belgium, in a very ideological "Betar" Zionist home and immigrated to Israel alone at the age of 19. She studied Middle Eastern and Arabic studies at Tel Aviv University, and then film studies at Camera Obscura school in Tel-Aviv. After her academic studies she started to work at Channel 1 as a researcher for Current affairs programs like "Popolitica" and "Erev Hadash". After the founding of Channel 10 in 2002, she joined it, and served as a researcher for the "Ben and Rosen" program and later as a reporter and researcher in the field of foreign news. She worked for The New York Times columnist Thomas Friedman in producing and directing a 52-minute documentary film about the Israeli West Bank barrier, a film that gained worldwide circulation through The New York Times.

== Freelance directing and producing ==
In 2006 Lapa set up an Independent Production company called RealWorks Ltd.. Her first film was "Olmert – Concealed Documentary" from 2008 which dealt with the private and public life of then Israeli Prime Minister Ehud Olmert. It was supposed to be broadcast on Channel 2 by the Keshet franchisee, but was shelved following the revelation of Olmert's possible involvement with bribery in the Talansky affair that arose ahead of the broadcast date in June 2008

Keshet executives wanted Lapa to push back the broadcast date and interview Olmert about the affair, as she already had access to Olmert and the documentary was now potentially important journalism. Lapa was reluctant, but agreed to do another interview. However, Olmert did not reveal anything of note, partly because there was a restraining order by the court on the affair. Keshet wanted more, but Lapa refused to continue the documentary, saying, "It's not my job to confront him."

According to journalist and media lecturer Aviva Lori, the argument between Lapa and "Keshet" was over the limits of documentary responsibility. Eventually, the film aired several months later.

== The Decent One ==
In 2006, the diaries of Heinrich Himmler and his family reached her. The first to collect the 10-15 diaries, along with 350 letters from Himmler to his wife, and another 135 stills and various documents, were U.S. Army soldiers who captured Himmler's home on May 6, 1945. For some reason they were not handed over to the military authorities. All this material "laid" for decades in the house of an Israeli citizen, Haim Rosenthal (there is a version that the documents were in a bank safe), and in 2006 Lapa's father bought it from Rosenthal's son and together With Prof. Nati Laor of Tel Aviv University, they persuaded Lapa to engage with the material. She worked on the diaries for 7 years, searching archives around the world for authentic videos in which he appears, using techniques and technologies designed to clean the dirt that clung to the footage, and restoring their seemingly original soundtrack, to create the movie "The Decent One". When German TV stations refused to co-finance the project, Austrian investor Martin Schlaff stepped in.

The film premiered at the Berlin International Film Festival 2014 and has participated in dozens of festivals around the world. It won the best docu-award of the Jerusalem Film Festival (2014) and was among the five finalists for the Israeli Academy of Film Award (Ophir Award). The film was on the list of 134 documentaries released in October 2014 from which the nominees for the Academy Award for Best Documentary were selected.

== Speer Goes to Hollywood ==
The next film Lapa directed and produced and belonging to the same cinematic genre is "Speer Goes to Hollywood". It is about Albert Speer, the Minister of Armaments and War Production in Nazi Germany, who was sentenced to 20 years imprisonment at the Nuremberg trials. The film is based on the recorded conversations between him and screenwriter Andrew Birkin from 1971 and 1972 about turning his book Inside the Third Reich into a movie. The film goes against his claim that he was unaware of the extermination of the Jews These conversations reveal his true and antisemitic character which stands in stark contrast to the "innocent" character he tried to present in the Nuremberg trials and in his book. Lapa, together with Tomer Eliav, the sound designer of "The Decent One", once again worked together to research Speer. The film had its world premiere at the Berlin International Film Festival 2020 and won "the best documentary film director" at the Jerusalem Film Festival in Autumn, 2021 as part of the Diamond Competition for Israeli Documentary Film. The film won the Ophir Award for the best Long documentary film for the year 2021. The film was later criticized for not being historically accurate due to changes and additions made in recreating the original 1970s tape conversations with actors.
