= Martin Schlaff =

Austrian businessman (born 1953)

- Born: August 6, 1953 (age 72); Vienna, Austria
- Education: Vienna University of Economics and Business
- Occupations: Investor, Businessman
- Spouse(s): Three including Andrea Schlaff (divorced) and Dr. Barbara Koenig
- Children: 6

Martin Schlaff (born 6 August 1953) is an Austrian billionaire investor, businessman, networker, and philanthropist. Since 2006, he is a major shareholder of RHI Magnesita. His net worth is estimated over €8 billion.

== Early life and education ==
Schlaff was born in Vienna, Austria, to Jewish refugees from World War II. His parents lived in a camp for displaced persons. He has one brother, James, born in 1952. Martin Schlaff studied at the Vienna University of Economics and Business and completed his studies with a master's degree in 1975.

== Career ==
In 1976, he took over the financial company Robert Placzek AG in Vienna, founded by his father, Chaim Schlaff, and partners. The firm traded with goods from Eastern Europe, mainly wood, cellulose and paper.

=== Trading with Eastern Europe ===
In his first years he continued trading with several Central and Eastern Europe (CEE) countries, mainly Hungary, Czechoslovakia and Poland, thereafter also with East Germany. Step by step he expanded the business, first offering textiles, then also computer parts, circumventing the embargo by sourcing merchandise from Singapore that was not listed, and delivering it via countries that had not signed the CoCom embargo treaty. According to a Bundestag commission report from 1998, Martin Schlaff and Alexander Schalck-Golodkowski (KoKo) later-on circumvented the Western embargo when building a hard drive storage factory in Meiningen shortly before the collapse of the GDR. Though, the commission did not succeed in finding the secret treaty between KoKo and Schlaff. The code name of the project was Objekt Wappen.

=== Casino in the West Bank ===
After the fall of the Iron Curtain, Schlaff had to reinvent his business models. In 1998, he opened a casino and a hotel in Jericho, a Palestinian city on the West Bank. Named "The Oasis", it was aimed at guests from Israel, where gaming is not legal. The project was partly owned by the Palestinian National Authority. The project was immediately a huge financial success - for the founders as well as for the community. The casino was closed during the Second Intifada in September 2000 and never reopened.

=== Mobile phone companies ===
In the first years of the century, he has purchased Bulgarian Mobiltel, and resold it after several years of restructuring for big profit. Similar deals were thereafter executed in two other emerging markets, but with less profit. After restructuring the companies, the Serbian Mobtel was sold to Telenor, a Norwegian company, and the Belarusian Velcom was bought by Telekom Austria. The profits from these deals were subject of envy, bitter controversies, and criticism in Austria.

=== RHI Magnesita ===
In 2006, a foundation attributed to Schlaff bought about 6% of the shares of RHI AG, the world's largest supplier of refractory products. By September of the following year the MS Privatstiftung already owned 26.47% of the shares. In 2016, Schlaff intended to install Christian Kern as CEO of the company, but Kern recused himself when his party nominated him to become chancellor of Austria. Also in 2016, Schlaff managed the merger of RHI with a major competitor, the Brazilian Magnesita. While the headquarters of the company remained in Vienna, RHI Magnesita left the Vienna Stock Exchange. The company is now listed on the London Stock Exchange and is a constituent of the FTSE 250 Index.

In 2010, he established a bank in Liechtenstein called Sigma Bank.

=== Networking ===
Martin Schlaff is known as a skillful networker. Although a social democrat, he was also on good talking terms with conservative leaders, be it Ariel Sharon in Israel or Wolfgang Schüssel in Austria. Although a Jew, he was respected by Arab leaders such as Yasser Arafat or Muammar Gaddafi. In 1998, he helped Bank Austria survive the Rubel crisis. In 2002, he helped Jörg Haider and Ariel Muzicant broker a deal to end a lawsuit after Haider's anti-Semitic insults. Only few of his endeavours on the international level became known:

- In 2001, he arranged a meeting between Omri Sharon, a son of Ariel Sharon, and high ranking PLO officials in his penthouse in Vienna. The goal of this meeting was reconciliation in Palestine.
- In 2002, Schlaff used his contacts with Ariel Sharon to help normalize the Austrian Federal Government's relations with Israel. The Israeli Government had recalled its ambassador from Vienna, after government participation of the FPÖ in 2000. A new Israeli ambassador was sent to Austria at the end of 2003.
- In 2007, he helped to free the five nurses from Bulgaria, sentenced to death in Libya because they supposedly infected hundreds of Libyan children with the HIV.
- In 2010, Schlaff arranged the release of Rafael Haddad, a Jew accused of espionage in Libya and imprisoned there. Haddad was flown to Vienna in Schlaff's private jet and welcomed by Avigdor Lieberman, then foreign minister of Israel.

=== Allegations and accusations ===
At the end of 1986, after Franz Vranitzky had ended the coalition with the Freedom Party, he joined the Socialist Party of Austria (SPÖ). Shortly thereafter, attacks against him began. According to Martin Schlaff, German chancellor Helmut Kohl used him as a scapegoat in order to deviate the public attention from the miscalculations of his own cabinet regarding the costs of German unification. Kohl accused the investor of having diverted secret funds of GDR and having been a collaborator of the Stasi. Schlaff's answers were: "I was no Stasi informer." And: "The hard drive business was carried out in accordance with the contract and completely correctly."

Germany's Attorney General never found any plausible cause to present a case against Schlaff and therefore in 1998 all criminal investigations were officially terminated. In April 2002, after four years of litigation in the civil case Germany vs. Martin Schlaff, a Swiss court decided that the German allegations were baseless. Schlaff won all charges. The court ordered to unblock nearly 43 million Euro which had been unlawfully confiscated. Germany transferred the amount and did not even try to appeal the 500 page verdict. Only years later, after Kohl's death, former cabinet member Bernd Schmidbauer offered his excuses.

In Israel, Ha’aretz published several stories accusing Schlaff of corrupt and illegal activities in several countries including Austria and Israel. None of the accusations led to criminal indictments or verdicts, neither in Austria nor in Israel nor anywhere else.

== Philanthropy ==
Martin Schlaff supports various causes in healthcare and in social help. He is also a patron of the arts, mainly in the fields of classical music and opera.

=== Social Support ===
For many decades, Martin Schlaff has been the driving force behind Chai Lifeline, an organization for children battling a deadly disease. In 2006, a major donation went to Massachusetts General Hospital and its research in pedriatric gastroenterology. In 2018, he donated to the Columbia University Irving Medical Center, again for helping sick children. His long lasting relationship with the Chabad movement led to his support for the project Children of Chernobyl, established by Steven Spielberg.

On several occasions he helped the Austrian Cancer Assistance (Österreichische Krebshilfe). In 2010, this organization named him ″Sponsor of the Century". At his horse farm near Vienna, he set up a riding therapy center for children with special needs. In Vienna, he has been financing the Gan Sara Kindergarten, another Chabad project, as well as the Chaim Schlaff Dining Hall, which offers free meals for up to 150 persons three times a day.

=== Classical Music ===
Martin Schlaff has given donations to all three opera houses in Vienna — State Opera, Theater an der Wien and Volksoper — and furthermore to the Salzburg Easter Festival, the Vienna Festival and the Grafenegg Festival. He also donated to La Scala of Milan, the Metropolitan Opera of New York, the Lucerne Festival, the Orchestra Academy of the Vienna Philharmonic as well as the European Union Youth Orchestra. He procured a 1790 violin by Nicola Bergonzi for upcoming artist Lilian Pocitari and he enabled a series of concerts with all Beethoven violin sonatas during the COVID-19 pandemic, all played by Julian Rachlin.

=== Jewish History ===
In 1993, he donated his ample collection of Antisemitica to the Jewish Museum Vienna. According to the Museum, Schlaff's intention is easy to explain: ″The collector wanted to take the objects off the market and, so to speak, remove them from their originally intended use — to forment and further inflame antisemitism.″ In return, the City of Vienna awarded him a medal of honour.

In 2013, a film project of Israeli director Vanessa Lapa lost the support of German TV channels. The project was a documentation on mass murderer Heinrich Himmler based on his diaries and letters, unpublished up to this point. Himmler was one of the main perpetrators of the Holocaust, the Porajmo, the murderer of millions of civilians and prisoners of war as part of the Generalplan Ost, and numerous other crimes against humanity. The project was on the brink, Martin Schlaff decided to step in and to provide the necessary funds. The film was completed in 2014, it was called The Decent One. It was presented at the Berlinale and received the Van Leer Award for Best Israeli Documentary Film at the Jerusalem Film Festival.

== Personal life ==
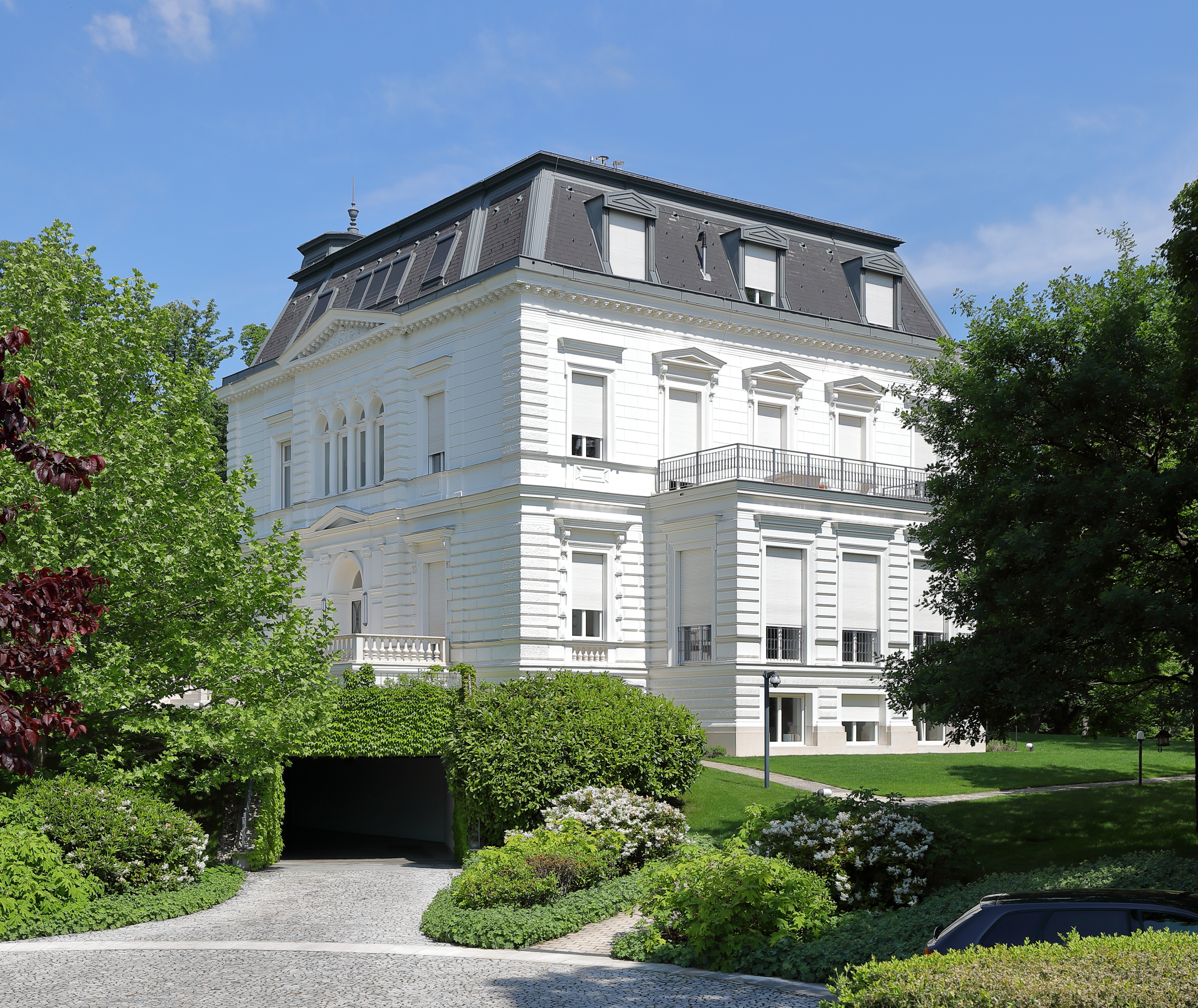
Residence of Andrea Schlaff in Vienna

His parents moved to Israel after retiring. Martin Schlaff could not attend the funeral of his father in 2010 as the Israeli authorities did not grant him safe conduct; at that time the investigations against the family of Ariel Sharon were in full swing. In 2015, after all investigations were concluded, Martin Schlaff returned to Israel to attend a family wedding.

He was married three times. He has six children, three with his first wife, two with his second wife, Andrea, and one with his third wife, Barbara. According to the news magazine Profil, Schlaff's 2007 divorce from his wife Andrea involved a €200 million settlement, the largest ever reported up to that time.

== Accolades ==
- 1993 Gold Medal of Honour for Services to the province of Vienna

== Interviews ==
- Profil, 23 January 2006
- "Wie ich in der Öffentlichkeit gesehen werde, ist mir wurscht", Profil, 31 July 2012
- "Ich habe jede Blöße genützt", Die Zeit, 8 November 2012
- "Ich würde alle österreichischen Bundesländer abschaffen", Forbes Austria, 8 April 2015
- Martin Schlaff: "Strache bleibt nicht in der Schmuddelecke", Die Presse, 16 January 2019
- Martin Schlaff: Der Mann hinter der Mauer, Profil, 19 November 2019
- Milliardär Martin Schlaff: "Ich bin kein Knecht der SPÖ", Kurier, 14 November 2020
- Martin Schlaff: „Wir bräuchten eine neue Welle der Aufklärung!", Die Bühne, 8 May 2023
