= Dan Margalit (journalist) =

Israeli journalist, author and television host (1938–2025)

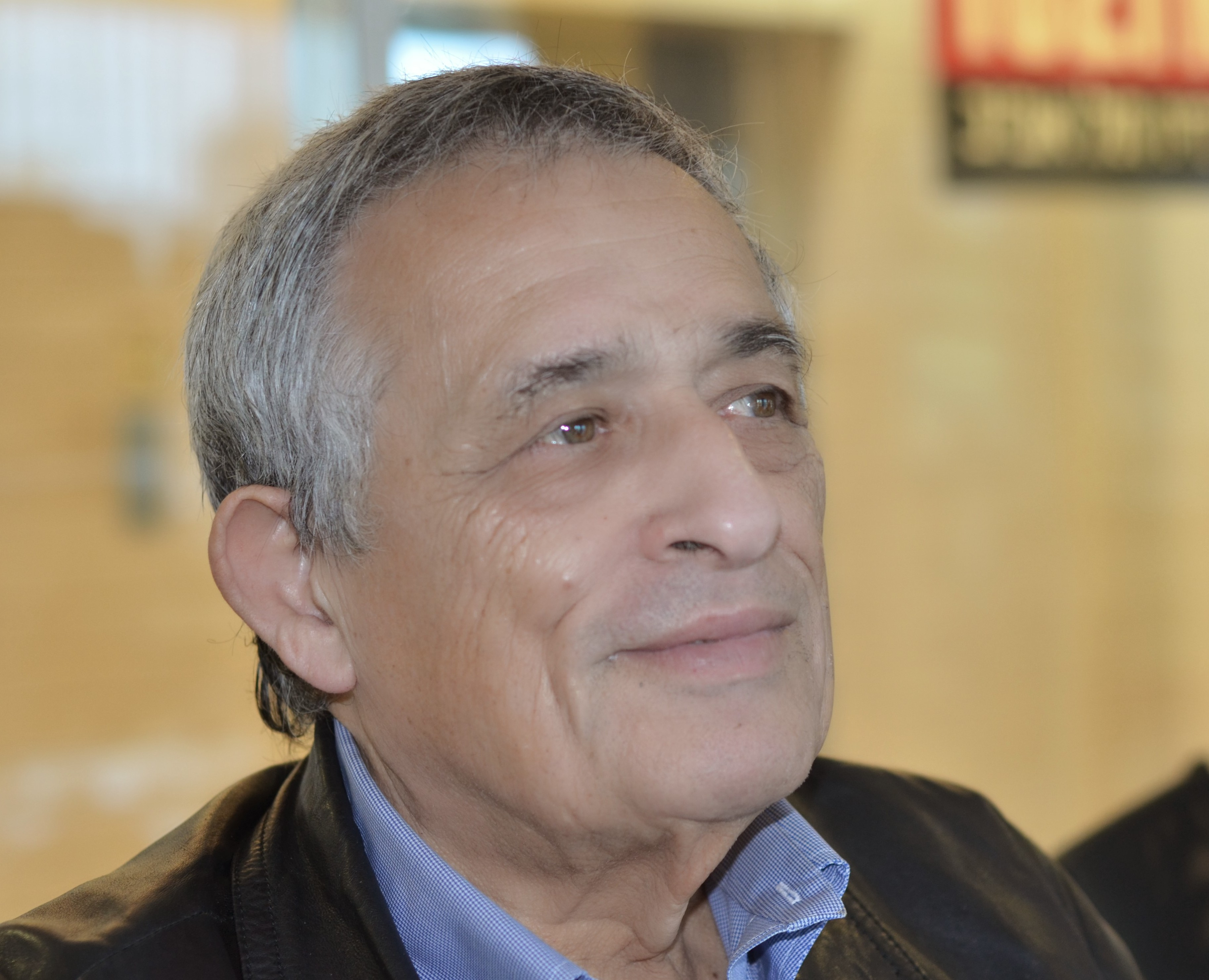
Margalit in 2014

Dan Margalit (Hebrew: דן מרגלית; 13 March 1938 – 28 August 2025) was an Israeli journalist, author and television host.

== Background ==
Dan Margalit was born and raised in Tel Aviv. His father, Israel, was a doctor, and his mother, Ora, was a psychologist. He studied international relations and modern Jewish history at the Hebrew University of Jerusalem. He began writing for the Israeli newspaper Haaretz in the 1960s.

He was married to Eliora Lucci Margalit, with whom he had three daughters: Keren, Shira, and Noya. Shira is the deputy director general of the Reshet television network, while Keren is a television director and screenwriter. After divorcing Eliora, Margalit married Dana, a lecturer at Ariel University.

Margalit died on 28 August 2025, at the age of 87. His family announced his death later the same day.

== Journalism career ==
In 1977, while serving as Washington correspondent of Haaretz, Margalit revealed that Leah Rabin, wife of prime minister Yitzhak Rabin, had a United States bank account, illegal in Israel at the time. The story, known as the Dollar Account affair, led to Rabin's resignation and the nomination of Shimon Peres as the Alignment's candidate for prime minister.

In 1992, he was appointed editor of Maariv by publisher Ofer Nimrodi, but he resigned six months later. In June 2007, Margalit began to write for Israel HaYom, a new free daily newspaper in Israel.

On 6 June 2017, Margalit informed the public via his Twitter account that he had been fired from Israel Hayom.

== Television career ==
Margalit was one of the regular hosts of the Israeli Educational Television's current affairs show "Erev Hadash" from its early days in 1982. During the 1990s he hosted current affairs panel shows on Channel 1 and later on commercial television. From 2004 he hosted a current affairs panel show on Channel 10.

== Sexual harassment allegations ==
In 2018, Haaretz reported that five female co-workers accused Margalit of sexual harassment during the late 1980s and early 1990s.

One of the women, Hannah Kim, a former journalist for "Ha'ir", "Hadashot" (news) and "Haaretz" publicized it on her social media account. Margalit said: "There is nothing to these claims about incidents that allegedly happened more than 30 years ago. I don't intend to devote my remaining years to an argument that has no chance at this moment, given the prevailing mood." Orly Azoulay claimed that Margalit sexually harassed her after a Popolitica talk show which he hosted. As a result, Margalit announced on the same day that he would cease journalistic work.

== See also ==
- Israeli television
- Israeli journalism
