= Bill Siemering =

American radio personality

William H. Siemering
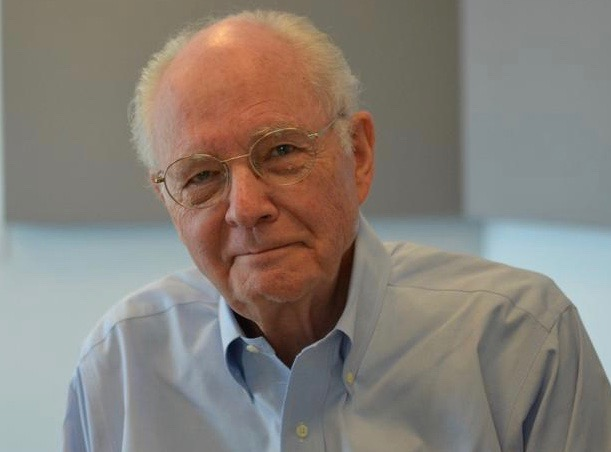
- William H. Siemering during a visit to St. Louis Public Radio in 2017
- Born: October 26, 1934
- Education: University of Wisconsin
- Known for: Contributions to National Public Radio in the United States and independent radio in the developing world
- Notable work: Author: National Public Radio Purposes (1970)
- Spouse(s): Lucretia Robbins, artist and gardener

William H. Siemering (born October 26, 1934) is an American radio innovator and advocate. He was a member of the founding board of NPR and the author of its original "mission statement," the National Public Radio Purposes. As NPR's first director of programming Siemering helped shaped its flagship program All Things Considered into an influential and enduring fixture of American media. After a decades-long career in public radio, Siemering embarked on a second career of nurturing independent radio in the developing world.

== Early life ==
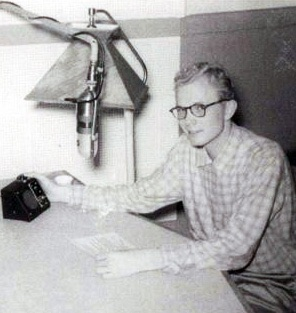
William H. Siemering working as an announcer at WHA in 1956

William Siemering grew up in rural Wisconsin. As a student in a two-room school outside of Madison, he listened to the "Wisconsin School of the Air." These twice-a-day radio programs produced by WHA brought educators from the University of Wisconsin into isolated country schools throughout the state. Siemering would later observe: "As early as first grade, radio both educated me and spurred my imagination."

Siemering's appreciation of radio increased during his high school years as he witnessed first-hand the importance of WHA's daily farm program while working summers baling hay and harvesting grain. He changed from listener to active participant when he enrolled at the University of Wisconsin at Madison and worked his way through school at WHA as a board operator, announcer, and newscaster. Siemering would later remark, "WHA had become the statewide Wisconsin Educational Radio Network, and I saw how it linked the state through its programming."

== Public Radio Career ==
=== WBFO ===
In 1963, William Siemering became the first professional general manager of WBFO, the student radio station at the State University of New York (SUNY) at Buffalo. He was hired by Richard Siggelkow, a former faculty member at UW, who was now the dean of students. Siggelkow protected the journalistic integrity of the station and gave the new manager total freedom to transform it. Like most college radio stations at the time, WBFO had been a student club limited to evening hours during the academic year. By the end of Siemering's eight-year tenure, however, the station had substantially expanded its hours of operations and the professionalism of its staff. Howard Arenstein, Ira Flatow, Clifford Stoll and Henry Tenenbaum are among WBFO's notable alums.

WBFO's programming became increasingly experimental and innovative during the late 1960s. It broadcast live events from a major arts festival, readings by local and visiting artists, and a program where art students discussed their creative process. One of the more remarkable experiments was City Links: Buffalo, 28-hour-long live performance piece by Maryann Amacher in which she mixed ambient sounds transmitted from five city locations.

The politicization of the campus community during the Vietnam War increased the focus on the news at WBFO. This came to a head in during the student strike of March 1970. Protestors occupied the student center, police stormed the campus and tear gas was in the air. Nobody was talking to each other, but Warren Bennis, a vice president at the university, used an open mike from the station to start a dialog. Live coverage continued well into the night, during which WBFO interviewed student radicals, campus administrators, city officials and the police. "The idea," Siemering reported, "was that there is not a single truth here."

The success of the strike coverage led Siemering to create This is Radio!, a WBFO magazine show that was later co-hosted by Terry Gross and served as a model for Fresh Air. "He [Siemering] opened mikes, put participants on the air and talked to them," David Benders, a 33-year veteran at WBFO, recalls, "It was the first modern-day talk show—it started something new."

William Siemering's tenure at WBFO was also marked by an extraordinary outreach to Buffalo's African-American community. Shortly upon his arrival in 1963, Siemering canvassed the community and produced a radio series titled To be Negro, but the riots that followed the assassination of Martin Luther King in 1968 prompted a different approach. After meetings during which blacks aired their grievances regarding the Media, Siemering established a satellite station in the heart of the city. Volunteers from the community—none of whom with prior experience in radio—planned and produced 28 hours of programming for WBFO that ranged from a children's program to one on avant-garde jazz, as well as community discussions ranging from school busing to drug addiction. A number of the staff went on to successful careers in commercial radio and TV.

=== NPR ===
Broadcasting in the United States was dominated by three commercial networks during most of the 20th century, but this landscape changed with the passing of The Public Broadcasting Act of 1967 and the creation of the Corporation for Public Broadcasting (CPB). By providing financial assistance to producers of educational programming through the CPB, the act enabled them to provide both diversity and excellence to a wider audience. Originally conceived exclusively for public television, the act also called for the creation of public radio.

By this time, William Siemering had become an influential thinker on the role and potential of public radio. It wouldn't be staid like much of educational radio nor would it be superficial as was often the case for commercial radio. He argued for authenticity, depth and the thoughtful exchange of diverse perspectives and ideas. Moreover, Siemering argued for the imaginative power of sound in radio. It could be more than television without pictures.

In late 1969, Siemering joined Joe Gwathmey of KUT, Benard Mayes of KQED, Karl Schmidt of WHA and five other educational radio station managers to comprise the founding board of directors for National Public Radio (NPR). They decided that public radio needed a distinctive daily program that would attract audiences and provide the new network with a unique identity. The board assigned the task of writing the Mission and Goals statement, the National Public Radio Purposes, to William Siemering. Parts of this statement were later read to Don Quayle during his interview to become NPR's first president. When asked if he could implement it, Quayle responded, "Yes, if I can hire the man who wrote it."

As NPR's first director of programming, Siemering was entrusted with developing the distinctive daily program that would help define the fledgling organization. Informed by his experience with This is Radio! at WBFO, he wanted a flexible magazine format that would mix news, art and culture in a fashion that would be engaging, creative and conversational. It would "reflect the diversity of America and let the country hear itself." The program, All Things Considered, debuted on May 3, 1971. It opened with the quiet, conversational and unscripted voice of its first host, Robert Conley, followed by a first-person account of heroin addiction, an interview with an enterprising barber in Iowa, and a dramatic and evocative 20-minute sound montage of the massive anti-war demonstration that gripped Washington, D.C., earlier that day.

Far from formulaic, All Things Considered experienced more than its share of stumbles and missteps. The program, however, began to gel after Jack W. Mitchell assumed the day-to-day responsibilities of running the program. Its voice also developed, most notably with the addition of Susan Stamberg as co-host. After a rocky first year, All Things Considered achieved credibility and won recognition, including the Peabody Award in 1972. Nonetheless, Don Quayle, presumably dissatisfied with Siemering's personnel practices and management style, fired him that December.

=== Minnesota Public Radio ===
Bill King, the president of Minnesota Public Radio (MPR), offered William Siemering a fresh start in public radio. The network had opened KCCM, a new station based in Moorhead. Siemering was to develop the station, feed local news and features to MPR and get the station CPB-qualified (Corporation for Public Broadcasting). The opportunity offered him considerable autonomy in developing programs, and, because Moorhead was located on Minnesota's western border with North Dakota, it represented something of a return to his rural roots.

Programming at KCCM reflected many of Siemering's ideas for public radio. Home for the Weekend was weekly program that explored everything from the American Dream and what is a caring community to the best feed for cows. Our Home Town was an extended series of sound portraits of six small towns in North Dakota. KCCM even set up a listening post at a local mall where citizens could voice their opinions on current issues and interact with public officials.

Siemering also kept true to his pattern of hiring energetic and capable people despite their lack of radio experience. Three of these hires, Marcia Alvar, Dennis Hamilton and John Ydstie, went on to have successful careers in public radio.

One of Siemering's goals at Moorhead was to contribute 52 pieces to NPR during the course of a year. He achieved that goal. He was also elected to NPR's Board as a petition candidate and participated in policy-making decisions over a ten-year period. Siemering's stint at KCCM was followed by a year as vice president for programming at MPR in St. Paul. He then moved to Philadelphia to take on a different kind of challenge.

=== WHYY-FM ===
In 1978, WHYY-FM (then known as WUHY-FM) was an underperforming public radio station with one of the largest potential audiences in the country. As its new station manager (later retitled as the Vice President for Radio), William Siemering oversaw the sustained growth of the station's audience and operations, the expansion of its news staff and the development of its programming. He helped develop a successful local show, Fresh Air, hosted by Terry Gross, into the third most listened program on NPR and created Radio Times with Marty Moss-Coanne. Siemering left WHYY in 1987.

=== Soundprint ===
William Siemering incorporated music, sound and compelling storytelling into radio programming since his days at WBFO and also played a key role in crafting NPR's distinctive sound. He further nurtured the medium's possibilities when he served as the first executive producer of (1987-1992) and driving force behind Soundprint. Originally conceived by documentarians Jay Allison and Larry Massat, Soundprint is a weekly series of independently produced radio documentaries produced at WJHU-FM in Baltimore and aired on NPR stations. It's the longest-running documentary series in public radio, and has won numerous national and international awards.

== International Media Development ==
=== South Africa ===
William Siemering's first international foray came at the behest of the U.S. State Department. In 1993, he was invited to meet with two groups. The first was interested in reforming the South African Broadcasting Corporation (SABC), which, until then, had been the mouthpiece of the Apartheid government. The second was interested in starting community radio stations as part of the liberation struggle.

=== Open Society Institute ===
That same year, Siemering received the prestigious MacArthur Foundation Fellowship. Money was tight during this period so this funding provided key support for him to do further work in developing community radio for emerging democracies. He returned to South Africa the following year, this time with the Open Society Foundation for South Africa, and in 1995 as a Knight International Journalism Fellow. Siemering continued his collaboration with the Open Society Institute through 2003 with projects in several eastern European countries, Mongolia, Mozambique as well as South Africa. These efforts included developing guidelines for funding and capacity building, including organizing training programs, attendance at professional conferences and visits to radio stations in the United States.

Two themes emerged during this period. One was the sustainability of community radio. The financial, technical and infrastructural requirements for starting and maintaining a station may be substantially lower than they are for a newspaper, a television station or an internet outlet, but the challenges to keep them operational are daunting, especially in the poor communities where they are most needed. Financial sustainability is the most obvious, and it tends to receive—understandably—the most attention. Other attributes, however, also are crucial to a station's sustainability. These include clarity of purpose, open relationships with stakeholders, a reputation for journalistic integrity and independence, ongoing evaluation of programming, and a sense of ownership by the community

The other theme was the unrealized potential of radio itself. Despite the fact that it has extraordinary reach in impoverished and marginalized regions with high illiteracy, radio was often overlooked by donors and development organizations. When it was considered, more often than not, it was regarded more as a loudspeaker for their public service announcements than as a tool for change.

=== Developing Radio Partners ===
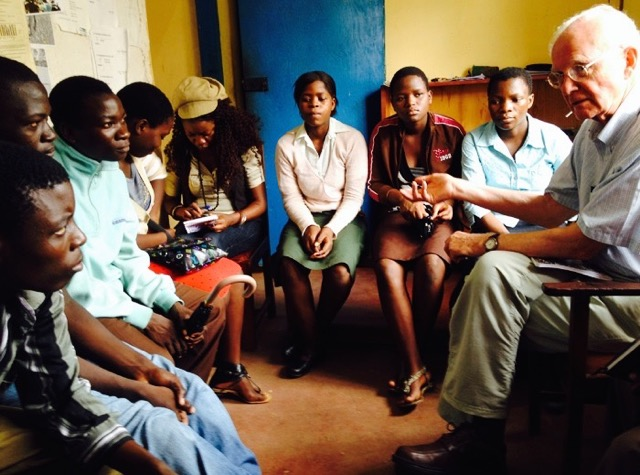
William H Siemering with producers of the youth program at Nkhotakota Community Radio in Malawi

In 2003, William Siemering founded the nonprofit Developing Radio Partners (DRP) with the expressed purpose of using radio to improve the flow of information to those who need it the most and are the hardest to reach. To achieve this, DRP works with local radio stations that have independent voices and explicit development objectives.

DRP core service provided local stations with a comprehensive and customized training program called Healthy Stations. These trainings, building upon the ideas sustainable community radio, covered topics such as station management, programming, journalistic standards, community engagement and ongoing evaluation. More recently, DRP has provided information in the form of weekly bulletins on topics ranging from conservation farming to energy efficient stoves as well as assessments of the local media landscape for international development organizations interested in capacity building for local media.

Through DRP, Siemering has worked with independent radio stations in countries ranging from Mongolia to Sierra Leone. In the latter, DRP partnered with Search for Common Ground and others to help develop independent media in a country devastated by a 10-year civil war. In turn, the Independent Radio Network played a major role in an exceptionally transparent and peaceful national election in 2007. Recent efforts include projects on best practices for agriculture in response to climate change in Cameroon, Cape Verde, Rwanda and Zambia, and on youth and reproductive health in Malawi.

=== Wyncote Foundation ===
William Siemering passed the leadership of Developing Radio Partners to the next generation at the end of 2017. He is currently Senior Fellow with the Wyncote Foundation.

== Quotes ==
=== Quotes by William Siemering ===
Radio is the most personal medium we have, because the human voice is so expressive. It's a storytelling medium and we all need storytelling.

... often times people think of radio as bringing information to people, kind of vertical. The unique strength of radio is a horizontal ... That's where people change their mind or modify their opinions perhaps or see other points of view.

Because radio is so flexible and personal, it will be here, as long as we continue to make it essential ... Our raw materials are ideas, culture, community, news and interesting people.

the only definition of 'broadcast' in 1901 [16 years before the start of broadcast radio] was 'to sow seeds.' This is still my favorite metaphor for public radio.

In one of the histories that's been written about NPR, they said that my colleagues on the executive level had 'disdain' for me when they saw who I had been hiring, because I thought that anyone could learn radio because I had worked in the ghetto and with students. And it's true, anyone can learn radio. The mechanics of it are quite simple. But what you can't teach as easily, certainly, is curiosity, and empathy, and being a good listener, which is the key to good interviewing of course."

... I think whatever talent I have is mainly just hiring good people, trying to see their gifts, and managing as I would like to be managed, which means being left alone as much as possible and, you know, have a clear job description, know what I'm supposed to do, be left alone to do it and bring as much as I can to it."

When I asked a manager of a station in Rwanda, what he considers success, he said, 'when a farmer calls us from the field and asks how he can turn cassava leaves into organic fertilizer or what pesticides to use. That is success because we've helped him and his life.' It is that practical stuff.

=== Quotes from National Public Radio Purpose ===
National Public Radio will serve the individual: it will promote personal growth; it will regard individual differences with respect and joy rather than derision and hate; it will celebrate the human experience as infinitely varied rather than vacuous and banal; it will encourage a sense of active constructive participation, rather than apathetic helplessness ...

...

The total service should be trustworthy, enhance intellectual development, expand knowledge, deepen aural esthetic enjoyment, increase the pleasure of living in a pluralistic society and result in a service to listeners which makes them more responsive, informed human beings and intelligent responsible citizens of their communities and the world.

...

It would not substitute superficial blandness for genuine diversity of regions, values, and cultural and ethnic minorities which comprise American society; it would speak with many voices and many dialects. The editorial attitude would be that of inquiry, curiosity, concern for the quality of life, critical, problem solving, and life loving. The listener should come to rely upon it as a source of information of consequence; that having listened has made a difference in his attitude toward his environment and himself.

...

Listeners should feel that the time spent with NPR was among their most rewarding in media contact. National Public Radio will not regard its audience as a 'market' or in terms of its disposable income, but as curious, complex individuals who are looking for some understanding, meaning and joy in the human experience.

=== Quotes about William Siemering ===
Eleven years after this radio debut, I heard - was told the real story by the fellow who, again, tapped me for the job, a man named Bill Siemering, ... that apparently there was quite a bit of opposition to me in the beginning from the managers, a number of managers of our station who said: A woman's voice is not authoritative. People will not take her seriously. Her voice does not carry well. It's too high - imagine this, being called too high. ... And Bill, in his wisdom, never told me that until so many years later, and it was a mark of his leadership, I felt. He knew it would throw me, and he had tremendous confidence in me, and he didn't want it to affect my performance. He felt if I were given a chance and just allowed to go, that people would change their minds toward it, and happily, they did.

—Susan Stamberg, former co-host of All Things Considered

Siemering's polite thoughtful manner masked a burning passion for social justice ... he was determined to change the status quo, to insist that listening to the radio not be a passive pursuit. On campus, he helped students cover anti-Vietnam War protests in a challenging, almost confrontational way. He reached out to the city's black ghetto to give voice to the unheard. He attacked exactly those areas of conflict from which most managers fled – race, class, the division between rich and poor, powerful and weak.

—Marc Fisher, author, Something in the Air, on Siemering's time at WBFO, SUNY, Buffalo

We are the products of seeds of thinking and action planted by Mr. Siemering. We are disciples who extend his ideas. We cherish knowing him because he gives our lives focus and brings meaning to our work. Tune around the radio dial and I guarantee you will hear Bill Siemering talking to you.

—Dennis Hamilton, former Vice President of Programming at Minnesota Public Radio

There's a special place for my fellow award recipient Bill Siemering. Bill gave me my first home in public radio. He hired me as a very green reporter ... and I entered a scrappy newsroom at WHYY in Philadelphia – my career was forged in that crucible of reporting, editing, hosting, and producing. The dream job came with the astounding privilege of learning from Terry Gross, Danny Miller, Dave Davies, Tia O'Brien, Carol Anne Clark Kelly, and Nick Peters. But especially Bill ... a beacon of leadership, public service and kind, close friendship. He is why I am standing here, and why each of you, too, have a job in something called public radio. I urge you to read Bill's founding document for NPR; it's on Current. It really does explain the values of public radio in a way no one has been able to since. Bill, like many of us, believes that public radio can make the world a better, more humane, place.

—John Barth, PRX

Bill Siemering, the man who wrote NPR's original statement of purpose, 'wanted something that was not, and is not, available in very many places on the radio dial,' wrote NPR host Linda Wertheimer. 'He wanted quietness. He wanted calm conversation, analysis and explication.' Critics agreed that he achieved this. In 1979, Time referred to All Things Considered as 'surely the most literate, trenchant and entertaining news program on radio.

—Susan J. Douglas, professor of Communication Studies at the University of Michigan

In cynical times, I like to go back and read @bsiemering's "National Public Radio Purposes" written in 1970. bit.ly/2anMMvj

—Jeff Brady, National Desk Reporter, NPR @jeffbradynpr

To many of us in South Africa, radio represents the hope of new beginnings, of a new democracy in which all the voices are heard. Bill has helped nurture the seeds of this new generation.

—Sue Valentine, former Executive Producer Radio News and Current Affairs for South African Broadcasting Corporation, former Director Media for Open Society Foundation for South Africa

== Honors and awards ==
- Edward R. Murrow Award from the Corporation for Public Broadcasting (1986)
- MacArthur Foundation Fellowship (1993)
- Honorary Doctorate of Law, Arcadia University (1995)
- NPR Lifetime Achievement Award (2000)
- Honorary Doctorate of Humane Letters, State University of New York at Buffalo (2001)
- Third Coast Festival Lifetime Achievement Award (2002)
- Civic Ventures Purpose Prize Fellow (2008)
- Purpose Prize Fellow (2008)
- Inducted into the Buffalo Broadcasters Hall of Fame (2010)
- Annenberg Scholar at Principia College (2017)
