= Hannah Kim =

Israeli journalist

- חנה קים
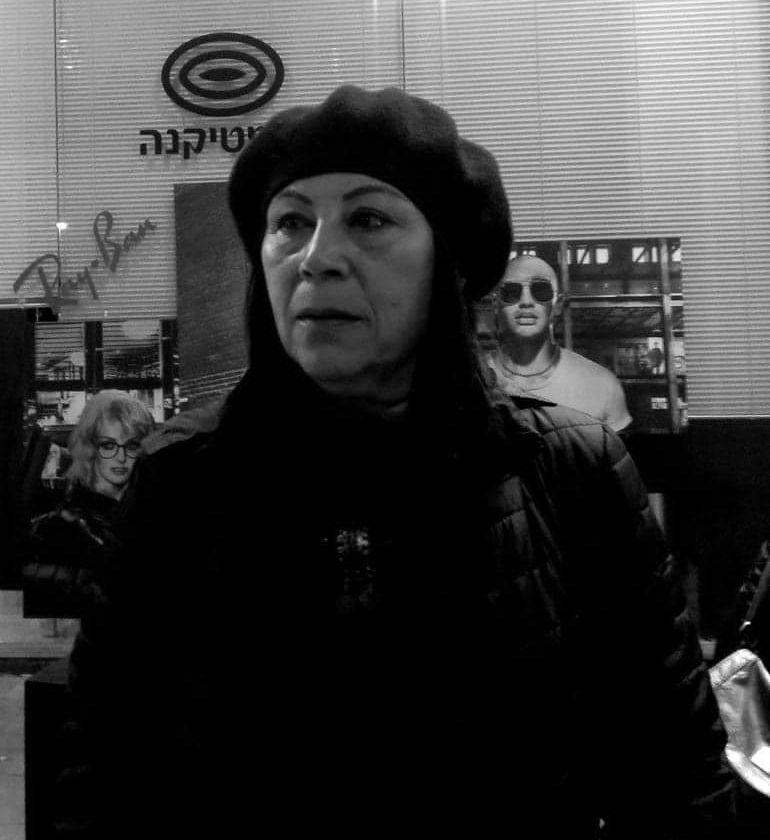
- Kim in 2017
- Born: 27 October 1957 (age 68); Haifa, Israel
- Education: Tel Aviv University
- Occupations: Journalist, activist
- Awards: Sokolov Award

Hannah Kim (Hebrew: חנה קים; born 27 October 1957) is an Israeli activist and investigative journalist.

== Biography ==
Hannah Kim was born in Haifa and graduated from Hugim High School in Haifa. She served in the Israel Defense Forces during the years 1976–1978 in the National Communication Battalion. She holds a BA in Hebrew and general literature, history of the Jewish people, history of the Land of Israel, general history, and film and art history at the Tel Aviv University.

== Journalism and literary career ==
In 1978, Kim began working as a journalist for Al HaMishmar, first as a correspondent for Tel Aviv and later as a political writer.

Following the death of Simeon Joshua in Kfar Shalem, Tel Aviv, who was shot by a policeman after he barricaded himself on the roof of his house following the construction crime which the deceased had committed, she published a series of investigative reports on building violations, which were committed by Avraham Shapira, Leon Recanati, Rami Ungar, and Rehavam Ze'evi, Chairman of Eretz Israel Museum. Following the recent investigation, Ze'evi was banned from entering the museum, and the journalists' association condemned it.

She published children's stories in Mishmar LeYeledim, edited by Shlomo Nitzan. One of the children's stories she wrote (I saw Elijah the prophet) was dramatized and broadcast in Kol Yisrael.

She revealed new documents from the Israeli Foreign Ministry archives. shedding light on the missed opportunity for peace between Israel and Egypt, two years before the Suez Crisis.

In 1986, she began working for the newspaper Ha'ir. In this year, for the first time, she published the peace initiative of Foreign Minister Moshe Sharett, about two years before the Suez Crisis, which sent an emissary on his behalf to President Gamal Abdel Nasser to reach a peace agreement with Egypt.

She revealed the scope of trade between Israel and South Africa, and her article was quoted in The Washington Post. She published discoveries about the economic ties between Israel and the Soviet Union, which included steel imports, despite the severing of relations between the two countries.

She wrote about a weapons deal between Israel and Iran, a year before the Iran–Contra affair, in which the chairman of the Israel Aerospace Industries Mordechai Hod, and the Akbar Hashemi Rafsanjani's contacts in Iran were involved.

She investigated trade relations between Israel and the Arab countries, in which transactions were exposed between Israel and Libya, Iraq, Kuwait, Saudi Arabia, Abu Dhabi, Bahrain and Morocco.

She held an interview with Dominica's Prime Minister, Eugenia Charles about the United States invasion of Grenada.

In November 1989, she wrote and edited The Hammer, a monthly magazine for social affairs. She was active in the homeless movement which was established that year, in which its activity tents were established throughout the country, mainly in the neighborhoods.

About a year later, she began working for Hadashot, until it was closed in 1993. At Hadashot, she founded the weekly supplement "Pressure", which she edited, for social and economic affairs. In the supplement, investigations were published about homeless children in Israel, malnutrition in neighborhoods and development towns, manifestations of racism against Ethiopian immigrants and poverty in the ultra Orthodox and the Arab sectors. For her work, she won a citation from the Sokolov Award.

In Hadashot, she wrote that Shimon Sheves, the director general of the Israeli Prime Minister's office, was appointed by Oren Shachor from the rank of a corporal to a captain, as well as a first comprehensive investigation of Benjamin Netanyahu, in which Bibi's millionaires' club was first published, with the names of its donors. She published an interview with the millionaire Gabi Tamman, who said: "Bibi is my race horse".

In 1994, she began working for Haaretz and published a political-social-economic column. She published weekly articles on the articles' page, and focused on the rule of law, the independence of the judicial system, and the preservation of the integrity of senior government officials, as well as the connection between capital and governing.

In Haaretz, she published revelations about the wars of the Shin Bet (the Israeli Security Agency) on Congo's soil, involving the head of the Shin Bet Head Office and some senior Shin Bet officials, who built the ruling army in front of the opposing army. She made the initial publication of the increased pensions of Arthur Israelovitz and Giora Eini, senior members of the Histadrut, and the increased pension of Shimon Sheves, as well as the first computer kits in the "Computer for Every Child" project, intended for needy children, were given to the two children of the Prime Minister Netanyahu. She published the first article on the opinion page of Haaretz in favor of a general strike. In 2004, she left Haaretz.

Prior to the elections to the nineteenth Knesset, she published on her Facebook page a series of notes and documents written by Netanyahu.

== Awards and recognition ==
Kim was awarded the Quality Knight Award of the year 1999 for Communication and Journalism. The reasons for the award were:

Hanna Kim's journalistic work involves collecting material from the field, cross-referencing, and verifying information. Her reporting has covered Israeli social and political topics, including arms deals and the treatment of immigrants, minorities, and foreign workers. Her work also focuses on politics and the rule of law.

- 1993 – Citation from the Sokolov Award Committee for the "Pressure" supplement in Hadashot and writing on social issues.
- 1999 – Knight of Quality Government Award from the Movement for Quality Government.

== Social activism ==
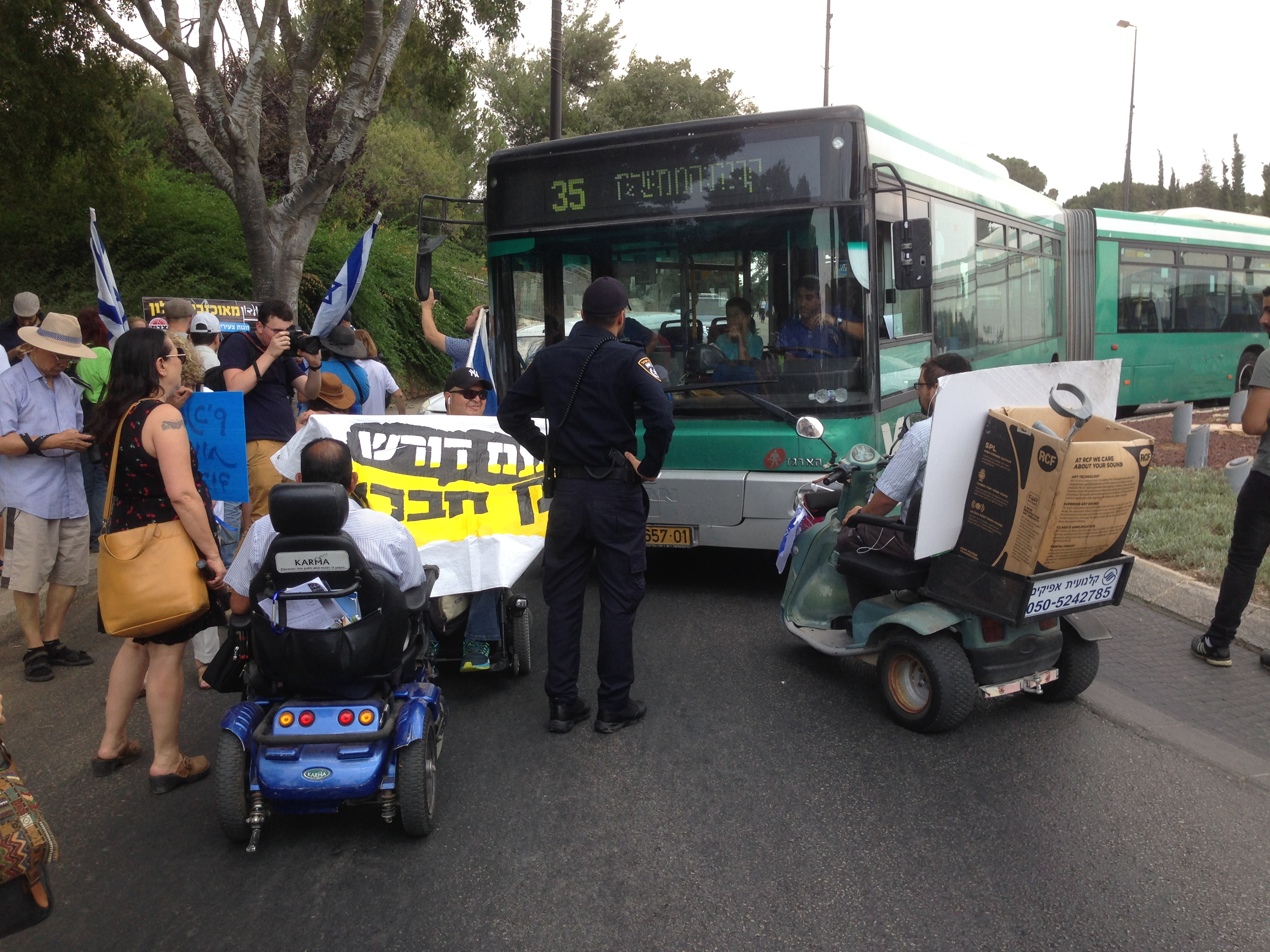
Hannah Kim in a black dress and her back to the camera, is demonstrating with Israeli disabled and elderly near the Knesset, 16 July 2018

In 2009 Kim founded, together with a group of parents, the Harim School in Giv'at Ada for students from the autistic spectrum. She is a member of the Audit Committee of the Association for Legal guardian which was established by parents and public figures to look after the future of helpless autistic people.

She was one of the leaders of the protest against the government corruption and for equality before the law. She organized and led the demonstrations in Petah Tikva, near the home of Attorney General, Avichai Mandelblit, and then the mass demonstrations which were begun in Tel Aviv. She opened the first demonstration in Tel Aviv with a speech which called on the Israelis to find a leader who would be a beacon, one masterpiece, and abandon their leaders accused of corruption. At that demonstration, Prof. Uzi Arad joined, and was introduced by Kim as a partner of moving the protest from Petah Tikva to Tel Aviv, as they had talked six months prior to the move.

As a mother of two children with autism, she took part in the struggle of Disabled Israelis for a minimum wage, and blocked vehicle traffic in Tel Aviv near Azrieli Center and in Jerusalem near the Knesset.

Kim was a member of the Me Too movement, and wrote in her Facebook page about two men who sexually harassed her. On 17 October 2018 Kim told Keren Neubach that she was harassed by Haim Ramon and by Dan Margalit.

== See also ==
- Israeli journalism
