= Don Quayle =

American businessman (1930–2015)

Donald R. Quayle
- Born: July 27, 1930
- Died: April 16, 2015 (aged 84)
- Citizenship: American
- Education: Utah State University
- Occupation: President of National Public Radio
- Years active: 1970–1973

Donald R. Quayle (July 27, 1930 – April 16, 2015) was an American broadcast journalist who was the first president of National Public Radio (NPR), from 1970 to 1973.

== Early life and education ==
Born in Logan, Utah, Quayle attended Utah State University, completing his undergraduate work in 1952. He earned a master's degree in theatre from Utah State and attended Ohio State University for further graduate work.

== Career ==
Quayle managed a radio station at Ohio State and, from 1960 to 1962, WGBH in Boston. Quayle was named a member of the board of directors of the Corporation for Public Broadcasting in 1968.

In 1970, he became the first president of NPR. Quayle and Bill Siemering, NPR's first program director, are considered NPR's "parents". In 1976 he was the senior vice president for programming at the Corporation for Public Broadcasting. In 1979, he became vice president for administration at WETA. He retired in 1989.

== Personal life ==
Quayle was a member of the Church of Jesus Christ of Latter-day Saints. On May 7, 2010, Quayle received an honorary doctorate of humane letters degree from Utah State University in recognition of his long career of significant contributions to public broadcasting in the United States. He died in 2015, aged 84.
