= Speer Goes to Hollywood =

Speer Goes To Holywood
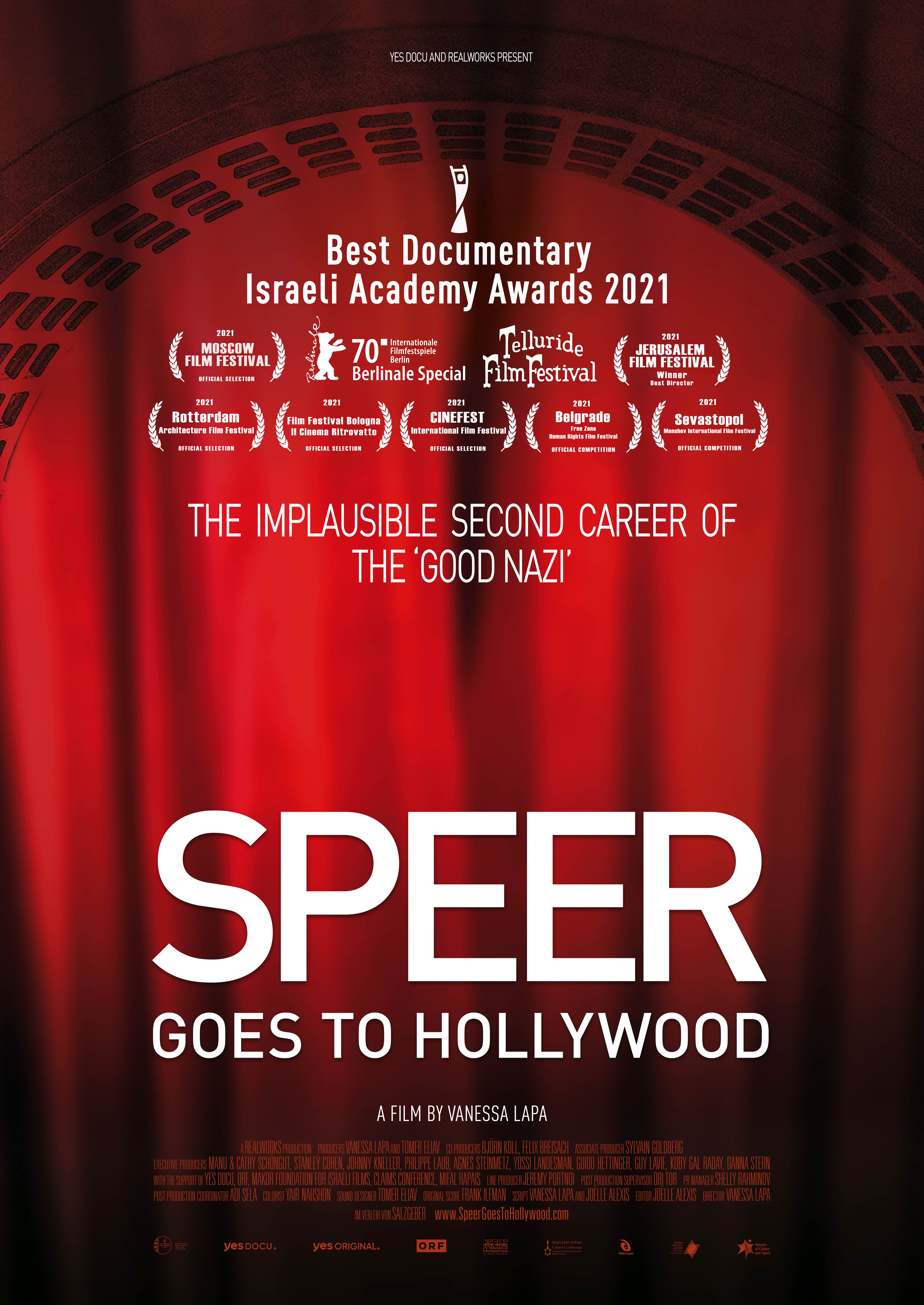
- Film poster
- שפאר בדרך להוליווד
- Directed by: Vanessa Lapa
- Produced by: Vanessa Lapa, Tomer Eliav
- Edited by: Joelle Alexis
- Production company: Realworks Ltd
- Release date: 2020
- Running time: 97 minutes
- Country: Israel
- Languages: English, French, German

Speer Goes to Hollywood is a 2020 Israeli documentary by director Vanessa Lapa, starring Albert Speer. The film premiered at the Berlin International Film Festival in February 2020 as part of the Berlinale Special. The Israeli premiere took place as part of the official competition of the Jerusalem Film Festival 2021, where Lapa won the Diamond Award for directing. The American premiere took place at the Telluride Film Festival in Colorado. The film won the Best Documentary by the Israeli Academy - Ophir Award for the year 2021.

== Synopsis ==
Speer Goes To Hollywood is based on forty hours of recorded conversations between screenwriter Andrew Birkin and Albert Speer, an architect and close ally of Adolf Hitler who served as the Minister of Armaments and War Production of Nazi Germany from 1942 to 1945.

In 1971, after the success of Speer's bestseller Inside the Third Reich, Paramount Studios wanted to adapt it into a film and Andrew Birkin went to discuss the script. The film was ultimately never produced.

Speer Goes To Hollywood did not use the actual audio from the 1970s and employed actors to recreate part of the conversation, including information from other interviews Speer had given.

In the film, Speer recalls the years of the Nazis' rise to power, to his role in World War II, to the Nuremberg trials. In the interviews, Speer whitewashes his involvement in Nazi atrocities such as extermination through labour and indifferently describes his alleged lack of awareness of The Holocaust.

== Reception ==
On the review aggregator website Metacritic, the film has a score of 61 based on seven reviews, indicating "generally favorable reviews".

Screendaily's Sarah Ward called the documentary "fascinating", adding "Lapa's documentary lays bare [Speer's] falsehoods in a dense, sober and compelling fashion". Jessica Kiang from Variety was more critical, writing that while the premise was a "potentially fascinating story", and that "a hazy picture of Speer's quite infuriating ability to obscure, evade or massage the truth... emerges", the film was "embellished" and "falls some way short".

Elad Shalev, the editor of the Israeli film portal Seret.co.il reports from Berlin, enjoyed the combination of several timelines, including videos from the Nuremberg trials, to show the contradictions and manipulations Speer tries to perform, in order to rewrite history. He also noted that the lack of explanatory narration allows the viewer to build the narrative by himself, and to try and understand who Speer was really. He said it was particularly relevant today in which rising populist leaders, old-fashioned fanaticism and racism, attempt to rewrite history.

Avner Shavit wrote in Walla News-Calture that this is a "crazy story", unbelievable even by the high standards to which the audience is accustomed from stories about the Holocaust, which again illustrates the composure with which the Nazis carried out their atrocities, and no less - the nonchalant innocence they tried to shake off and continue.

After the screening at the Jerusalem Film Festival, Sarah Peled wrote on the independent news site Megafon that the film is chilling, revealing the rendering mechanism of a cold-blooded man, for whom the value of human life was absent from his personality.

Marlin Venig wrote in Portfolio magazine that she found the film unique in the way it reflects the gap between Berlin's modern showcase, and the past hidden between its bricks and pasting its pattern. She points out that unlike other Holocaust films of all kinds, Vanessa Lapa, the film's director, in precise cinematic and archival work, and one of the most beautiful made here, weaves a story from an unexpected vantage point, drawing the viewers' attention precisely to oblivion - the oblivion of the masses that can give glory to the murderers as well.

Ofer Liebergel from the Israeli film blog Srita points out that Lapa's film is not just a film about a Nazi who tried and largely succeeded in clearing his name. It is also a film about the manipulative craft of storytelling. Precisely through a film that was not made and images that were not taken (against the background of archival material), the mechanism by which cinema can reshape consciousness was revealed. This is also reflected in the way in which Lapa, ostensibly without doing much, questions all of Speer's claims.

The blog HotJerusalem, which published an article about the recommended films for viewing at the Jerusalem Film Festival, wrote that Vanessa Lapa's new film, which follows the enigmatic character of Albert Speer, Hitler's secret man, is a fascinating and mesmerizing audio-visual document, created by an artist and archival material like recording conversations that was not intended for publication.

== Historical accuracy ==
After the release of the film questions arose around the recreation of the Birkin-Speer audio tapes by director Vanessa Lapa. Director Vanessa Lapa originally claimed that "Nothing is re-created. Everything from the tapes is re-recorded. This means 100% accurate to the original." However, audio recordings provided by Andrew Birkin to journalists showed that the film was not an entirely accurate picture of the taped conversations between Birkin and Speer in 1971 and 1972. Lapa later admitted that the film altered the conversation and used audio inspiration from other sources.

Lapa argued that the reason for re-enacting the audio was due to the poor quality; however, Filmmaker Errol Morris, who originally planned to work with Lapa on the documentary, said that there was no issue with the audio quality of the original tapes.

The Hollywood Reporter added an Addendum to its review: "Birkin has gone on the record to point out that Lapa’s film takes liberties with the material he recorded, and the director has acknowledged to some journalists that the lines read by the actors are compressed from the conversation on Birkin’s tapes and incorporate material from other interviews." The critic Glenn Kenny posted a lengthy article on RogerEbert.com that poses serious questions as to the authenticity of Lapa's film using audio obtained from Birkin and conversations with Errol Morris.

Naomi Pfefferman raised similar issues about the authenticity of the documentary on socaljewishnews.com as did P.J. Grisar on The Forward. See also Andrew Lapin’s article in The Times of Israel.

== See also ==
- Nazi concentration camps
- Krupp
