= Howard Arenstein =

American news correspondent

Howard Arenstein (born March 5, 1950) is an American news correspondent for CBS Radio and the radio bureau manager for CBS News in Washington, D.C.

== Early life and education ==
Arenstein earned an undergraduate degree from State University of New York at Buffalo and a master's degree in 1974 from the Annenberg School for Communication at the University of Pennsylvania.

== Career ==
From 1974 until 1981, Arenstein resided in Israel, working as a reporter for The Jerusalem Post and for Israeli Radio. In 1978, he was hired by United Press International as the wire service's Jerusalem bureau chief and as an editor on UPI's foreign desk in New York and Washington.

In 1984, Arenstein joined CBS News as a writer on the overnight CBS News television broadcast CBS News Nightwatch. In 1987, he began working for CBS Radio.

During his time at CBS News, Arenstein covered the impeachment process of President Clinton, the disputed United States presidential election, the September 11 attacks, the war in Iraq and the Beltway sniper attacks.

Arenstein won two individual Edward R. Murrow awards for outstanding journalism - one in 2002 for feature reporting, and one in 2006 for covering the first home game of the Washington Nationals baseball team.

== Legal problem ==
In 2010 Arenstein and his wife Orly Azoulay were arrested for marijuana possession with intent to distribute. Washington police received a complaint that the couple was growing marijuana in their backyard and obtained a search warrant. During the raid the police found large cannabis plants standing more than 8 feet high. However, Howard Arenstein was never convicted of any crime due to the arresting officer not appearing at the preliminary hearing. The charges later were dropped after prosecutors could not locate a witness.
