= Inside the Third Reich =

1969 memoir by Albert Speer

- Cover of the German first edition
- Author: Albert Speer
- Original title: Erinnerungen
- Translators: Richard and Clara Winston
- Language: German
- Subject: Autobiography
- Publisher: Orion Books
- Publication date: 1969
- English publication date: 1970, 1995 & 2003
- Media type: Print
- Pages: 832
- ISBN: 978-1-84212-735-3
- OCLC: 87656

Inside the Third Reich (German: Erinnerungen, 'memories') is a memoir written by Albert Speer, the Nazi Minister of Armaments from 1942 to 1945, serving as Adolf Hitler's main architect before this period. It is considered to be one of the most detailed descriptions of the inner workings and leadership of Nazi Germany, but is controversial because of Speer's lack of discussion of Nazi atrocities and questions regarding his degree of awareness or involvement with them.

At the Nuremberg Trials, Speer was sentenced to 20 years in prison for his use of prisoners in the armaments factories while Minister of Armaments. From 1946 to 1966, while serving the sentence in Spandau Prison, he penned more than 2,000 manuscript pages of personal memoirs. His first draft was written from March 1953 to 26 December 1954. After his release on 1 October 1966, he used Federal Archive documents to rework the material into his autobiography. He was aided editorially by Wolf Jobst Siedler, Ullstein and Propylaen, and Joachim Fest.

The manuscript led to two books: first Erinnerungen ('recollections') (Propyläen/Ullstein, 1969), which was translated into English and published by Macmillan in 1970 as Inside the Third Reich; then as Spandauer Tagebücher ('Spandau diaries') (Propyläen/Ullstein, 1975), which was translated into English and published by Macmillan in 1976 as Spandau: The Secret Diaries.

== Summary ==
Inside the Third Reich begins with an account of Speer's childhood, followed by a description of his role as Heinrich Tessenow's assistant at the Technische Hochschule in Charlottenburg (now Technische Universität Berlin). Speer first heard Adolf Hitler speak during an address to the combined students and faculty of Berlin University and his institute. Speer states he became hopeful when Hitler explained how communism could be checked and Germany could recover economically. Speer joined the National Socialist Party in January 1931; he wrote "I was not choosing the NSDAP, but becoming a follower of Hitler, whose magnetic force had reached out to me the first time I saw him and had not, thereafter, released me." Speer described the personalities of many Nazi officials, including Joseph Goebbels, Hermann Göring, Heinrich Himmler, Rudolf Hess, Martin Bormann, and, of course, Hitler himself. Speer went on to quote Hitler as telling him privately after the remilitarization of the Rhineland, "We will create a great empire. All of the Germanic peoples will be included in it. It will begin in Norway and extend to northern Italy. I myself must carry this out."

The main body of the book effectively ends when Speer, by this point having joined Karl Dönitz's government seated in Schleswig-Holstein, receives news of Hitler's death. This is followed by an epilogue dealing with the end of the war in Europe and the resulting Nuremberg trials, in which Speer was sentenced to a 20-year prison term for his actions during the war.

=== Special weapons ===
Starting in April 1942, Speer became aware of the potential of German nuclear research in developing, in his words, "a weapon which could annihilate whole cities." Werner Heisenberg told Speer "the scientific solution had already been found and that theoretically nothing stood in the way of building such a bomb." Yet development and production would take at least two years. This led to the development of Germany's first cyclotron. By the autumn of 1942 however, the estimated period for developing a weapon had increased to three to four years, much too long to affect the war. Instead, development turned to a "uranium motor", for use in the navy's submarines. Finally, in the summer of 1943, Speer released the 1,200 tonnes (2.6 million pounds) of uranium stock for use in solid-core ammunition. Speer states that even if Germany concentrated all of its resources, it would have been 1947 before they could have had an atom bomb.

Speer describes Wunderwaffen such as the Me 262 project, flying wing jet planes, a remote-controlled flying bomb, a rocket plane, a rocket missile based on infrared homing, designs for a four engined jet bomber with the range to strike New York, and a torpedo based on sonar. He also cites the use of the V-2 as a terror weapon, rather than continued development of the ground-to-air defensive Waterfall rocket.

=== Holocaust and slave labor ===
Speer's involvement with concentration camp prisoners as a work force began when Hitler agreed to Himmler's proposal they be used for the secret V-2 project. Speer's joint undertaking with the SS leadership resulted in the creation of Mittelwerk ('central works') for underground production of the V-2. He goes on to say that at the Nuremberg Trial he stated he "had to share the total responsibility for all that had happened", and that he "was inescapably contaminated morally". Finally, Speer states, "Because I failed at the time, I still feel, to this day, responsible for Auschwitz in a wholly personal sense."

== Reception ==
Initially, public reaction to the book was positive. In a 23 August 1970 review published in The New York Times, John Toland wrote that the book "is not only the most significant personal German account to come out of the war but the most revealing document on the Hitler phenomenon yet written. It takes the reader inside Nazi Germany on four different levels: Hitler's inner circle, National Socialism as a whole, the area of wartime production and the inner struggle of Albert Speer. I recommend this book without reservations. Speer's full length portrait of Hitler has unnerving reality. The Führer emerges as neither an incompetent nor a carpet‐gnawing madman but as an evil genius of warped concepts endowed with an ineffable personal magic." A review by Kirkus Reviews on 27 August 1970 stated, "Speer's portrayals of the Nazi leadership, of the constant intrigues and rivalries among Hitler's entourage, and of Hitler himself, his histrionic virulence, his banality, and his peculiar magic, are engrossing and revealing."

Historians, however, have questioned the truthfulness of Speer's account from the beginning; as early as 1973, Barbara Miller Lane summarized in a Bryn Mawr College review: "Scholars have observed so many gaps in his account of the operation of his ministry as to shed considerable doubt on the whole." Matthias Schmidt's 1982 book Albert Speer: The End of a Myth (English edition 1984), Martin Kitchen's 2015 biography and Magnus Brechtken's 2017 work Albert Speer - Eine deutsche Karriere come to a similar conclusion.

A particular point of criticism is the claim that Speer pretended that he was unaware of the extermination camps and presented the figure of a "good Nazi". This criticism is mainly presented in the documentary film Speer Goes to Hollywood, by the director Vanessa Lapa. The film presents original videos from the Nazi Germany period and conversations with Speer, in which the great deception he tried to present at the Nuremberg trials and in his book is revealed. (Note: Sarah Word from the British film magazine Screen International through its website ScreenDaily reported after the world premiere at the Berlin International Film Festival (2020), that this is a fascinating documentary. She adds that almost four decades after his death, Speer's false position is no longer unshakable, nor is his command of the war on 12 million slave laborers [rewrite needed] questionable. She claimed that Lapa's documentary exposes the lies in a "dense, sober and convincing way".)

== Sources ==
- Brechtken, Magnus (2017). Albert Speer - Eine deutsche Karriere. ISBN 978-3-8275-0040-3.
- "Inside the Third Reich". Kirkus Reviews.
- Kitchen, Martin (2015). Speer, Hitler's Architect. Yale Books.
- Lane, Barbara Miller (1973). "Review of 'Inside the Third Reich: Memoirs', by Albert Speer" (PDF). Journal of the Society of Architectural Historians. 32: 341–346. S2CID 56399040. Archived from the original (PDF) on 3 March 2019 – via Semantic Scholar.
- Toland, John (23 August 1970). "Inside the Third Reich". The New York Times.
- Schmidt, Matthias (1984). Albert Speer: The End of a Myth. ISBN 031201709X.
- Speer, Albert (1995). Inside the Third Reich. London: Weidenfeld & Nicolson. ISBN 9781842127353.
- Ward, Sarah (2 March 2020). "'Speer Goes To Hollywood': Berlin Review". Screendaily.
