= Popolitica =

Popolitica (Hebrew: פּוֹפּוֹלִיטִיקָה lit. pop-politics) was an Israeli Television program, in which the public agenda was debated on in a round table. The participants included a regular "panel" that appeared regularly on the show, and an additional guest participants related to the specific debate of each show. The show was canceled, but was inscribed in the Israeli public memory, following a unique Israeli outright-blatant style of debate that has evolved among the regular participants. The show is a milestone program, having formulated a new political-Talk show format.

== History ==
'Popolitica' 1993 show

The show was first aired in 1992, on the Israeli public Channel 1, formulated by producer Aaron Goldfinger, who envisioned a show in which political debates are taking place, and in the midst of these debates, small breaks that will include pop music, in an in-studio playing, that will be conducted by various singers and bands – and so the show was granted its name Popolitica (Pop+Politics). Within a short period of time, the show developed its characteristic format, and was regularly hosted by two veteran news and political show hosts, Nissim Mishal and later, Dan Margalit, and included the regular following "panel": journalist Tommy Lapid (later made a political career out of his "stardom" as "panelist" of the show), journalist Amnon Dankner, and Haredi journalist Yisrael Eichler (also later made a political career out of his "panelist" role). The pop songs were gradually thinned out until they were completely removed, in a way that only the political-debates format remained, the debates that had granted the show its fame.

The show was aired on Israeli channel 1 until 1998, when the "panelists" and the host left channel 1, and the show and its format were moved to the commercial Channel 2.

== 'Popolitica' style ==
The panel team, who are known for their argumentative abilities and sharp tongues, have made waves among the Israeli public. The Israeli secular-right and conservative voice was represented by then Journalist Tommy Lapid, Journalist Amnon Dankner expressed the secular-liberal left, and Haredi Journalist Yisrael Eichler raised the voice of the Haredi sector. The characters of the panel team, as was reflected on the show, and other additional special guests with an argumentative style, that were brought for the purpose of each show's specific debate, have all together created a fermenting atmosphere, full of inflammation, while the host was not always able to control either the debate or sometimes even the panel or its special guests. Occasionally, at the hype of the argument, one participant would even leave the studio angrily, a "live" departure on television. In other occasions, the arguments came close to a skirmish event.

== 'Popolitica' legacy ==
The show's style has gained high ratings but also conflicting reactions. Many reported loving to watch and listen to the arguments of the show, but others saw in it mainly an extreme expression of poor and cheap Populism, aimed at glorifying the regular participants' abilities, while humiliating people with different political opinions or some who are not accustomed to such loud debates. The show's style was inscribed in the Israeli public memory, and its format-style was later reflected on many other political-debate shows, which have practically continued the original 'Popolitica' show, with its noisy debates, that makes an impression on the audience and gains high ratings. The word 'Popolitica' was coined in Israel as a synonym for Populism and Demagogy; It is being used when one wants to describe an inflammated argument with a fluent spokes people who use an outright-blatant style.

The show also coined some famous quotes: "I didn't interrupt you - you don't interrupt me!" (Hebrew: אני לא הפרעתי לך, אל תפריע לי), or, "Let me finish a sentence" (Hebrew: תן לגמור משפט)

== The program, its "panel" and 'Moetzet HaHakhamim' show ==
'Popolitica' was canceled and other Israeli channels attempted to revive its format-style under new program names. Many believe that the "panel" team made their way to a better career through the show. Journalist Tommy Lapid lead the Shinui party with his rhetorical abilities, previously observed on the show, into the Israeli parliament, the Knesset, and was elected on a wave of his popularity from the show to head that party, and then appointed to be a Cabinet Minister. Journalist Amnon Dankner, made his way in journalism, among others, after the show, he became the chief editor of the second largest Israeli newspaper, Maariv, and Haredi Journalist Yisrael Eichler also made a career in politics when he was elected, after the show, to be a Knesset member with United Torah Judaism party. The original show was reunited for a one-time reunion on Israeli Channel 10, a day prior to the 2006 Israeli legislative election. The show, at the time, was about to return with its regular format (on the same commercial channel 10), however, the original creators demanded from the host, Journalist Dan Margalit to remove the original title-name 'Popolitica', for various Copyright reasons, and the old-new show was renamed 'Moetzet HaHakhamim' (lit. Council of [Toarh] Scholars). Haredi Journalist Yisrael Eichler has retired from the old-new show, and his place was filled, for a short period of time, by the Haredi well-known politician Aryeh Deri. Over time, a new "panel" team was established that included: The host, Dan Margalit, the veteran panelists, Journalists Tommy Lapid and Amnon Dankner, and new regular panelists, right-wing Likud Knesset member, Tzipi Hotovely, and known Haaretz liberal news paper Journalist, Ari Shavit. 'Moetzet HaHakhamim' kept up the "good work", and debates on the show - just like in the original show of 'Popolitica' - rose to high tones, until the show went to a long break in December 2007, to be filled in, in its airing time by Survivor 10: The Caribbean.

As of today (2010), another version of the original show is aired on the public Israeli channel 1, renamed "Politica" (Politics), and hosted by Oded Shahar.
