= The Decent One =

- Film poster
- Der Anständige
- Directed by: Vanessa Lapa
- Written by: Vanessa Lapa; Ori Weisbrod
- Produced by: Felix Breisach
- Cinematography: Hermann Poelking-Eiken
- Edited by: Noam Amit; Sharon Brook
- Music by: Daniel Salomon; Jonathan Sheffer; Gil Feldman
- Production company: Realworks
- Release date: February 9, 2014 (BIFF)
- Running time: 96 minutes
- Countries: Israel; Austria; Germany
- Language: German
- Budget: €1.2 million
- Box office: $20,240 (US)

The Decent One (German: Der Anständige) is a 2014 German-Austrian-Israeli documentary directed by Vanessa Lapa about Heinrich Himmler. The film was based on a cache of letters and diary entries that were purchased by Lapa's parents and published in the German newspaper Die Welt. It premiered at the Berlin International Film Festival and received mixed reviews.

== Synopsis ==
The film is a biographical documentary produced and directed by Vanessa Lapa that explores the life of Heinrich Himmler, a leading figure in the Nazi regime and a key architect of the Holocaust. The film presents a compilation of source materials, including diaries, love letters, and official reports, read by unseen actors, alongside archival footage

The documentary traces Himmler’s anti-Semitic beliefs to his college years and examines his relationship with his wife, Margarete, who expressed both affection and discomfort regarding his political activities. It highlights Himmler’s rationalizations for his role in the Nazi regime and his systematic extermination efforts.

Lapa emphasizes Himmler’s ability to compartmentalize his identity as a loyal German while orchestrating mass murder. The film illustrates his detachment and focus on the Final Solution, even in the face of Germany’s impending defeat.

== Cast ==
- Tobias Moretti as Heinrich Himmler
  - Lenz Moretti as younger Heinrich Himmler
- Sophie Rois as Margarete Himmler
- Antonia Moretti as Gudrun Himmler
- Lotte Ledl as Hedwig Potthast
- Florentín Groll as Gebhard Himmler
- Pauline Knof as Anna Himmler

== Production ==
US Army soldiers seized the documents used in the film from the Himmler household. Against orders, they failed to hand over the evidence to their superiors and divided it into two groups: early life and contemporary documents. The early life documents were eventually sold to the Hoover Institution, but the contemporary documents have no recorded trail until Chaim Rosenthal, an Israeli artist and diplomat, acquired them. Rosenthal announced in 1982 that he had purchased the letters from an adjutant to Karl Wolff, though he is rumored to have purchased them in America; the Times of Israel tracks his purchase potentially to an American flea market in the 1960s. Philip Oltermann wrote in The Guardian that the documents failed to generate much interest because of the faked Hitler Diaries. However, Himmler's documents were later authenticated by the German Federal Archives. In 2006, Lapa's parents purchased the later documents with the intention of having their daughter create a documentary based on them. Lapa said that her generation was the first one far removed enough from the Holocaust to be able to make the film.

== Release ==
The Decent One premiered at the Berlin International Film Festival. Lapa, her parents, and her grandparents attended the premiere; Katrin Himmler also appeared and discussed her great-uncle. Timed with the release of the film, the German newspaper Die Welt controversially published several of the documents to accusations of sensationalism. Also timed with the release of the film, Katrin Himmler co-wrote a book, Himmler Privat. Kino Lorber released the film in the United States on October 1, 2014.

== Reception ==
Rotten Tomatoes, a review aggregator, reports that 67% of 18 surveyed critics gave the film a positive review; the average rating was 6.8/10. Metacritic rated it 55/100 based on 11 reviews. Writing in Variety, Joe Leydon called it "a fascinating portrait" that distinguishes itself by its novelty value. Leydon said that the choice to add sound effects to the archival footage makes their use heavy-handed. Jordan Mintzer of The Hollywood Reporter wrote that the film will interest historians and enthusiasts, though "the household anecdotes can grow tiring" and called the use of sound effects "cinematic overkill". Nicolas Rapold of The New York Times wrote, "[T]he voice-over-driven readings and the illustrative footage – unwisely augmented with new sound effects – lack a fundamental filmic momentum." Robert Abele of the Los Angeles Times also criticized the use of sound effects for the archival footage, but wrote, "At its most effective, though, The Decent One reveals a psychological portrait of a man devoted to his family yet consumed by a soul-blackening and horrifically destructive cause." The Village Voice's Simon Abrams called the documentary's focus on Himmler's family life "myopic" and wrote that it illuminates nothing but "unexamined hatred". Writing in Salon.com, Andrew O'Hehir called it "the most haunting documentary I’ve ever seen". Keith Uhlich of Time Out New York rated it 3/5 stars and said of the sound effects, "History shouldn’t be slicked up with Dolby, especially when, as here, it's so enlightening of the depths to which the human soul can sink." Lisa Barnard of The Toronto Star rated it 2.5/4 stars and wrote, "Lapa leaves it to us to determine how a man could be so unaware of his moral failings, but some perspective from the filmmaker would have been helpful." Brad Wheeler of The Globe and Mail also rated it 2.5/4 stars, writing, "The director sometimes ham-handedly embellishes the readings of notes written by Himmler, his wife, his mistress and his daughter with music and sound effects, but the film works best when it is at its most austere." Hannah Brown of The Jerusalem Post wrote, "It's a virtuoso feat of documentary filmmaking, but one that is both disturbing and demanding."
