= Magnus Brechtken =

German historian

Magnus Brechtken Adjunct Professor

Personal details
- Born: 1964 (age 61–62) Munich, Germany
- Occupation: Historian, lecturer
- Profession: Higher education

Magnus Brechtken (born 21 March 1964) is a German historian. He is the deputy director of the Institute of Contemporary History in Munich and teaches at LMU Munich. In 2017, he wrote a biographical study of Albert Speer, which won the 2017 NDR Culture Award for Non-fiction.

== History ==
Since 2012 Brechtken has been deputy director of the Institute of Contemporary History in Munich and teaches as an adjunct professor at LMU Munich.

== Albert Speer biography ==
In 2017 Brechtken published a biographical study of Albert Speer that received a positive reception from critics and reached No. 8 in the Der Spiegel bestseller list. Sven Felix Kellerhoff, reviewing the book in Die Welt, said it was now impossible to spread the myth that Speer was the "good Nazi". Robert Probst said in the Süddeutsche Zeitung that Brechtken had produced a comprehensive account of Speer and praised the depth and rigour of the work.
