= Orly Azoulay =

American writer and journalist

- אורלי אזולאי
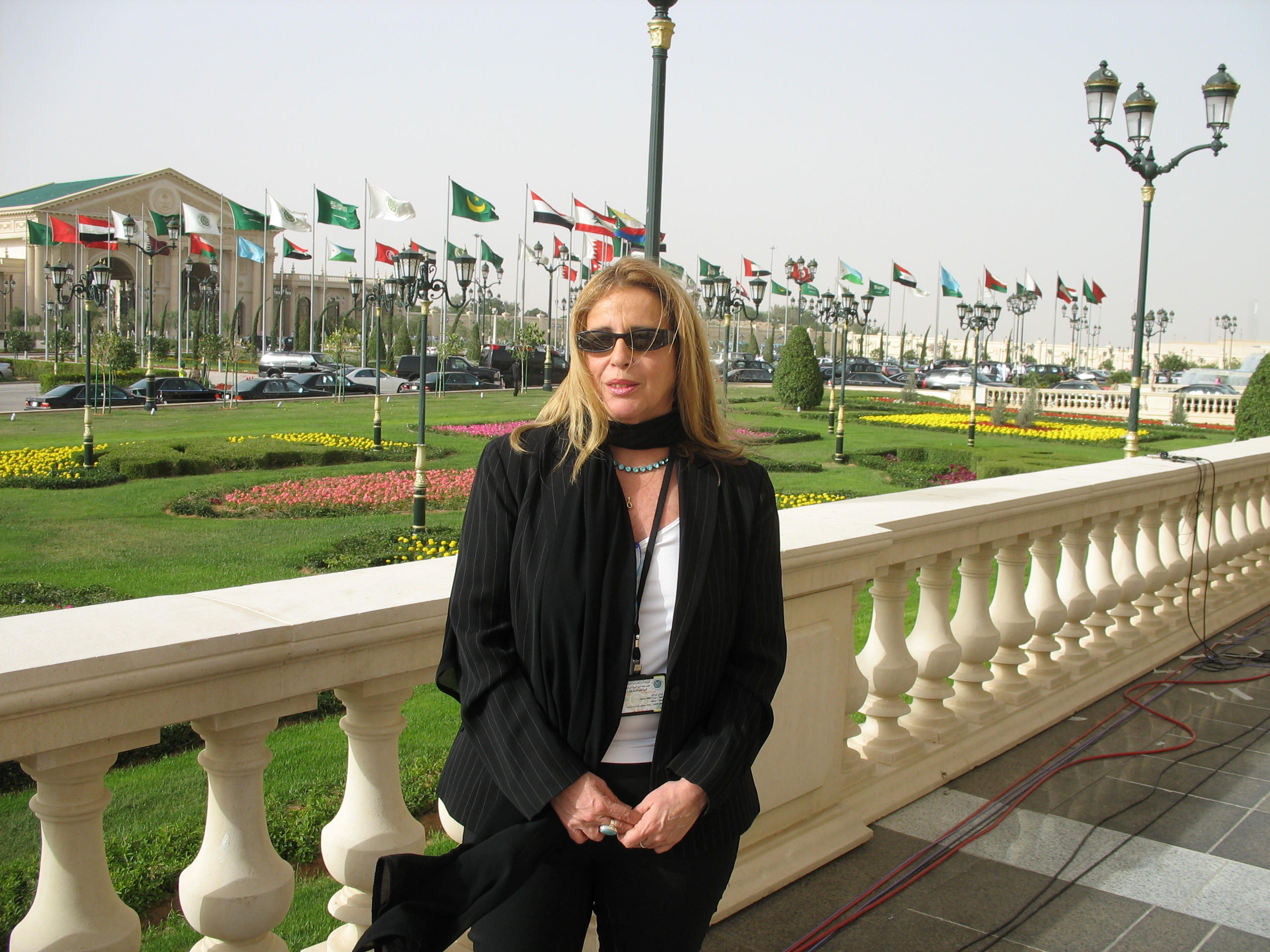
- Orly Azoulay in Riyadh during the Arab summit in 2007.
- Born: 1953 (age 72–73); Rishon Lezion, Israel
- Occupations: Journalist, political writer
- Employer: Yedioth Ahronoth

Orly Azoulay (Hebrew: אורלי אזולאי; born 1953) is an Israeli-American journalist and political writer who works for Yedioth Ahronoth.

== Biography ==
Orly Azoulay was born in Rishon Lezion in Israel. She began her career in journalism during her service in the Israel Defense Forces (IDF) as a reporter during the Yom Kippur War. After her release from the army, she joined Yedioth Ahronoth and was its correspondent in Hasharon and Netanya. During this time, she wrote many articles about crime in Netanya.

Azoulay was one of the only journalists prosecuted for judicial offenses. In 1978, she published a favorable article about a convicted criminal two days before the verdict. Azoulay was convicted under article 41 of the law and was imposed a fine. In 1981 the district court dismissed the appeal.

In 1993, she moved to Paris as a correspondent for Yedioth Ahronoth. In this position, she covered peace talks between Israelis and Palestinians.

In 1996, Azoulay went to Israel to cover the elections and then she went to Washington as a correspondent for a U.S. newspaper. She covered peace conferences including the Wye River Summit, the 2000 Camp David Summit and the Shepherdstown Summit. She has reported on the "Axis of Evil" from Iran, Iraq and North Korea. She was the first Israeli journalist commissioned to King's Palace in Riyadh and covered the Arab League summit. The Saudi government initially declined to grant her a visa, on the grounds that Saudi Arabia does not recognize Israel, but reversed the decision after direct orders from the Foreign Minister Saud Al-Faisal following a phone call from Ban Ki-moon. She has reported from areas of tension around the world including Afghanistan, Pakistan, Kuwait, Qatar and on Hezbollah in Beirut.

== 2015 trip to Iran ==
In March 2015, Orly Azoulay visited Iran. This was the first documented trip of an Israeli journalist to post-Revolution Iran, although Azoulay reports that she has visited Iran several times previously. She visited Iranian Jewish communities and synagogues in Tehran and Isfahan. She further visited the Tomb of Esther and Mordechai in Hamedan. In her article about the trip, Azoulay reported that she traveled to Iran with an American passport. However, Iranian authorities realized that she had Israeli citizenship because she was born in Israel. Subsequently she was only fingerprinted and was allowed to enter the country and travel freely within the duration of her visit. She spent two weeks in Iran and posted several photos of the trip.

== Published works ==
- The man who didn't know how to win — a biography of Shimon Peres
- The man who defeated himself — on the political battle between Benjamin Netanyahu and Ehud Barak
- Obama - He has a dream — on the 2008 U.S. presidential election
- The Battle for America — a journey on the breaking line
