= Cartel seat (monument) =

Cartel seats as monuments were the headquarters or other premises of historical, no longer existing cartels in the sense of a group of cooperating, but potentially also rival enterprises. Often, these associations had been syndicate cartels, being an advanced form of entrepreneurial combination because of their tight organization with a common sales agency. The cartel buildings had been used for secretariats, meeting rooms, sales offices, advertising agencies, research departments and further more. Many such historical buildings can still be found in Europe and the United States.

== Cartel buildings as architectural remains ==
In the decades between 1870 and 1945, cartels had been widespread as organizational forms of the economy. While loose price cartels and other more or less informal gentlemen's agreements" did not impose any requirements relating to fixed permanent premises, this was particularly the case with “syndicate cartels" being entrepreneurial combinations with centralized sales offices. Hundreds of administrative employees could work in such cartel establishments. The respective buildings were regularly stately, often representative and richly decorated with façade ornaments. In Europe, despite substantial war losses and demolitions, many of these cartel buildings are still preserved. Mostly, however, they have become simpler in their appearance, because later owners did not restore the original ornaments (easily recognizable at the headquarters of the Potash Syndicate (Stassfurt and Berlin, Germany) and of the Comptoir de Longwy, France). To the monument category of large cartel seats, one could add the buildings also of historic economic planning associations, which are considered to be similar to a cartel. They existed mainly before and during the Second World War.

== Recognition as cultural monuments ==
In terms of their heritage value, historic cartel buildings could be equated with historic headquarters of large companies or corporate groups. However, this has not been put into practice: A number of buildings around the world have been designated and protected as historical corporate headquarters, but not a single former cartel seat has been signposted as such. If historic cartel buildings are actually under heritage protection, they are listed for other reasons of remembrance. Conversely, stately buildings have been demolished in the past, without any regard to their historical importance as cartel seats. The cartel specialist Holm Arno Leonhardt pointed out in 2013 how important certain cartels had been for economic development in the 19th century, such as the sales organizations for coal and steel in the Rhine-Ruhr-area of Germany: The Rhenish-Westphalian Coal Syndicate and the German Stahlwerksverband. For this reason he pleaded for the distinct „regionalwirtschaftliche Organisationskunst" (= expertise for regional economic development) of the syndicate cartels to be an intangible cultural heritage and put under UNESCO world cultural heritage protection before being forgotten. Suitable places of remembrance in Germany were Düsseldorf (steel sales) and Essen (coal sales). Significant memorial plaques were to be set up at both locations. The reasons for the conspicuous reluctance of the historic preservation authorities and the established historians in relation to historical cartel buildings can be found in the taboo, which after the Second World War was installed by the general cartel ban. Cartels have been criminalized and positive statements about them belong to the 'inspeakable'. The initiative to consider cartel buildings as historically worth remembering came only from critical scientific positions or from civil society, for example from the association "Rhein-Neckar-Industriekultur eV", Mannheim, which dedicated an illustrated presentation to the local branch of the former Rhenish lignite syndicate.

== Examples of historical cartel buildings ==
=== Austria (Vienna) ===
The Austrian cartel system was definitely dominated by the city of Vienna as the political and administrative center of Austria-Hungary or of the republican Austria. The historical Viennese cartel landscape was characterized by a graduated geographical scope of the recognizable cartels. The responsibility of these associations ranged from the wider town area (in most cases craft cartels) via Lower Austria, crownland/republic Austria, the Austrian part of the Habsburg monarchy, the whole Austria-Hungary up to an international or global reach. In terms of architecture, the Viennese cartel residences don't stand out: They feature the same pomp style as the neighboring buildings and are not marked with specific trade symbols. Removals of cartel seats, mainly of smaller administrations, which fitted into large apartments, can be ascertained.

==== International ====
- International Ferrosilicon Company in Vienna, Universitätsstr. 11 (up to 1930) and (since 1931) in Hegelgasse 13 (both Inner City), obviously only in rented flats.
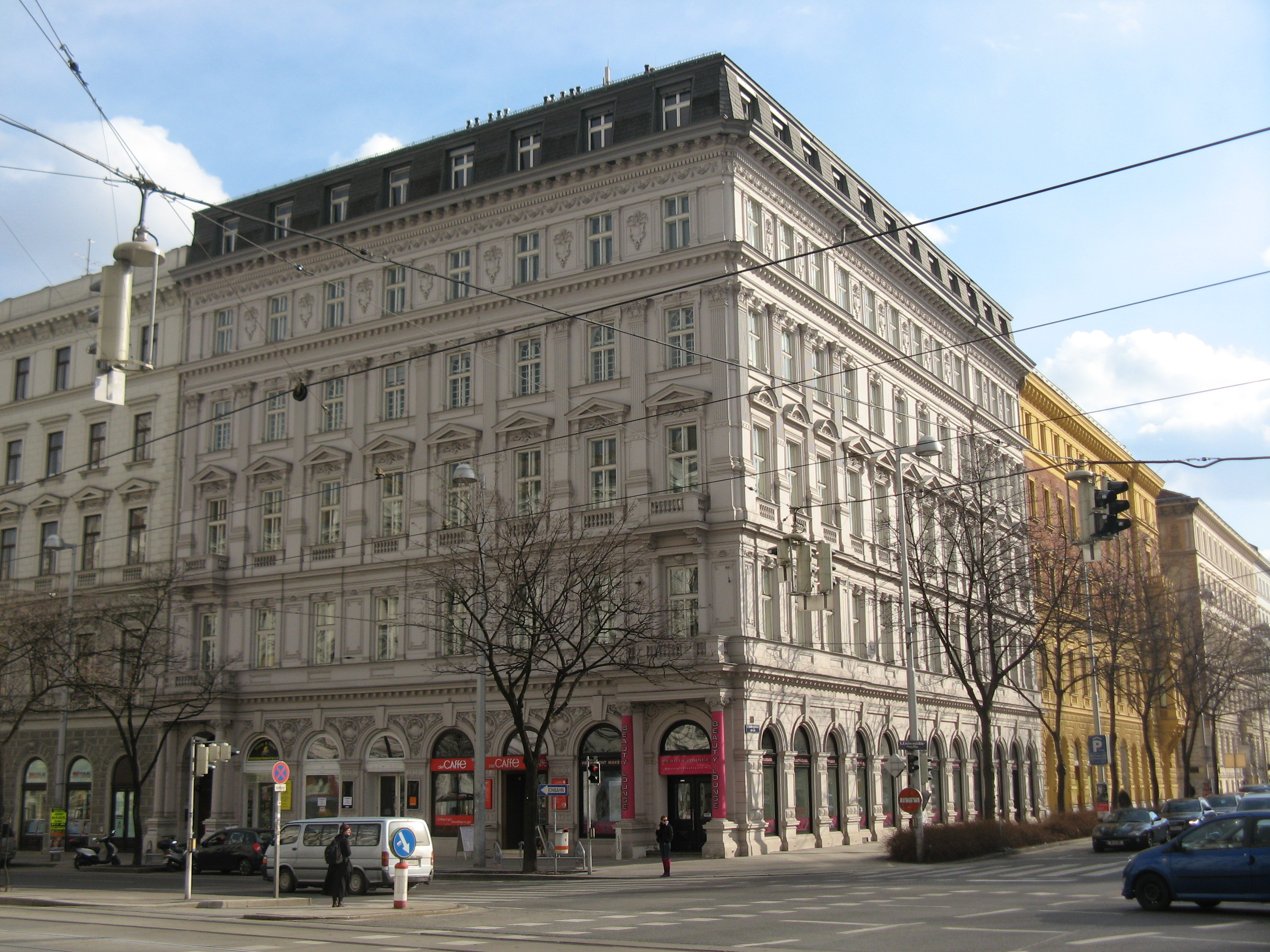
Ferrosilicon Company (Universitätsstr. 11)

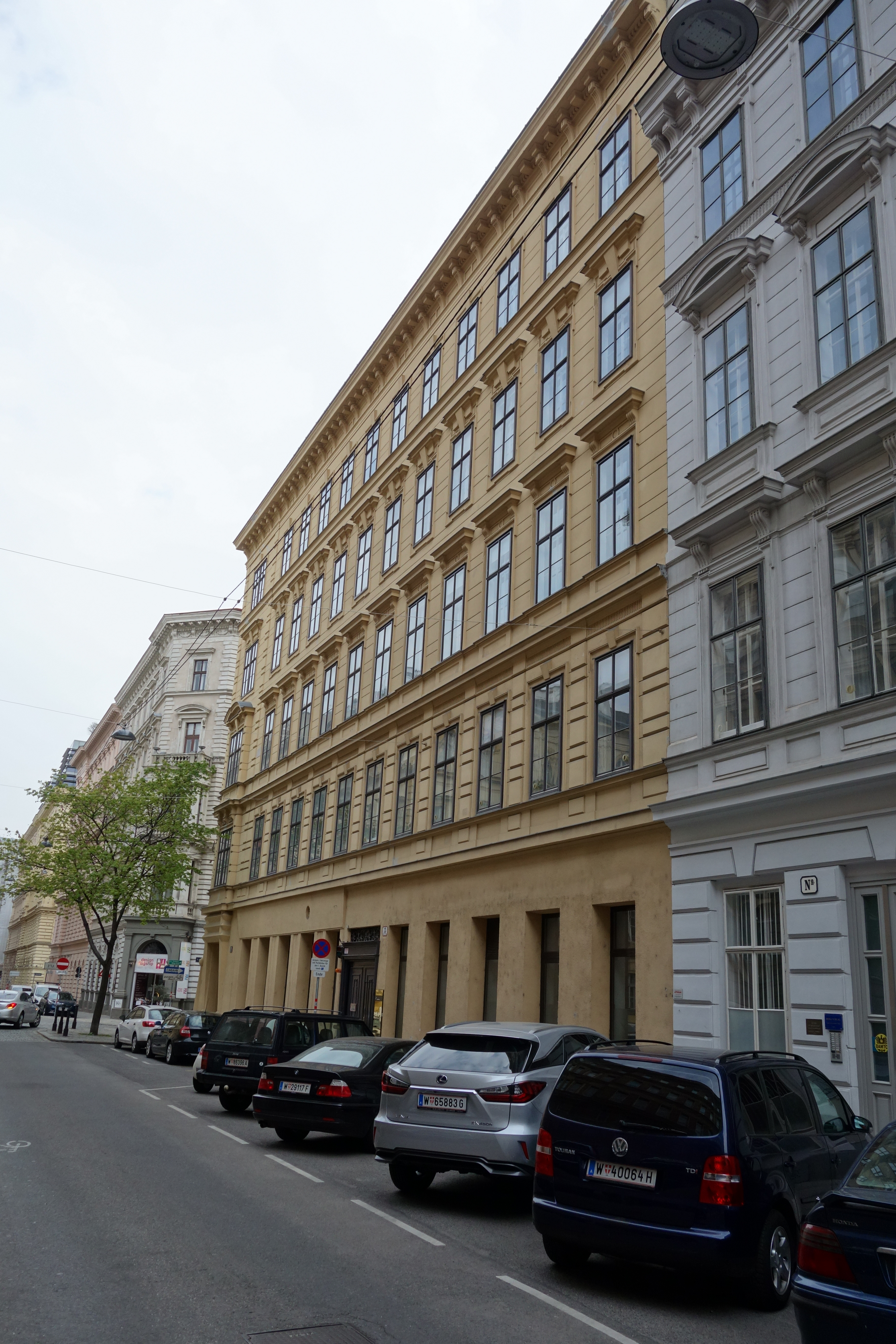
Ferrosilicon Company (Hegelgasse 13)

==== Imperial Austrian-Hungarian ====
- Central Warehouse of Austrian & Hungarian String Factories, registered cooperative, Maximilianplatz 2, Vienna (later: Freiheitsplatz or Rooseveltplatz 2).
- Procurement Cooperative of Austrian-Hungarian Power Plants, Mariannengasse 4 (at that time located in the administration building of the Vienna Public Utility and Power Plant, Mariannengasse 4–6)
- Procurement, Sales- & Credit Cooperative of Austrian & Hungarian Shoe Factories, Mariahilferstr. 17 (large building consisting of several business premises; shops in the basement, offices upstairs)
- Central-Sales Bureau of the United Austrian-Hungarian Knitting Yarn Spinning Mills, Lindengasse 41, Vienna
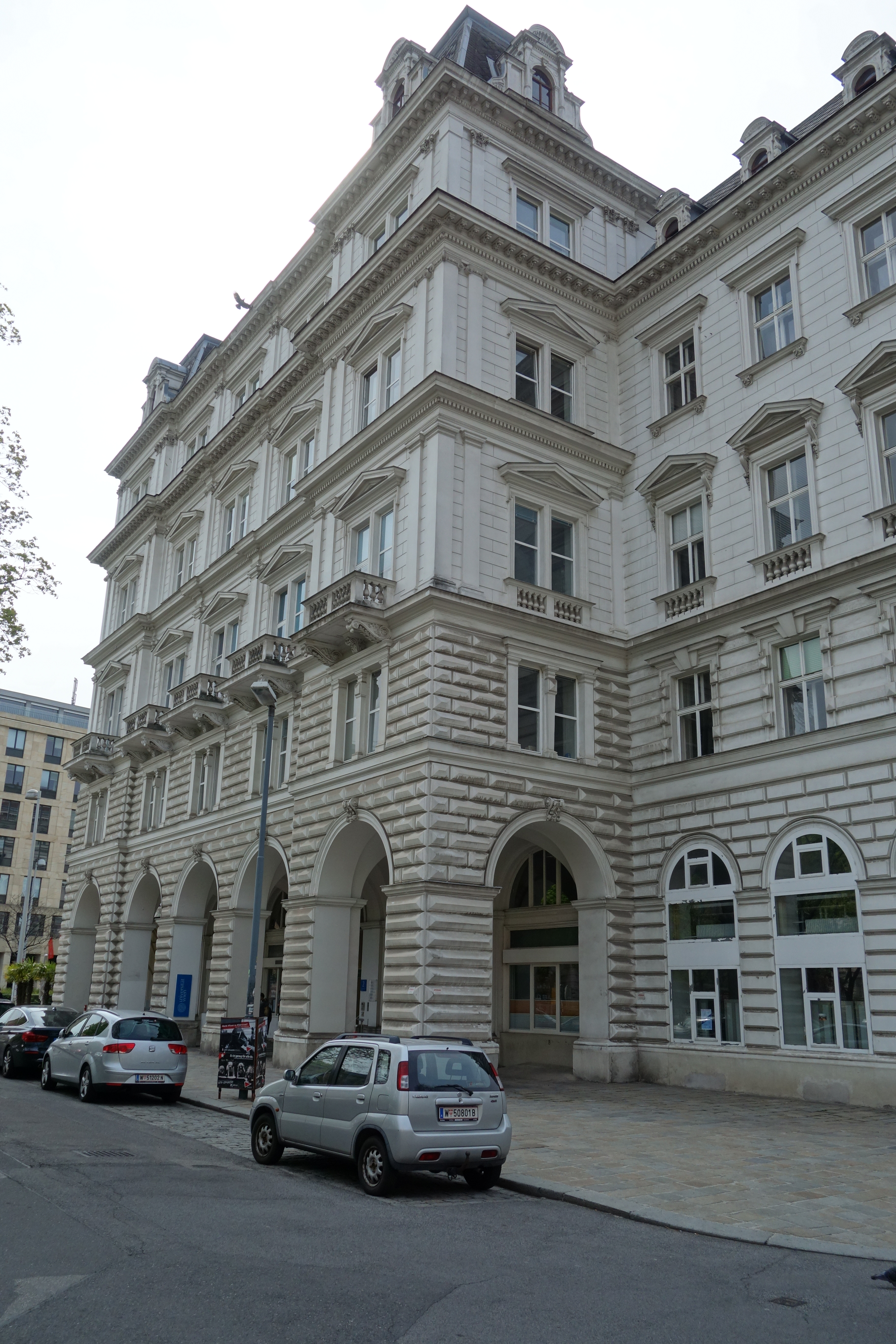
Central Warehouse of Austrian & Hungarian String Factories (Maximilianplatz 2 [today: Rooseveltplatz 2])

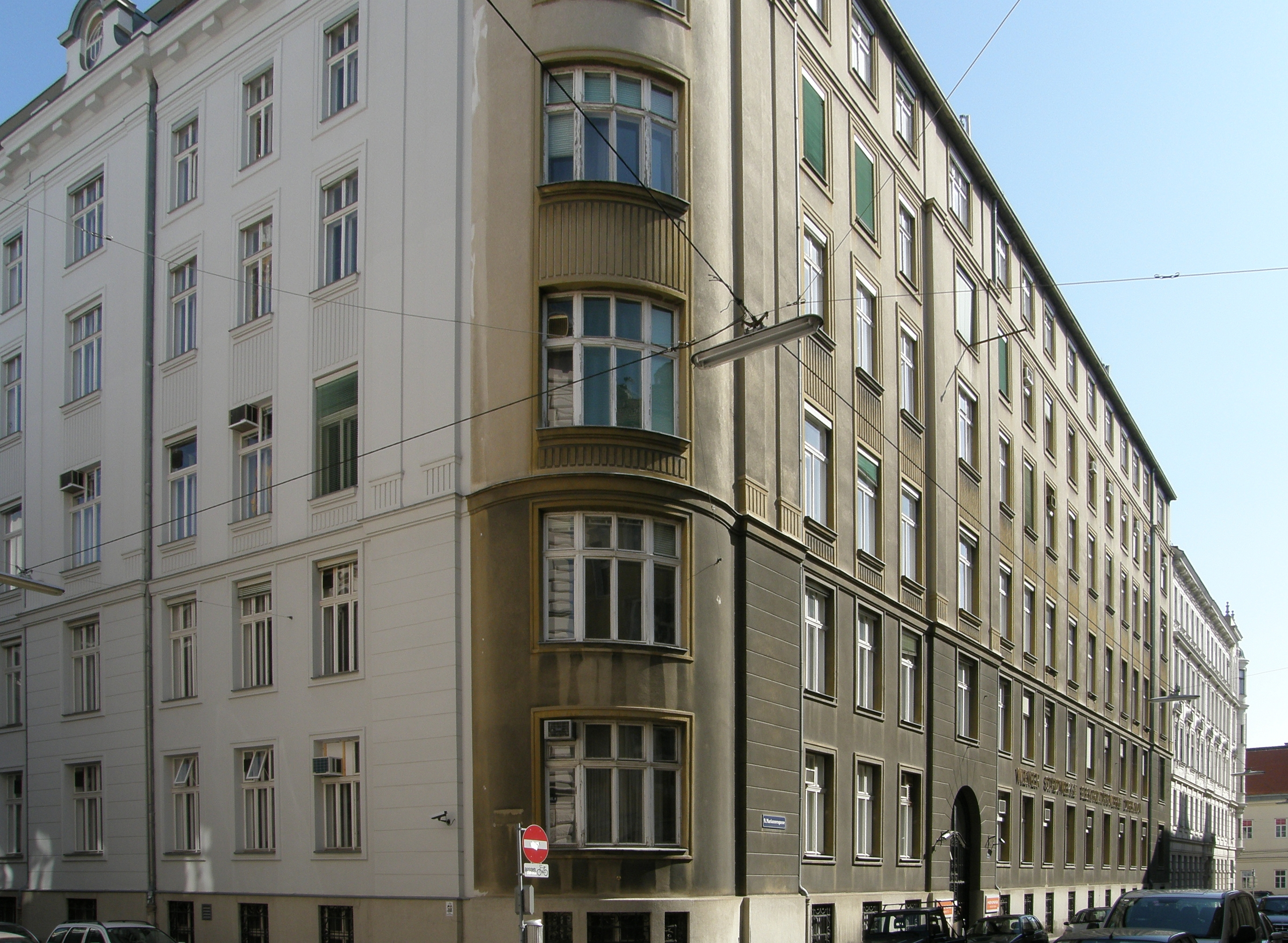
Procurement Cooperative of Austrian-Hungarian Power Plants (Mariannengasse 4)

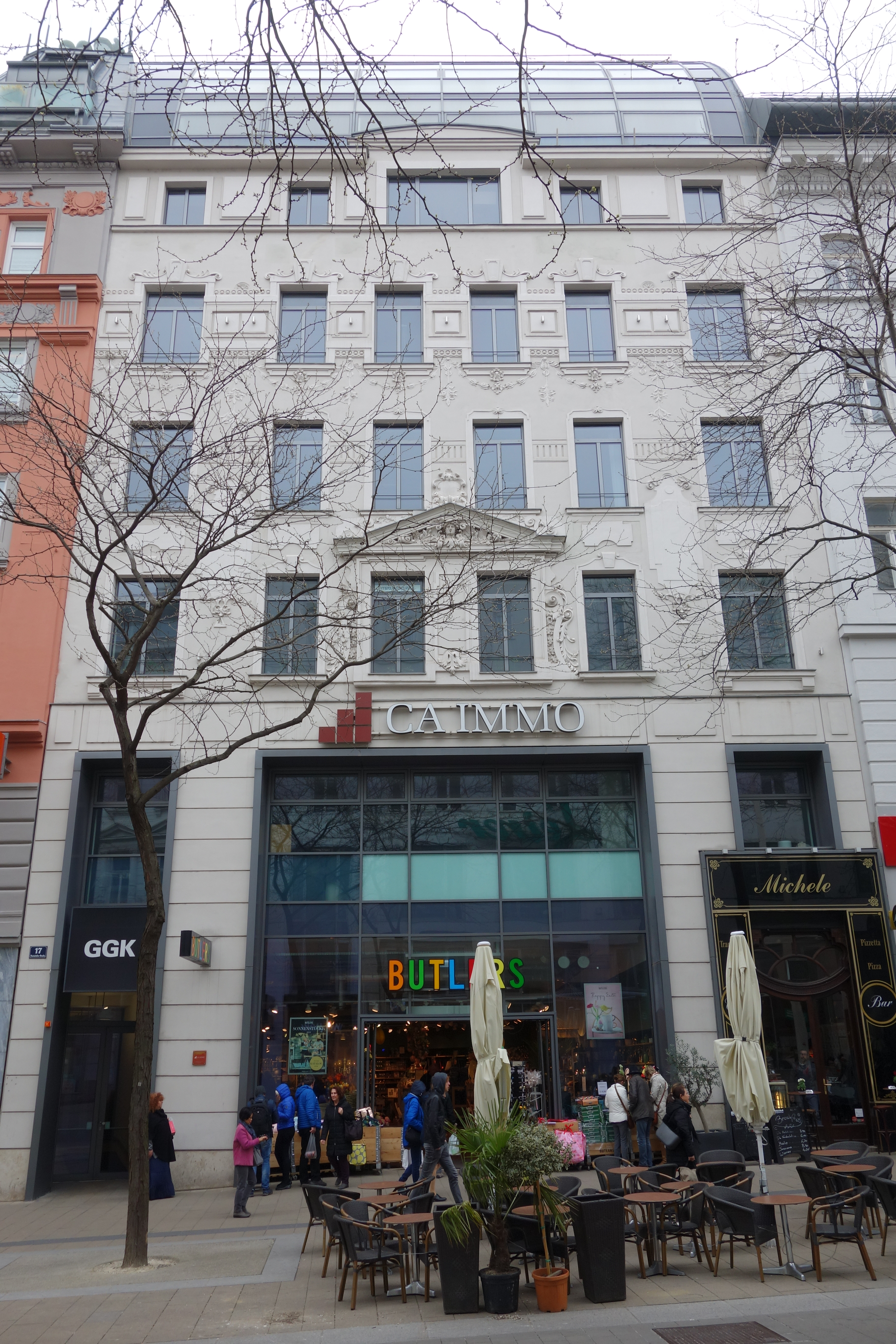
Procurement, Sales- & Credit Cooperative of Austrian & Hungarian Shoe Factories (Mariahilferstr. 17)

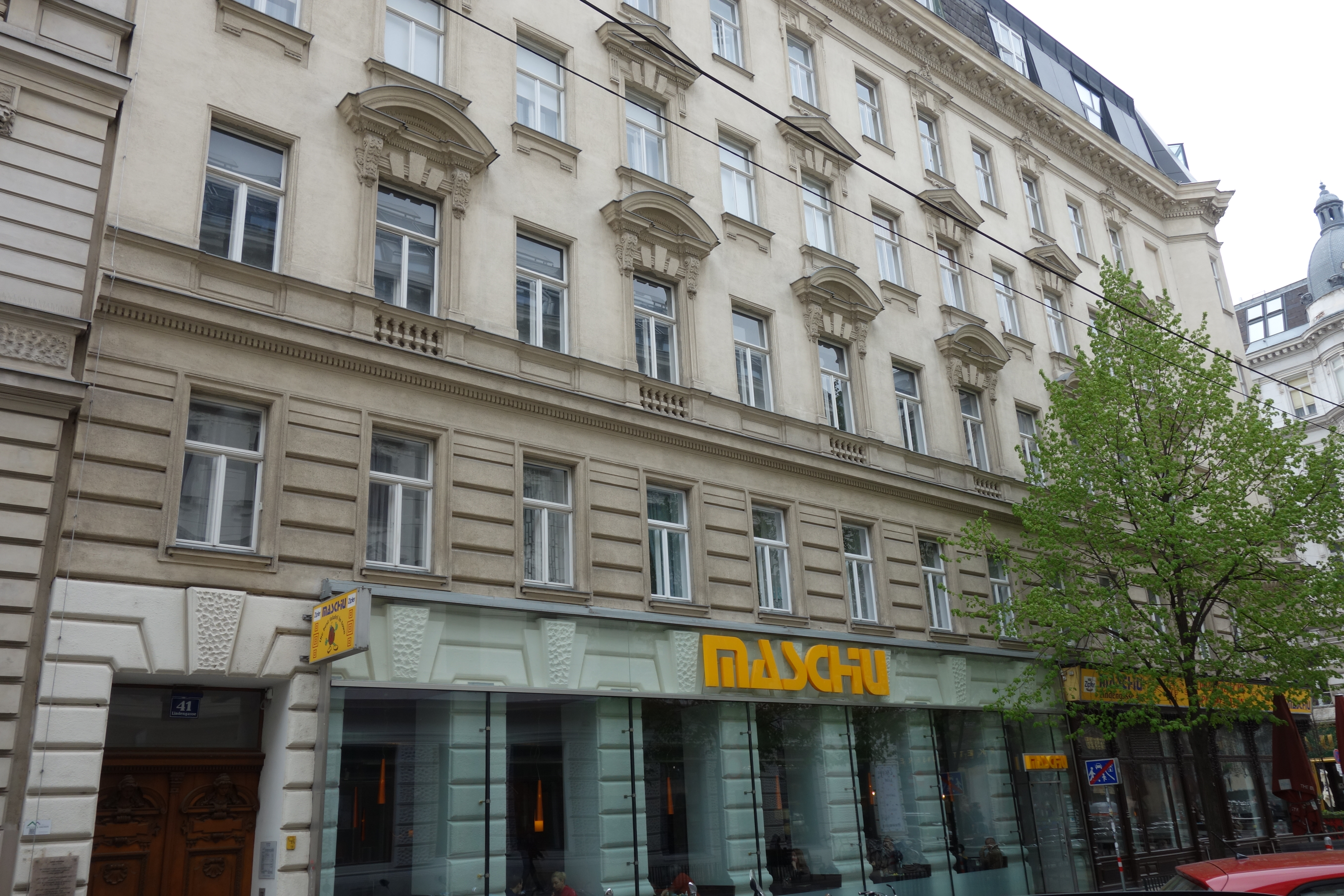
Central-Sales Bureau of the United Austrian-Hungarian Knitting Yarn Spinning Mills (Lindengasse 41)

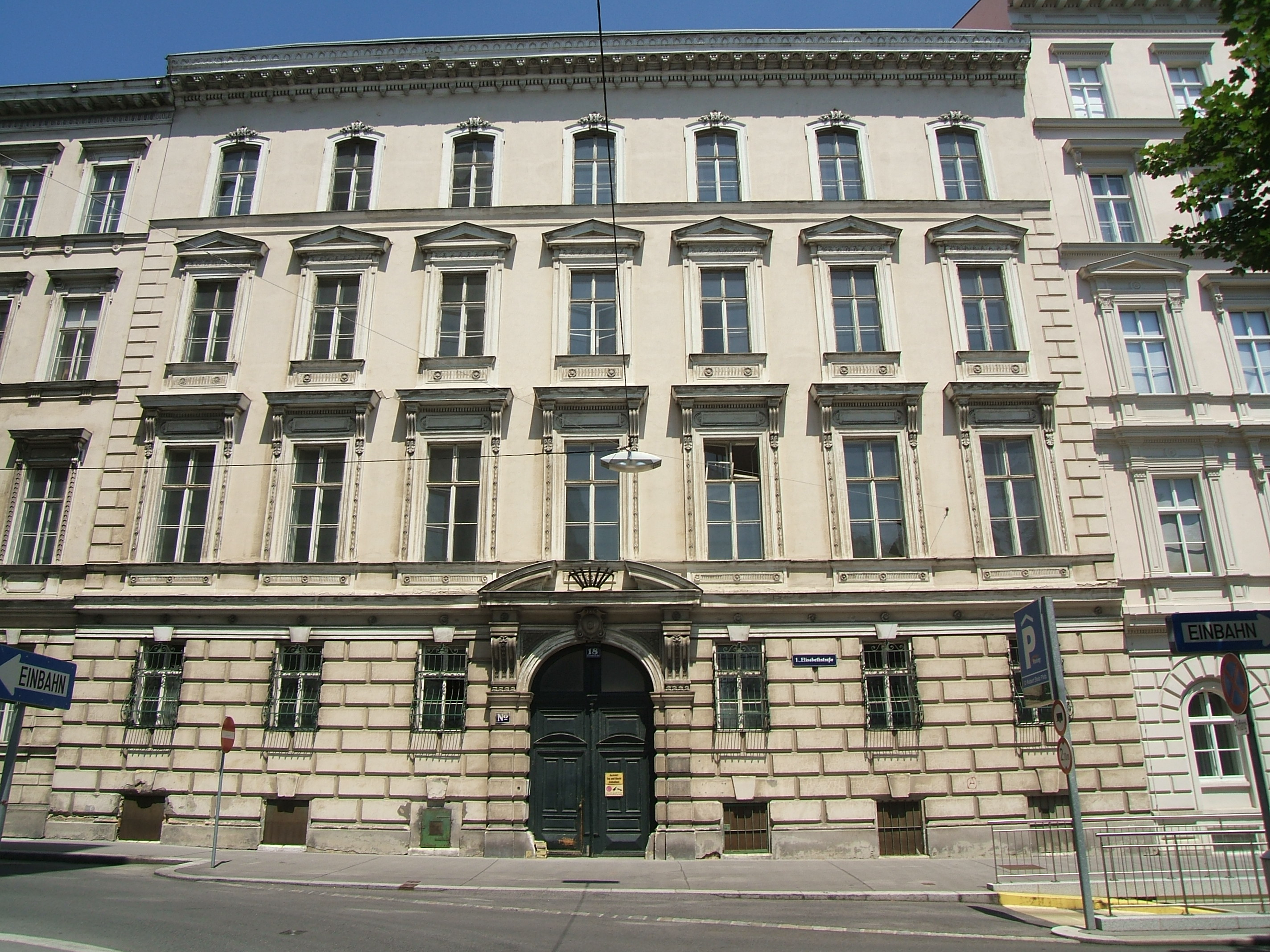
Cooperative of the Austrian Sugar Refineries (Palais Mayr, Elisabethstr 18)

==== Cisleithanian ====
- Cooperative of the Austrian Sugar Refineries (original name stated in German, Czech and Polish), established in 1896, Elisabethstr. 18. Building erected in 1862 as Palais Mayr.

==== Austrian (crownland or republic) ====
- Main Sales Point of the Austrian Cement-Factories: Ditscheinergasse 2 (Landstraße district)
- Cement Sales Agency Ostmark, Seilerstätte 13, Vienna (Inner City)
- Procurement Cooperative of the Austrian Power Plant Association, Schleifmühlengasse 4
- Procurement Cooperative of the Association of Austrian Local Trains, Schleifmühlengasse 4
- Sales Office of the Austrian Gypsum Works, Rudolf von Alt-Platz 7, Vienna (East Vienna)
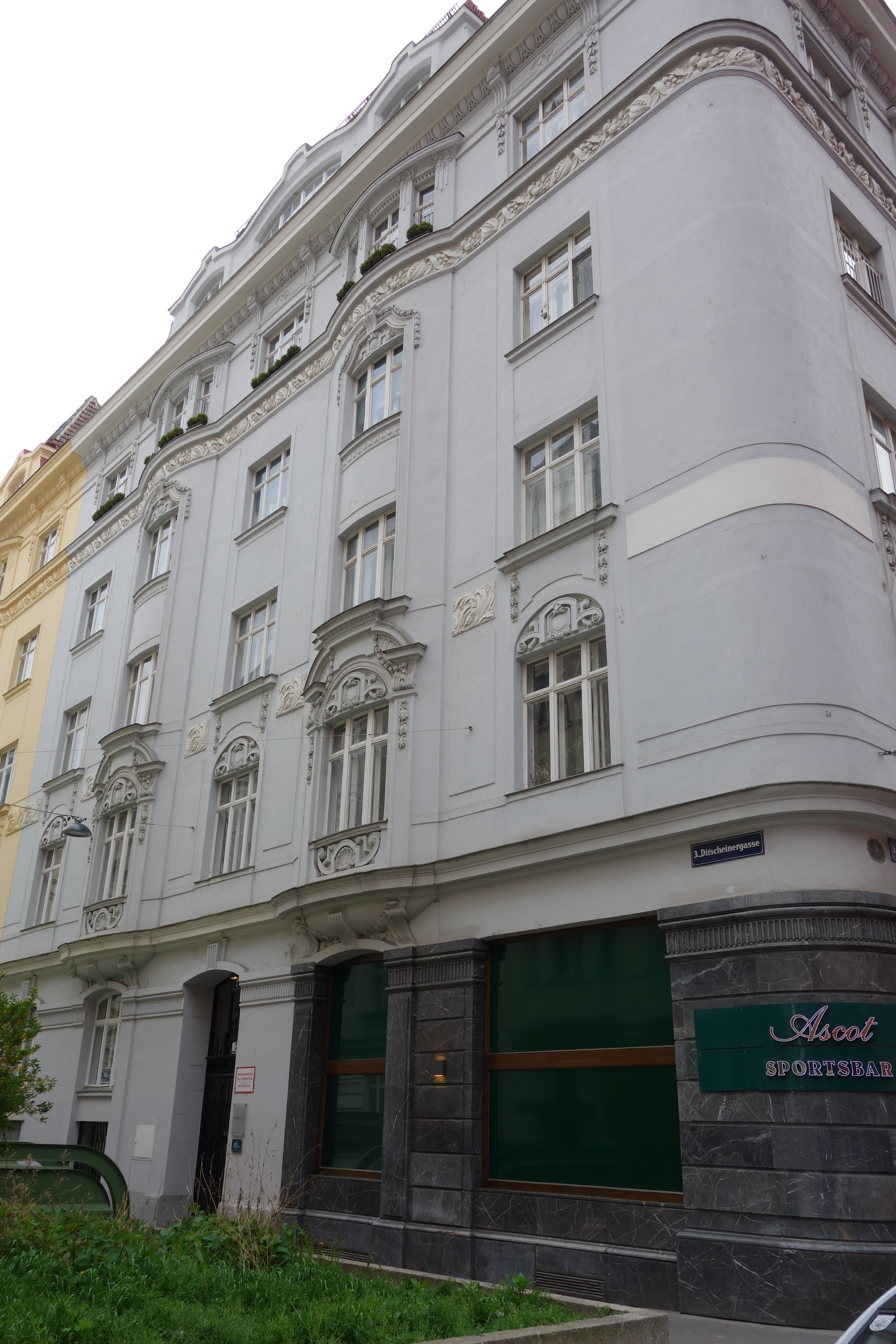
Main Sales Point of the Austrian Cement Factories (Ditscheinergasse 2)

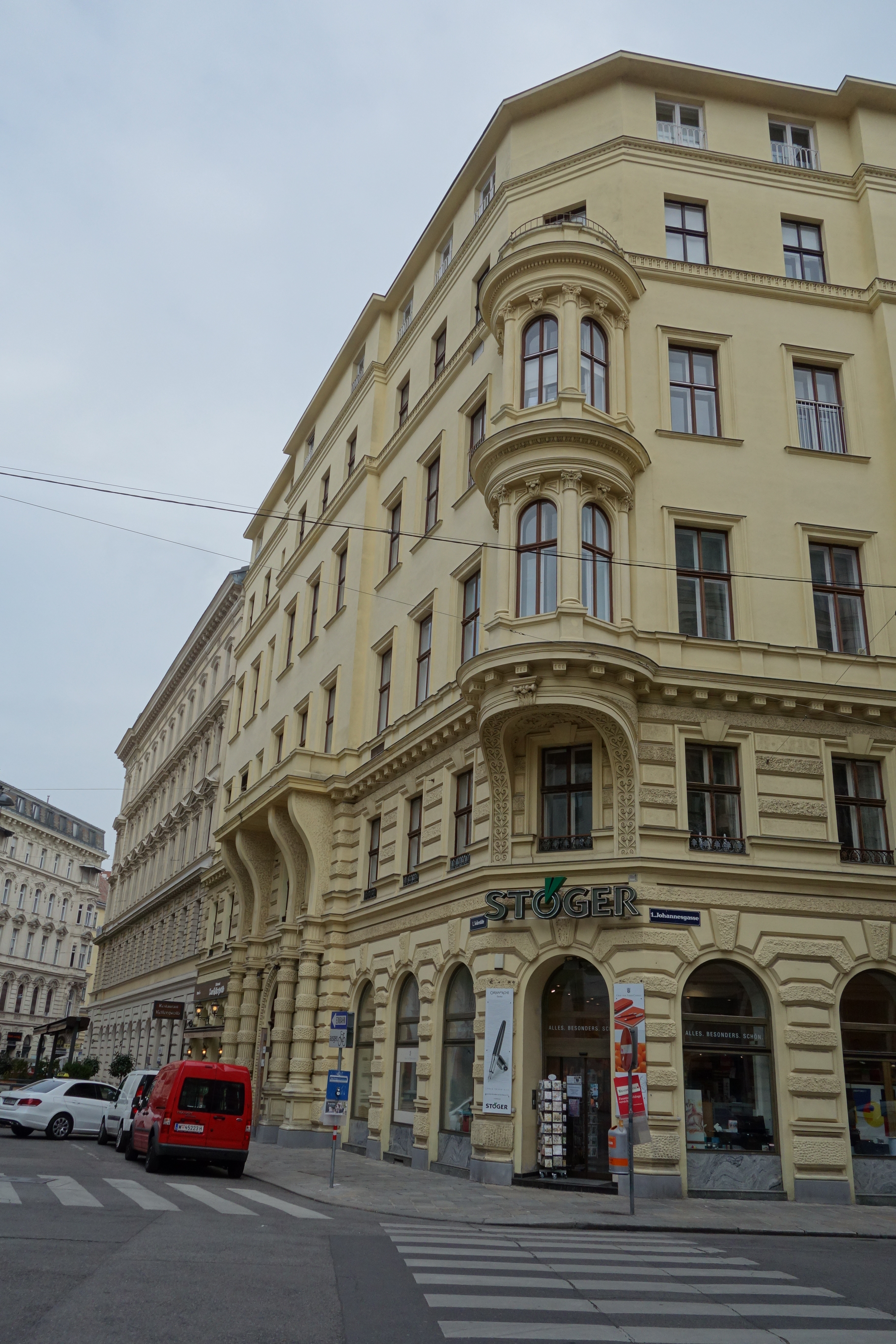
Cement Sales Agency Ostmark (Seilerstätte 13)

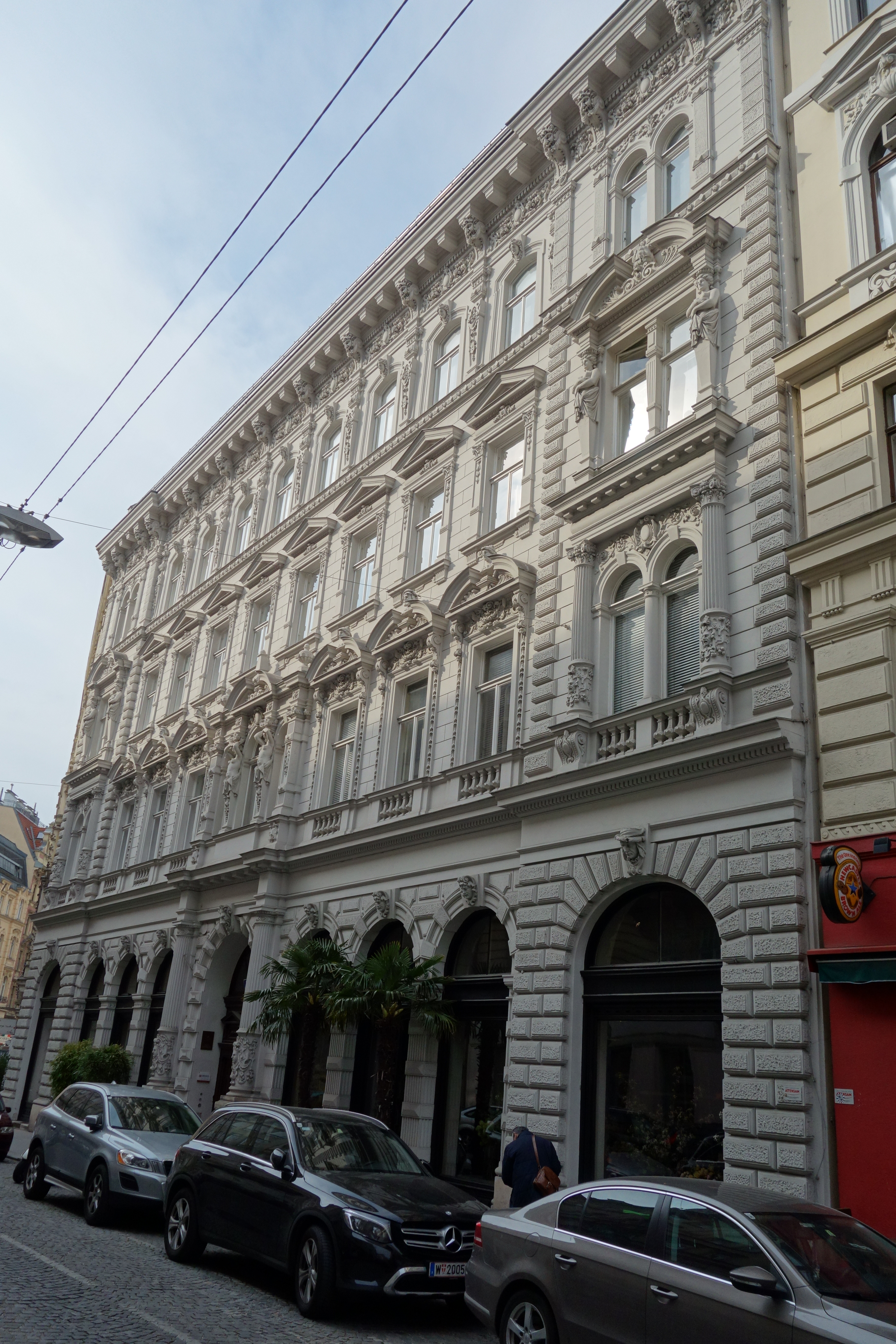
Procurement Cooperative of the Association of Local Austrian Trains (Schleifmühlengasse 4)

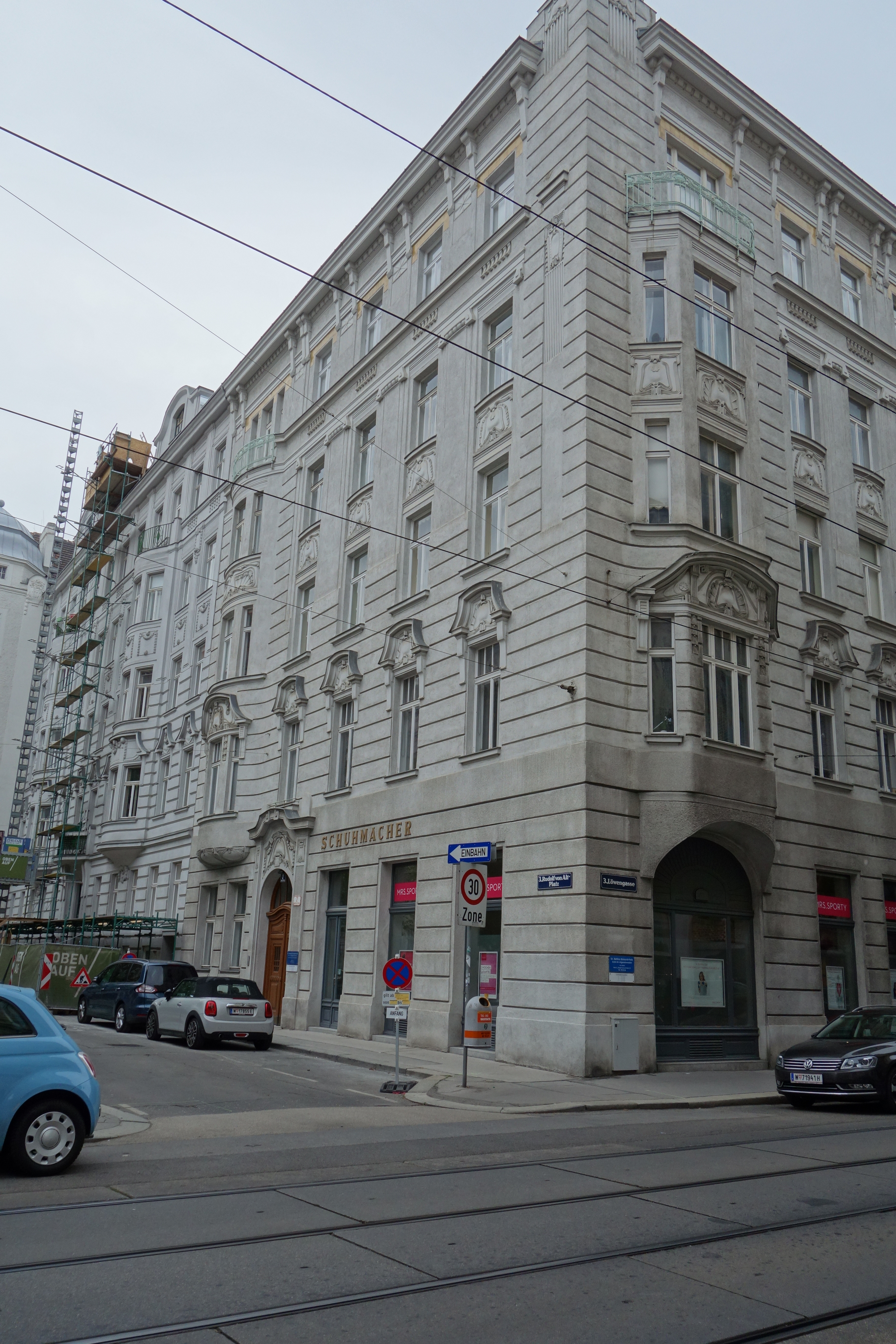
Sales Office of the Austrian Gypsum Works (Rudolf von Alt-Platz 7)

==== Lower Austrian ====
- Sales Cooperative of the Lower Austrian Lime Works, Plankengasse 6, Vienna (Vienna-Inner City)
- Sales Bureau of Lower Austrian Forrest Owners, Schauflergasse 6, Vienna (Vienna-Inner City)
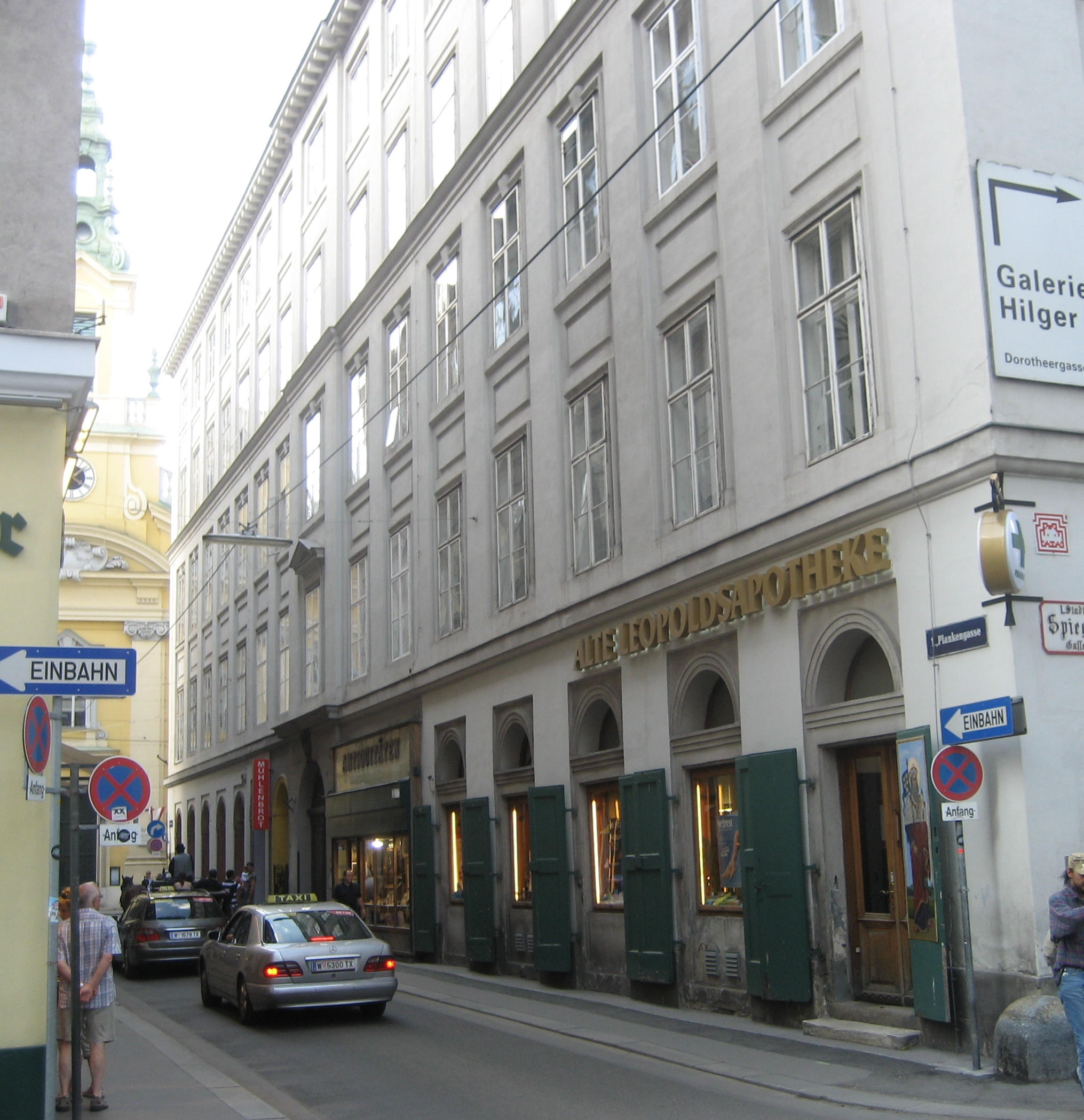
Sales Cooperative of the Lower Austrian Lime Works (Plankengasse 6)

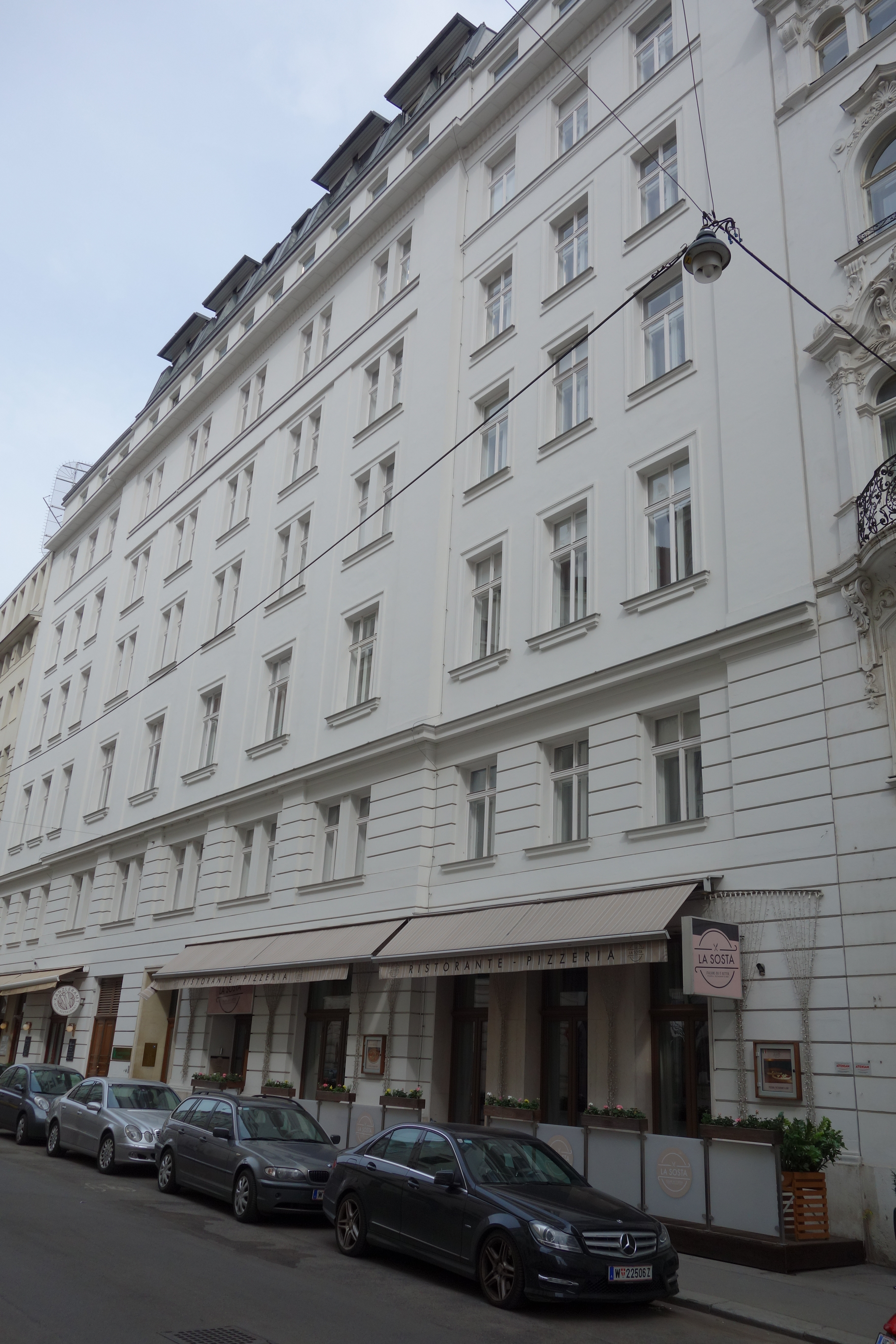
Sales Office of Lower Austrian Forest Owners (Schauflergasse 6)

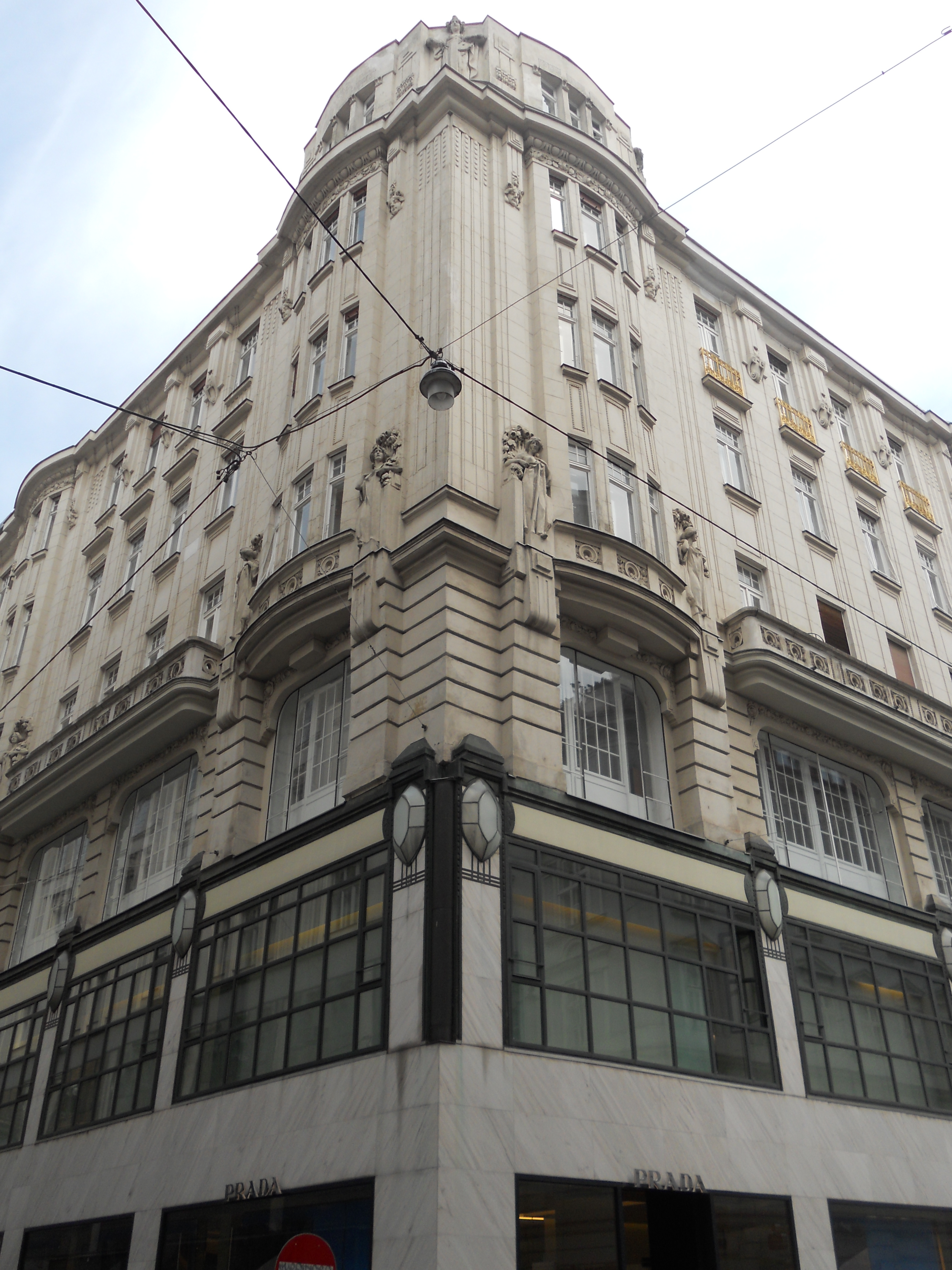
United Sole and Strap Leather Factories (Vienna, Liliengasse 3)

==== Urban Viennese ====
- Procurement, Sales- & Credit Cooperative of the United Sole and Strap Leather Factories in Vienna, Weihburggasse 9 (corner house together with Liliengasse 3, with separate entrances from each street).
- Central Business Cooperative of the Master Shoemakers in Vienna. Kirchengasse 32 (crossroad to Mariahilferstr.).
- Central Procurement Cooperative of the Austrian Hairdressers and Hairdresser Cooperatives in Vienna, Mollardgasse 1. The building belongs since 1910 to the Viennese Hairdresser guilt.

=== Belgium ===
- Brussels: the building of the International Wire Export Company (IWECO) from 1932 to 1939, 54 rue de Namur. In this world cartel for wire exports, Belgium, France, Germany, Czechoslovakia, Hungary and Poland were regular members. The United States, United Kingdom, Denmark, the Netherlands and Italy were affiliated to the cartel through individual agreements.
- Brussels: the building of the Convention internationale des glaceries, an association of European plate glass producers between 1904 and 1914/15.

=== Czechia ===
Also in Czechoslovakia, the capital (Prague) was the most favored location for cartel headquarters. Nevertheless, other places can be found (e.g. Brno), but were comparably rare.

- Brno, Jesuitengasse 6 (now: Jezuitská 4): the building of the „Čechoslovak Cloth Association" from October 4, 1921. The underlying agreement intended the unification of the payment and delivery conditions. Almost all important firms of the Czechoslovak cloth industry were affiliated. Besides the cloth industry in the narrow sense, there were plush, felt and other specialities. The control of the conditions was to the duty of the participating six subgroups of the cartel. The conditions of sale were fixed by each group autonomously.
- Prague, Na Poříčí 26: the building of the Czechoslovak "Spiritusverwertungsgesellschaft G.m.b.H.". In this sales organization, the Czechoslovak or respectively the Bohemian-Moravian spirit distillers had been united since 1923 and up to the mid-1940s years.
- Prague, Opletalova 55, formerly: Lüzowova 55: the building of the Czechoslovak Steel Syndicate, 192? -1939. In that organization the Czechoslovak iron and steel producers were united. The syndicate was an associate member of the International Steel Cartel between 1927 and 1931 and its reestablishment from 1933 to 1939.
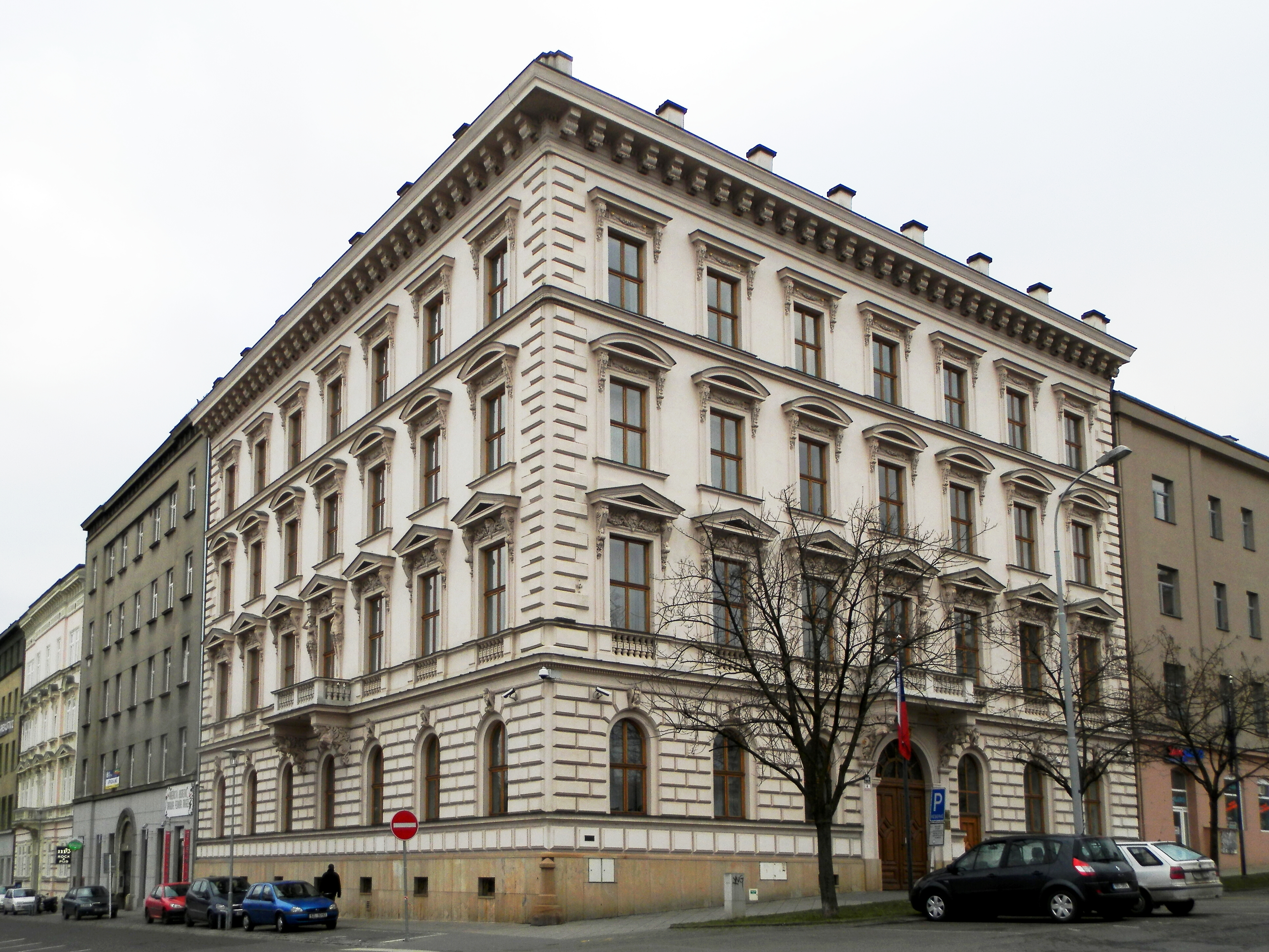
Čechoslovak Cloth Association (Brno, Jesuitengasse 6, now Jezuitská 4.

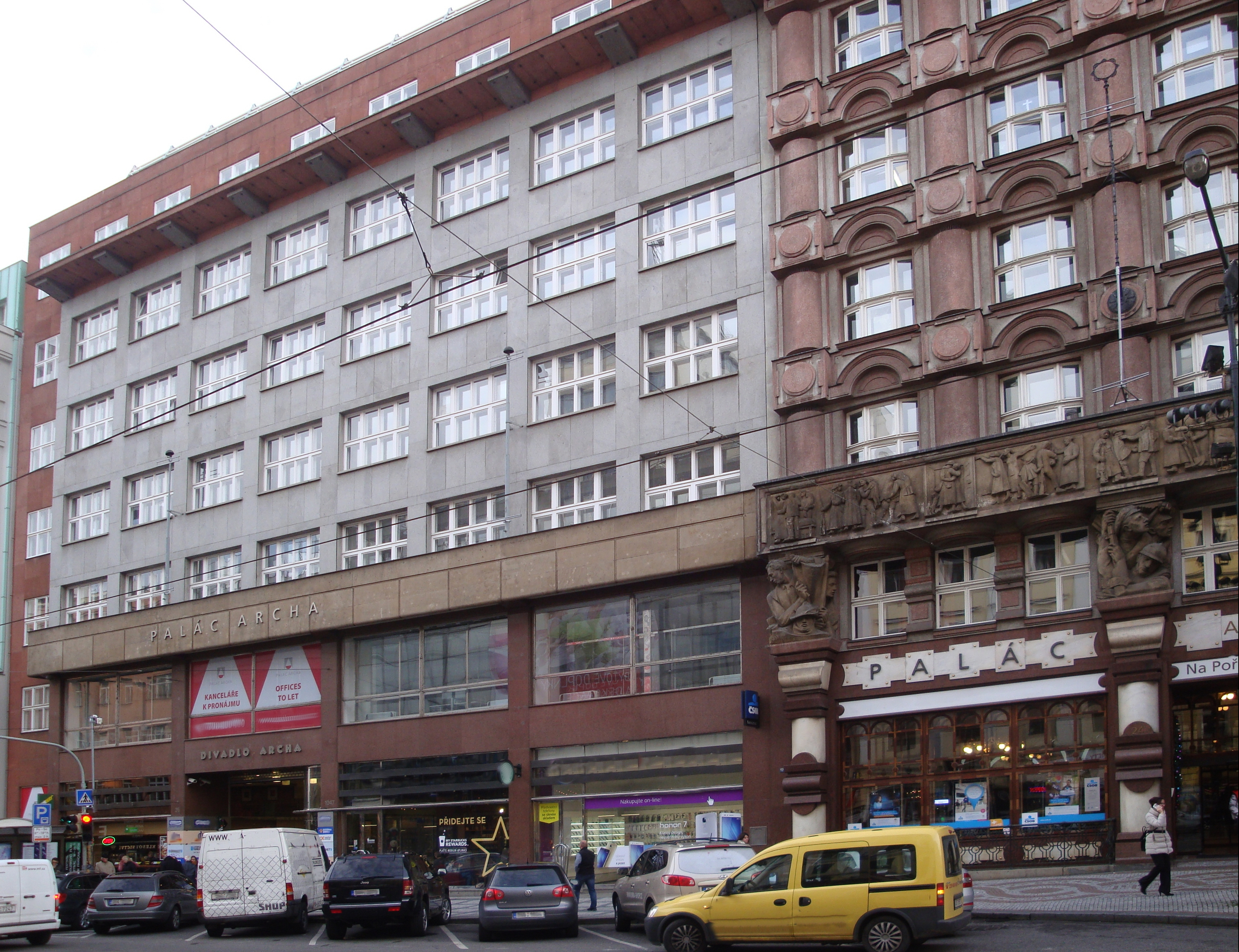
Spirit Distillers Company (Prague, Na Poříčí 26, left building)

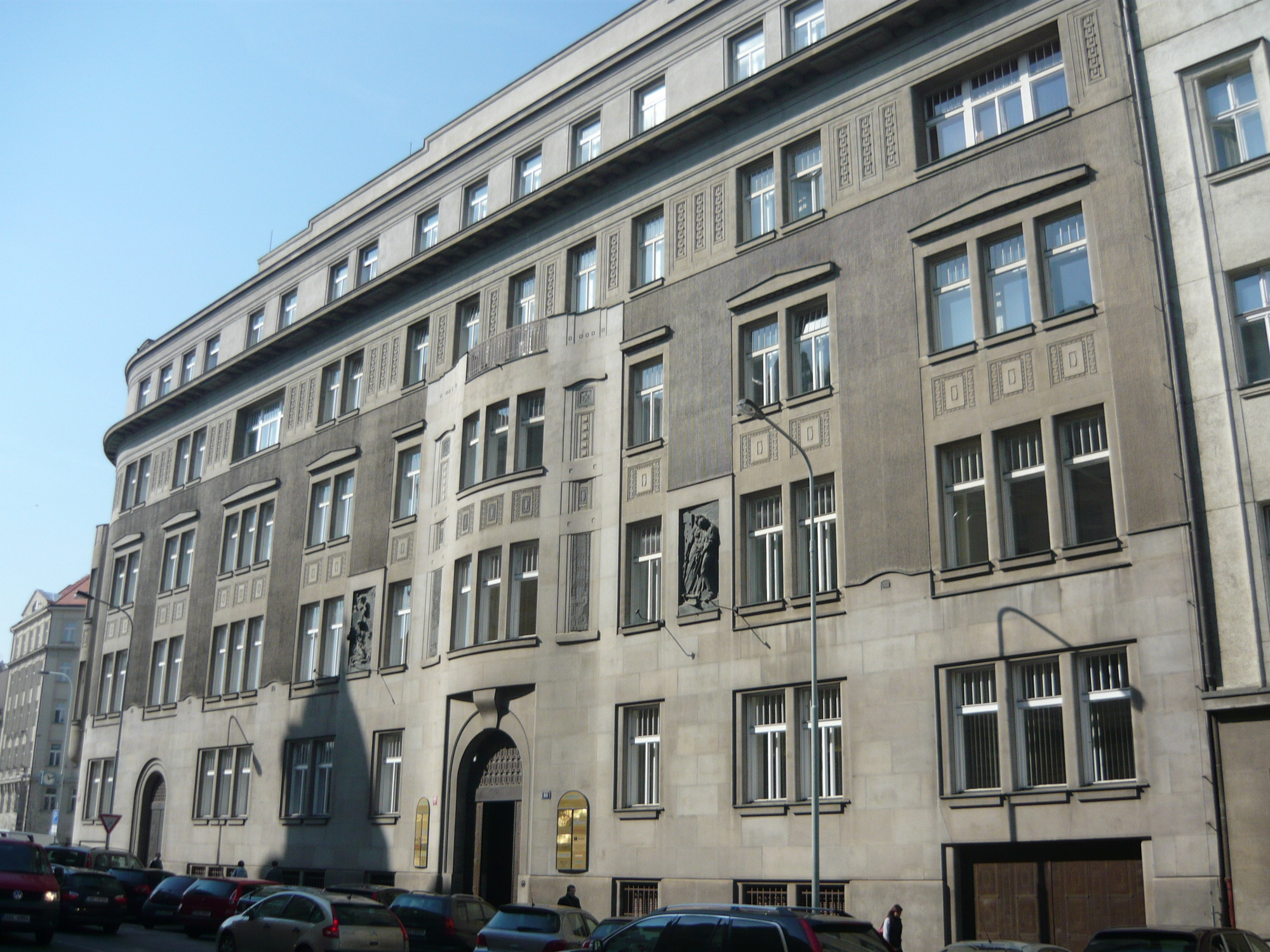
Czechoslovak Steel Syndicate (Prague, Opletalova 55, formerly: Lüzowova 55)

=== France ===
- Longwy/Lothringen: the building of the Comptoir métallurgique de Longwy, 1876–1914, Member firms: pig iron smelters of French Lorraine. Significance: in the 19th century (until the First World War) most famous and by turnover strongest sales cartel in France. Building: reused, without monument protection.
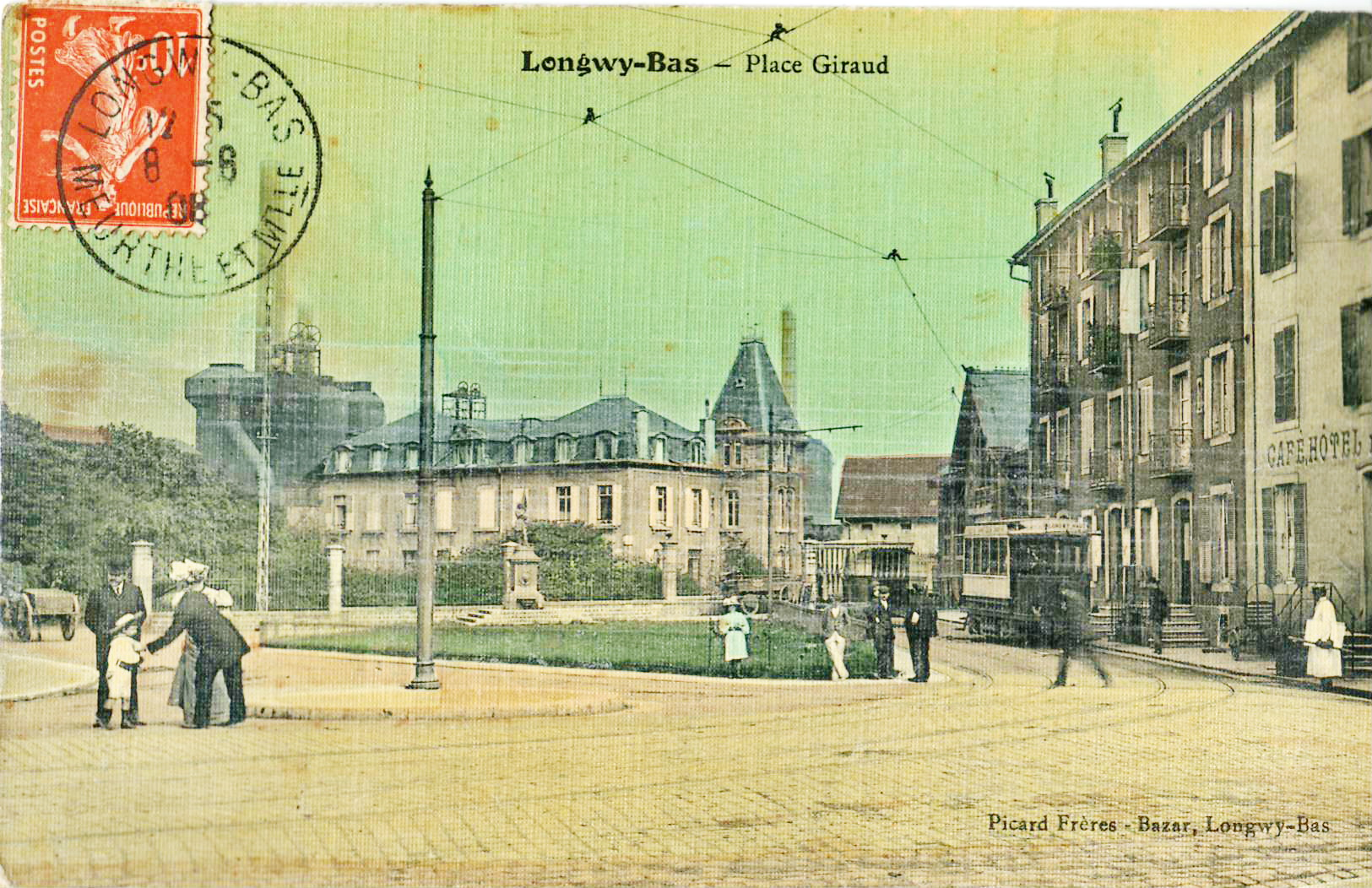
Comptoir building in the center of Place Giraud. Longwy Bas, pre-1914

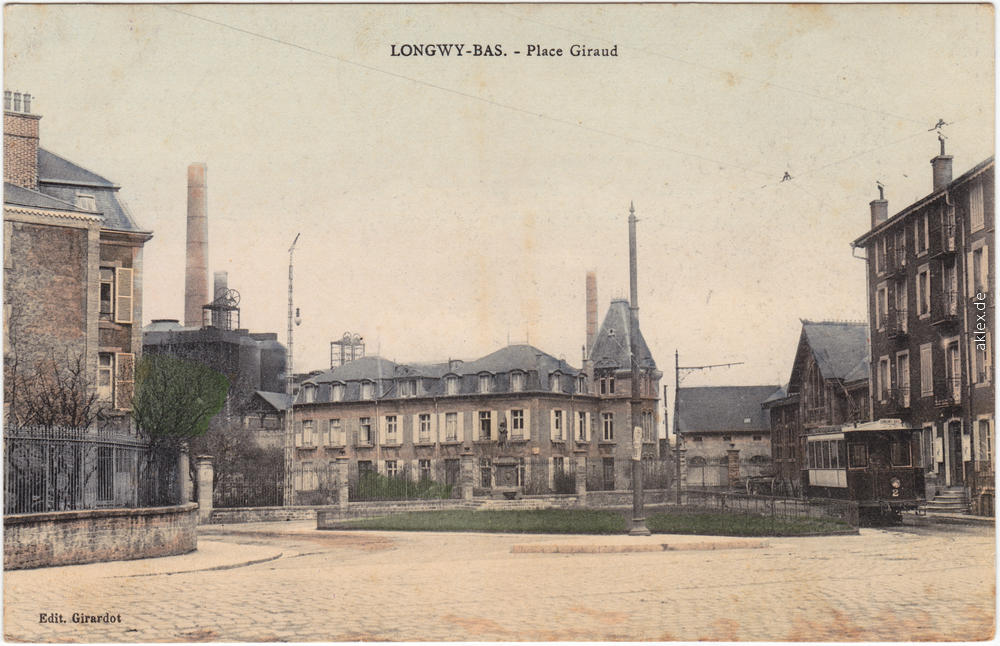
Comptoir building in the center of Place Giraud. Longwy Bas, pre-1914

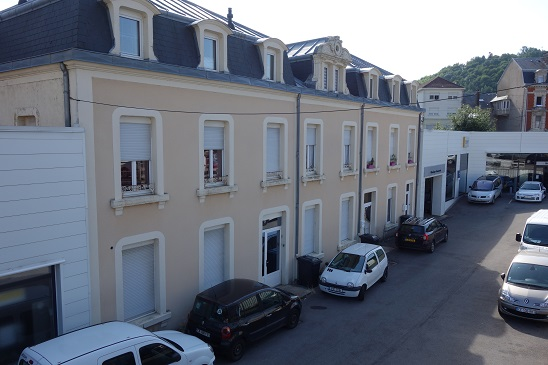
Former Comptoir building from the frontside left, 2017

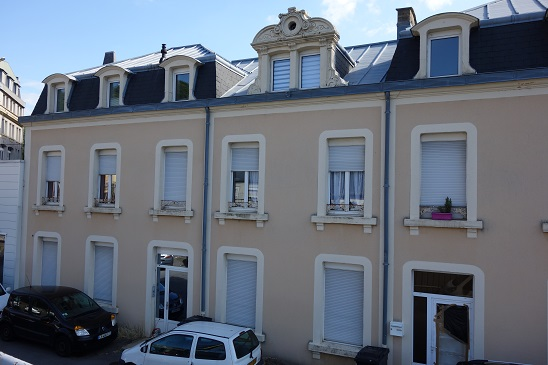
Former Comptoir building from the frontside right, 2017

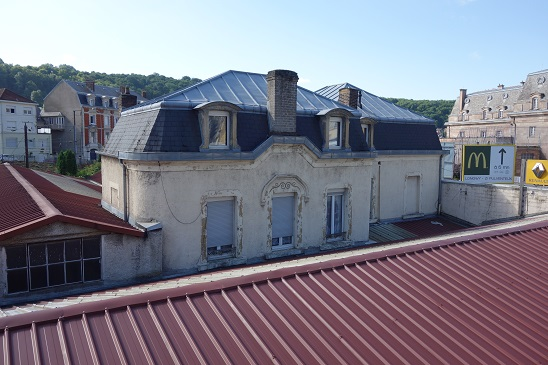
Former Comptoir building from the backside, 2017

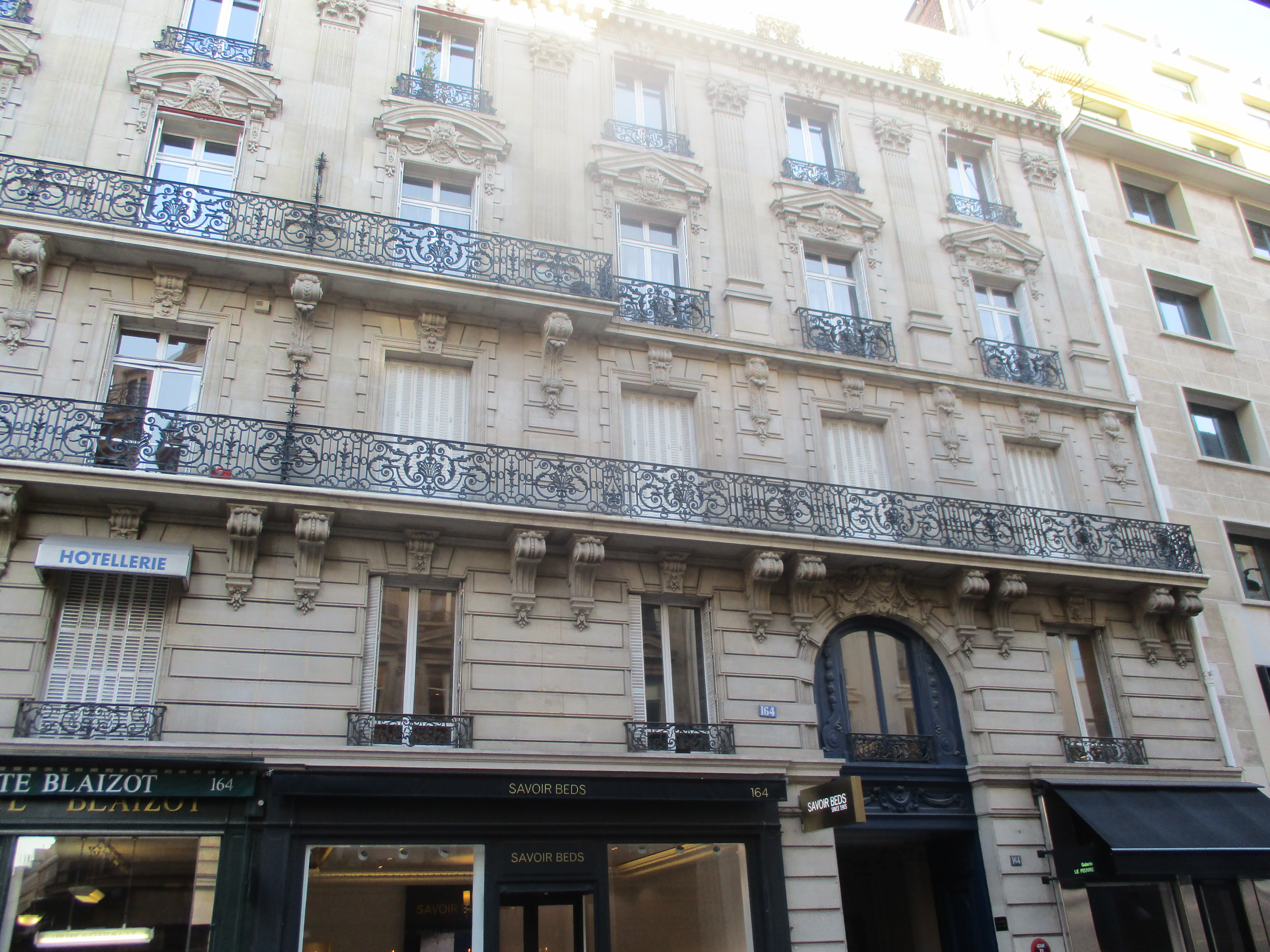
Former Comptoir Siderurgique de France
- Paris, rue du Faubourg 164: the first building of the Comptoir Siderurgique de France, moved in by 1919. This association was the French national steel cartel. The Comptoir was privileged founding member of the International steel cartel between 1926 and 1931.
- Paris, rue Paul-Cézanne 1: the second building of the Comptoir Siderurgique de France, documented for 1938. The Comptoir was privileged founding member of the International steel cartel between 1933 and 1939.
- Paris, Rue de la Chaussée-d'Antin: the building, wherein the „Aluminium Association" (AA) resided between 1912 and 1914. The AA was a European quota and price cartel, which did not sell directly, but registered the aluminium sales of the national groups.
- Paris, 23 rue Balzac, the former building of the Pechiney corporation which housed the national French aluminium cartel during the inter-war period. The premised were replaced by a new building in the 1980s.

=== Germany ===
- the Ruhr cartel cluster in Northwest Germany: Since the end of the 19th century, the extended Ruhr region (including the northern Rhineland and neighboring low mountain ranges) was the area with the world's most intense cartelization. Cartels in coal mining, in iron smelting and steel refining, and further processing industries were typical of the region. In addition, there were cooperative producer associations in numerous other branches of industry such as glassmaking, pulp production, etc. Alone in the iron and steel industry at the beginning of the 20th century there were 13 cartels or cartel establishments in Düsseldorf; in Hagen there were even more: 15, in Cologne 8, in Essen, Siegen, Solingen and Velbert 2 each. Proof of the diverse cooperation structures in and between cartels could provide a more accurate topography of the earlier cartel economy on the Rhine and Ruhr.
- the Berlin cartel cluster: As early as the beginning of the 20th century, Berlin was a sought-after location for cartel headquarters or selling agencies. In the iron and steel industry alone, 9 cartels were established in Berlin at the beginning of the 20th century. – and this, although Berlin was not a location of coal and steel production. Since the First World War, more and more cartel functions were exercised throughout the German empire. In Berlin during the inter-war period and the Second World War, there was a veritable agglomeration of cartel seats, later of economic control agencies ("Reichsstellen"). These centers were networked into the rest of the Reich territory and increasingly also with government and politics. Due to its convenient situation, the surroundings of the Anhalter Bahnhof (a railway station) were particularly popular for nationwide organized sales cartels. Already before the First World War, they started to take residence there. For example, the Anhalter Bahnhof was within walking distance of a number of important headquarters (such as of the salt industries). Other cartel districts existed near the political offices Wilhelmstraße (Berlin-Mitte) and Friedrichstrasse. Later settlements of the economic control agencies ("Reichsstellen") from the 1930s to the early 1940s favored the bourgeois districts in West Berlin, e.g. Berlin-Charlottenburg and Berlin-Wilmersdorf.
- the buildings of the Rhenish-Westphalian Coal Syndicate and its successor organizations, Essen. Importance: the essential fuel supplier for Germany until the 1960s, the strategic supplier in Western Europe for coke needed for steel processing, the main fuel supplier for the Central and Axis powers in the world wars. There were two buildings: the original Syndicate building (1894–1943) and the “Ruhrkohlehaus” (Ruhr coal house) from 1952 onwards. The first one was bombed in 1943 (except for one wing), the latter demolished in 1997. In the street scene of Essen nothing reminds (no plaque) of the former „the model German cartel“ or „ideal cartel of the world", thus an organizational celebrity.
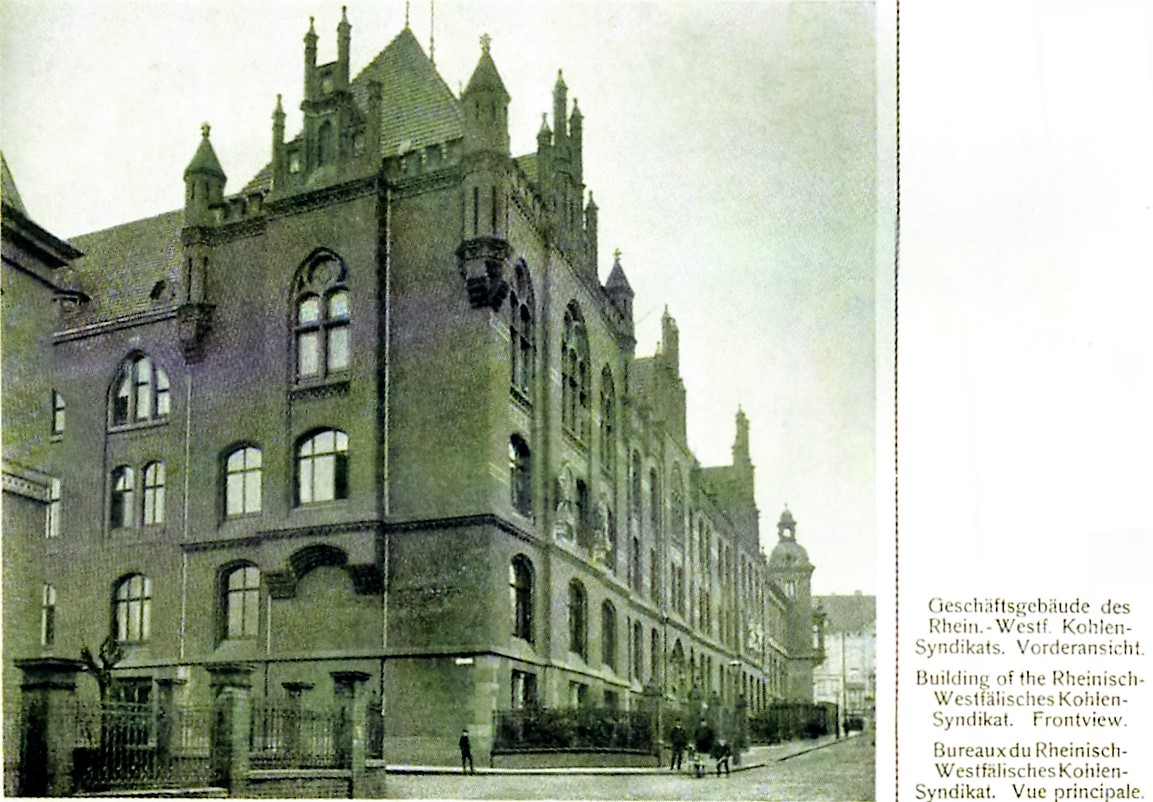
Headquarters of the Rhenish-Westphalian Coal Syndicate, around 1900

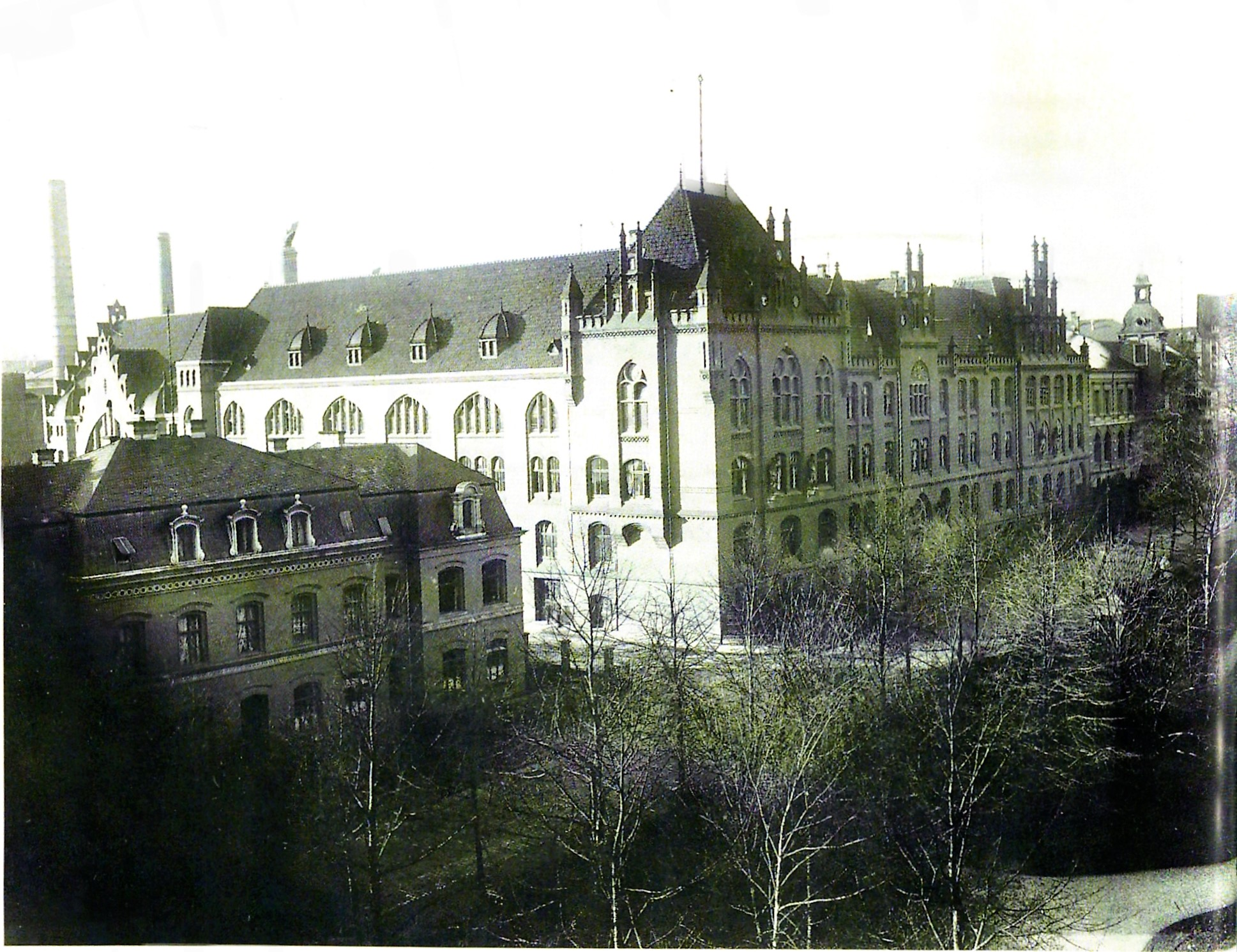
Headquarters of the Rhenish-Westphalian Coal Syndicate, around 1910

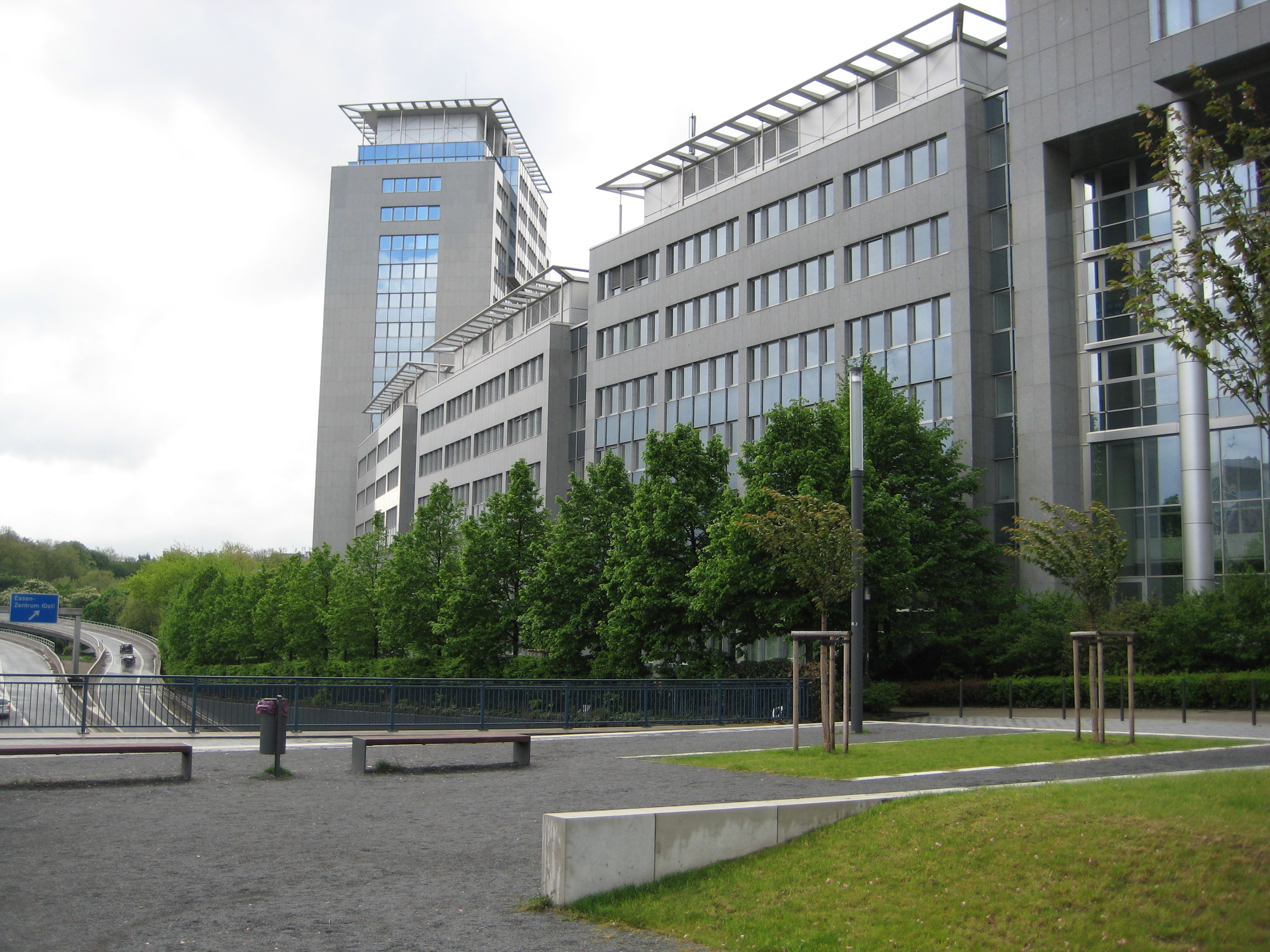
Here stood the buildings of the coal syndicate and up to 1997 the "Ruhrkohlehaus" (now: headquarters of the Evonik Corporation)
- the “Stahlhof”, Düsseldorf, since 1908 the headquarters of the Stahlwerksverband, the German steel cartel. Members: Steel works of the Ruhr, since 1909 steel works nationwide. The building is listed only because of its architecture and as the "cradle of democracy in North Rhine-Westphalia" (seat of the British military government). No commemorative plaque because of its origin as the largest steel cartel worldwide.

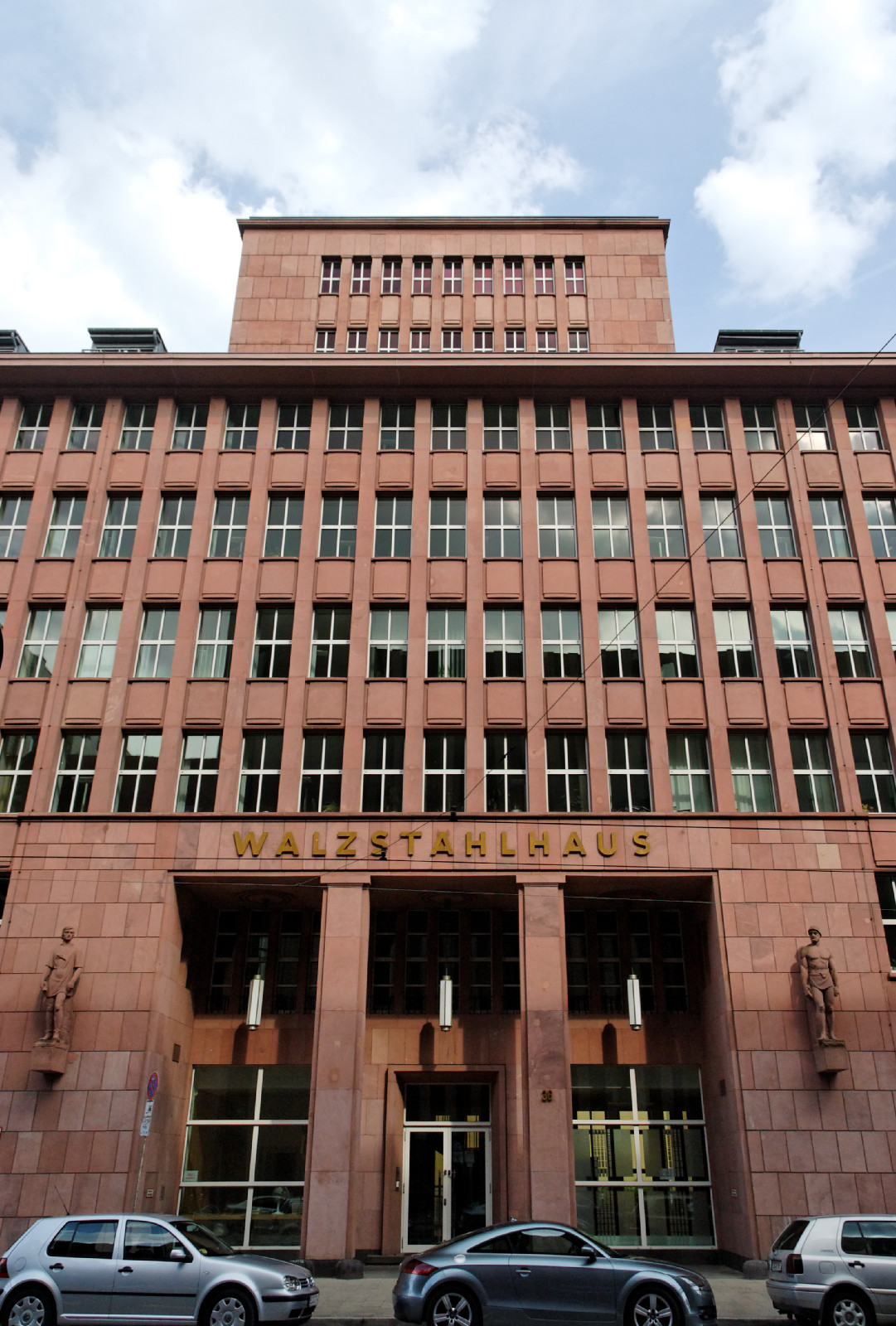
Rolled Steel House, portal

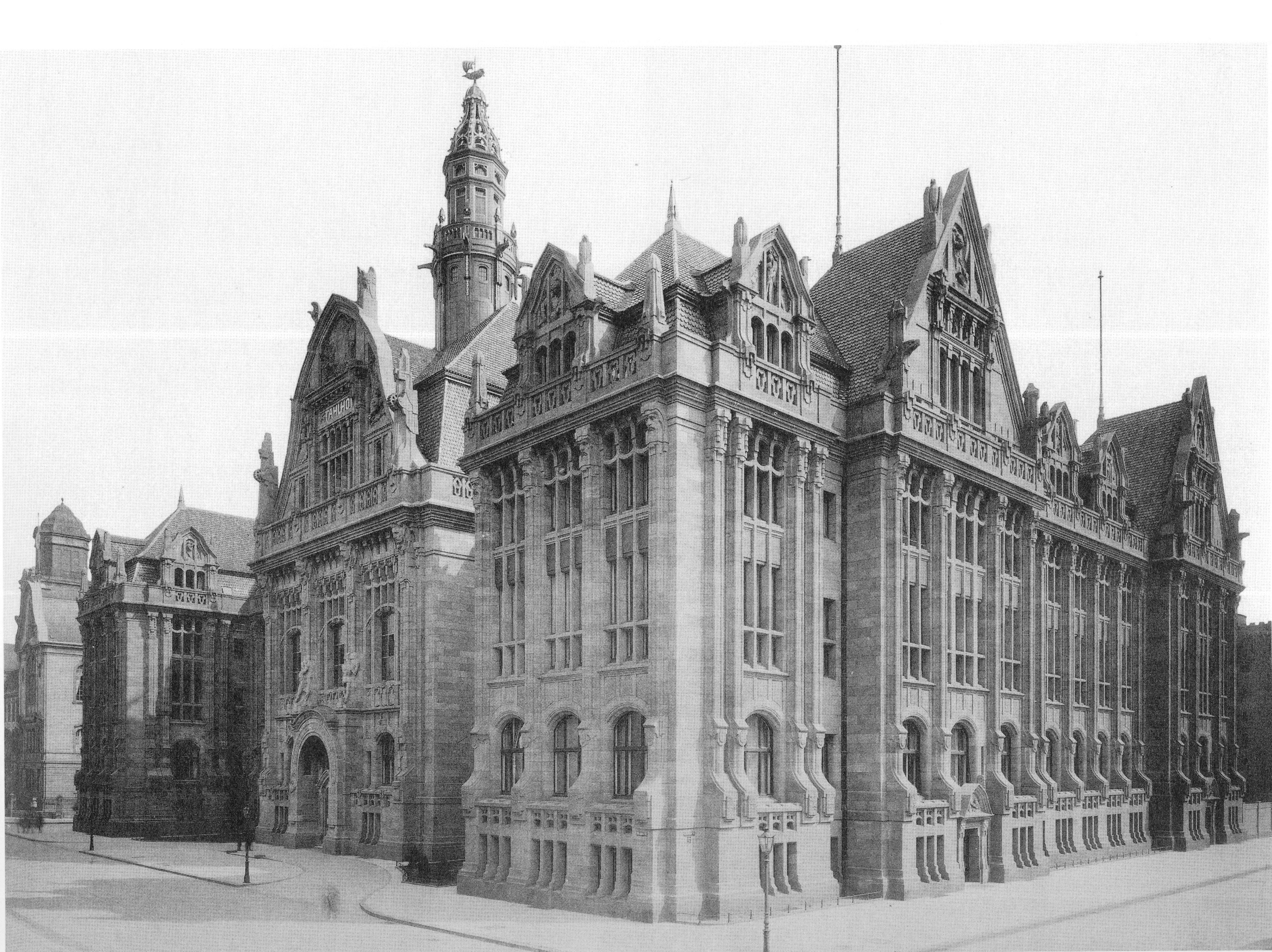
Stahlhof, vor 1909

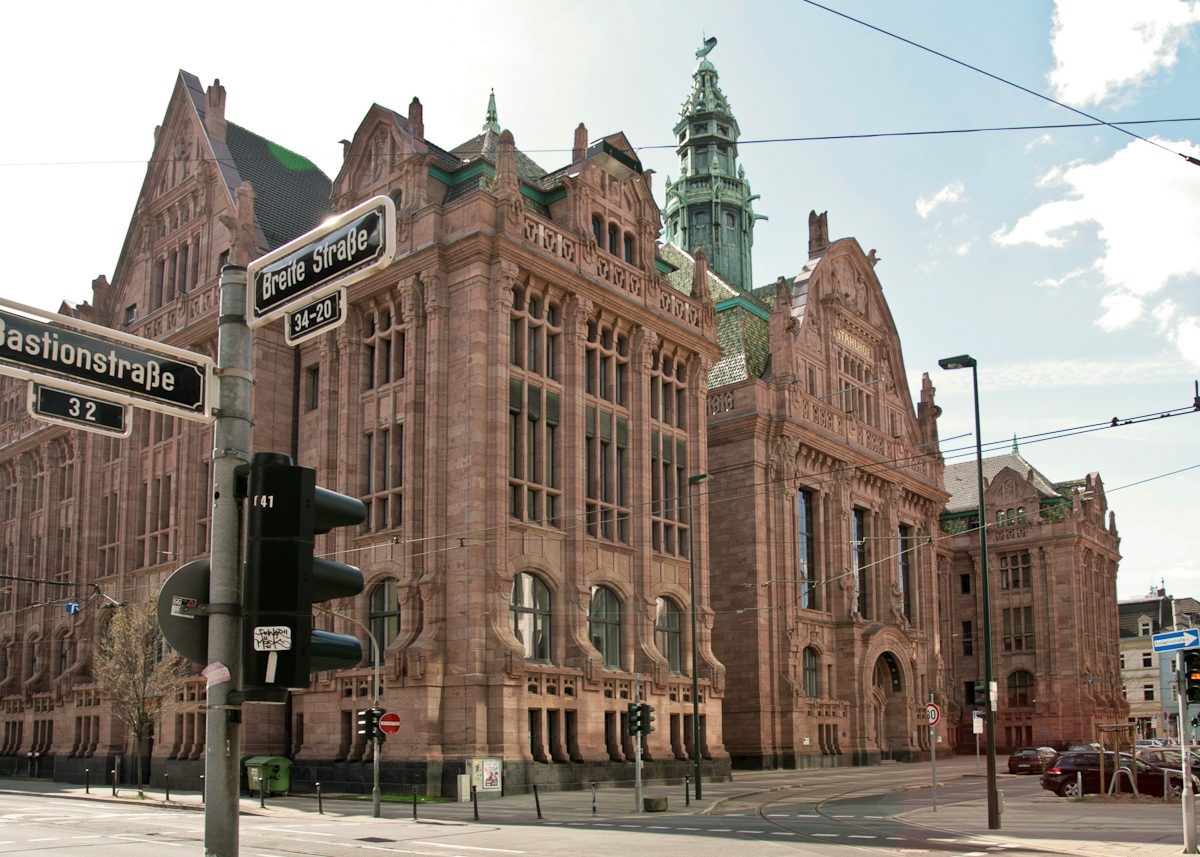
Stahlhof, from the east

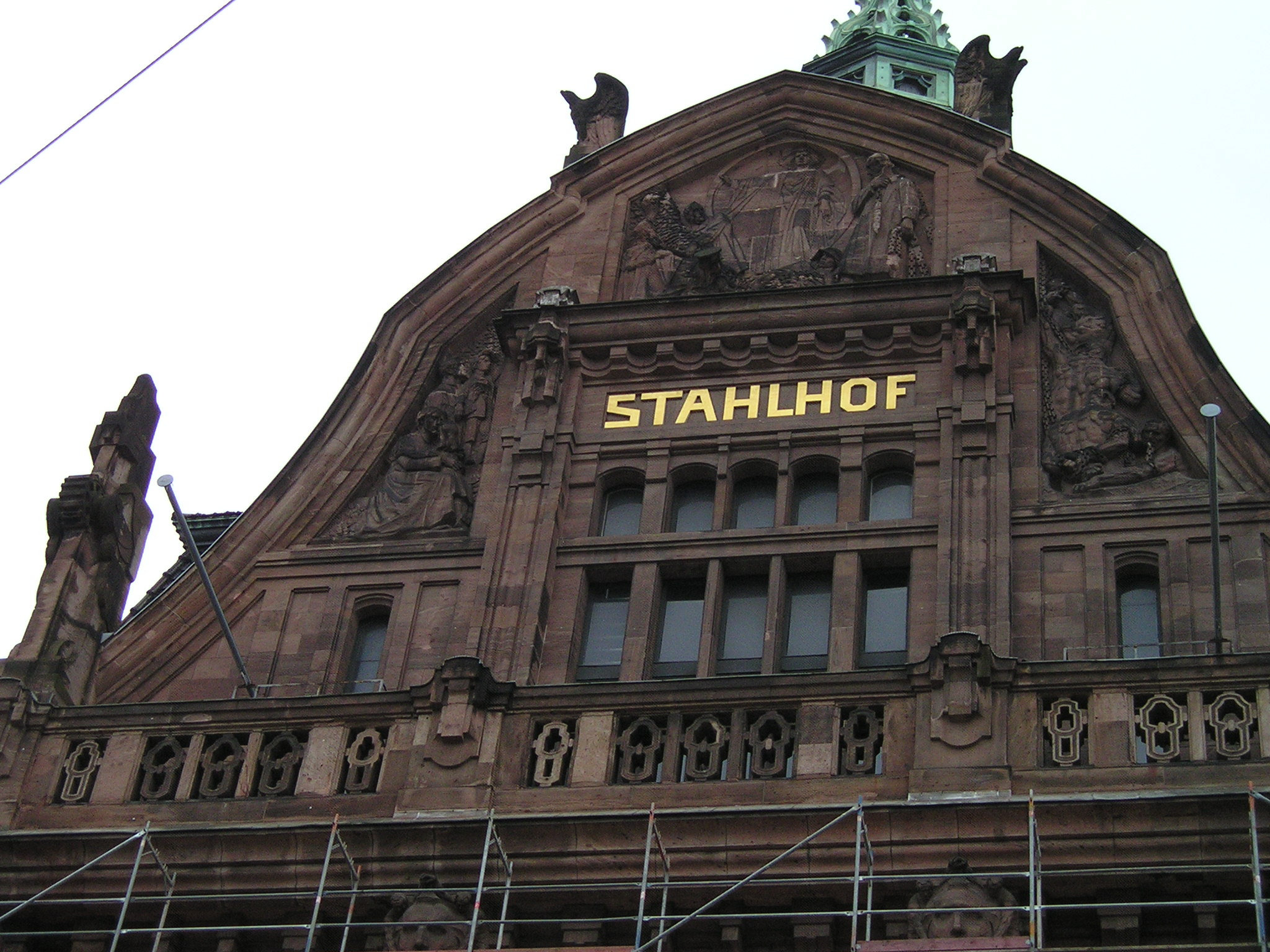
Stahlhof, north front

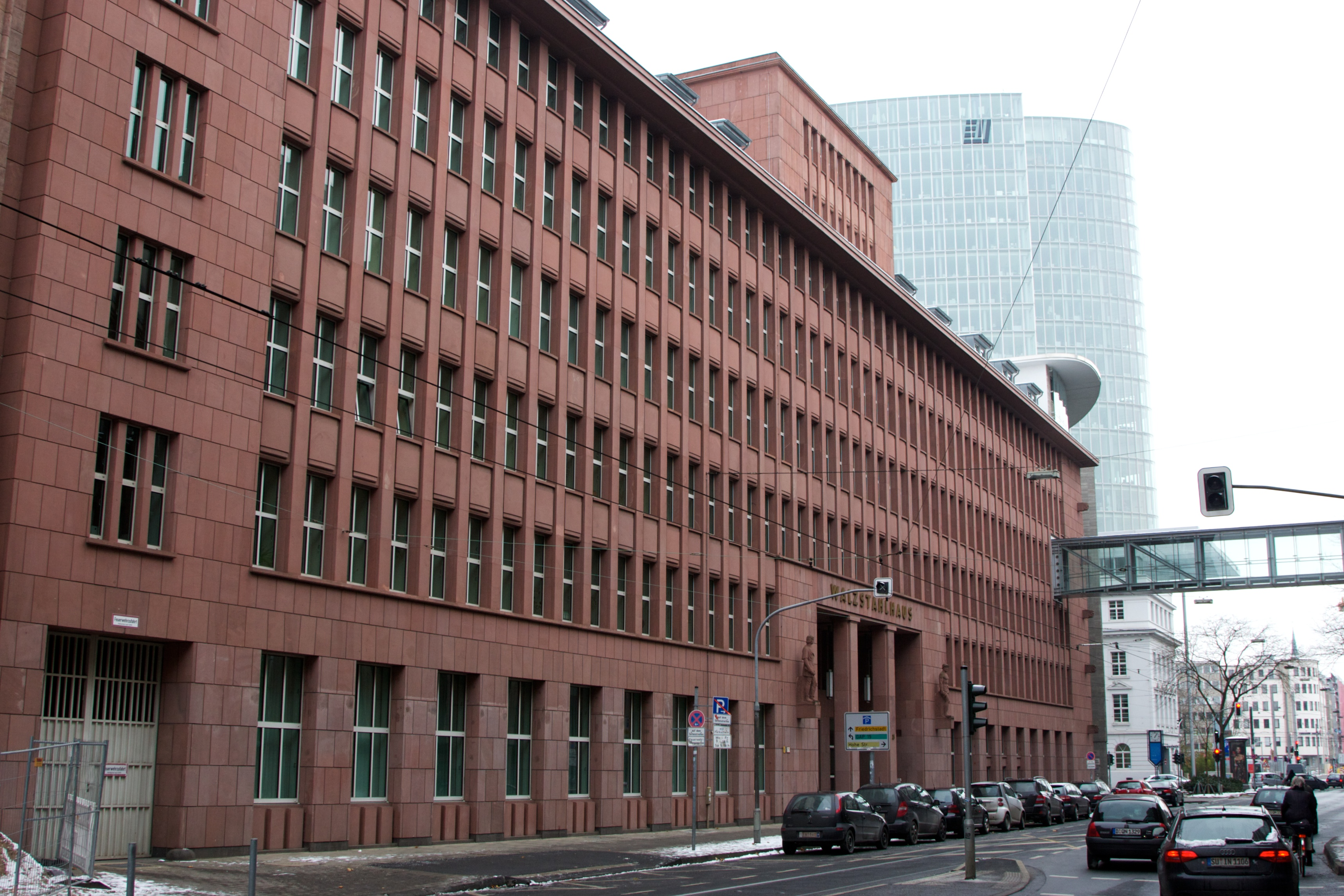
Walzstahlhaus, facade
- the "Walzstahlhaus" (Rolled Steel House), Düsseldorf, the sales office of the Association of German rolled steel entrepreneurs since 1940. The prestigious new building, planned years earlier, was apparently intended to yield appropriate premises also for the three Düsseldorf divisions of the International Steel Cartel (1933–1939). By this association, the rolled steel grades heavy plate, medium plate and universal iron were allotted to the German syndicate group, that is, the worldwide export of these product types was controlled from Düsseldorf. The building is listed because of its architecture only.
- the buildings of the German Potash Syndicate (Kalisyndikat), Staßfurt, since 1910 Berlin. Significance: conduct of a world export monopoly for potash until the First World War, then cartel leadership (along with France) for the world exportation of potash until the Second World War. In Staßfurt, the potash syndicate resided in Bodestraße. In Berlin, the syndicate complex Dessauer Str. 28–31 extended over four house numbers, which included three buildings. The photos on the bottom right show only half of the occupied building volume (No. 28/29).
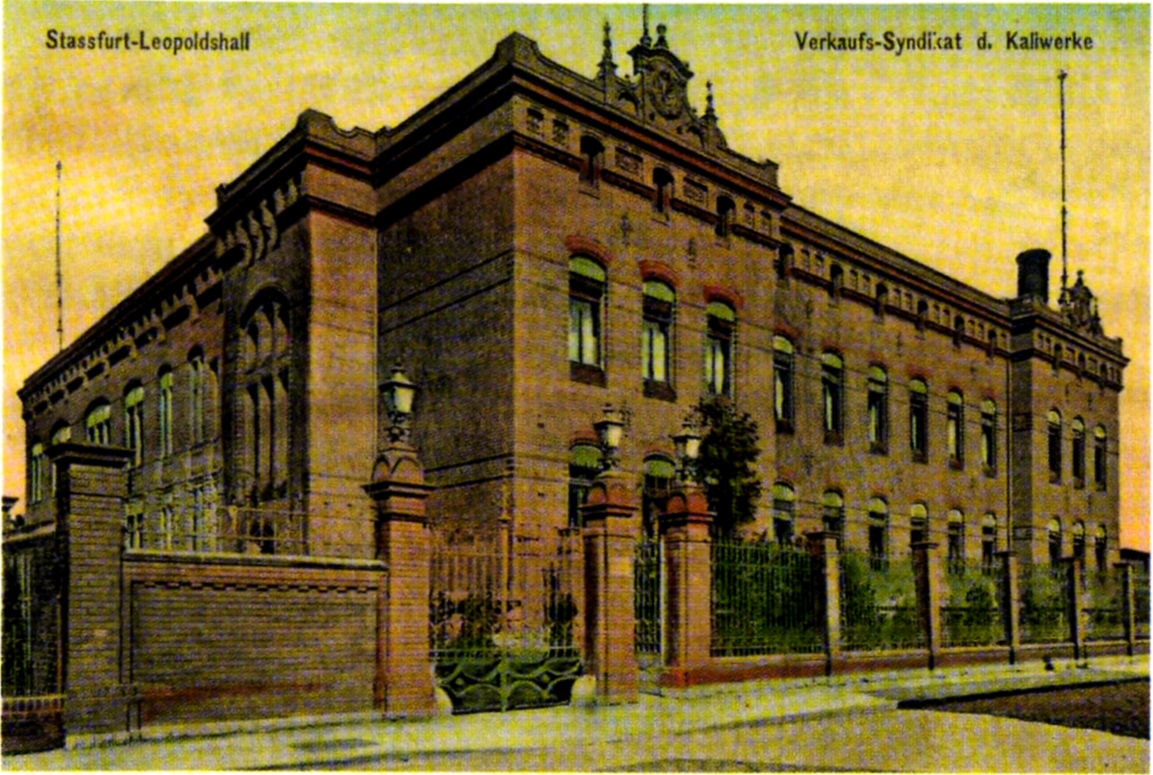
Premises of the German Potash Syndicate in Stassfurt, Bodestr., since 1890

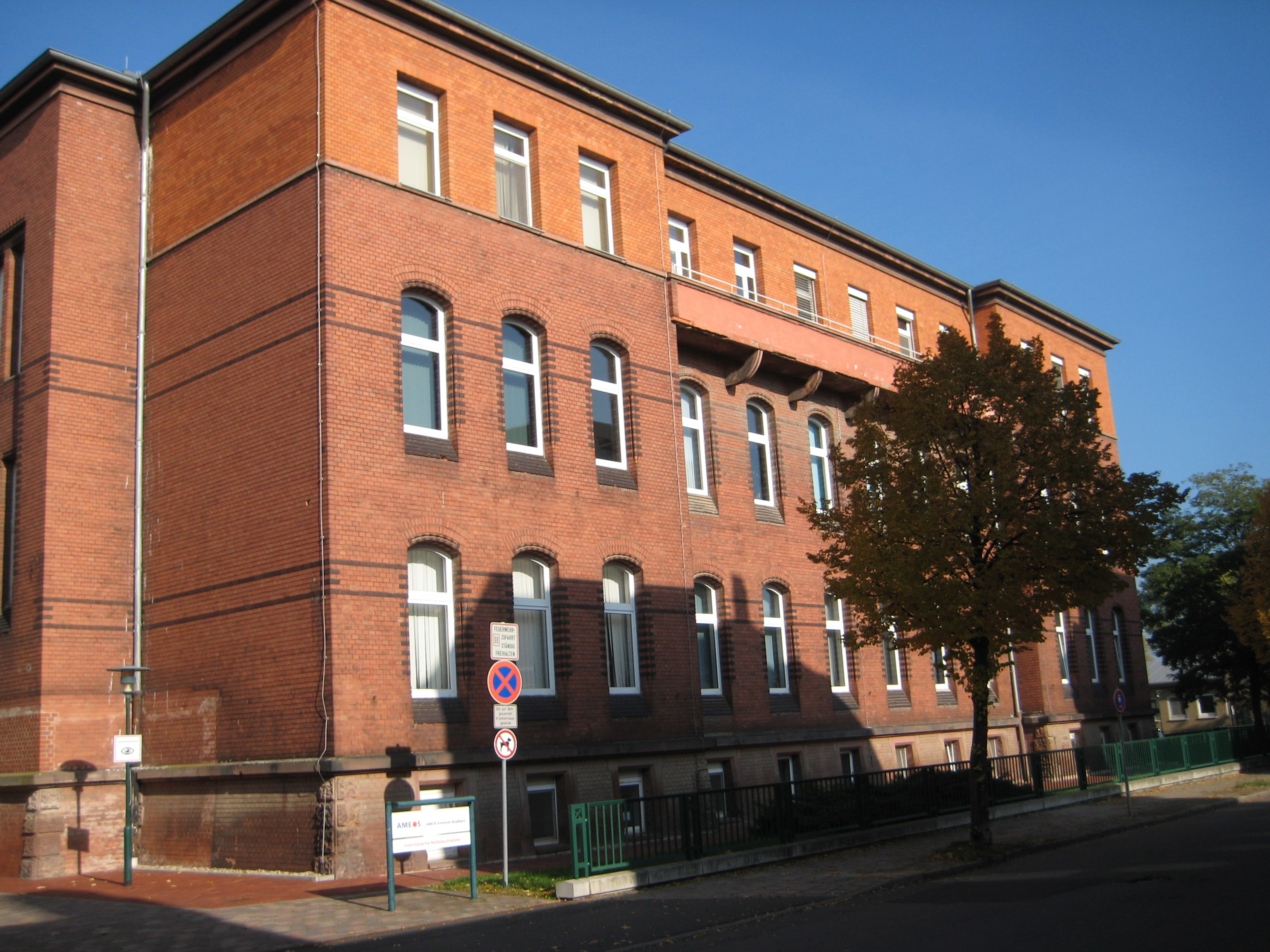
former syndicate headquarters, Stassfurt Bodestr. (streetview), 2015

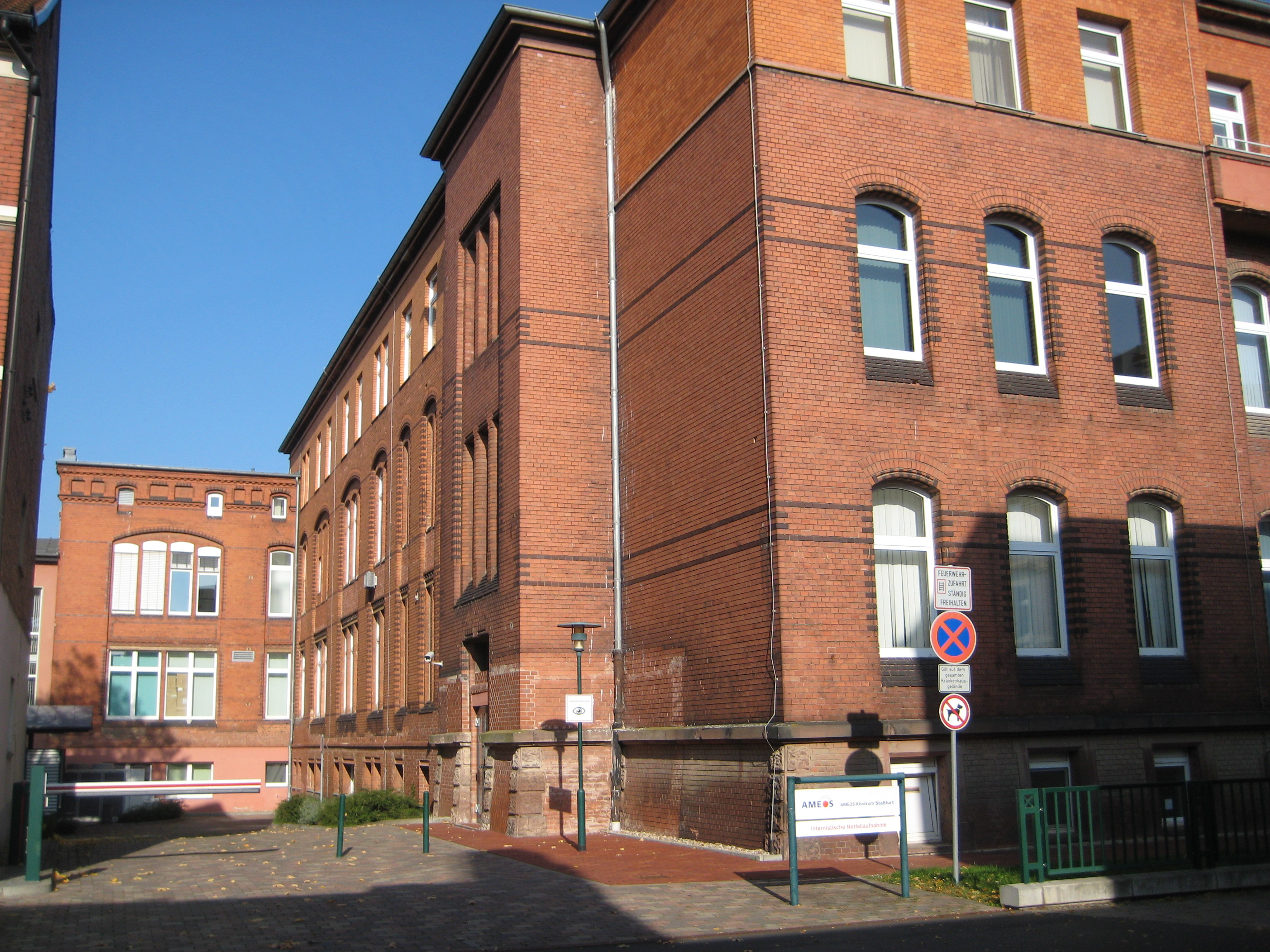
former syndicate headquarters, Stassfurt Bodestr. (left front), 2015

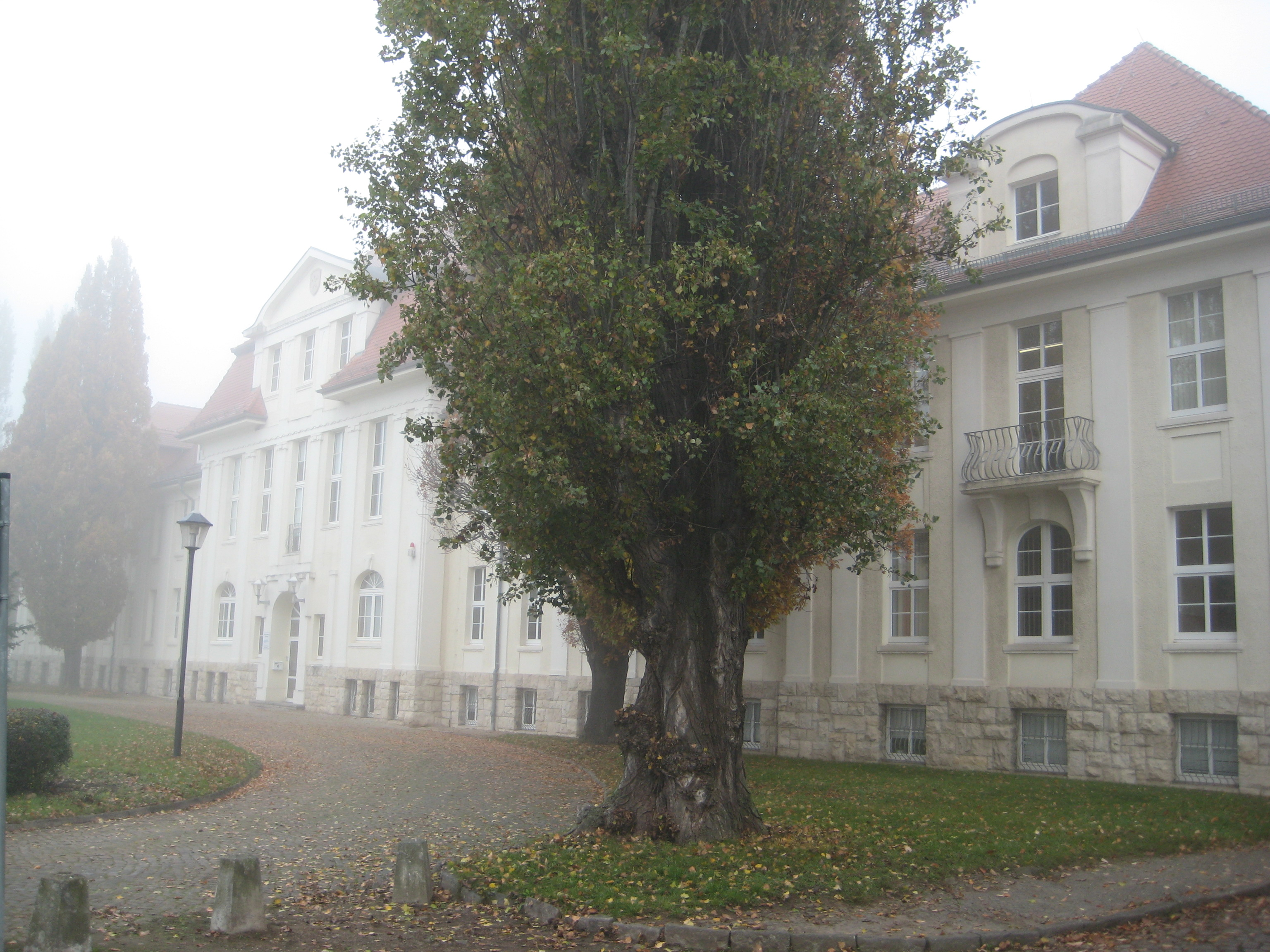
Potash mining office, Bernburger Str., 2015

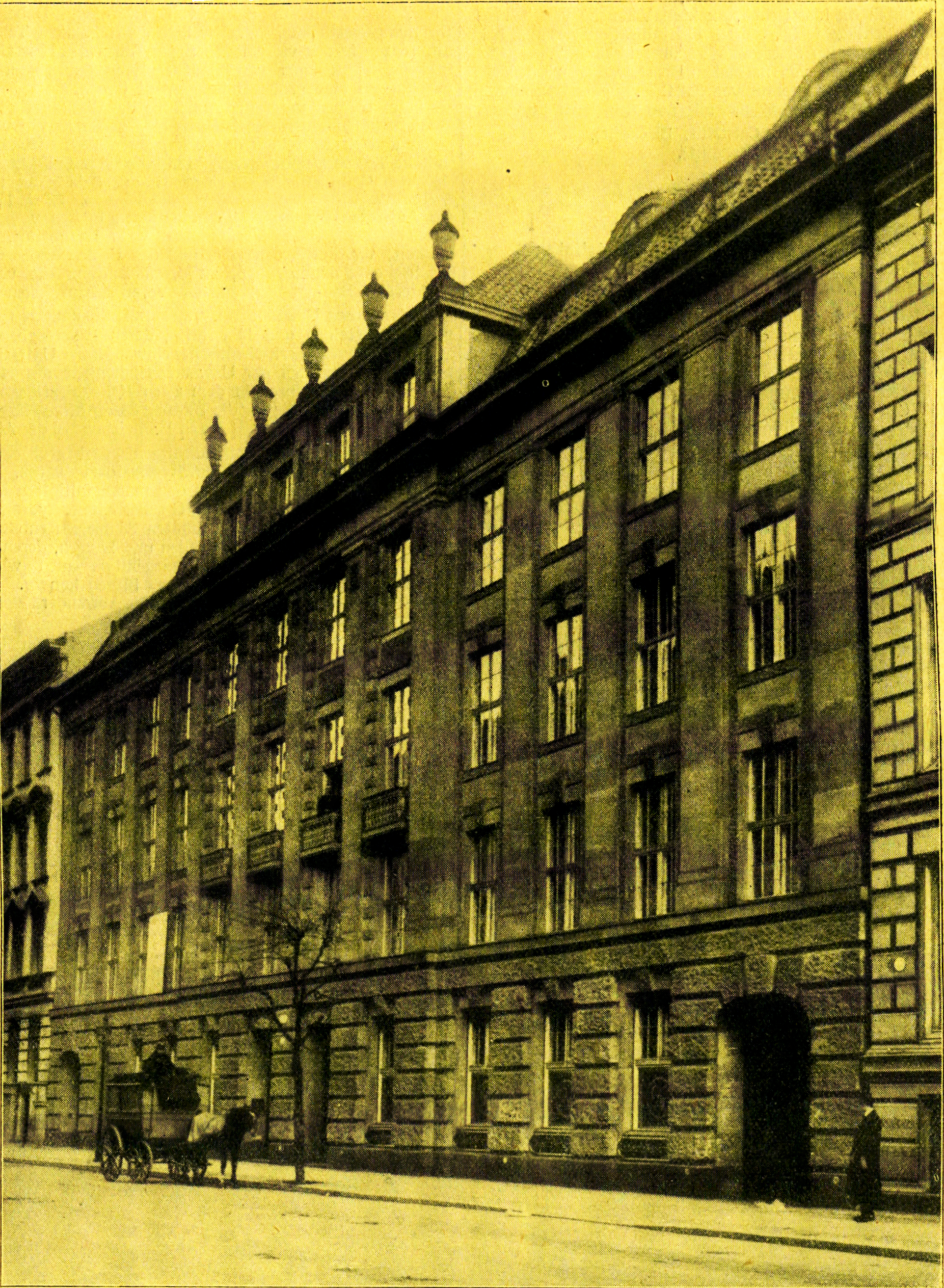
Premises of the German Potash Syndicate in Berlin Dessauer Str. 28/29, 1910

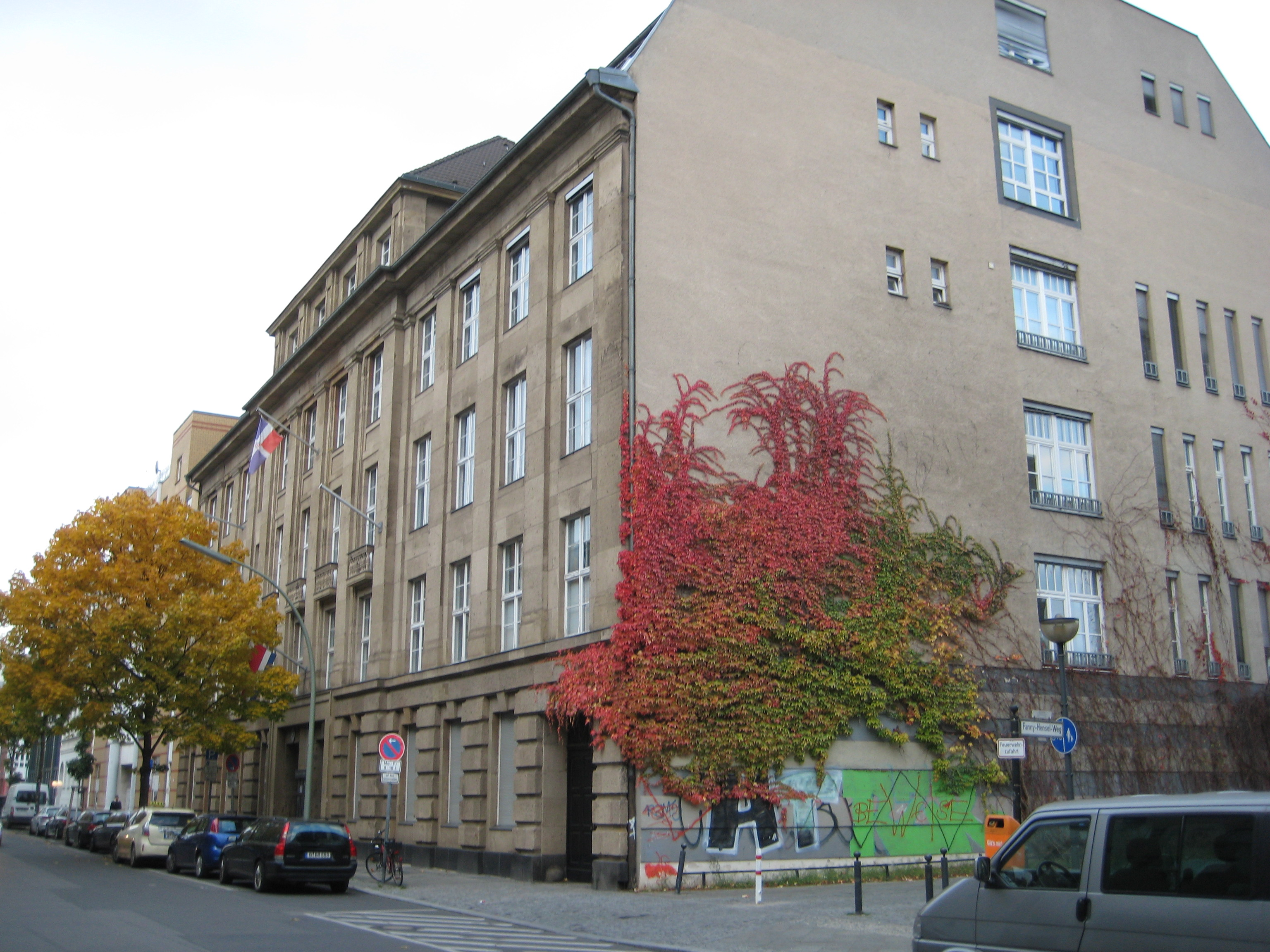
Premises of the German Potash Syndicate in Berlin Dessauer Str. 28/29, 2015
- the building of five salt-industrial syndicates, Berlin: Since 1930, the sales organizations for table salt, epsom salt, chloromagnesium salt, bromine salt and bromine have been located at Schöneberger Str. The building no longer exists (since about 1990) and has been replaced by a narrow remainder house and a further road break. The size of the vacant lot (about 40m frontage) reveals the scope of the previous premises and the glimpse of its extensive administrative functions.
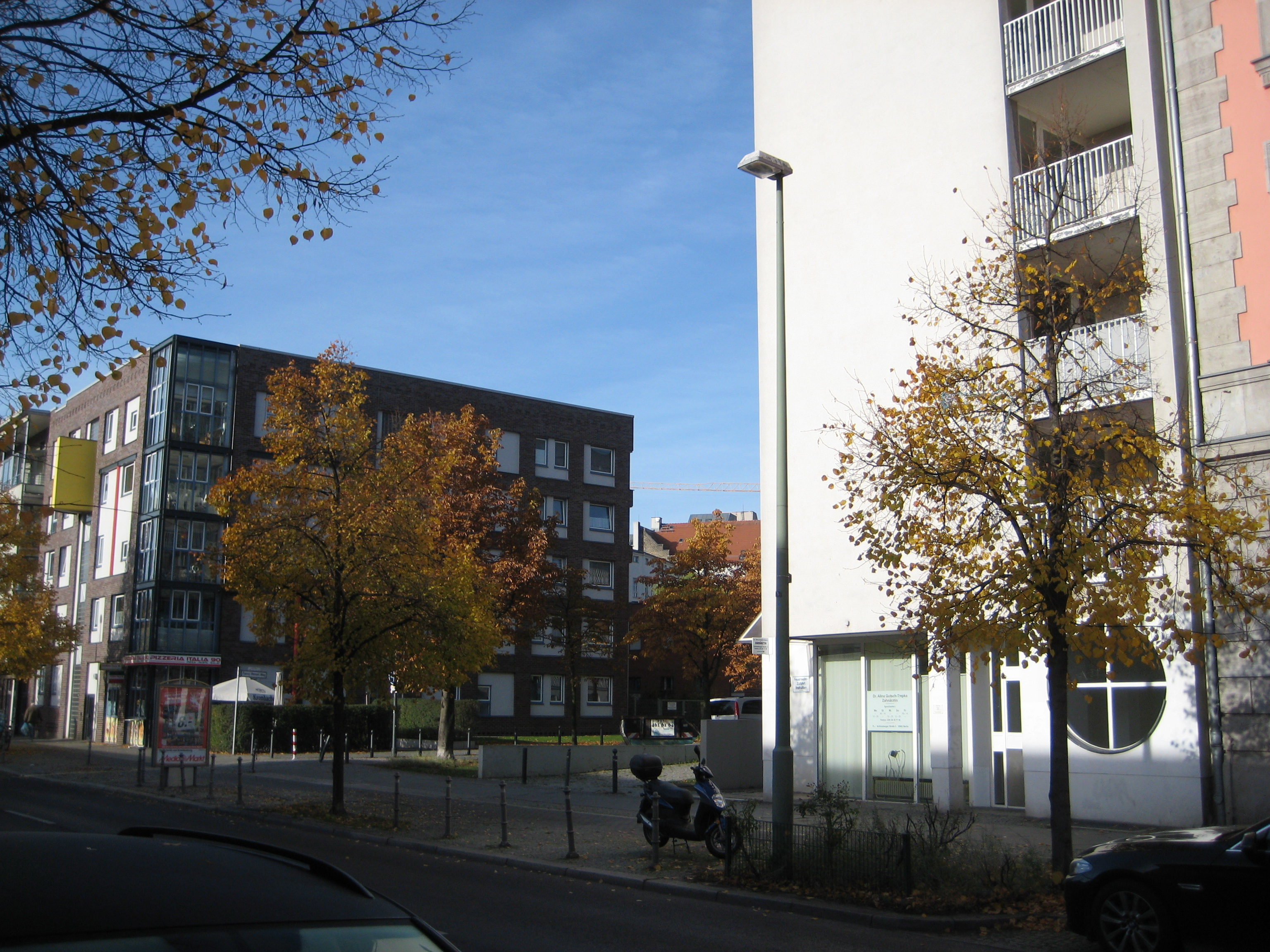
Former large building Schöneberger Str. 5, in 2015

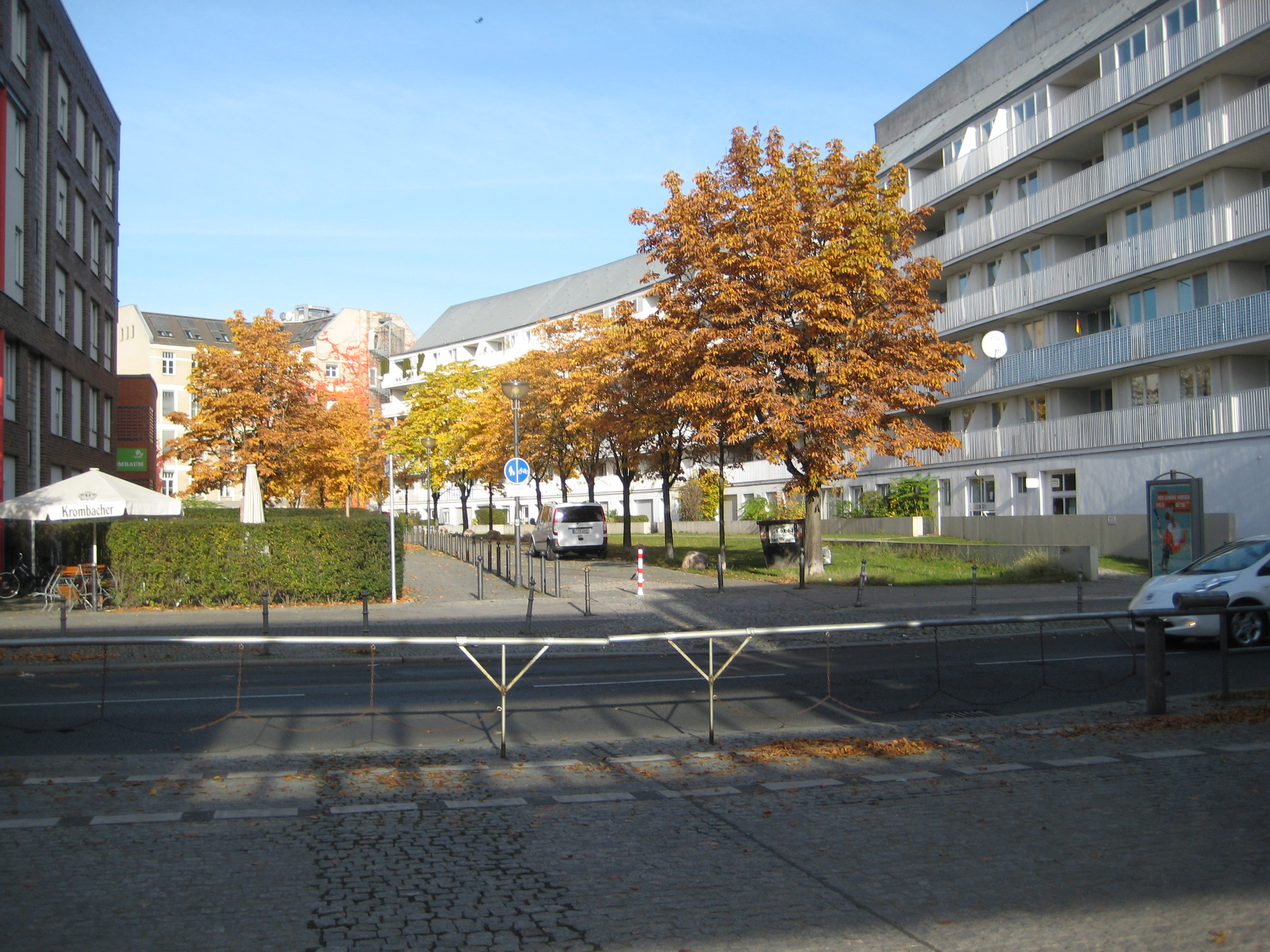
Former administration building for five special salt syndicates, now street breakthrough, in 2015
- the building of the cloth syndicate, Berlin, Anhalter Str. 5. Significance: Management of the cloth distribution in the planned economy of the Third Reich.
- the building of the rayon sales organization, Neue Kantstr. 32. Significance: Management of rayon distribution (for the production of high quality textiles) in the planned economy of the Third Reich.
- the building of the Imperial Iron Agency ("Reichsvereinigung Eisen"), Badensche Str. 24, Berlin-Wilmersdorf: destroyed or/and demolished, new building as a commercial building.
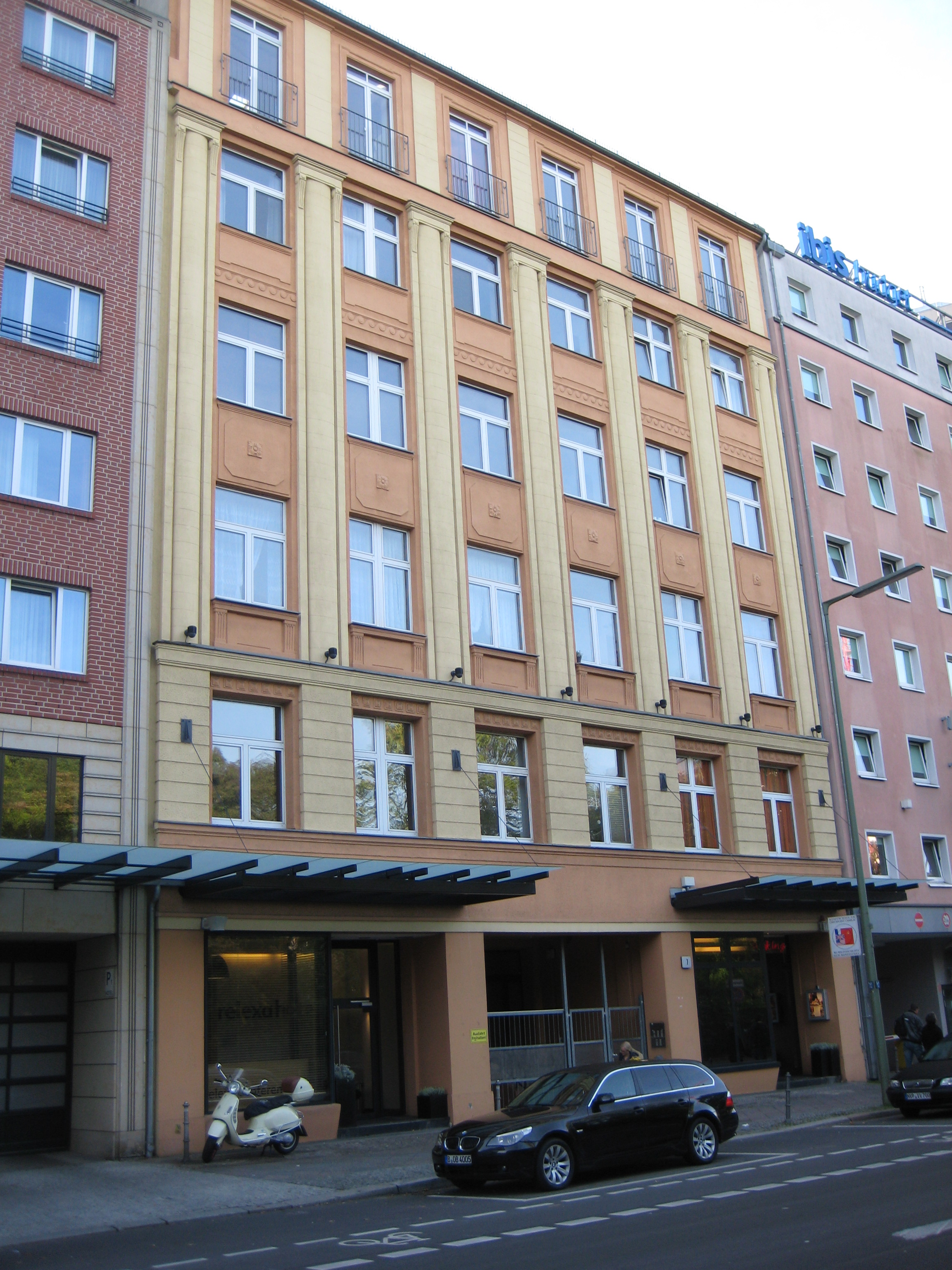
Tuchsyndikat: cloth distribution in the Third Reich, building in 2015

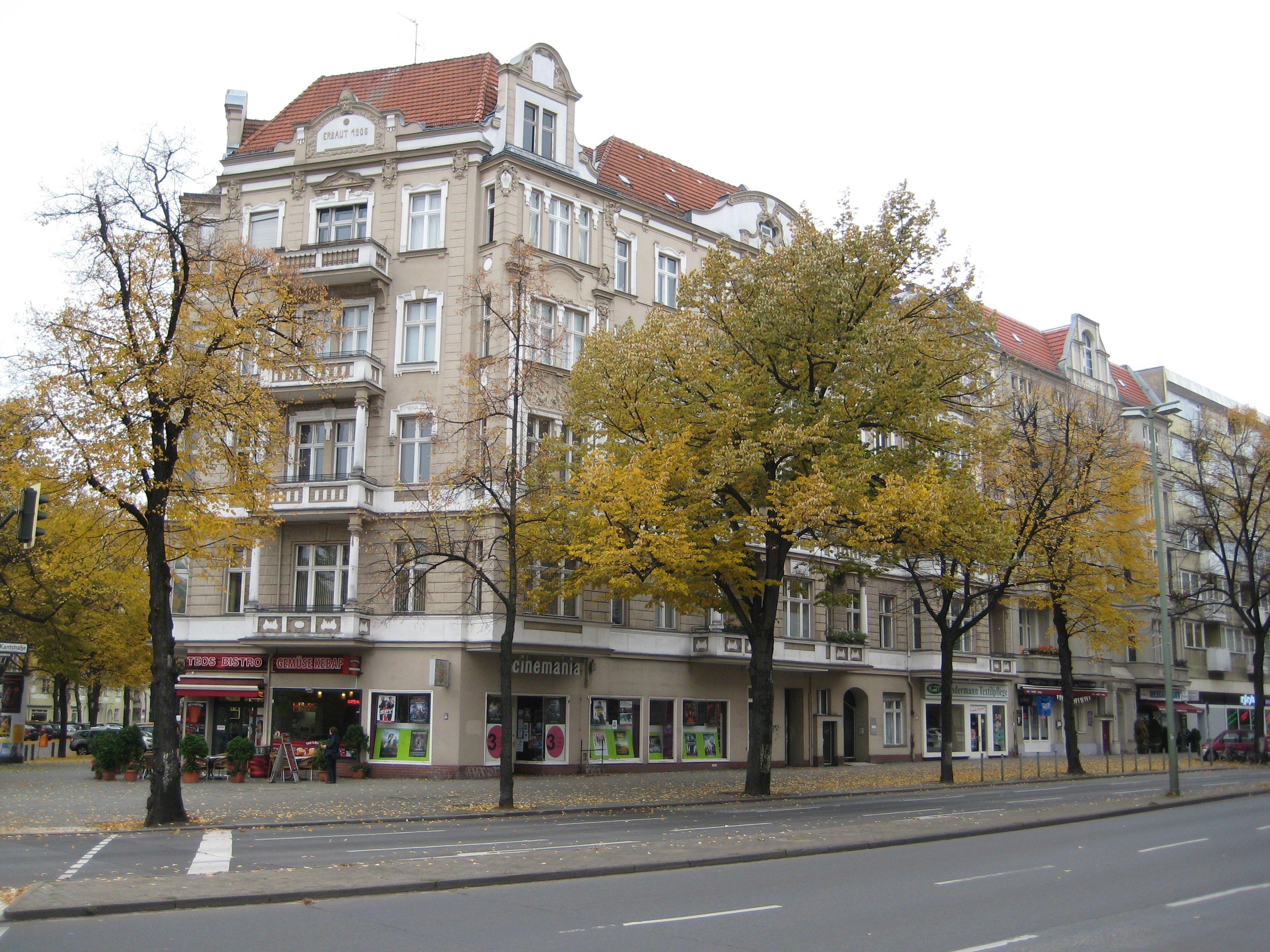
rayon ring: rayon distribution in Third Reich, building in 2015

=== Great Britain ===
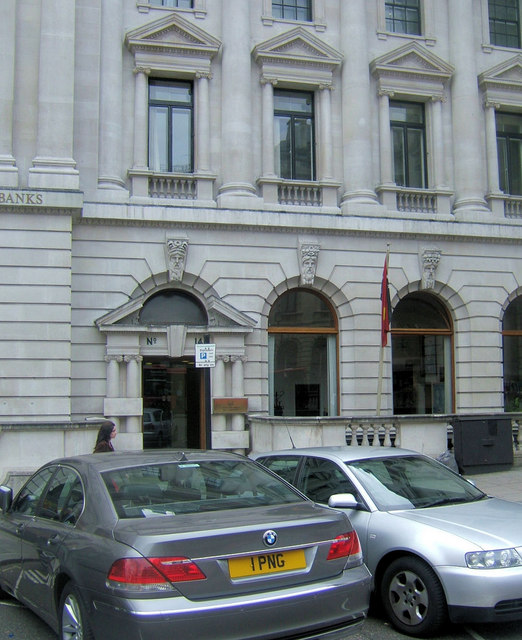
Former International Black Sheets Sales Agency, 14 Waterloo Place

- London (Westminster): the Steelhouse, Tothill Street. This was the seat of the British Iron & Steel Federation, the British Iron and Steel Corporation Limited and also the British Steelwork Association. While the "Association" and the "Federation" were political organs, the "Corporation" did the practical sales and clearing work.
- London, SW 1: the building of the International Black Sheets Sales Agency of 1936, 14 Waterloo Place. Belgium, France, Germany, Luxembourg, Poland, Czechoslovakia and the United Kingdom, Denmark, the Netherlands and Italy Poland were regular members of this export cartel. The United States was affiliated to the cartel through individual agreements.

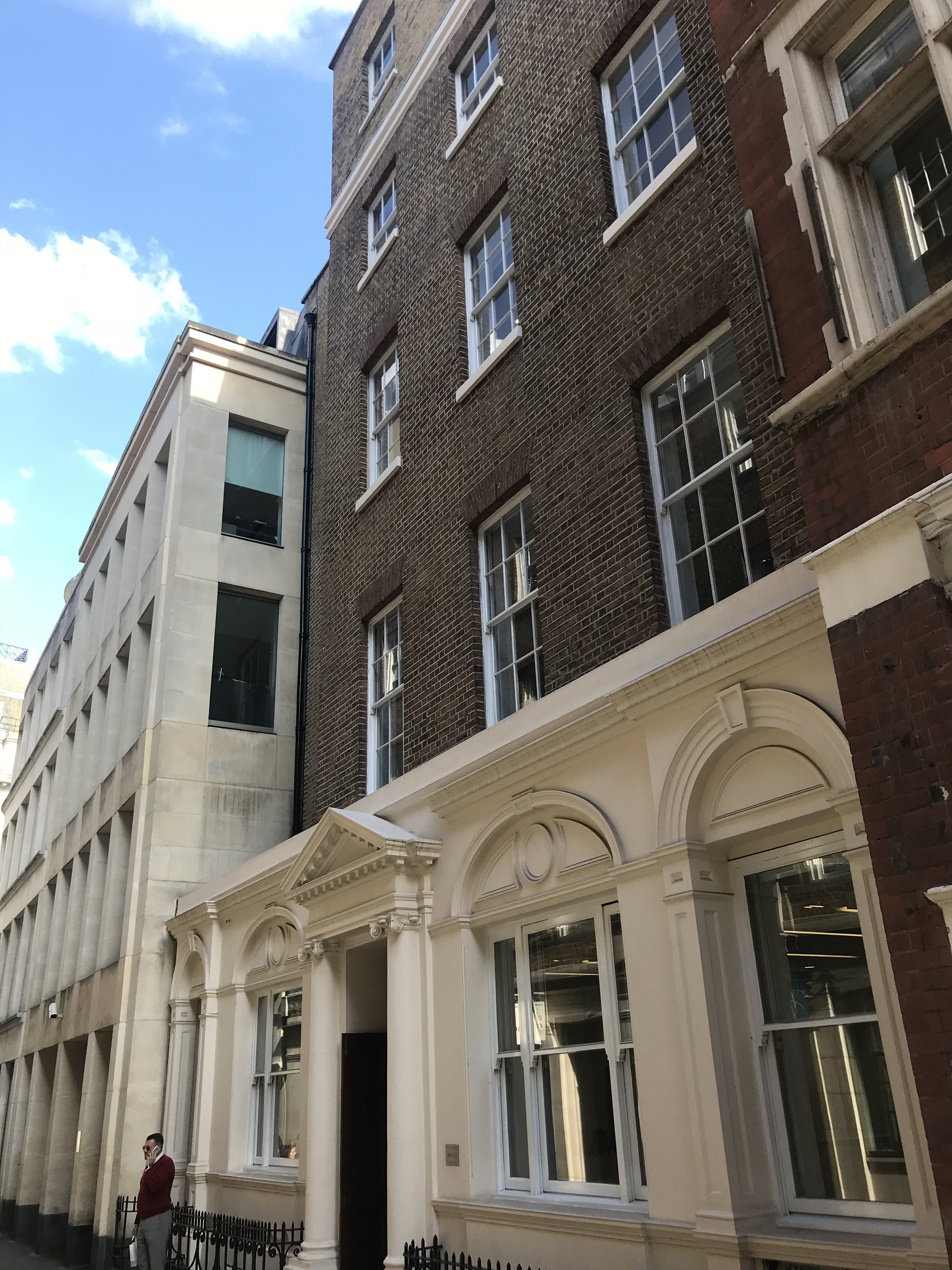
Former International Rail Makers Association, 11 Ironmonger Lane

- London: the building 11 Ironmonger Lane, where the International Rail Makers Association (IRMA) was based, was a subtenant of the Chartered Accountants Plight, Warwick, Mitchell & Co. The previously existing cartel was re-established in 1926. Its members were Belgium, France, Germany, Luxembourg, Poland, Czechoslovakia, Austria, Hungary, Great Britain, the United States and two independent business groups.
- London, in the same building 11 Ironmonger Lane was the seat of the International Tin Plate Association. This association was founded in 1934. Members were France, Germany, Great Britain, the United States, Belgium and Norway. Italy was connected by a special contract.

=== Luxembourg ===
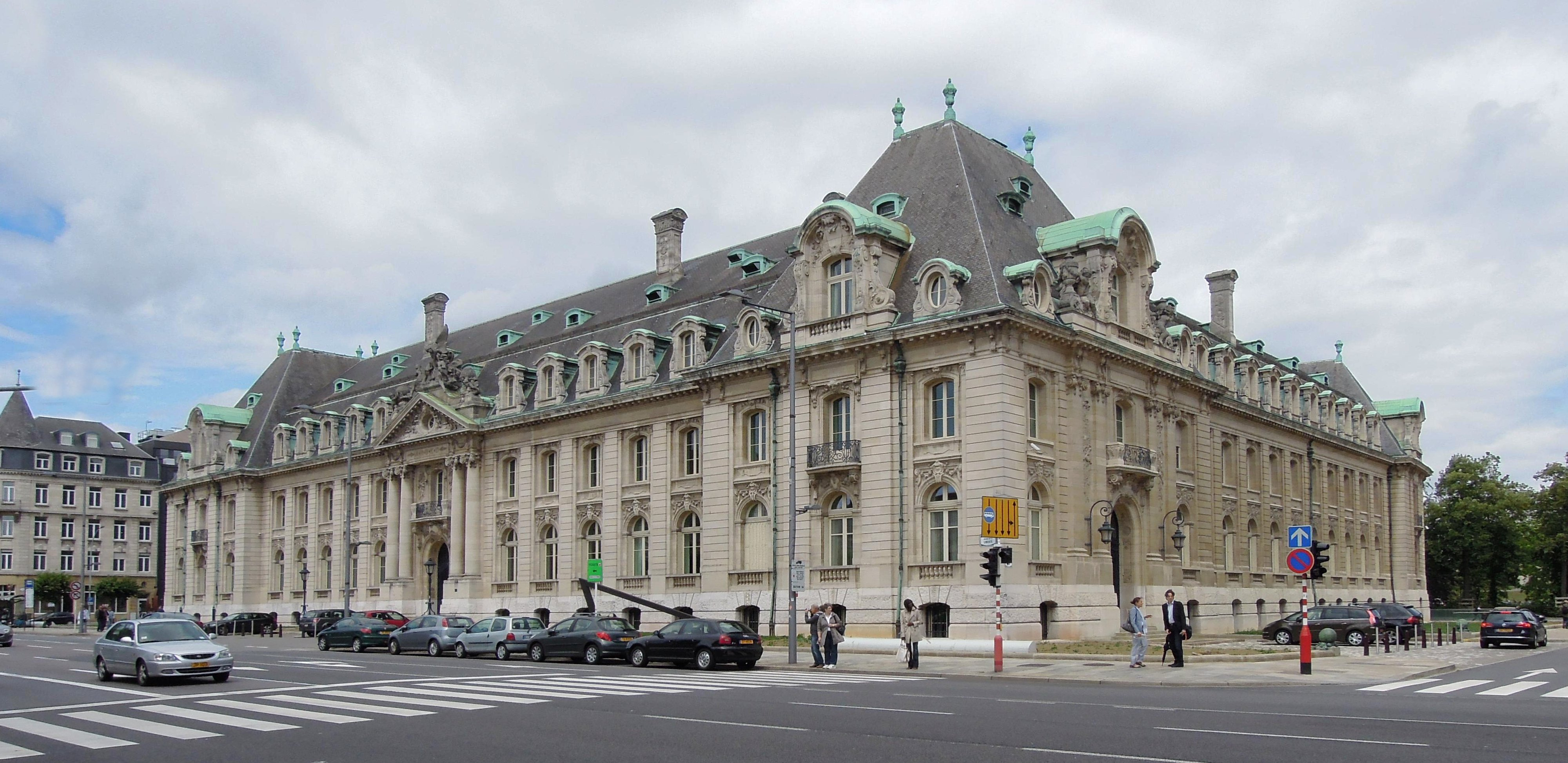
Former COLUMETA seat, around 2010

- Luxembourg City, the building of COLUMETA SA (Comptoir luxembourgeois de métallurgie), 1920–1976. Members: two steel companies ARBED, Terres Rouges. Joint building of both companies and COLUMETA since 1922. Significance: joint Luxembourg sales office since the secession from the customs union with Germany causing the end of the syndication with German steel companies. The building has been listed since 2013 as a historical headquarters of ARBED.

=== Netherlands ===
- The Hague: the building of the Nederlandsch Cement-Syndicaat (circa 1900–1970), Bezuidenhoutseweg 1. The association was originally established in Rotterdam but later relocated its sales office to Den Hague.

=== Poland ===
- Katowice: the building of the "Syndicate of Polish Ironworks" (Syndykat Polskich Hut Żelaznych) in Katowice , Lompy 14. The association had commissioned the building in 1926 and moved to it after completion in 1932. In this trade association, the iron and steel producers of Poland were united. Housed under the same address was the sub-organization Export Union of the Polish Ironworks (Zwiazelc Eksportowy Polskich Hut Zelaznych). This national export cartel was an associated member of International Steel Cartel between 1927 and 1931 as well as after its reestablishment from 1933 to 1939. After the nationalization of the Polish steel industry 1945/47, the building fell under the responsibility of the Ministry of Metallurgy in Warsaw. In 1947, the Socialist "Iron and Steel Metallurgy Association" settled in the building. After the political turnaround in 1989, the premises kept being used for industrial purposes. Since 1991, the newly founded, capitalist-oriented "Association of the Polish Steel Industry" (Hutnicza Izba Przemysłowo Handlowa) has been based there.
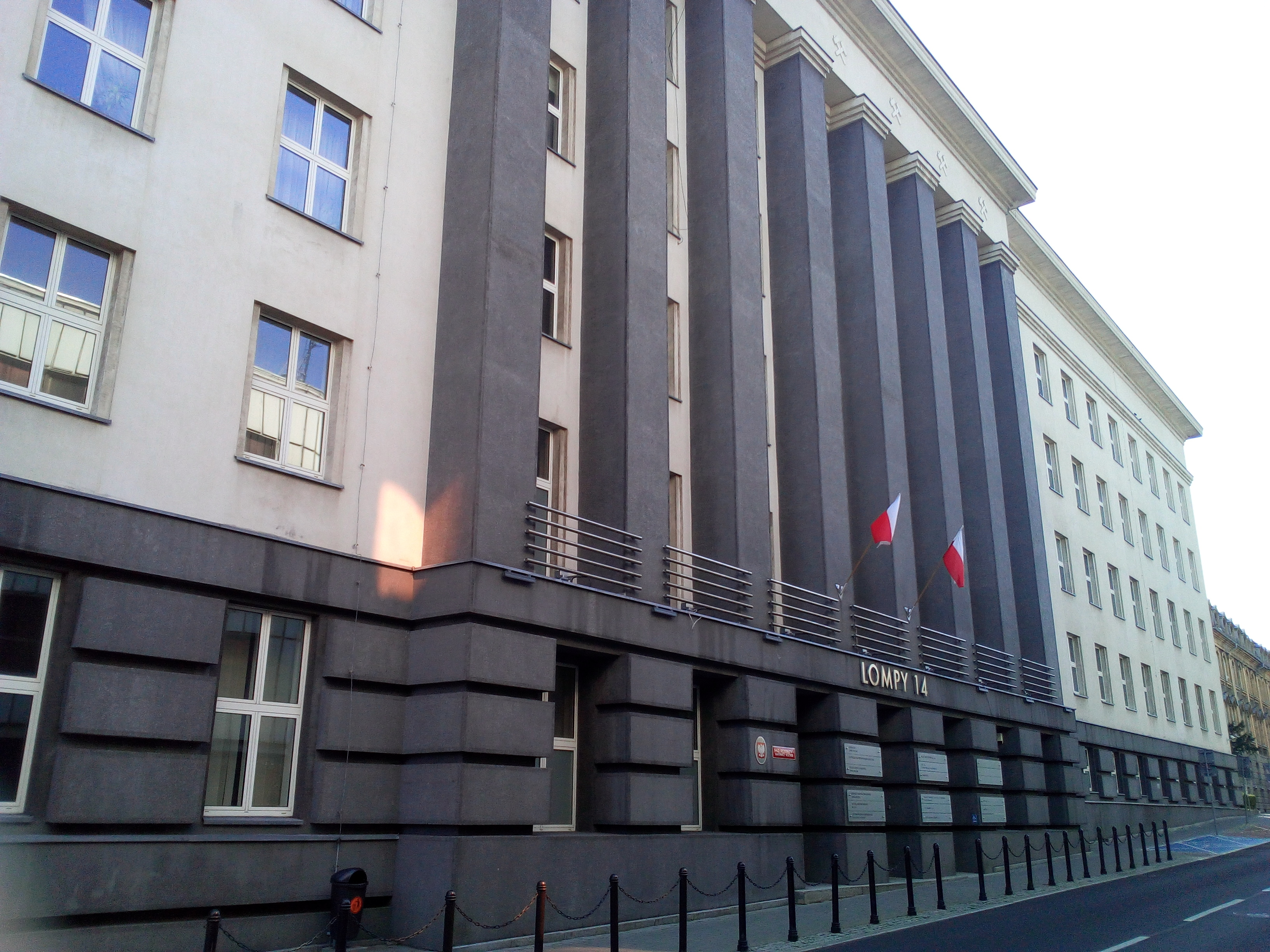
Headquarter of the Polish steel industry, built in 1926–32, from left

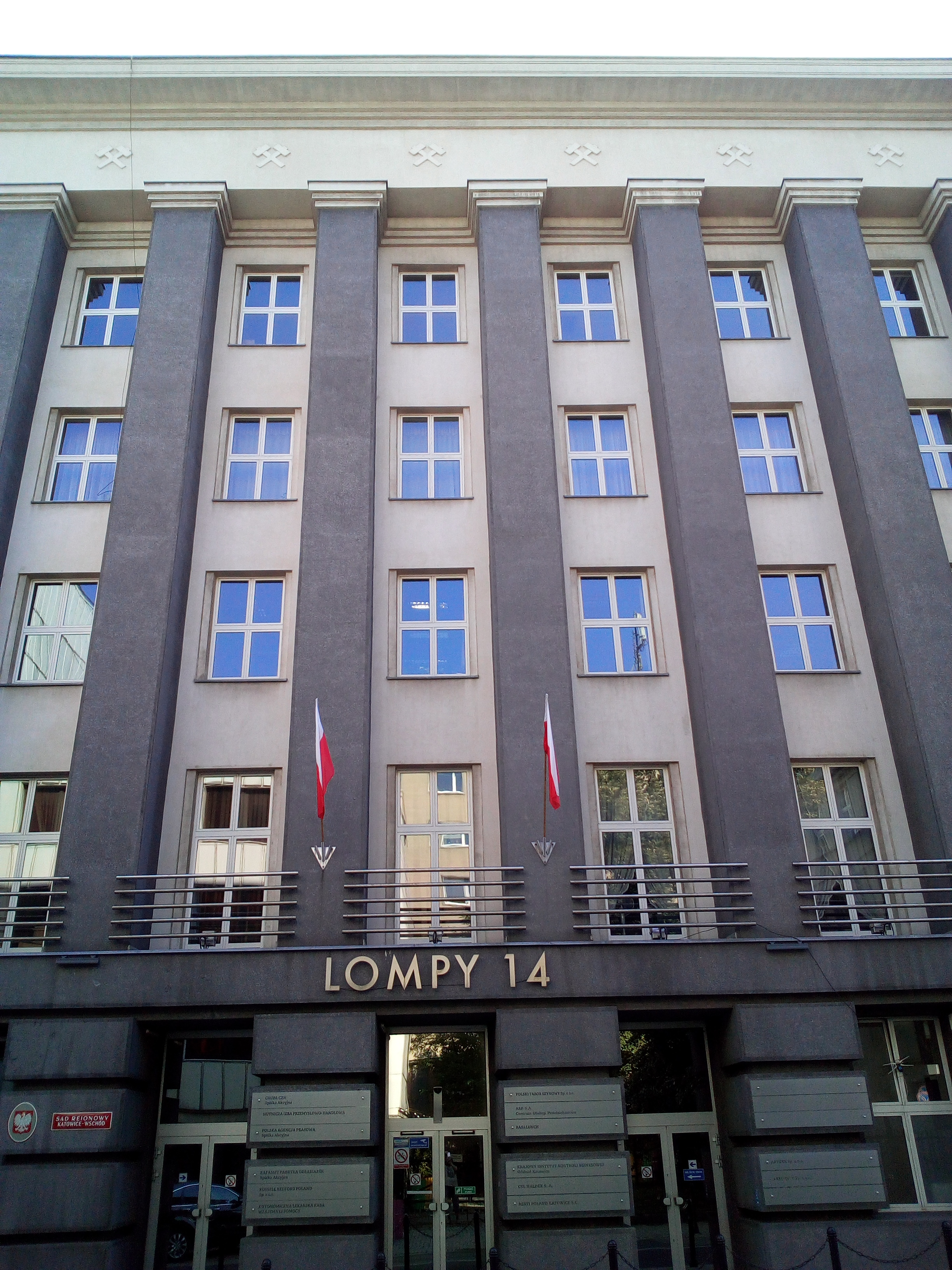
Headquarter of the Polish steel industry, facade decoration

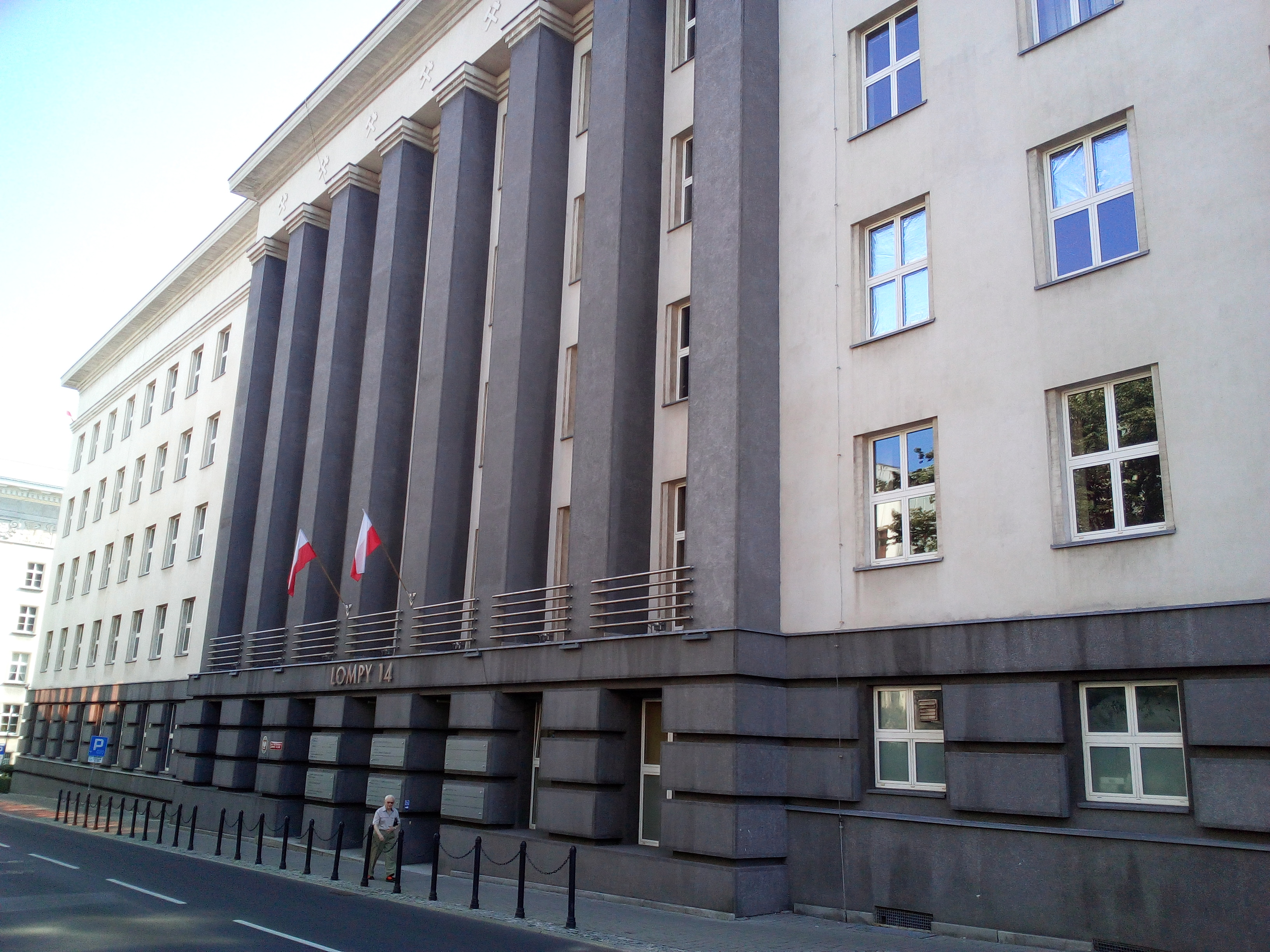
Headquarter of the Polish steel industry, from right
- Opole, formerly "Oppeln": the building of the "Central sales office of the Silesian Portland cement factories" or respectively the "Association of Silesian Portland Cement Factories" (until 1929), later the "Norddeutsche Cement-Verband GmbH., Verk.-St. Opole, Hippelstr. 10 "(today: Opole, Damrota 10).
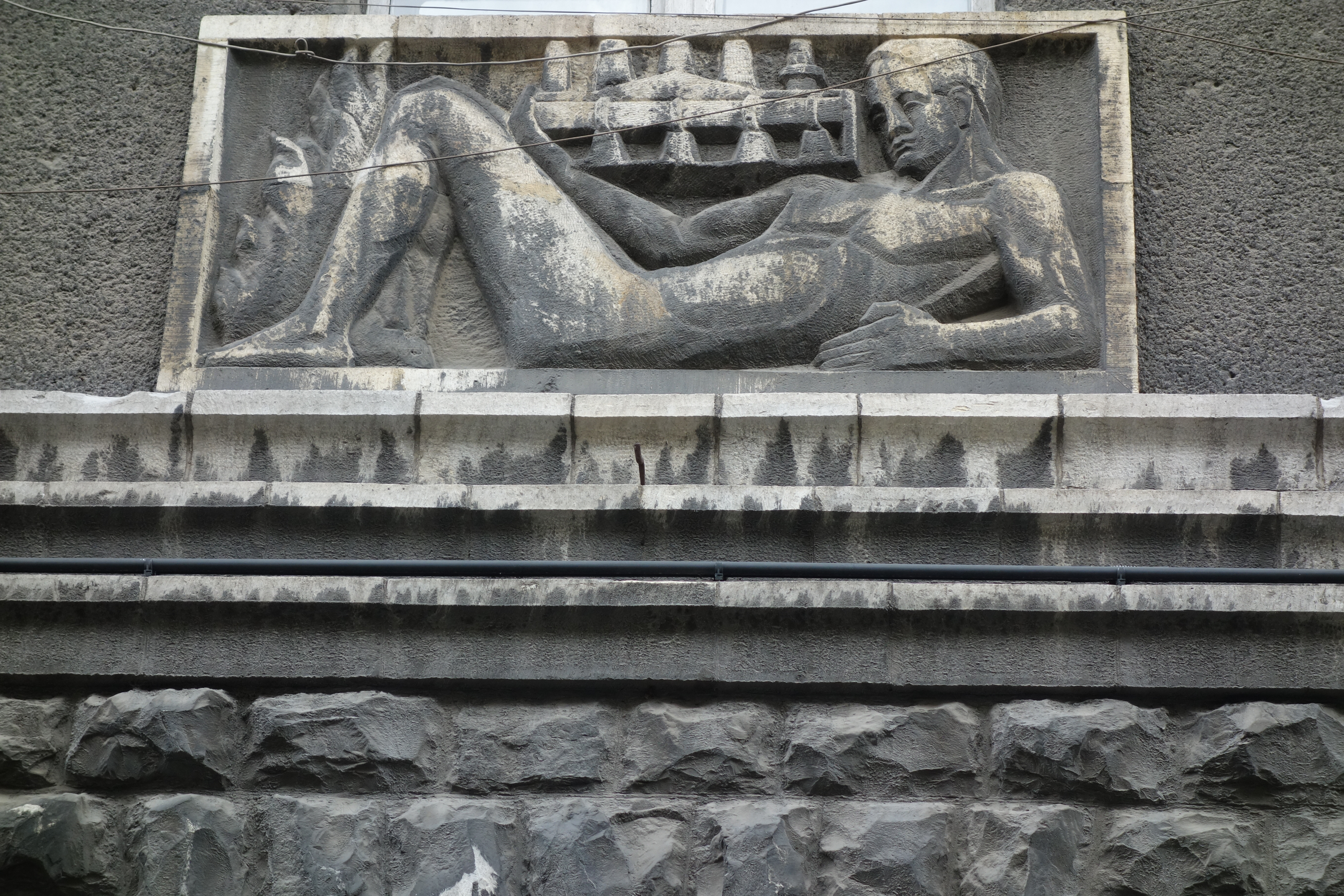
The building of a former cement cartel / facade decoration

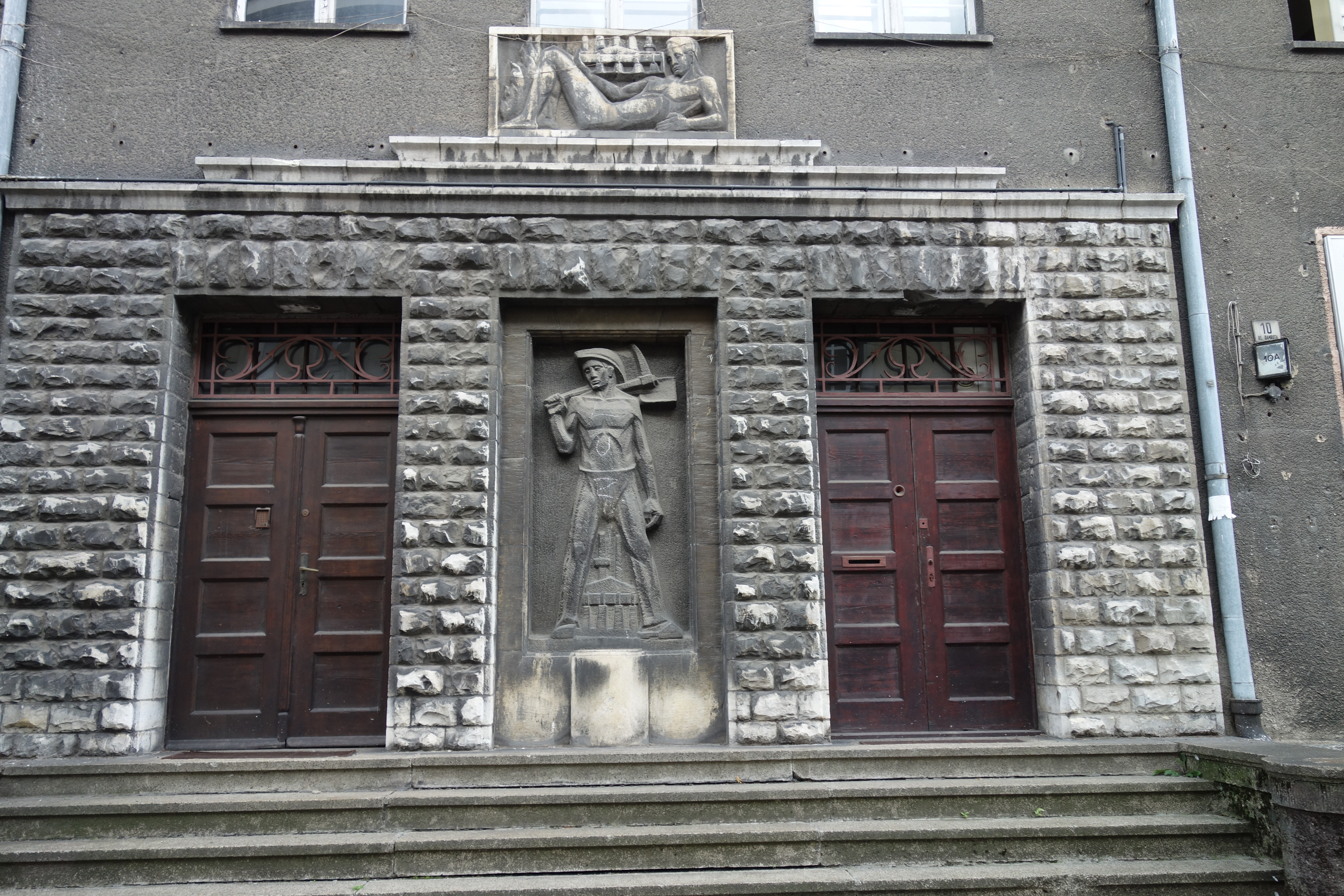
The building of a former cement cartel / entrance & facade decoration

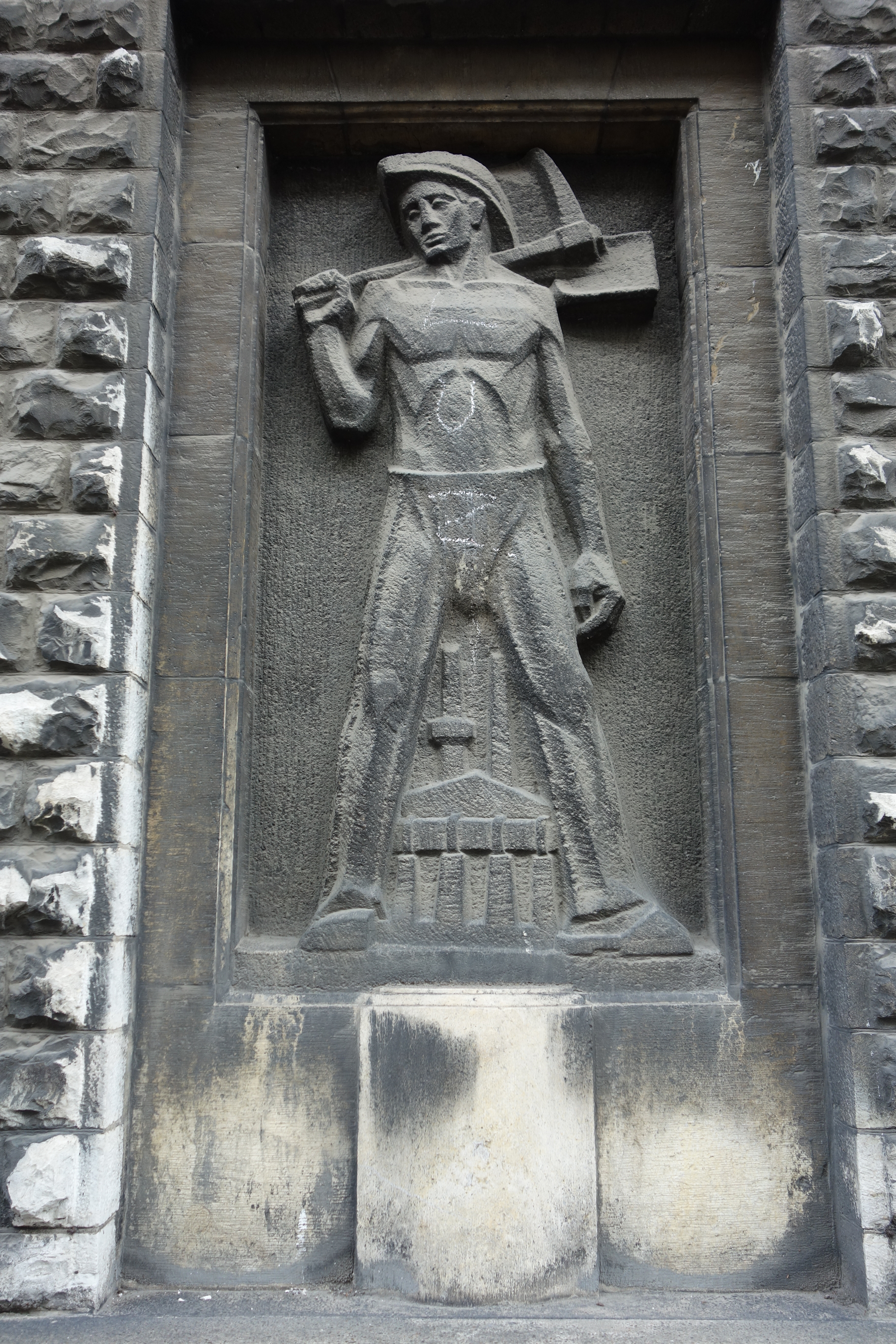
The building of a former cement cartel / facade decoration

=== Spain ===
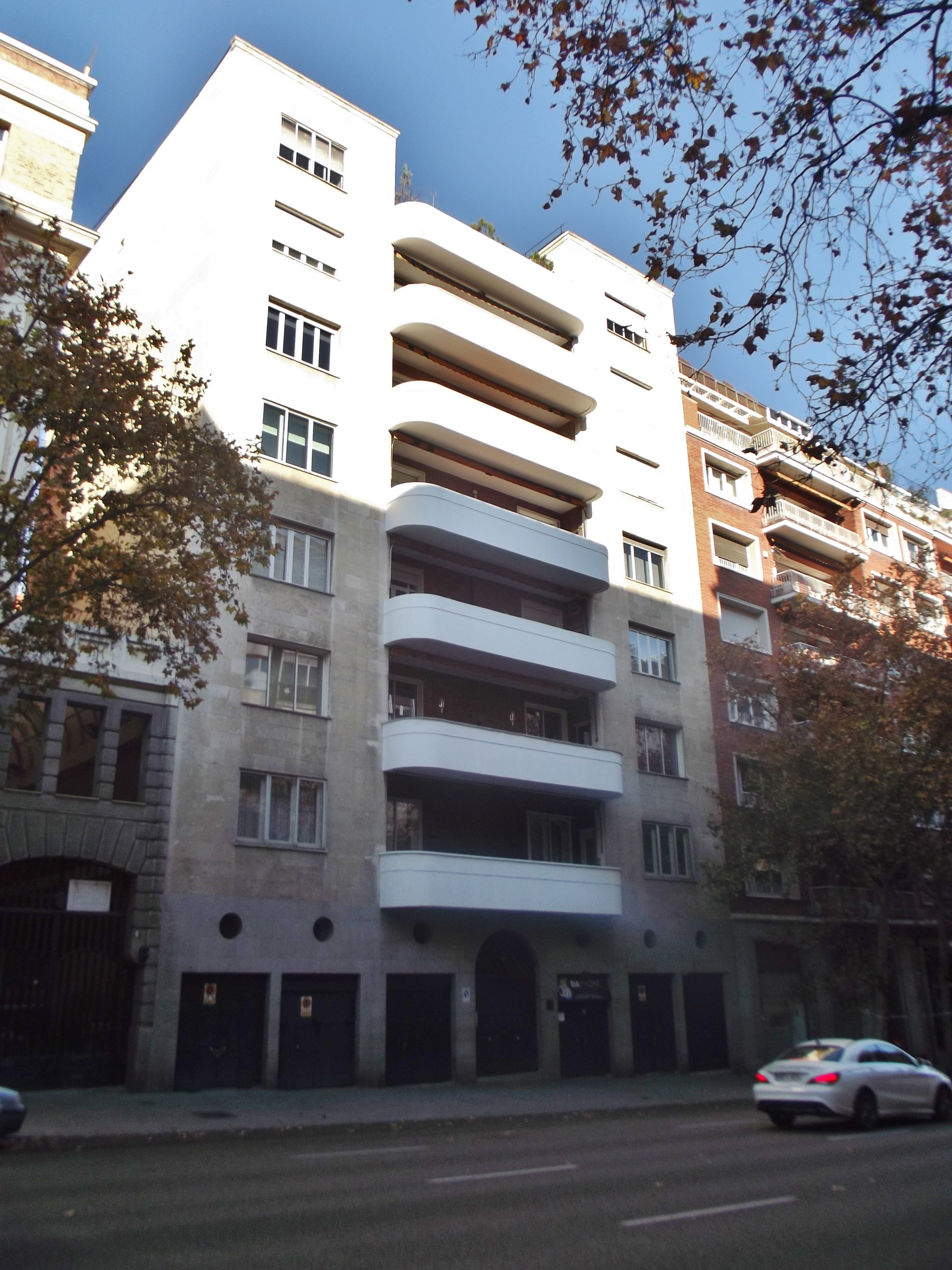
Oficemen, Calle José Abascal, 53

- Madrid, Calle José Abascal, 53: the building of OFICEMEN (Grupo Nacional Autónomo de Fabricantes de Cementos Artificiales), the Spanish Cement Manufacturers’ Group. This was a cartel between 1931 and 1980 and successor of a loose first association of cement factories that was formed in 1906. OFICEMEN was supported by the Ministry of Industry in Madrid, which for the entire cement sector set the prices and production quotas according to proposal from their six largest industry companies. Since 1980, OFICEMEN is only a normal trade association without pricing functions.
- Madrid, Calle Ruiz de Alarcón, 5: the building of the headquarters of the former Sociedad General Azucarera, Spanish Association of Sugar Manufacturers. This was a cartel, which was founded in 1903 and existed since at least to 1936. Also here, the government had regulatory influence on prices, tariffs and other parameter.

=== Sweden ===
- Malmö: the building of INTERCEMENT/Cembureau, 1937-1960s. Members: European cement manufacturers.

=== Switzerland ===
Switzerland was a location for domestic as well as international cartels.

- Bern: the building of the Swiss Cheese Union, 1914–1999. Members: Swiss cheese traders and makers under control of the Swiss government.
- Geneva: the building of the Phoebus S.A., Compagnie Industrielle pour le développement de l’Eclairage, 1925–1963, rue de la Rôtisserie 2 et 4, residence of a cartel until 1942. Members: the – almost 10 – greatest incandescent light bulb producers around the world.
- Zürich: the building of the Swiss "Aluminium Industrie Aktiengesellschaft" (AIAG), in which from 1901 to 1909 the International aluminium cartel named "Aluminium Association (AA)" was hosted. The AA was the joint sales syndicate for the European Aluminium producers.

=== Slovakia ===
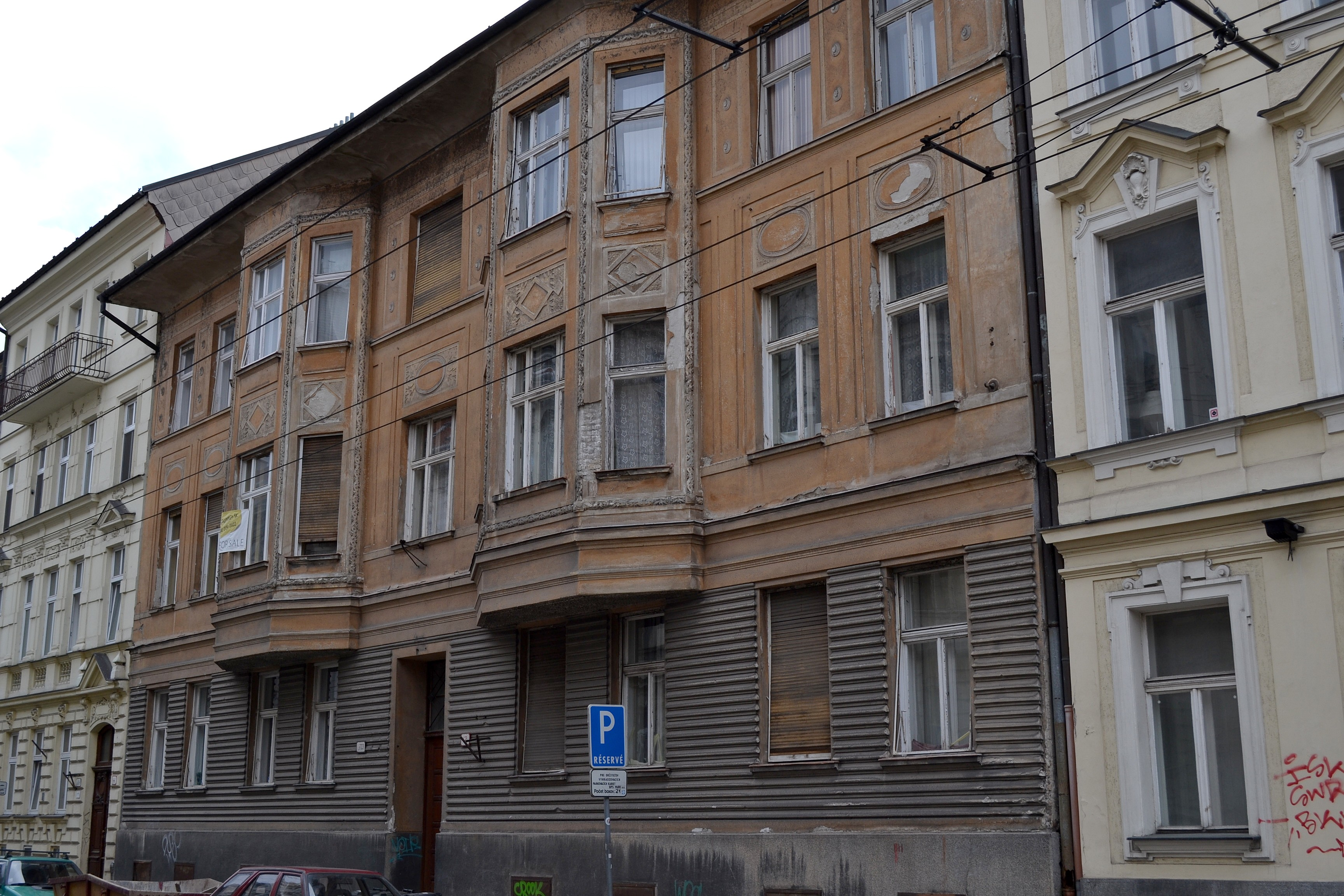
Former Slovak Cement Syndicate, Palisády 42

- ‘‘Bratislava‘‘, Palisády 42: the building of the Slovak Cement Syndicate, 1939–1944, called "Evidence Office of the Slovak Cement Factories Pressburg". Members of the cartel were the Slovak cement works. The Slovak Cement Syndicate was from the end of 1940 to the beginning of 1945, the Slovak cement syndicate was a direct member of the German Cement Federation, i.e., on par with the five German cement syndicates. Until 1939, the Slovak cement plants had been organized in the Czechoslovak cement cartel based in Prague.

=== United States ===
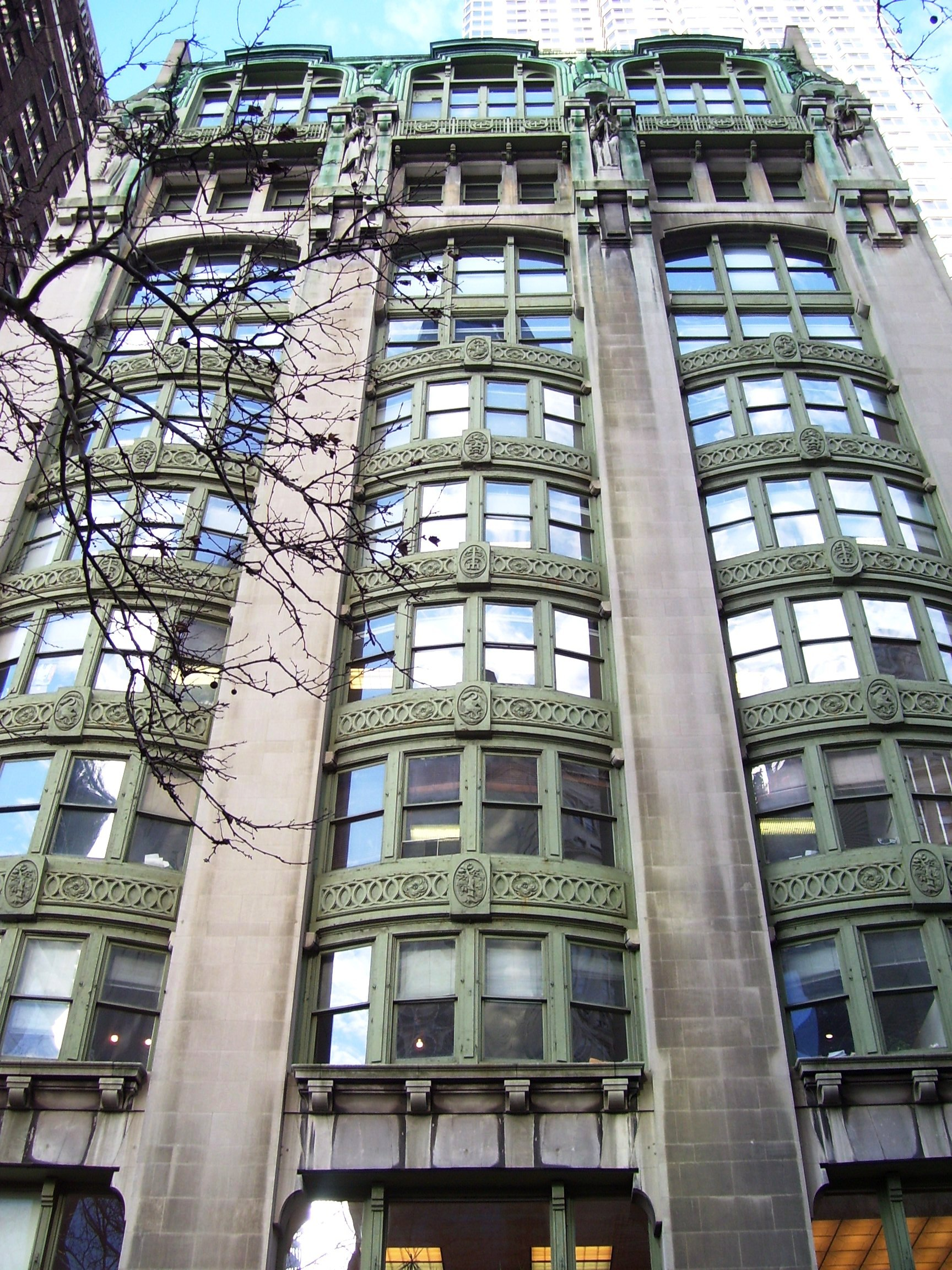
Former American Steel Export Association, Lower Manhattan, 75 West Street

- New York City (Lower Manhattan), 75 West Street, the building in which the Steel Export Association of America was established in 1926. This association was an export cartel, which was exempted from the cartel ban by the renewed antitrust legislation according to the Webb-Pomerene Act of 1918. The Steel Export Association became a participating member of the International Steel Cartel in 1938, which run defunct already in 1939 because of the Second World War. The moved-into building is known as Old New York Evening Post Building. It was erected in 1906–07 for the newspaper of the same name and is decorated in a magnificent Art Nouveau style. In 1926, the Evening Post moved into a larger new building.

== Literature ==
- Compass Čechoslovakei. Finanzielles Jahrbuch (1937/38). Compass-Verlag, Wien.
- Compass [Austria]. Finanzielles Jahrbuch (1938 [1937]). Compass-Verlag, Wien.
- Compass [Austria-Hungary]. Finanzielles Jahrbuch (1913). Compass-Verlag, Wien.
- Adolph Lehmann: Lehmanns Wohnungsanzeiger [of Vienna]. Wiener Adressbuch. Wien (1914–1942).
- Présidence du conseil (France): Les cartels internationaux. Vol. 2. Paris 1956.
- Holm Arno Leonhardt: Kartelltheorie und Internationale Beziehungen. Theoriegeschichtliche Studien, Hildesheim 2013.
- Holm Arno Leonhardt: Regionalwirtschaftliche Organisationskunst. Vorschlag zur Ergänzung des NRW-Antrags zum UNESCO-Welterbe, in: Forum Geschichtskultur Ruhr 2013, p. 41–42.
