= Imperialism =

Extension of rule over foreign nations

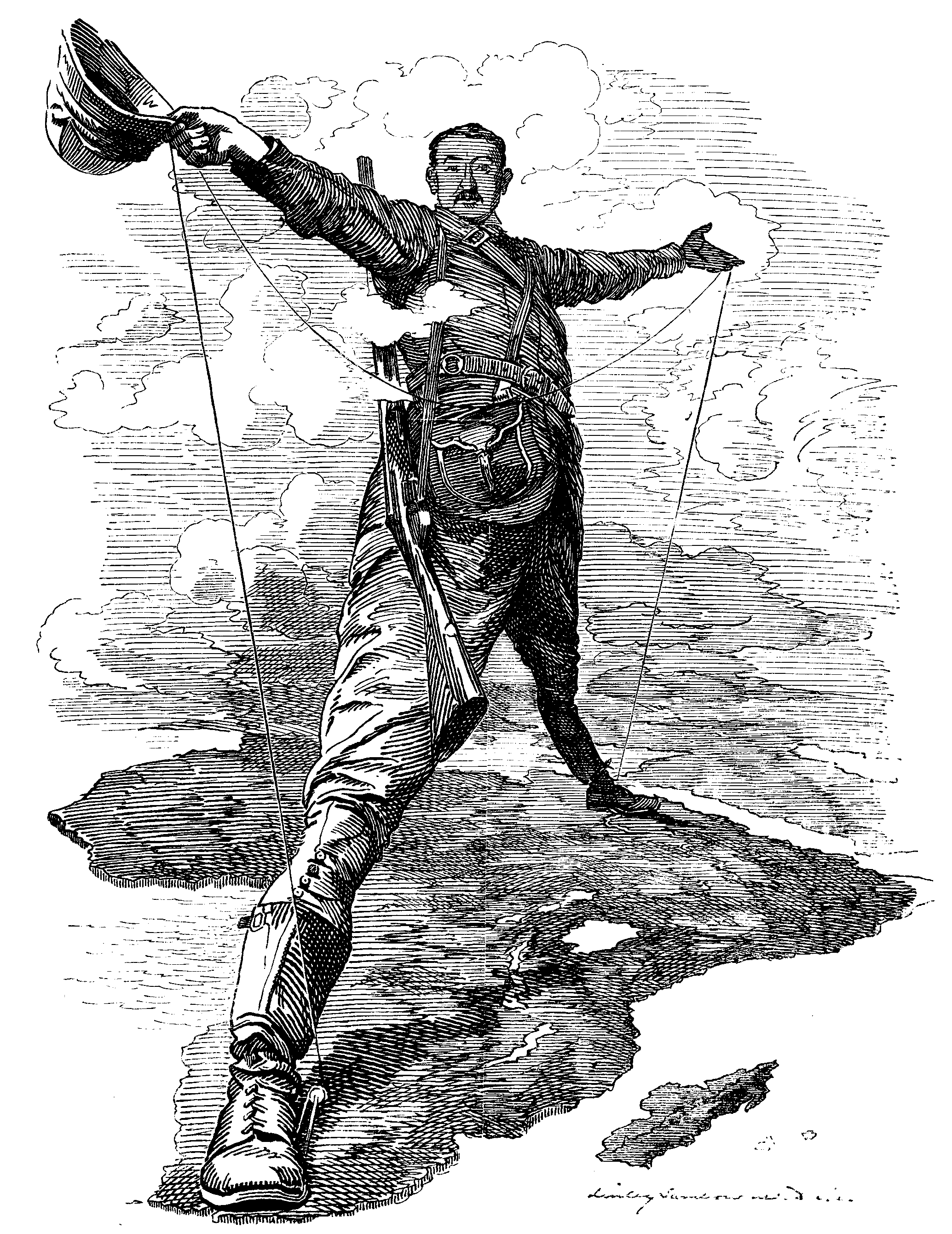
The Rhodes Colossus satirising the Cape to Cairo Railway, a symbol of British imperialism during the Scramble for Africa

Imperialism is the maintaining and extending of power over foreign nations, particularly through expansionism, employing both hard power (military and economic power) and soft power (diplomatic power and cultural imperialism). Imperialism focuses on establishing or maintaining hegemony and a 'more formal empire'.

While related to the concept of colonialism, imperialism is a distinct concept that can apply to other forms of expansion and many forms of government.

Kenneth Waltz suggests that the root cause of imperialism is great power. He explains that "[w]here one finds empires, one notices that they are built by those who have organized themselves and exploited their resources most effectively," adding that "[w]eakness invites control; strength tempts one to exercise it, even if only for the 'good' of other people." According to Vladimir Lenin, imperialist wars are inevitable due to uneven development under capitalism.

== Definition ==
The word imperialism is derived from the Latin word imperium, which means 'to command', 'to be sovereign', or 'to rule'. It was coined in the 19th century to describe Napoleon III's attempts to gain political support by invasion. The term was applied to the British Empire during the 1870s; by the 1880s it had acquired a positive connotation in the West. By the end of the 19th century, the term was used to describe the behavior of empires at all times and places. Hannah Arendt and Joseph Schumpeter defined imperialism as expansion for the sake of expansion.

Hobson, and in 1917, Lenin, attempted to redefine imperialism as the "highest stage of capitalism", as firms exported capital to dominate economically rather than territorially. In 1965 Nkrumah went with calling neocolonialism "the last stage of imperialism", linking it to trade, bases, cultural dominance and the IMF. In 1967 Frank claimed that "unequal exchange" (pricing controlled by the empire) itself reproduced empire. In 1978 Edward Said used the term to describe domination and subordination reflecting an imperial core and a periphery. Said wrote that in addition to European governments using imperialism to strengthen their position while weakening indigenous systems of authority, imperialism also refers to the cultural attitudes accompanying this project, often the idea of exerting a "civilizing" or "improving" influence on peoples in the periphery. Marshall further pushed the term to encompass phenomena such as space development.

=== Colonialism ===
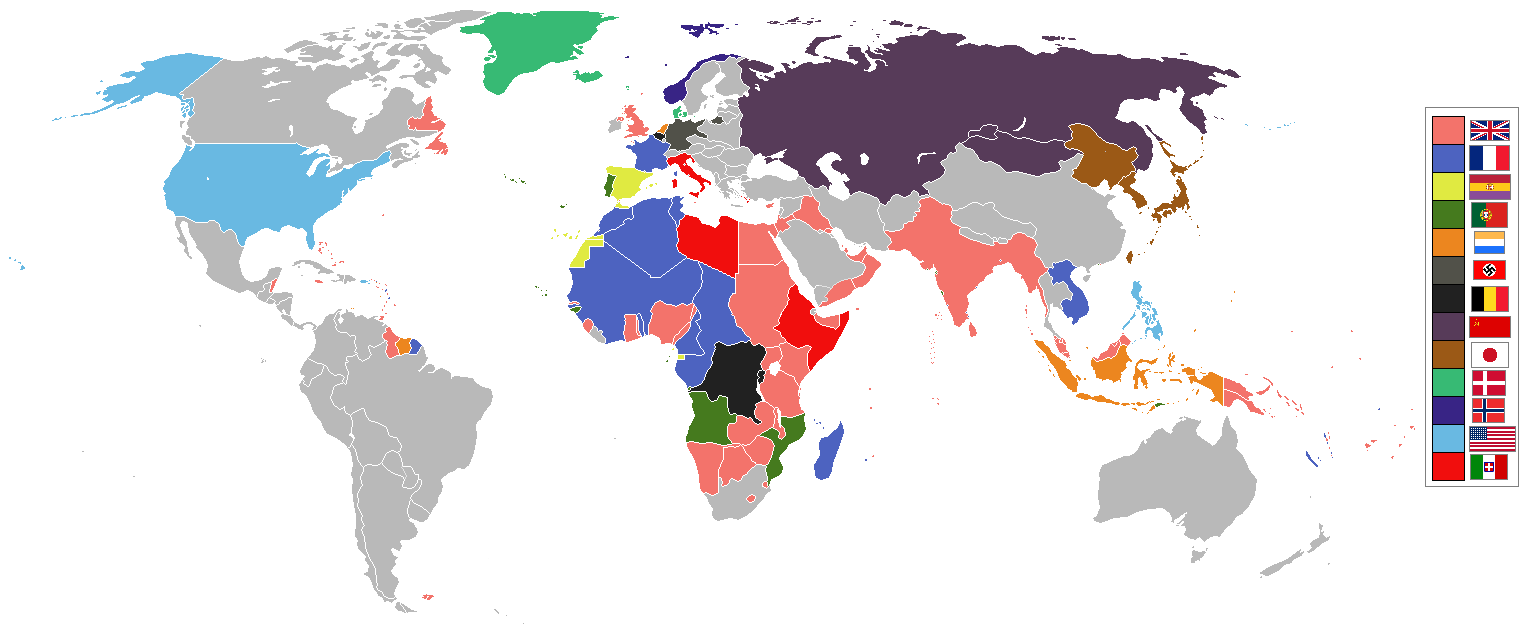
Maximum colonial expansion of the European imperial powers around 1936, during the interwar period.

Imperialism and colonialism have been distinguished by scholars such as Young who wrote that imperialism implements state policy, while colonialism may reflect commercial intentions, although supported by force. Said stated that colonialism implies geographic separation between the colony and the imperial power. He distinguished them, stating, "imperialism involved 'the practice, the theory and the attitudes of a dominating metropolitan center ruling a distant territory', while colonialism refers to the 'settlements on a distant territory.'" Contiguous land empires such as the Russian, Chinese or Ottoman have traditionally been called imperialist, although they also sent populations into their remote territories.

Imperialism and colonialism both involve political and economic advantage over a land and its population. However, scholars sometimes find it difficult to illustrate the difference between the two. According to Painter/Jeffrey, colonialism refers to one country in de facto control of another land (in many cases, colonies had no history as a recognized nation), while imperialism lately refers to less explicit political/economic dominance. Colonialism attempts to develop resources for extraction by the colonizer,although not always successfully (as in Santo Domingo after 1520). Colonies often adopt aspects of their colonists' cultures.

== Age of Imperialism ==
Imperialism has been present and prominent since the beginning of history, and its most intensive phase occurred in the Axial Age. But the concept of the Age of Imperialism refers to the period which pre-dates World War I. While the end of the period is commonly dated to 1914, the date of the beginning of it varies between 1760 and 1870. The latter date makes the Age of Imperialism identical with the New Imperialism. According to Historians Daniel Hedinger and Nadin Heé, the widespread use of the term "Age of Empire" for this specific period reflects a Eurocentric bias in terms of time.

During the Age, European nations, helped by industrialization, intensified the process of colonizing, influencing, and annexing other parts of the world. In the late 19th century, they were joined by the United States and Japan. Other 19th century episodes included the Scramble for Africa and Great Game.

Africa, divided into colonies under multiple European empires, c. 1914 Belgium France Germany Italy Portugal Spain United Kingdom

In the 1970s, the British historians John Gallagher (1919–1980) and Ronald Robinson (1920–1999) argued that European leaders rejected the notion that "imperialism" required formal, legal control by one government over a colonial region. Much more important was informal control of independent areas. According to Wm. Roger Louis, "In their view, historians have been mesmerized by formal empire and maps of the world with regions colored red. The bulk of British emigration, trade, and capital went to areas outside the formal British Empire. Key to their thinking is the idea of empire 'informally if possible and formally if necessary.'" Oron Hale says that Gallagher and Robinson looked at the British involvement in Africa where they "found few capitalists, less capital, and not much pressure from the alleged traditional promoters of colonial expansion. Cabinet decisions to annex or not to annex were made, usually on the basis of political or geopolitical considerations."

Looking at the main empires from 1875 to 1914, there was a mixed record in terms of profitability. At first, planners expected that colonies would provide an excellent captive market for manufactured items. Apart from the Indian subcontinent, this was seldom true. By the 1890s, imperialists saw the economic benefit primarily in the production of inexpensive raw materials to feed the domestic manufacturing sector. Overall, Great Britain extracted profits from India, especially Mughal Bengal, but not from most of the rest of its empire. According to Indian Economist Utsa Patnaik, the scale of the wealth transfer out of India, between 1765 and 1938, was an estimated $45 Trillion. The Netherlands extracted wealth out of the East Indies. Germany and Italy got little trade or raw materials from their empires. France did slightly better. The Belgian Congo was notoriously profitable when it was a capitalistic rubber plantation owned and operated by King Leopold II as a private enterprise. However, scandal after scandal regarding atrocities in the Congo Free State led the international community to force the government of Belgium to take it over in 1908, and it became much less profitable. The Philippines cost the United States much more than expected because of military action against rebels.

Because of the resources which were made available by imperialism, the world's economy grew significantly and it became much more interconnected in the decades before World War I, making the many imperial powers rich and prosperous.

Europe's expansion into territorial imperialism was largely focused on economic growth by collecting resources from colonies, in combination with assuming political control by military and political means. The colonization of India in the mid-18th century offers an example of this focus: there, the "British exploited the political weakness of the Mughal state, and, while military activity was important at various times, the economic and administrative incorporation of local elites was also of crucial significance" for the establishment of control over the subcontinent's resources, markets, and manpower. Although a substantial number of colonies had been designed to provide economic profit and to ship resources to home ports in the 17th and 18th centuries, D. K. Fieldhouse suggests that in the 19th and 20th centuries in places such as Africa and Asia, this idea is not necessarily valid:

Modern empires were not artificially constructed economic machines. The second expansion of Europe was a complex historical process in which political, social and emotional forces in Europe and on the periphery were more influential than calculated imperialism. Individual colonies might serve an economic purpose; collectively no empire had any definable function, economic or otherwise. Empires represented only a particular phase in the ever-changing relationship of Europe with the rest of the world: analogies with industrial systems or investment in real estate were simply misleading.

During this time, European merchants had the ability to "roam the high seas and appropriate surpluses from around the world (sometimes peaceably, sometimes violently) and to concentrate them in Europe".

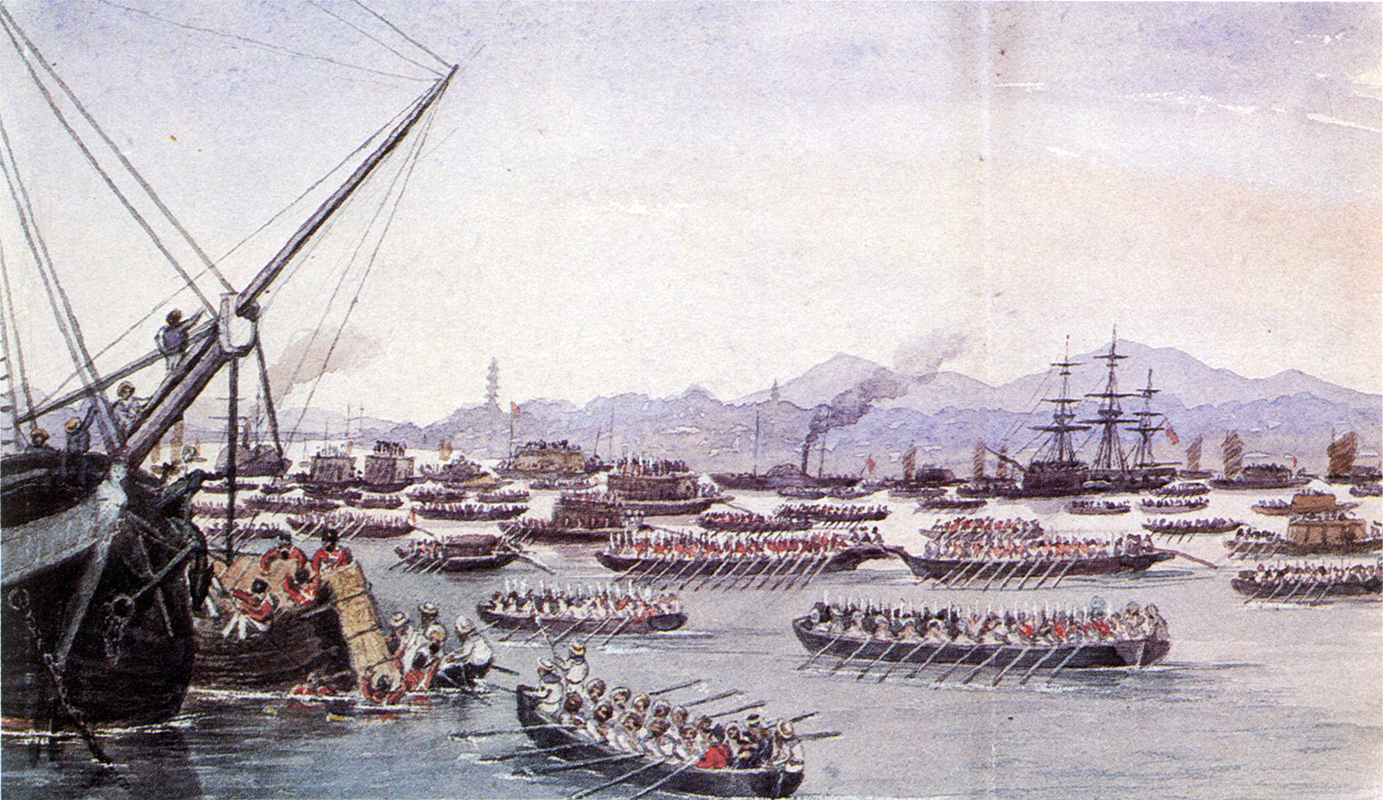
British assault on Canton during the First Opium War, May 1841

European expansion greatly accelerated in the 19th century. To obtain raw materials, Europe expanded imports from other countries and from the colonies. European industrialists sought raw materials such as dyes, cotton, vegetable oils, and metal ores from overseas. Concurrently, industrialization was quickly making Europe the centre of manufacturing and economic growth, driving resource needs.

Communication became much more advanced during European expansion. With the invention of railroads and telegraphs, it became easier to communicate with other countries and to extend the administrative control of a home nation over its colonies. Steam railroads and steam-driven ocean shipping made possible the fast, cheap transport of massive amounts of goods to and from colonies.

Along with advancements in communication, Europe also continued to advance in military technology. European chemists made new explosives that made artillery much more deadly. By the 1880s, the machine gun had become a reliable battlefield weapon. This technology gave European armies an advantage over their opponents, as armies in less-developed countries were still fighting with arrows, swords, and leather shields (e.g. the Zulus in Southern Africa during the Anglo-Zulu War of 1879). Some exceptions of armies that managed to get nearly on par with the European expeditions and standards include the Ethiopian armies at the Battle of Adwa, and the Japanese Imperial Army of Japan, but these still relied heavily on weapons imported from Europe and often on European military advisors.

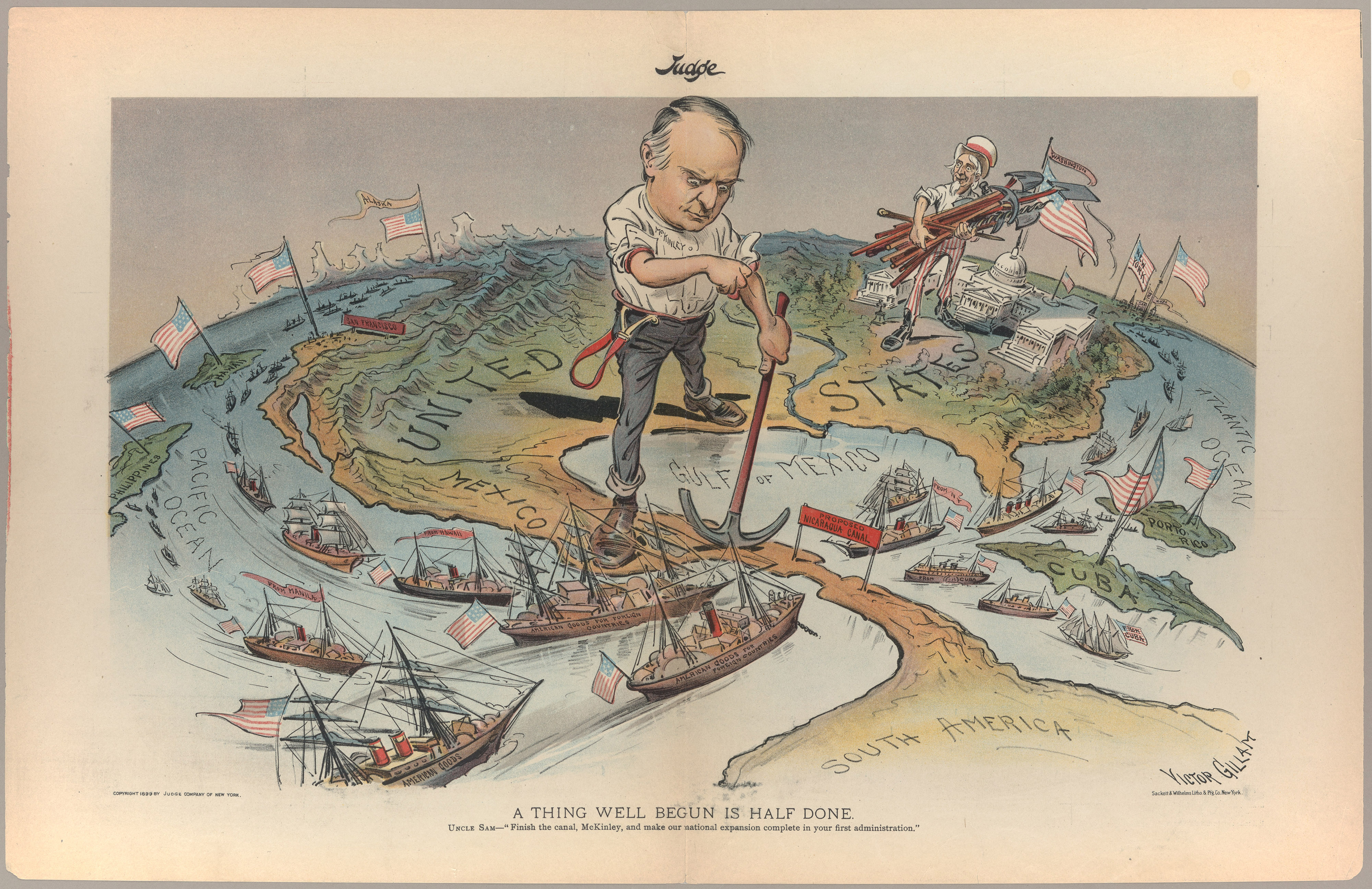
This cartoon reflects the view of Judge magazine regarding America's imperial ambitions following McKinley's quick victory in the Spanish–American War of 1898.

== Theories of imperialism ==
Anglophone academic studies often base their theories regarding imperialism on the British Empire. The term imperialism was originally introduced into English in its present sense in the late 1870s by opponents of the allegedly aggressive and ostentatious imperial policies of British Prime Minister Benjamin Disraeli. Supporters of "imperialism" such as Joseph Chamberlain quickly appropriated the concept. For some, imperialism designated a policy of idealism and philanthropy; others alleged that it was characterized by political self-interest, and a growing number associated it with capitalist greed.

Historians and political theorists have long debated the correlation between capitalism, class, and imperialism. Much of the debate was pioneered by such theorists as John A. Hobson (1858–1940), Joseph Schumpeter (1883–1950), Thorstein Veblen (1857–1929), and Norman Angell (1872–1967). While these non-Marxist writers were at their most prolific before World War I, they remained active in the interwar years. Their combined work informed the study of imperialism and its impact on Europe, and contributed to reflections on the rise of the military-industrial complex in the United States from the 1950s.

In Imperialism: A Study (1902), Hobson developed a highly influential interpretation of imperialism that expanded on his belief that free-enterprise capitalism had a harmful effect on the majority of the population. In Imperialism, he argued that the financing of overseas empires drained money that was needed at home. It was invested abroad because lower wages paid to workers overseas made for higher profits and higher rates of return, compared to domestic wages. So, although domestic wages remained higher, they did not grow nearly as fast as they might otherwise have. Exporting capital, he concluded, put a lid on the growth of domestic wages and the domestic standard of living. Hobson theorized that domestic social reforms could cure the international disease of imperialism by removing its economic foundation, while state intervention through taxation could boost broader consumption, create wealth, and encourage a peaceful, tolerant, multipolar world order.

European Marxists picked up Hobson's ideas incorporated them their own theory of imperialism, most notably in Vladimir Lenin's Imperialism, the Highest Stage of Capitalism (1916). Lenin portrayed imperialism as monopoly capitalism at the global stage, resulting in colonial expansion in order to secure capitalist economic growth and profits. Later Marxist theoreticians echo this conception of imperialism as a structural feature of capitalism, which explained the world wars as the battle between imperialists for control of external markets. Lenin's treatise became a standard textbook that flourished until the collapse of the Soviet Union in 1989–91.

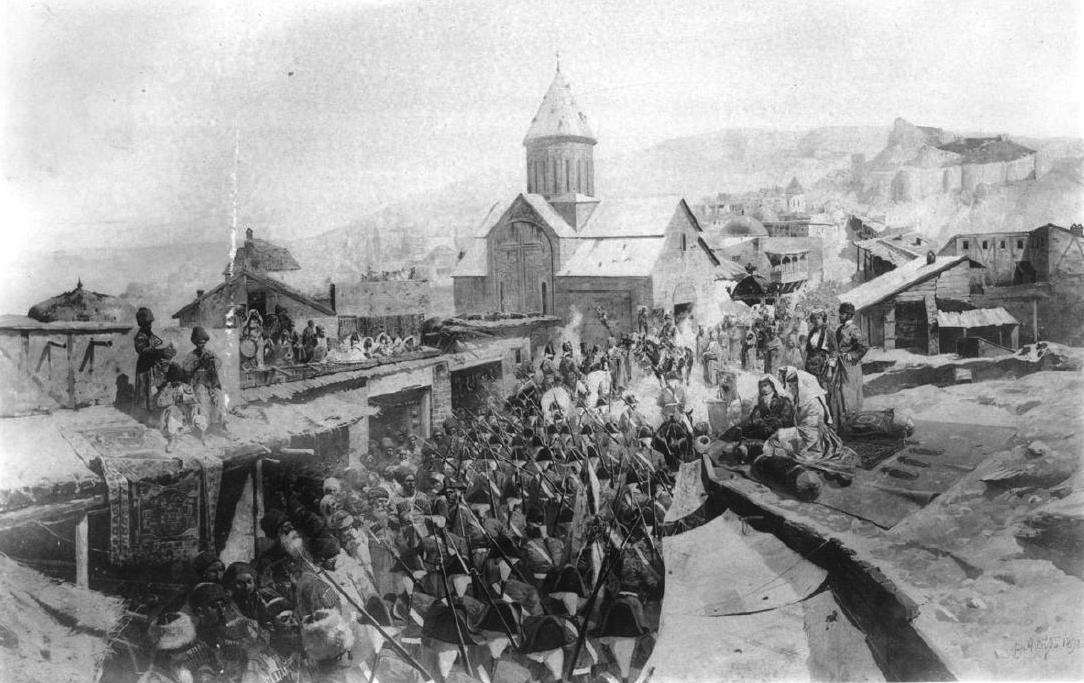
Entrance of the Russian troops in Tiflis, 26 November 1799, by Franz Roubaud, 1886

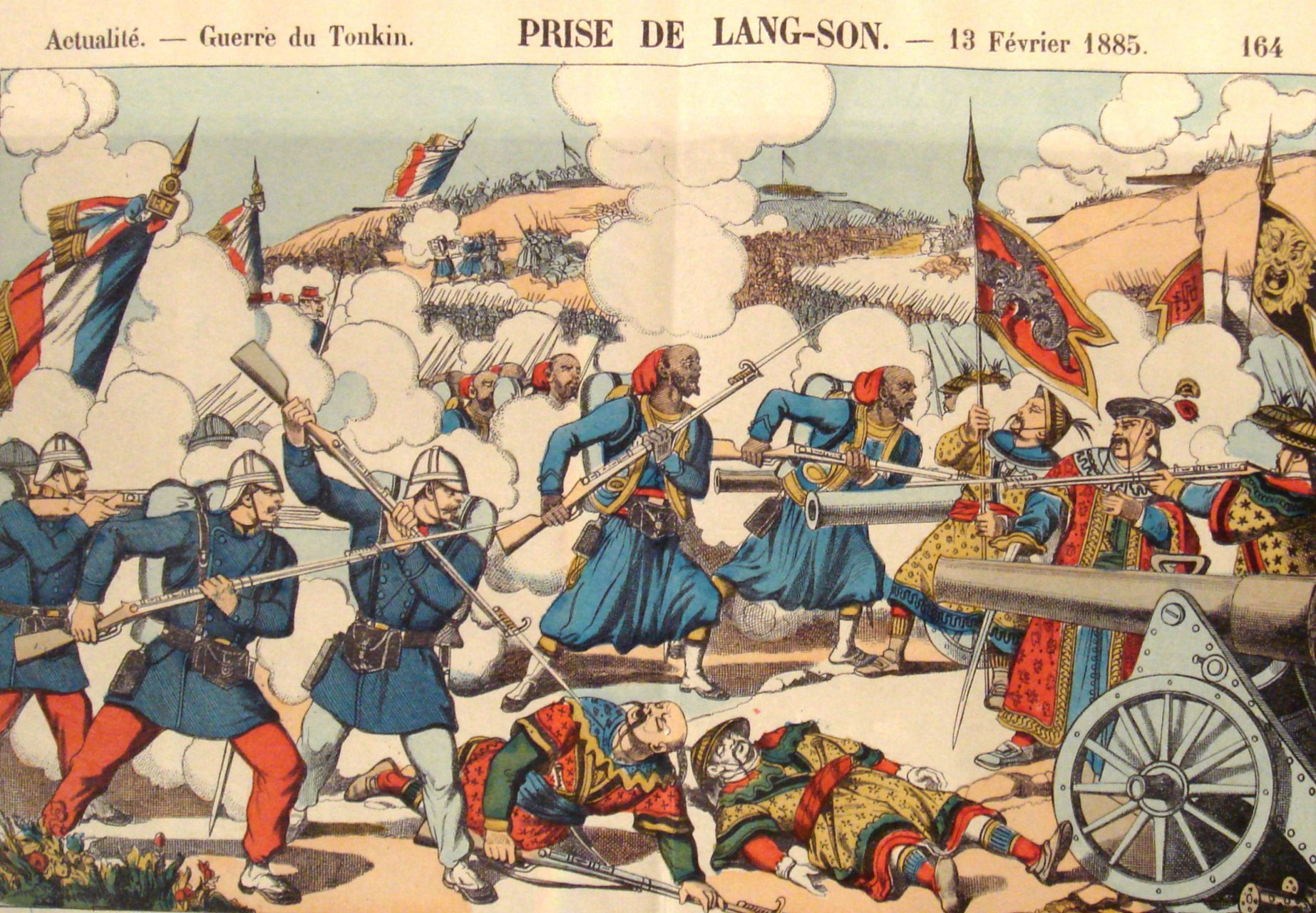
The capture of Lạng Sơn during the French conquest of Vietnam in 1885

Some theoreticians on the non-Communist left have emphasized the structural or systemic character of "imperialism". Such writers have expanded the period associated with the term so that it now designates neither a policy, nor a short space of decades in the late 19th century, but a world system extending over a period of centuries, often going back to Colonization and, in some accounts, to the Crusades. As the application of the term has expanded, its meaning has shifted along five distinct but often parallel axes: the moral, the economic, the systemic, the cultural, and the temporal. Those changes reflect—among other shifts in sensibility—a growing unease, even great distaste, with the pervasiveness of such power, specifically, Western power.

By the 1970s, historians such as David K. Fieldhouse, David Landes, and Oron Hale argued that the Hobsonian conception of imperialism was no longer supported. They advocated that modern imperialism was primarily a political product caused by the national mass hysteria rather than by the capitalists. The British experience failed to support it.

Walter Rodney, in his 1972 How Europe Underdeveloped Africa, proposes the idea that imperialism is a phase of capitalism "in which Western European capitalist countries, the US, and Japan established political, economic, military and cultural hegemony over other parts of the world which were initially at a lower level and therefore could not resist domination." As a result, Imperialism "for many years embraced the whole world – one part being the exploiters and the other the exploited, one part being dominated and the other acting as overlords, one part making policy and the other being dependent."

== Justification and issues ==
=== Expansionism ===
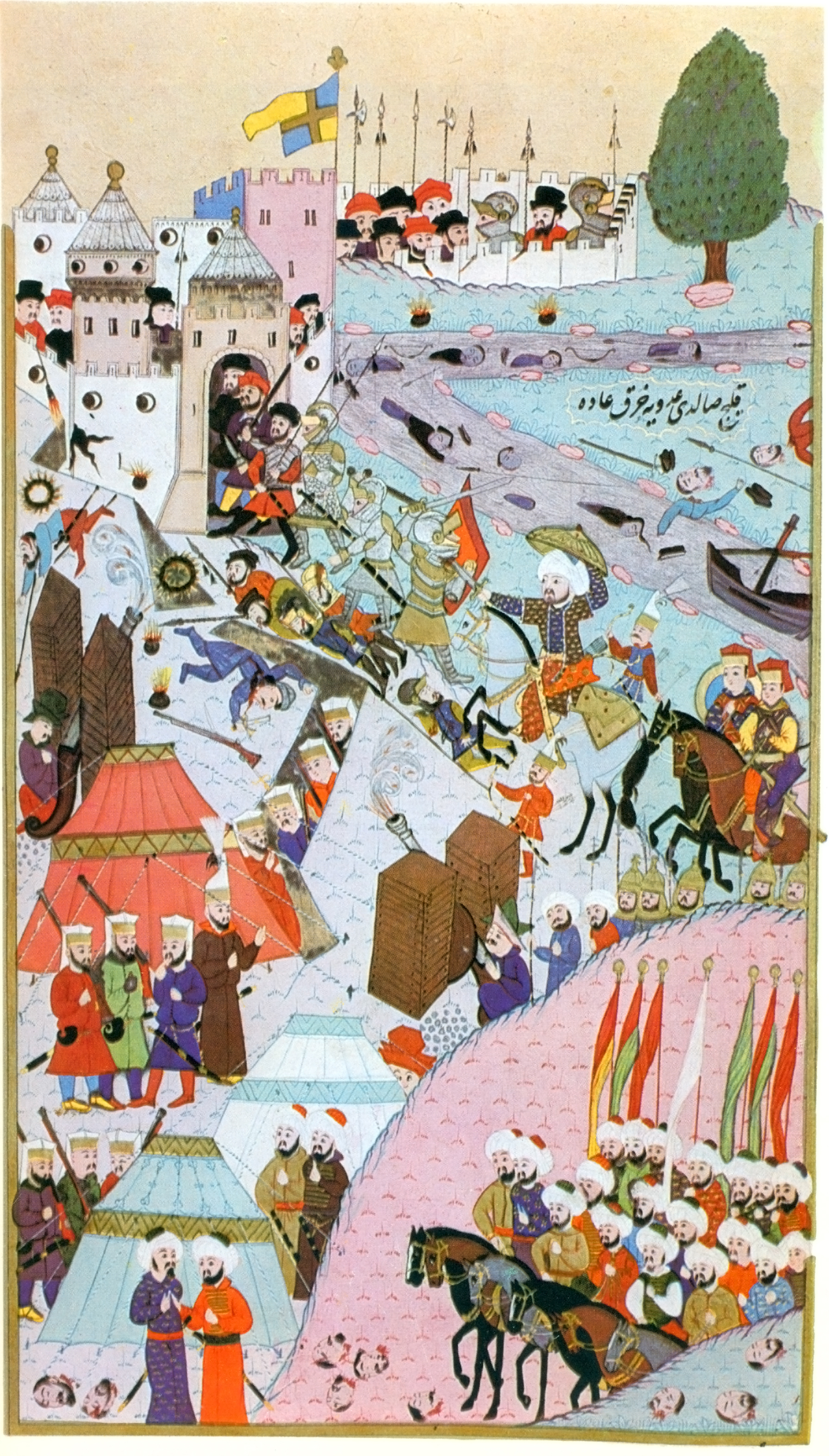
Ottoman wars in Europe

Imperialism was common in the form of expansionism through vassalage, irredentism, and conquest.

=== Orientalism and imaginative geography ===
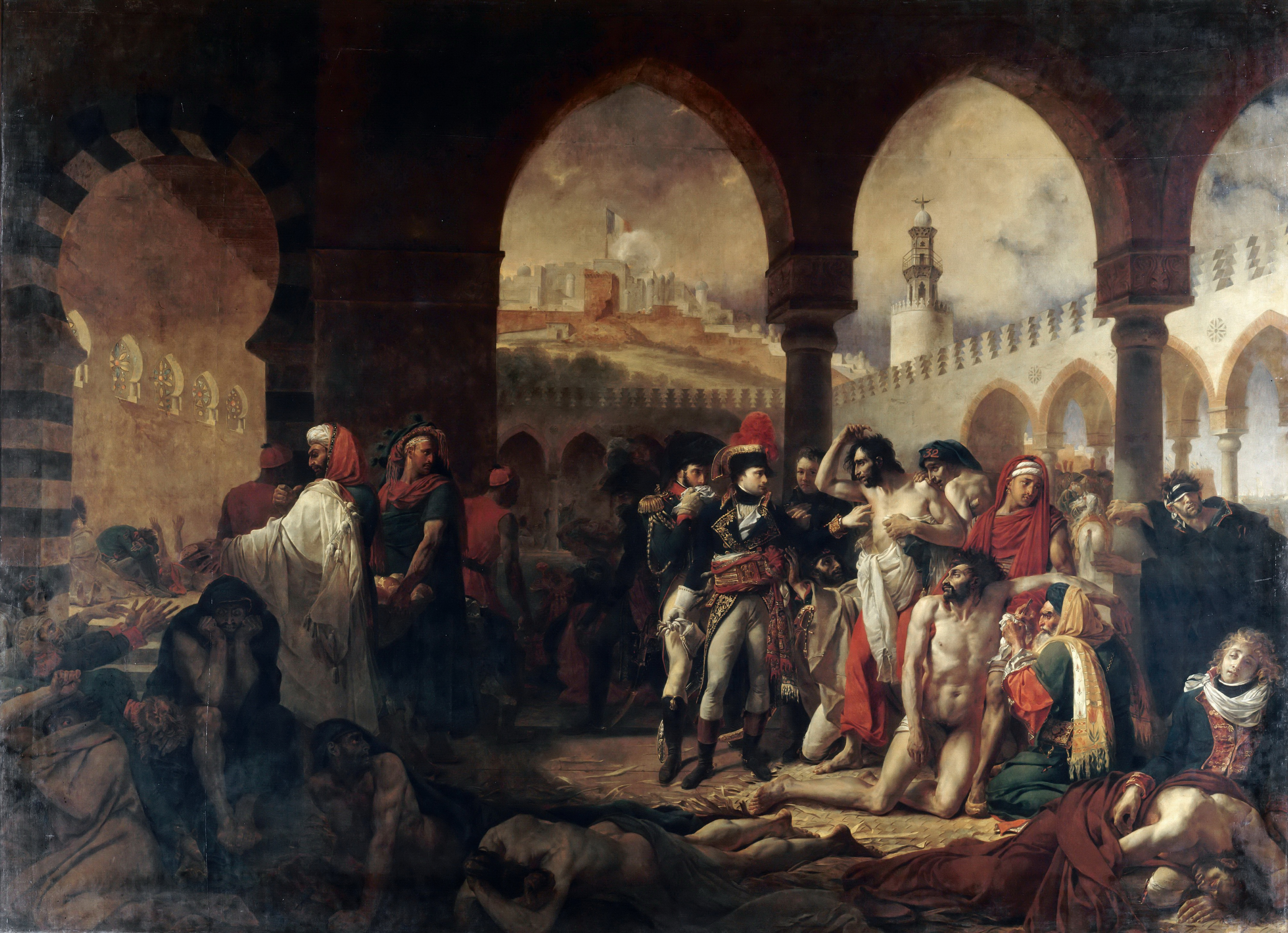
Bonaparte Visiting the Plague Victims of Jaffa (Antoine-Jean Gros, 1804)

Imperial control, territorial and cultural, is justified through discourses about the imperialists' understanding of different spaces. Conceptually, imagined geographies explain the limitations of the imperialist understanding of the societies of the different spaces inhabited by the non–European Other.

In Orientalism (1978), Edward Said said that the West developed the concept of The Orient—an imagined geography of the Eastern world—which functions as an essentializing discourse that represents neither the ethnic diversity nor the social reality of the Eastern world. That by reducing the East into cultural essences, the imperial discourse uses place-based identities to create cultural difference and psychologic distance between "We, the West" and "They, the East" and between "Here, in the West" and "There, in the East".

That cultural differentiation was especially noticeable in the books and paintings of early Oriental studies, the European examinations of the Orient, which misrepresented the East as irrational and backward, the opposite of the rational and progressive West. Defining the East as a negative vision of the Western world, as its inferior, not only increased the sense-of-self of the West, but also was a way of ordering the East, and making it known to the West, so that it could be dominated and controlled. Therefore, Orientalism was the ideological justification of early Western imperialism—a body of knowledge and ideas that rationalized social, cultural, political, and economic control of other, non-white peoples.

=== Cartography ===
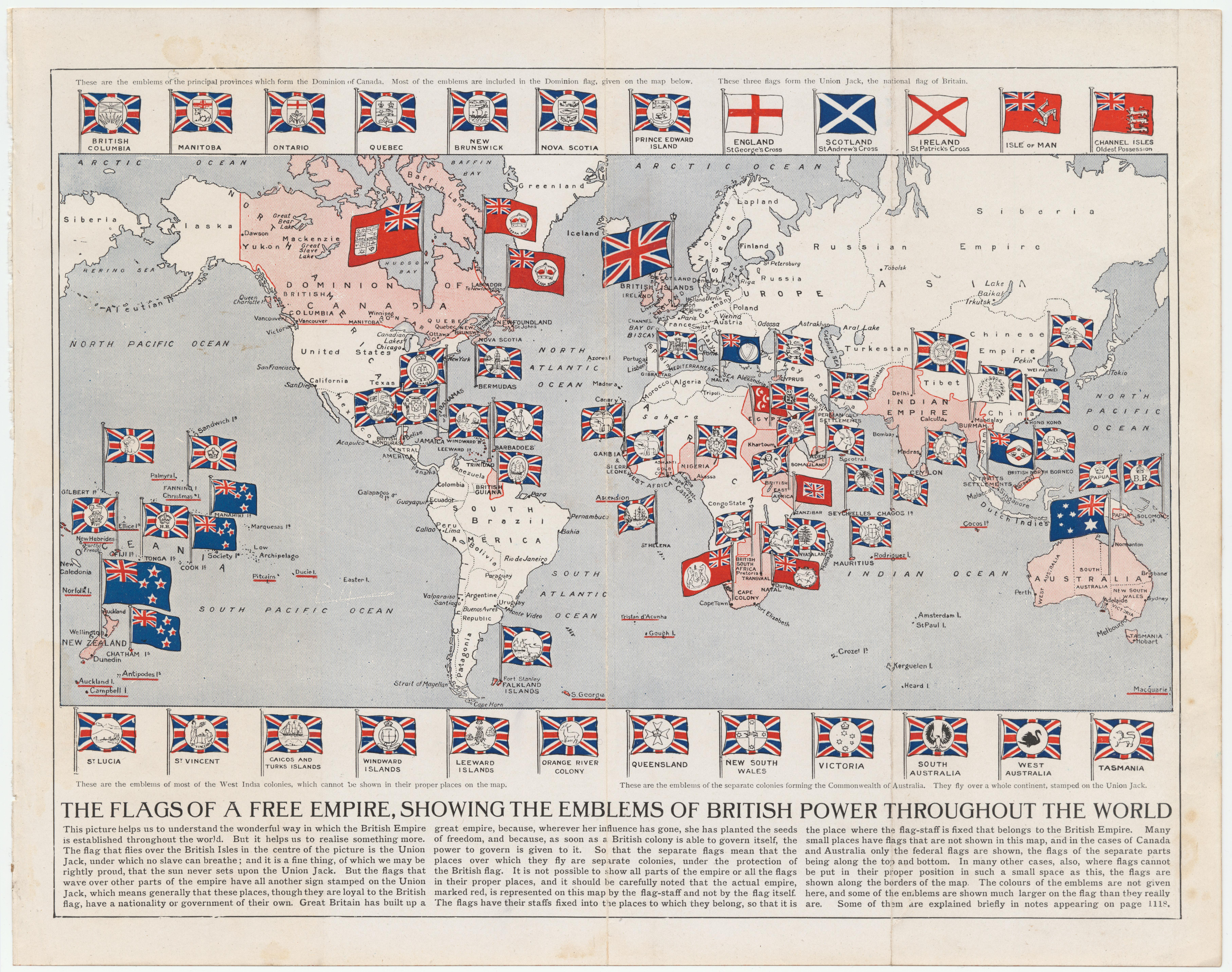
By displaying oversized flags of British possessions, this map artificially increases the apparent influence and presence of the British Empire.

One of the main tools used by imperialists was cartography. Cartography is "the art, science and technology of making maps" but this definition is problematic. It implies that maps are objective representations of the world when in reality they serve political means. For Harley, maps serve as an example of Foucault's power and knowledge concept.

To better illustrate this idea, Bassett focuses his analysis of the role of 19th-century maps during the "Scramble for Africa". He states that maps "contributed to empire by promoting, assisting, and legitimizing the extension of French and British power into West Africa". During his analysis of 19th-century cartographic techniques, he highlights the use of blank space to denote unknown or unexplored territory. This provided incentives for imperial and colonial powers to obtain "information to fill in blank spaces on contemporary maps".

Although cartographic processes advanced through imperialism, further analysis of their progress reveals many biases linked to eurocentrism. According to Bassett, "[n]ineteenth-century explorers commonly requested Africans to sketch maps of unknown areas on the ground. Many of those maps were highly regarded for their accuracy" but were not printed in Europe unless Europeans verified them.

=== Cultural imperialism ===
The concept of cultural imperialism refers to the cultural influence of one dominant culture over others, i.e. a form of soft power, which changes the moral, cultural, and societal worldview of the subordinate culture. This means more than just "foreign" music, television or film becoming popular with young people; rather that a populace changes its own expectations of life, desiring for their own country to become more like the foreign country depicted. For example, depictions of opulent American lifestyles in the soap opera Dallas during the Cold War changed the expectations of Romanians; a more recent example is the influence of smuggled South Korean drama-series in North Korea. The importance of soft power is not lost on authoritarian regimes, which may oppose such influence with bans on foreign popular culture, control of the internet and of unauthorized satellite dishes, etc. Nor is such a usage of culture recent – as part of Roman imperialism, local elites would be exposed to the benefits and luxuries of Roman culture and lifestyle, with the aim that they would then become willing participants.

Imperialism has been subject to moral or immoral censure by its critics, and thus the term "imperialism" is frequently used in international propaganda as a pejorative for expansionist and aggressive foreign policy.

=== Religious imperialism ===
Aspects of imperialism motivated by religious supremacism can be described as religious imperialism. Religious imperialism involves the extension of religious authority modeled on colonial power structures. In 1932, scholar Clifford Manshardt defined religious imperialism as "the attitude of mind which says that that which I believe should be believed by everyone else; and which is willing to undergo hardships and make sacrifices for the extension of that belief."

=== Psychological imperialism ===
An empire mentality may build on and bolster views contrasting "primitive" and "advanced" peoples and cultures, thus justifying and encouraging imperialist practices among participants. Associated psychological tropes include the White Man's Burden and the idea of civilizing mission (French: mission civilatrice).

=== Social imperialism ===
The political concept social imperialism is a Marxist expression first used in the early 20th century by Lenin as "socialist in words, imperialist in deeds" describing the Fabian Society and other socialist organizations. Later, in a split with the Soviet Union, Mao Zedong criticized its leaders as social imperialists.

=== Social Darwinism ===
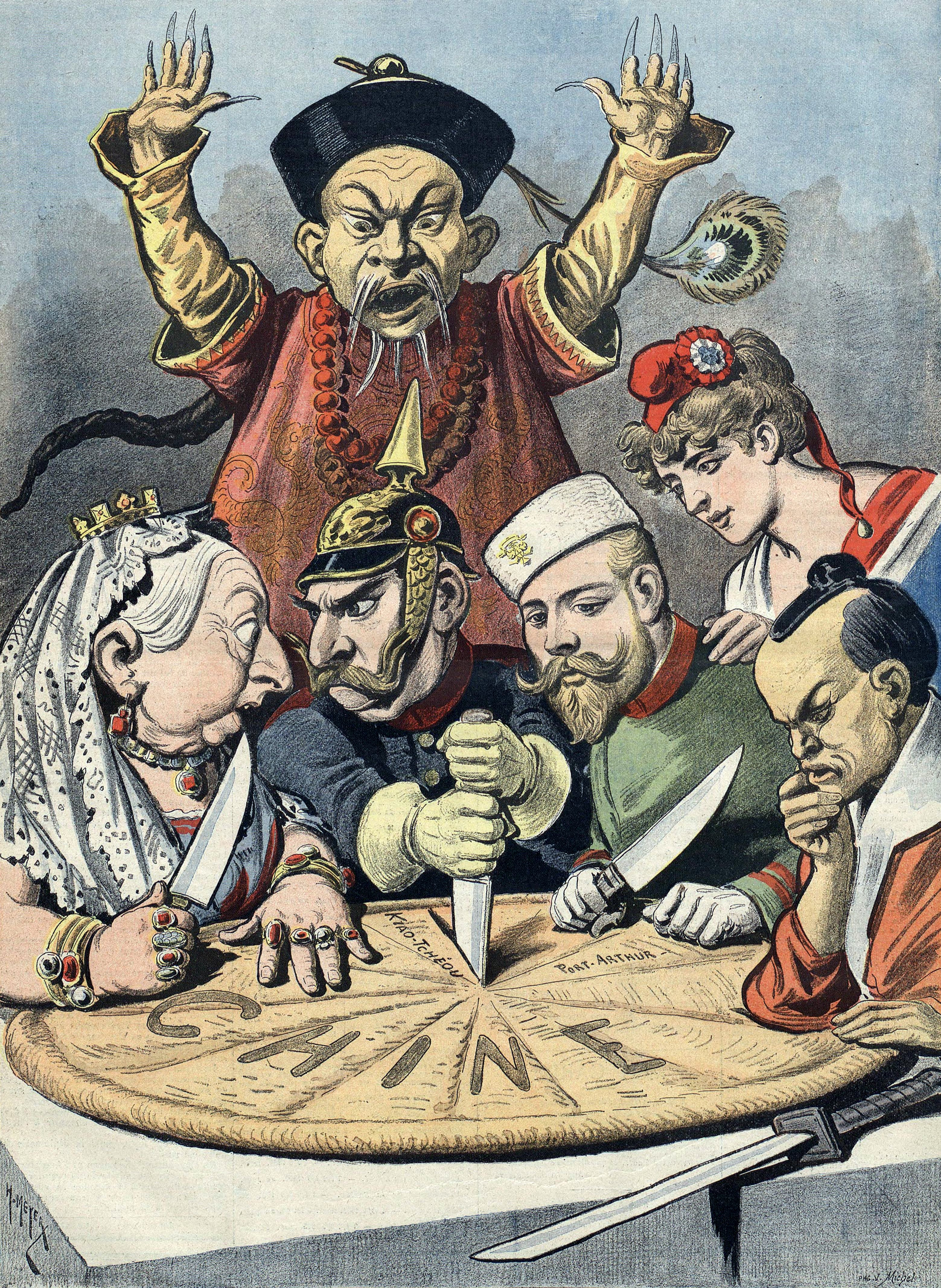
A French political cartoon depicting a shocked mandarin in Manchu robe in the back, with Queen Victoria (British Empire), Wilhelm II (German Empire), Nicholas II (Russian Empire), Marianne (French Third Republic), and a samurai (Empire of Japan) stabbing into a king cake with Chine ("China" in French) written on it. A portrayal of New Imperialism and its effects on China.

Stephen Howe has summarized his view on the beneficial effects of the colonial empires:

At least some of the great modern empires—the British, French, Austro-Hungarian, Russian, and even the Ottoman—have virtues that have been too readily forgotten. They provided stability, security, and legal order for their subjects. They constrained, and at their best, tried to transcend, the potentially savage ethnic or religious antagonisms among the peoples. And the aristocracies which ruled most of them were often far more liberal, humane, and cosmopolitan than their supposedly ever more democratic successors.

A controversial aspect of imperialism is the defense and justification of empire-building based on seemingly rational grounds. In ancient China, Tianxia denoted the lands, space, and area divinely appointed to the Emperor by universal and well-defined principles of order. The center of this land was directly apportioned to the Imperial court, forming the center of a world view that centered on the Imperial court and went concentrically outward to major and minor officials and then the common citizens, tributary states, and finally ending with the fringe "barbarians". Tianxia's idea of hierarchy gave Chinese a privileged position and was justified through the promise of order and peace.

The purportedly scientific nature of "Social Darwinism" and a theory of races formed a supposedly rational justification for imperialism. Under this doctrine, the French politician Jules Ferry could declare in 1883 that "Superior races have a right, because they have a duty. They have the duty to civilize the inferior races." J. A. Hobson identifies this justification on general grounds as: "It is desirable that the earth should be peopled, governed, and developed, as far as possible, by the races which can do this work best, i.e. by the races of highest 'social efficiency'". The Royal Geographical Society of London and other geographical societies in Europe had great influence and were able to fund travelers who would come back with tales of their discoveries. These societies also served as a space for travellers to share these stories. Political geographers such as Friedrich Ratzel of Germany and Halford Mackinder of Britain also supported imperialism. Ratzel believed expansion was necessary for a state's survival and this argument dominated the discipline of geopolitics for decades. British imperialism in some sparsely-inhabited regions applied a principle now termed Terra nullius (Latin expression which stems from Roman law meaning 'no man's land'). The British settlement in Australia in the 18th century was arguably premised on terra nullius, as its settlers considered it unused by its original inhabitants. The rhetoric of colonizers being racially superior appears still to have its impact. For example, throughout Latin America "whiteness" is still prized today and various forms of blanqueamiento (whitening) are common.

Imperial peripheries benefited from economic efficiency improved through the building of roads, other infrastructure and introduction of new technologies. Herbert Lüthy notes that ex-colonial peoples themselves show no desire to undo the basic effects of this process. Hence moral self-criticism in respect of the colonial past is out of place.

=== Environmental determinism ===
The concept of environmental determinism served as a moral justification for the domination of certain territories and peoples. The environmental determinist school of thought held that the environment in which certain people lived determined those persons' behaviours; and thus validated their domination. Some geographic scholars under colonizing empires divided the world into climatic zones. These scholars believed that Northern Europe and the Mid-Atlantic temperate climate produced a hard-working, moral, and upstanding human being. In contrast, tropical climates allegedly yielded lazy attitudes, sexual promiscuity, exotic culture, and moral degeneracy. The tropical peoples were believed to be "less civilized" and in need of European guidance, therefore justifying colonial control as a civilizing mission. For instance, American geographer Ellen Churchill Semple argued that even though human beings originated in the tropics they were only able to become fully human in the temperate zone. Across the three major waves of European colonialism (the first in the Americas, the second in Asia and the last in Africa), environmental determinism served to place categorically indigenous people in a racial hierarchy. Tropicality can be paralleled with Edward Said's Orientalism as the west's construction of the east as the "other". According to Said, orientalism allowed Europe to establish itself as the superior and the norm, which justified its dominance over the essentialized Orient. Orientalism is a view of a people based on their geographical location.

== Historical examples ==
Diachronic map of the main empires of the modern era (1492–1945)

=== Arab ===
Arabization or Arabicization (Arabic: تعريب, romanized: taʻrīb) is a sociological process of cultural change in which a non-Arab society becomes Arab, meaning it either directly adopts, is forced to accept, or becomes strongly influenced by the Arabic language, culture, literature, art, music, and ethnic identity as well as other socio-cultural factors. It is a specific form of cultural assimilation that often includes a language shift or linguistic imperialism. The term applies not only to cultures, but also to individuals, as they acclimate to Arab culture and become "Arabized". Arabization took place after the Muslim conquest of the Middle East and North Africa, as well as during the more recent Arab nationalist policies toward non-Arabic speaking minorities in modern Arab states, such as Algeria, Iraq, Syria, Egypt, Bahrain, and Sudan.

=== Belgian ===
The Kingdom of Belgium controlled several territories and concessions during the colonial era, principally the Belgian Congo (modern DR Congo) from 1908 to 1960, Ruanda-Urundi (modern Rwanda and Burundi) from 1922 to 1962, and the Lado Enclave (which was made up of a small portion of the modern Central Equatoria province in South Sudan) from 1894 to 1910. It was also a co-administrator of the Tangier International Zone in Morocco.

=== Brazilian ===
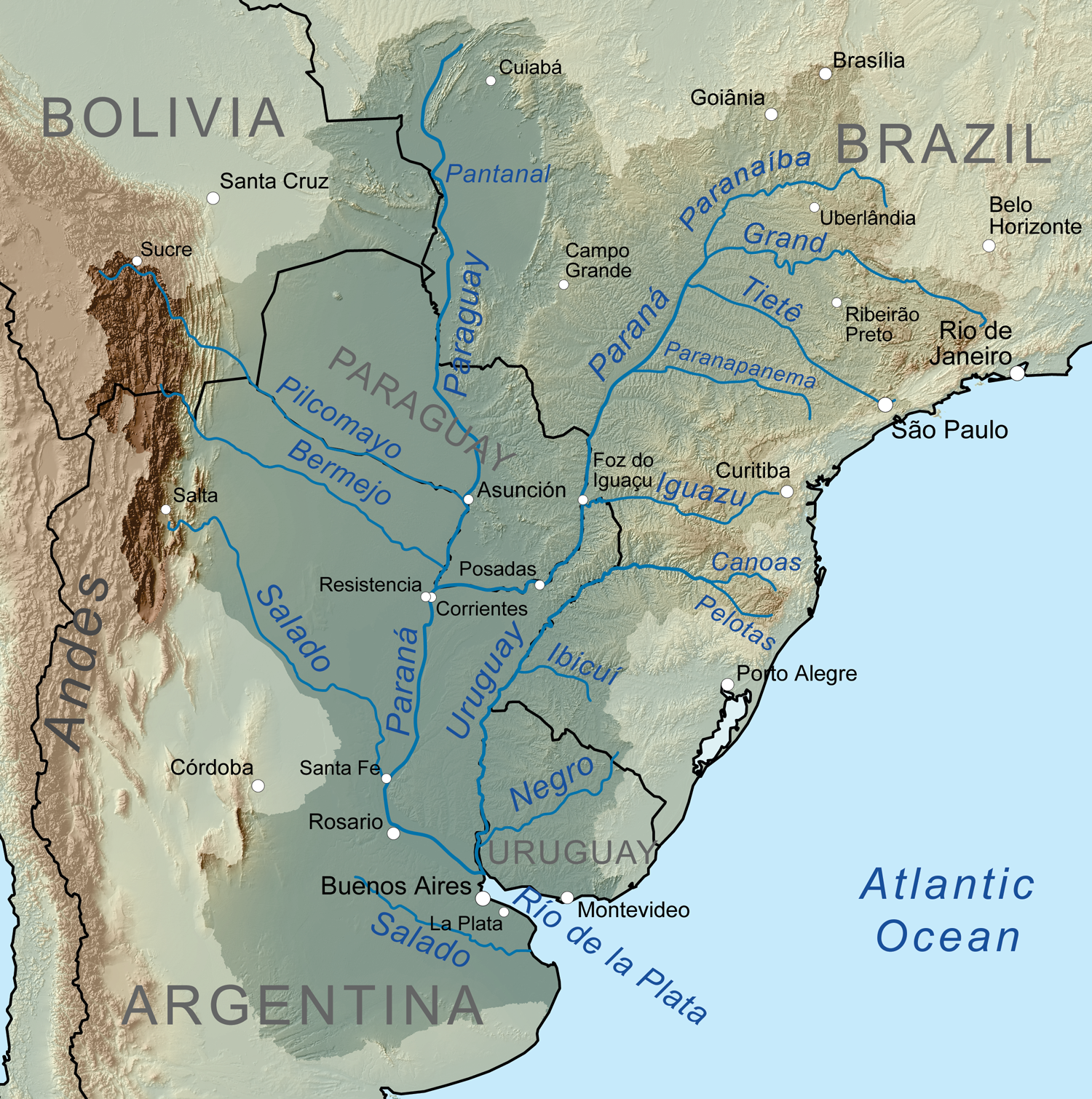
Map of the Río de la Plata Basin

The Platine Wars is a term used by Brazilian historiography to refer to a series of diplomatic and military conflicts along the 19th century between the Empire of Brazil and neighbouring countries in the Río de la Plata Basin.

These conflicts began in 1816, due to the intention of Prince Regent John of annexing the Banda Oriental (modern-day Uruguay) and pushing the Brazilian border to the left bank of the River Plate estuary.

- Portuguese invasion of the Banda Oriental - 1811–1812
- Luso-Brazilian conquest of the Banda Oriental - 1816–1820
- Cisplatine War - 1825–1828
- Uruguayan Civil War - 1839–1851
- Platine War - 1851–1852
- Uruguayan War - 1864–1865
- Paraguayan War - 1864–1870

=== British ===
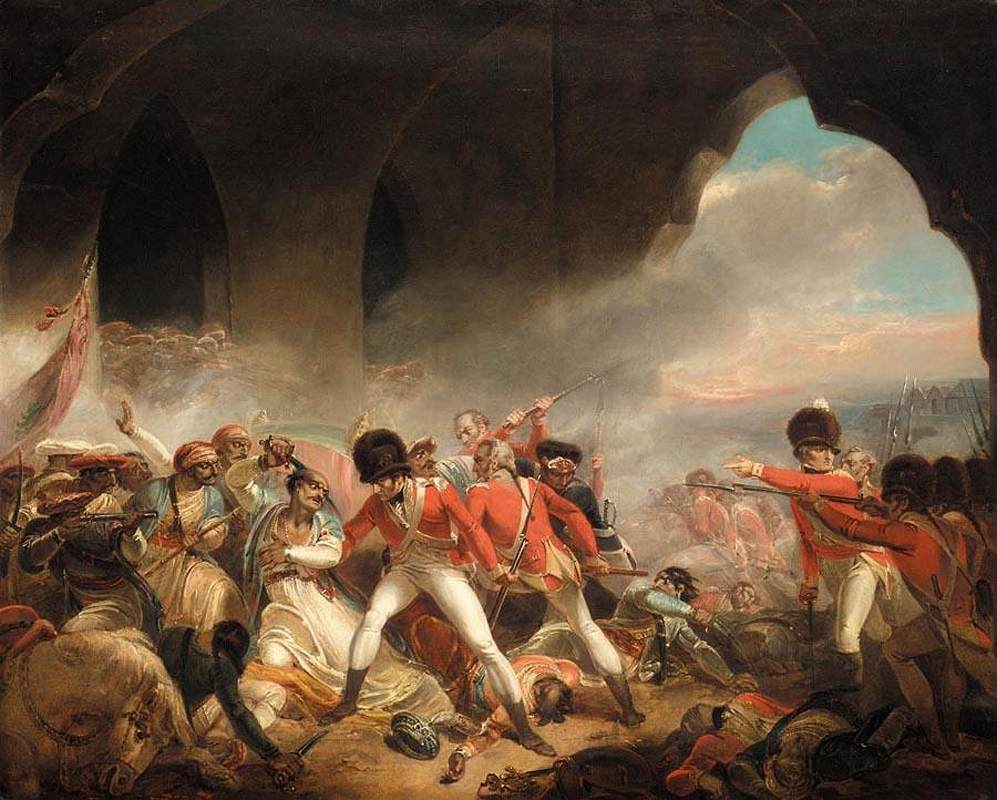
The Last Effort and Fall of Tippoo Sultaun by Henry Singleton, c.1800. Tipu, Sultan of Mysore, an ally of Napoleone Bonaparte, confronted British East India Company forces at the Siege of Srirangapatna, where he was killed.

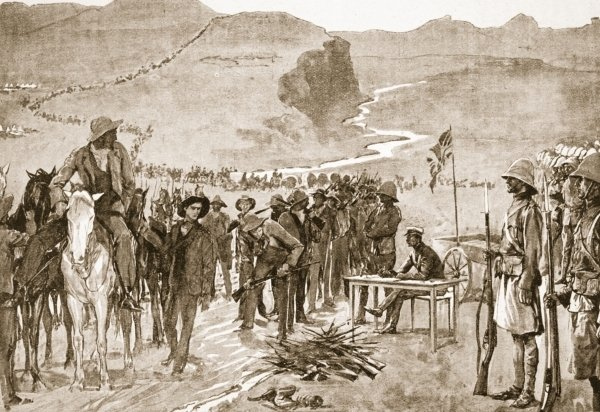
The result of the Boer Wars was the annexation of the Boer Republics to the British Empire in 1902.

==== England ====
England's imperialist ambitions can be seen as early as the 16th century as the Tudor conquest of Ireland began in the 1530s. In 1599 the British East India Company was established and was chartered by Queen Elizabeth in the following year. With the establishment of trading posts in India, the British were able to maintain strength relative to other empires such as the Portuguese who already had set up trading posts in India.

==== Scotland ====
Between 1621 and 1699, the Kingdom of Scotland authorised several colonies in the Americas. Most of these colonies were either closed down or collapsed quickly for various reasons.

==== United Kingdom ====
Under the Acts of Union 1707, the English and Scottish kingdoms were merged, and their colonies collectively became subject to Great Britain (also known as the United Kingdom). The empire Great Britain would go on to found was the largest empire that the world has ever seen both in terms of landmass and population. Its power, both military and economic, remained unmatched for a few decades.

In 1767, the Anglo-Mysore Wars and other political activity caused exploitation of the East India Company causing the plundering of the local economy, almost bringing the company into bankruptcy. By the year 1670 Britain's imperialist ambitions were well off as she had colonies in Virginia, Massachusetts, Bermuda, Honduras, Antigua, Barbados, Jamaica and Nova Scotia. Due to the vast imperialist ambitions of European countries, Britain had several clashes with France. This competition was evident in the colonization of what is now known as Canada. John Cabot claimed Newfoundland for the British while the French established colonies along the St. Lawrence River and claiming it as "New France". Britain continued to expand by colonizing countries such as New Zealand and Australia, both of which were not empty land as they had their own locals and cultures. Britain's nationalistic movements were evident with the creation of the commonwealth countries where there was a shared nature of national identity.

Following the proto-industrialization, the "First" British Empire was based on mercantilism, and involved colonies and holdings primarily in North America, the Caribbean, and India. Its growth was reversed by the loss of the American colonies in 1776. Britain made compensating gains in India, Australia, and in constructing an informal economic empire through control of trade and finance in Latin America after the independence of Spanish and Portuguese colonies in about 1820. By the 1840s, the United Kingdom had adopted a highly successful policy of free trade that gave it dominance in the trade of much of the world. After losing its first Empire to the Americans, Britain then turned its attention towards Asia, Africa, and the Pacific. Following the defeat of Napoleonic France in 1815, the United Kingdom enjoyed a century of almost unchallenged dominance and expanded its imperial holdings around the globe. Unchallenged at sea, British dominance was later described as Pax Britannica ("British Peace"), a period of relative peace in Europe and the world (1815–1914) during which the British Empire became the global hegemon and adopted the role of global policeman. However, this peace was mostly a perceived one from Europe, and the period was still an almost uninterrupted series of colonial wars and disputes. The British Conquest of India, its intervention against Mehemet Ali, the Anglo-Burmese Wars, the Crimean War, the Opium Wars and the Scramble for Africa to name the most notable conflicts mobilised ample military means to press Britain's lead in the global conquest Europe led across the century.

In the early 19th century, the Industrial Revolution began to transform Britain; by the time of the Great Exhibition in 1851 the country was described as the "workshop of the world". The British Empire expanded to include India, large parts of Africa and many other territories throughout the world. Alongside the formal control it exerted over its own colonies, British dominance of much of world trade meant that it effectively controlled the economies of many regions, such as Asia and Latin America. Domestically, political attitudes favoured free trade and laissez-faire policies and a gradual widening of the voting franchise. During this century, the population increased at a dramatic rate, accompanied by rapid urbanisation, causing significant social and economic stresses. To seek new markets and sources of raw materials, the Conservative Party under Disraeli launched a period of imperialist expansion in Egypt, South Africa, and elsewhere. Canada, Australia, and New Zealand became self-governing dominions.

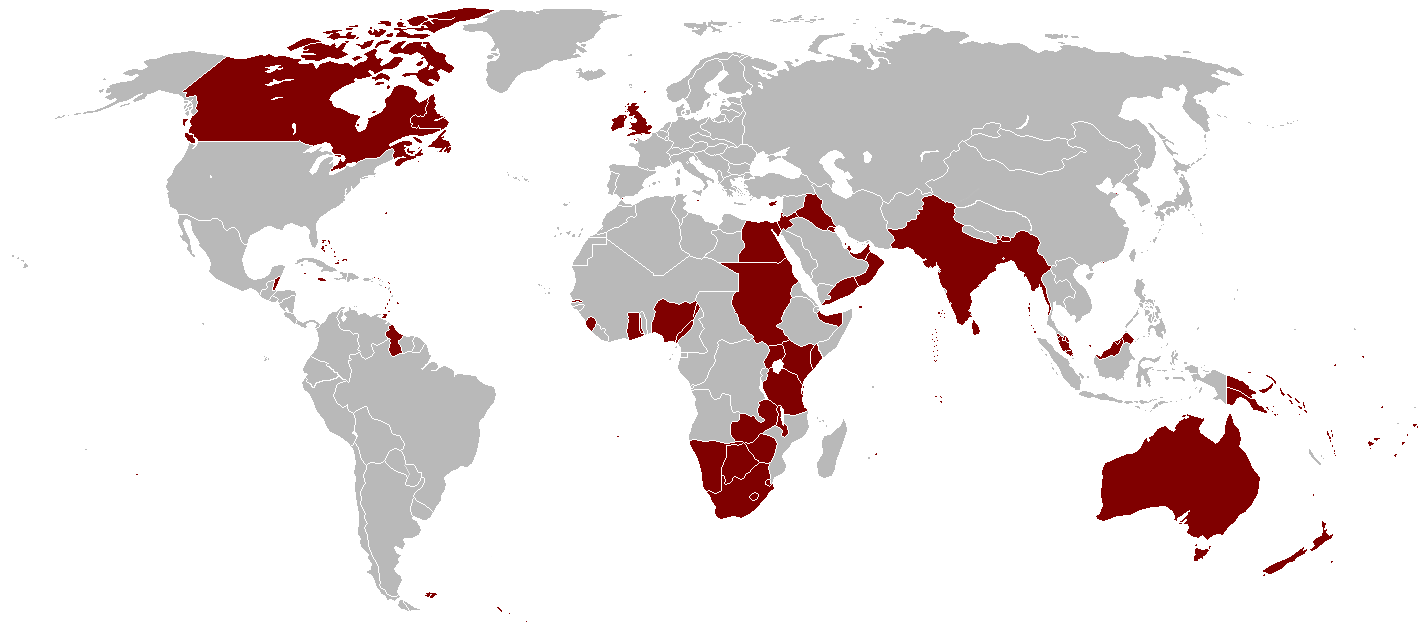
Map of the British Empire at its territorial peak in 1921

A resurgence came in the late 19th century with the Scramble for Africa and major additions in Asia and the Middle East. The British spirit of imperialism was expressed by Joseph Chamberlain and Lord Rosebury, and implemented in Africa by Cecil Rhodes. The pseudo-sciences of Social Darwinism and theories of race formed an ideological underpinning and legitimation during this time. Other influential spokesmen included Lord Cromer, Lord Curzon, General Kitchener, Lord Milner, and the writer Rudyard Kipling. After the First Boer War, the South African Republic and Orange Free State were recognised by the United Kingdom but eventually re-annexed after the Second Boer War. But British power was fading, as the reunited German state founded by the Kingdom of Prussia posed a growing threat to Britain's dominance. As of 1913, the United Kingdom was the world's fourth economy, behind the U.S., Russia and Germany.

Irish War of Independence in 1919–1921 led to the сreation of the Irish Free State. But the United Kingdom gained control of former German and Ottoman colonies with the League of Nations mandate. The United Kingdom now had a practically continuous line of controlled territories from Egypt to Burma and another one from Cairo to Cape Town. However, this period was also one of emergence of independence movements based on nationalism and new experiences the colonists had gained in the war.

World War II decisively weakened Britain's position in the world, especially financially. Decolonization movements arose nearly everywhere in the Empire, resulting in Indian independence and partition in 1947, the self-governing dominions break away from the empire in 1949, and the establishment of independent states in the 1950s. British imperialism showed its frailty in Egypt during the Suez Crisis in 1956. However, with the United States and Soviet Union emerging from World War II as the sole superpowers, Britain's role as a worldwide power declined significantly and rapidly.

=== Canada ===
In Canada, the "imperialism" (and the related term "colonialism") has had a variety of contradictory meanings since the 19th century. In the late 19th and early 20th, to be an "imperialist" meant thinking of Canada as a part of the British nation not a separate nation. The older words for the same concepts were "loyalism" or "unionism", which continued to be used as well. In mid-twentieth century Canada, the words "imperialism" and "colonialism" were used in English Canadian discourse to instead portray Canada as a victim of economic and cultural penetration by the United States. In twentieth century French-Canadian discourse the "imperialists" were all the Anglo-Saxon countries including Canada who were oppressing French-speakers and the province of Quebec. By the early 21st century, "colonialism" was used to highlight supposed anti-indigenous attitudes and actions of Canada inherited from the British period.

=== China ===
The Qing Empire c. 1820 marked the time when the Qing began to rule these areas.

China was home to some of the world's oldest empires. Due to its long history of imperialist expansion, China has been seen by its neighboring countries as a threat due to its large population, giant economy, large military force as well as its territorial evolution throughout history. Starting with the unification of China under the Qin dynasty, later Chinese dynasties continued to follow its form of expansions.

The most successful Chinese imperial dynasties in terms of territorial expansion were the Han, Tang, Yuan, and Qing dynasties.

=== Denmark ===
Denmark–Norway (Denmark after 1814) possessed overseas colonies from 1536 until 1953. At its apex there were colonies on four continents: Europe, North America, Africa and Asia. In the 17th century, following territorial losses on the Scandinavian Peninsula, Denmark-Norway began to develop colonies, forts, and trading posts in West Africa, the Caribbean, and the Indian subcontinent. Christian IV first initiated the policy of expanding Denmark-Norway's overseas trade, as part of the mercantilist wave that was sweeping Europe. Denmark-Norway's first colony was established at Tranquebar on India's southern coast in 1620. Admiral Ove Gjedde led the expedition that established the colony. After 1814, when Norway was ceded to Sweden, Denmark retained what remained of Norway's great medieval colonial holdings. One by one the smaller colonies were lost or sold. Tranquebar was sold to the British in 1845. The United States purchased the Danish West Indies in 1917. Iceland became independent in 1944. Today, the only remaining vestiges are two originally Norwegian colonies that are currently within the Danish Realm, the Faroe Islands and Greenland; the Faroes were a Danish county until 1948, while Greenland's colonial status ceased in 1953. They are now autonomous territories.

=== Dutch ===
The most notable example of Dutch imperialism is regarding Indonesia.

=== Egypt ===
The New Kingdom, also called the Egyptian Empire, refers to ancient Egypt between the 16th century BC and the 11th century BC. This period of ancient Egyptian history covers the Eighteenth, Nineteenth, and Twentieth dynasties. Through radiocarbon dating, the establishment of the New Kingdom has been placed between 1570 and 1544 BC. The New Kingdom followed the Second Intermediate Period and was succeeded by the Third Intermediate Period. It was the most prosperous time for ancient Egypt and marked the peak of its power.

=== France ===
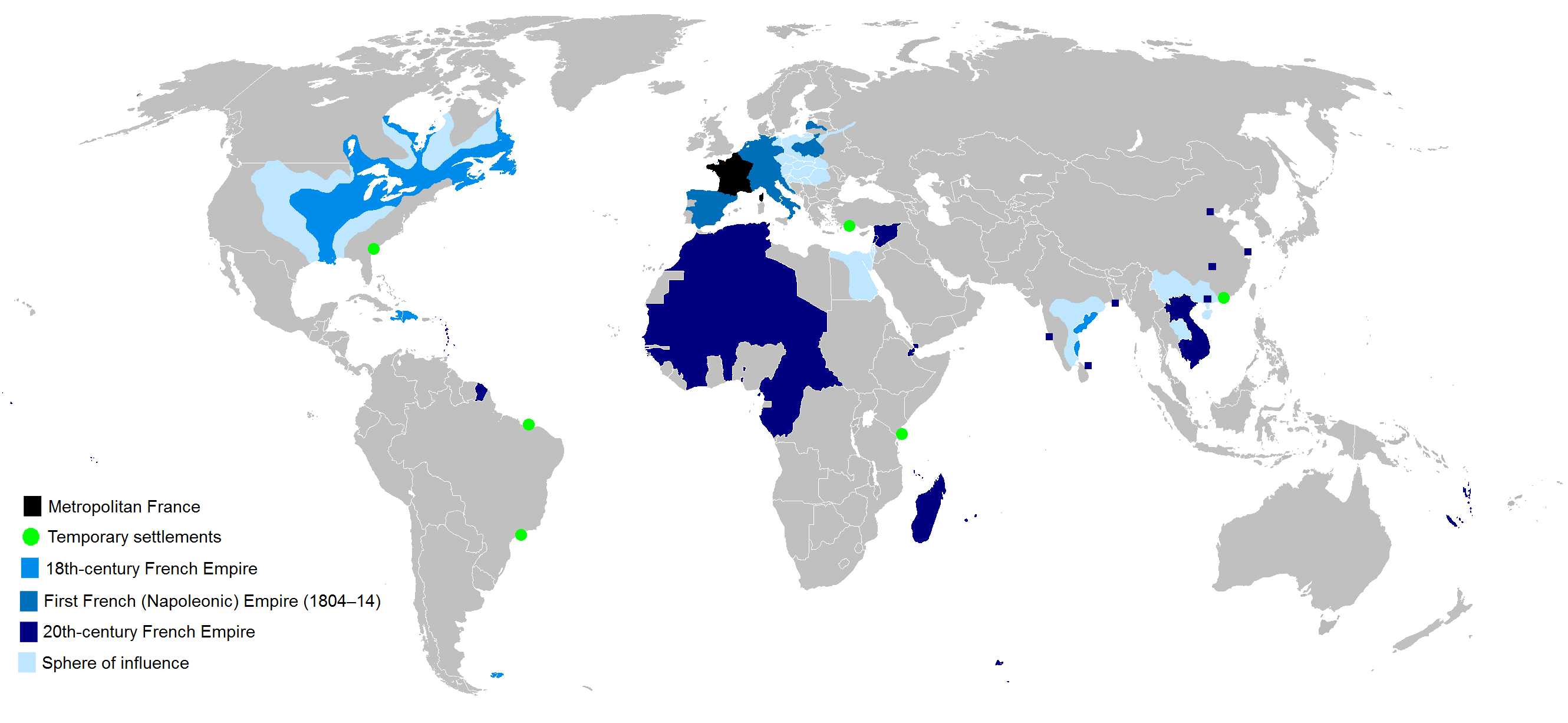
Map of the first (light blue) and second (dark blue) French colonial empires

During the 16th century, the French colonization of the Americas began with the creation of New France. It was followed by French East India Company's trading posts in Africa and Asia in the 17th century. France had its "First colonial empire" from 1534 until 1814, including New France (Canada, Acadia, Newfoundland and Louisiana), French West Indies (Saint-Domingue, Guadeloupe, Martinique), French Guiana, Senegal (Gorée), Mascarene Islands (Mauritius Island, Réunion) and French India.

Its "Second colonial empire" began with the seizure of Algiers in 1830 and came for the most part to an end with the granting of independence to Algeria in 1962. The French imperial history was marked by numerous wars, large and small, and also by significant help to France itself from the colonials in the world wars. France took control of Algeria in 1830 but began in earnest to rebuild its worldwide empire after 1850, concentrating chiefly in North and West Africa (French North Africa, French West Africa, French Equatorial Africa), as well as South-East Asia (French Indochina), with other conquests in the South Pacific (New Caledonia, French Polynesia). France also twice attempted to make Mexico a colony in 1838–39 and in 1861–67 (see Pastry War and Second French intervention in Mexico).

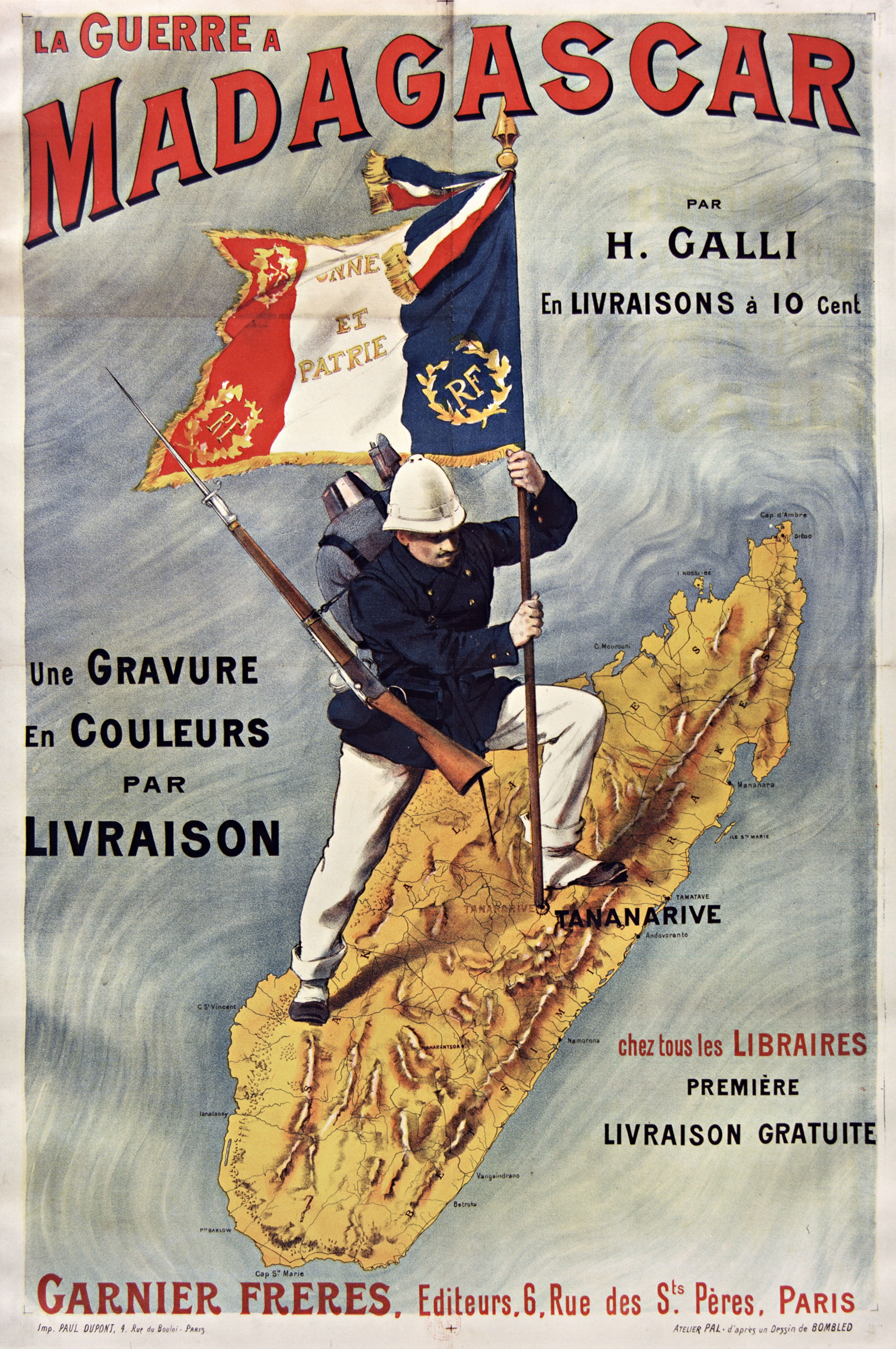
French poster about the "Madagascar War"

French Republicans, at first hostile to empire, only became supportive when Germany started to build her own colonial empire. As it developed, the new empire took on roles of trade with France, supplying raw materials and purchasing manufactured items, as well as lending prestige to the fatherland and spreading French civilization and language as well as Catholicism. It also provided crucial manpower in both World Wars. It became a moral justification to lift the world up to French standards by bringing Christianity and French culture. In 1884 the leading exponent of colonialism, Jules Ferry declared France had a civilising mission: "The higher races have a right over the lower races, they have a duty to civilize the inferior". Full citizenship rights – assimilation – were offered, although in reality assimilation was always on the distant horizon. Contrasting from Britain, France sent small numbers of settlers to its colonies, with the only notable exception of Algeria, where French settlers nevertheless always remained a small minority.

The French colonial empire of extended over 11,500,000 km^{2} (4,400,000 sq mi) at its height in the 1920s and had a population of 110 million people on the eve of World War II.

In World War II, Charles de Gaulle and the Free French used the overseas colonies as bases from which they fought to liberate France. However, after 1945 anti-colonial movements began to challenge the Empire. France fought and lost a bitter war in Vietnam in the 1950s. Whereas they won the war in Algeria, de Gaulle decided to grant Algeria independence anyway in 1962. French settlers and many local supporters relocated to France. Nearly all of France's colonies gained independence by 1960, but France retained significant financial and diplomatic influence. It has repeatedly sent troops to assist its former colonies in Africa in suppressing insurrections and coups d'état.

==== Education policy ====
French colonial officials, influenced by the revolutionary ideal of equality, standardized schools, curricula, and teaching methods as much as possible. They did not establish colonial school systems with the idea of furthering the ambitions of the local people, but rather exported the systems and methods in vogue in the father nation. Having a moderately trained lower bureaucracy was of great use to colonial officials. The emerging French-educated indigenous elite saw little value in educating rural peoples. After 1946 the policy was to bring the best students to Paris for advanced training. The result was to immerse the next generation of leaders in the growing anti-colonial diaspora centered in Paris. Impressionistic colonials could mingle with studious scholars or radical revolutionaries or so everything in between. Ho Chi Minh and other young radicals in Paris formed the French Communist party in 1920.

Tunisia was exceptional. The colony was administered by Paul Cambon, who built an educational system for colonists and indigenous people alike that was closely modeled on mainland France. He emphasized female and vocational education. By independence, the quality of Tunisian education nearly equalled that in France.

African nationalists rejected such a public education system, which they perceived as an attempt to retard African development and maintain colonial superiority. One of the first demands of the emerging nationalist movement after World War II was the introduction of full metropolitan-style education in French West Africa with its promise of equality with Europeans.

In Algeria, the debate was polarized. The French set up schools based on the scientific method and French culture. The Pied-Noir (Catholic migrants from Europe) welcomed this. Those goals were rejected by the Moslem Arabs, who prized mental agility and their distinctive religious tradition. The Arabs refused to become patriotic and cultured Frenchmen and a unified educational system was impossible until the Pied-Noir and their Arab allies went into exile after 1962.

In South Vietnam from 1955 to 1975 there were two competing powers in education, as the French continued their work and the Americans moved in. They sharply disagreed on goals. The French educators sought to preserving French culture among the Vietnamese elites and relied on the Mission Culturelle – the heir of the colonial Direction of Education – and its prestigious high schools. The Americans looked at the great mass of people and sought to make South Vietnam a nation strong enough to stop communism. The Americans had far more money, as USAID coordinated and funded the activities of expert teams, and particularly of academic missions. The French deeply resented the American invasion of their historical zone of cultural imperialism.

=== Germany ===
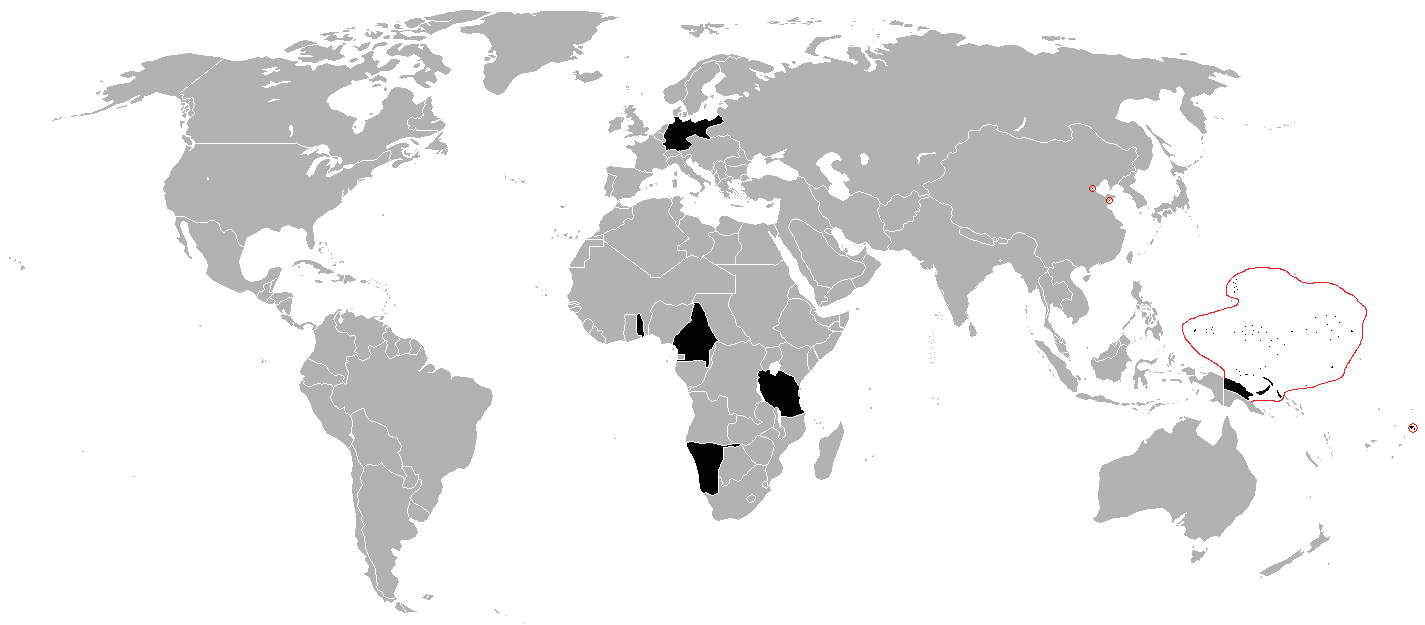
German colonial empire, the third largest colonial empire during the 19th century after the British and the French ones

German expansion into Slavic lands begins in the 12th–13th-century (see Drang Nach Osten). The concept of Drang Nach Osten was a core element of German nationalism and a major element of Nazi ideology. However, the German involvement in the seizure of overseas territories was negligible until the end of the 19th century. Prussia unified the other states into the second German Empire in 1871. Its Chancellor, Otto von Bismarck (1862–90), long opposed colonial acquisitions, arguing that the burden of obtaining, maintaining, and defending such possessions would outweigh any potential benefits. He felt that colonies did not pay for themselves, that the German bureaucratic system would not work well in the tropics and the diplomatic disputes over colonies would distract Germany from its central interest, Europe itself.

However, public opinion and elite opinion in Germany demanded colonies for reasons of international prestige, so Bismarck was forced to oblige. In 1883–84 Germany began to build a colonial empire in Africa and the South Pacific. The establishment of the German colonial empire started with German New Guinea in 1884. Within 25 years, German South West Africa had committed the Herero and Namaqua genocide in modern-day Namibia, the first genocide of the 20th century.

German colonies included the present territories of in Africa: Tanzania, Rwanda, Burundi, Namibia, Cameroon, Ghana and Togo; in Oceania: New Guinea, Solomon Islands, Nauru, Marshall Islands, Mariana Islands, Caroline Islands and Samoa; and in Asia: Qingdao, Yantai and the Jiaozhou Bay. The Treaty of Versailles made them mandates under the control the Allied victors. Germany also lost the portions of its Eastern territories that had Polish majorities to independent Poland as a result of the Treaty of Versailles in 1919. The Eastern territories inhabited by a German majority since the Middle Ages were torn from Germany and became part of both Poland and the USSR as a result of the territorial reorganization established by the Potsdam Conference of the Allied powers in 1945.

=== Inca ===
The Inca Empire, (Note: Also known as the Incan Empire, or Inka Empire.) officially known as the Realm of the Four Parts (Quechua: Tawantinsuyu, pronounced [taˈwantiŋ ˈsuju], lit. 'land of four parts'), was the largest empire in pre-Columbian America. The administrative, political, and military center of the empire was in the city of Cusco. The Inca civilisation rose from the Peruvian highlands sometime in the early 13th century. The Portuguese explorer Aleixo Garcia was the first European to reach the Inca Empire in 1524. Later, in 1532, the Spanish began the conquest of the Inca Empire, and by 1572 the last Inca state was fully conquered.

=== Islamic ===
Spread of Islam

The Early Muslim conquests and the pan-Islamic Caliphate have been described as religious imperialism motivated by Islamic supremacism.

=== Italy ===
The Italian Empire in 1940

The Italian Empire (Impero italiano) comprised the overseas possessions of the Kingdom of Italy primarily in northeast Africa. It began with the purchase in 1869 of Assab Bay on the Red Sea by an Italian navigation company which intended to establish a coaling station at the time the Suez Canal was being opened to navigation. This was taken over by the Italian government in 1882, becoming modern Italy's first overseas territory. By the start of the First World War in 1914, Italy had acquired in Africa the colony of Eritrea on the Red Sea coast, a large protectorate and later colony in Somalia, and authority in formerly Ottoman Tripolitania and Cyrenaica (gained after the Italo-Turkish War) which were later unified in the colony of Libya.

Outside Africa, Italy possessed the Dodecanese Islands off the coast of Turkey (following the Italo-Turkish War) and a small concession in Tianjin in China following the Boxer War of 1900. During the First World War, Italy occupied southern Albania to prevent it from falling to Austria-Hungary. In 1917, it established a protectorate over Albania, which remained in place until 1920. The Fascist government that came to power with Benito Mussolini in 1922 sought to increase the size of the Italian empire and to satisfy the claims of Italian irredentists. After its second invasion of Ethiopia in 1936, Italy occupied Ethiopia until 1941.The Italian Empire is generally considered to have reached its greatest territorial extent between 1936 and 1940, following the conquest of Ethiopia and the proclamation of Italian East Africa. During this period, Italy controlled Libya, Eritrea, Italian Somaliland, Ethiopia (as part of Italian East Africa), the Dodecanese Islands, and Albania, in addition to smaller concessions elsewhere.The Italian colonial project under Fascism was justified by a combination of nationalism, irredentism, and a so-called civilizing mission. The regime promoted the spread of Italian language, culture, and institutions in its colonies, presenting colonial expansion as a way to assert Italy's prestige and modernize the territories under its control. Italian authorities established administrative structures and educational institutions in the colonies to govern local populations and train an elite loyal to Italy. Schools for Italian settlers and selected local students were created, with curricula modeled on the Italian system, aiming to integrate the colonies culturally and politically into the empire. At its peak, the Italian Empire covered several million square kilometers in Africa and the Mediterranean, ruling over millions of inhabitants. This period coincided with the broader maximum territorial extent of the European imperial powers during the interwar years. In 1939, Italy invaded Albania and incorporated it into the Fascist state. During the Second World War (1939–1945), Italy occupied British Somaliland, parts of south-eastern France, western Egypt and most of Greece, but then lost those conquests and its African colonies, including Ethiopia, to the invading allied forces by 1943. It was forced in the peace treaty of 1947 to relinquish sovereignty over all its colonies. It was granted a trust to administer former Italian Somaliland under United Nations supervision in 1950. When Somalia became independent in 1960, Italy's eight-decade experiment with colonialism ended.

=== Japan ===
The Greater East Asia Co-Prosperity Sphere in 1942

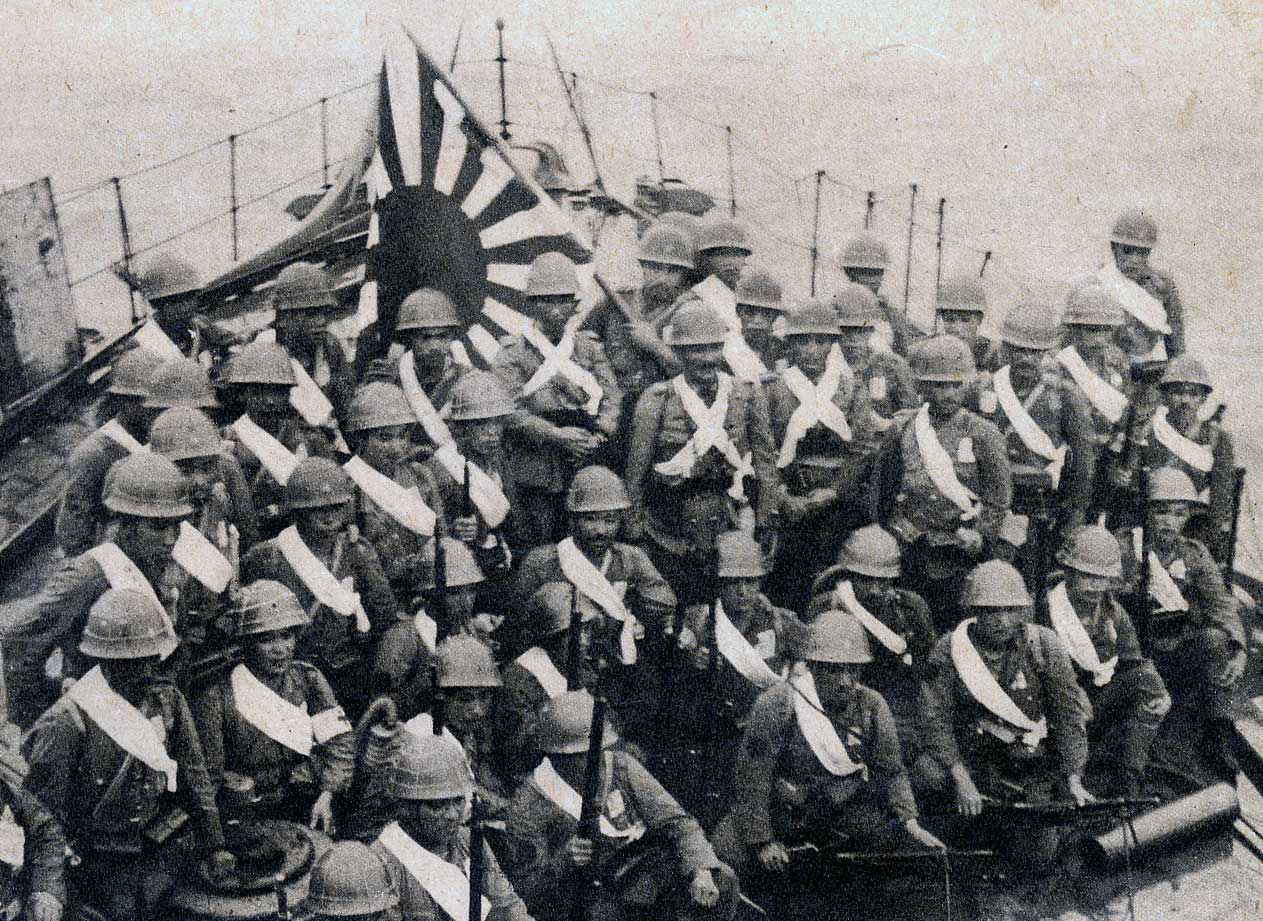
Japanese Marines preparing to land in Anqing, China, in June 1938

For over 200 years, Japan maintained a feudal society during a period of relative isolation from the rest of the world. However, in the 1850s, military pressure from the United States and other world powers coerced Japan to open itself to the global market, resulting in an end to the country's isolation. A period of conflicts and political revolutions followed due to socioeconomic uncertainty, ending in 1868 with the reunification of political power under the Japanese Emperor during the Meiji Restoration. This sparked a period of rapid industrialization driven in part by a Japanese desire for self-sufficiency. By the early 1900s, Japan was a naval power that could hold its own against an established European power as it defeated Russia.

Despite its rising population and increasingly industrialized economy, Japan lacked significant natural resources. As a result, the country turned to imperialism and expansionism in part as a means of compensating for these shortcomings, adopting the national motto "Fukoku kyōhei" (富國強兵, "Enrich the state, strengthen the military").

And Japan was eager to take every opportunity. In 1869 they took advantage of the defeat of the rebels of the Republic of Ezo to formally incorporate the island of Hokkaido into the Japanese Empire. For centuries, Japan viewed the Ryukyu Islands as one of its provinces. In 1871 the Mudan incident happened: Taiwanese aborigines murdered 54 Ryūkyūan sailors that became shipwrecked. At that time the Ryukyu Islands were claimed by both Qing China and Japan, and the Japanese interpreted the incident as an attack on their citizens. They took steps to bring the islands in their jurisdiction: in 1872 the Japanese Ryukyu Domain was declared, and in 1874 a retaliatory incursion to Taiwan was sent, which was a success. The success of this expedition emboldened the Japanese: not even the Americans could defeat the Taiwanese in the Formosa Expedition of 1867. Few gave it much thought at the time, but this was the first move in the Japanese expansionism series. Japan occupied Taiwan for the rest of 1874 and then left owing to Chinese pressures, but in 1879 it finally annexed the Ryukyu Islands. In 1875 Qing China sent a 300-men force to subdue the Taiwanese, but unlike the Japanese the Chinese were routed, ambushed and 250 of their men were killed; the failure of this expedition exposed once more the failure of Qing China to exert effective control in Taiwan, and acted as another incentive for the Japanese to annex Taiwan. Eventually, the spoils for winning the First Sino-Japanese War in 1894 included Taiwan.

In 1875 Japan took its first operation against Joseon Korea, another territory that for centuries it coveted; the Ganghwa Island incident made Korea open to international trade. Korea was annexed in 1910. As a result of winning the Russo-Japanese War in 1905, Japan took part of Sakhalin Island from Russia. Precisely, the victory against the Russian Empire shook the world: never before had an Asian nation defeated a European power, and in Japan it was seen as a feat. Japan's victory against Russia would act as an antecedent for Asian countries in the fight against the Western powers for Decolonization. During World War I, Japan took German-leased territories in China's Shandong Province, as well as the Mariana, Caroline, and Marshall Islands, and kept the islands as League of nations mandates. At first, Japan was in good standing with the victorious Allied powers of World War I, but different discrepancies and dissatisfaction with the rewards of the treaties cooled the relations with them, for example American pressure forced it to return the Shandong area. By the '30s, economic depression, urgency of resources and a growing distrust in the Allied powers made Japan lean to a hardened militaristic stance. Through the decade, it would grow closer to Germany and Italy, forming together the Axis alliance. In 1931 Japan took Manchuria from China. International reactions condemned this move, but Japan's already strong skepticism against Allied nations meant that it nevertheless carried on.

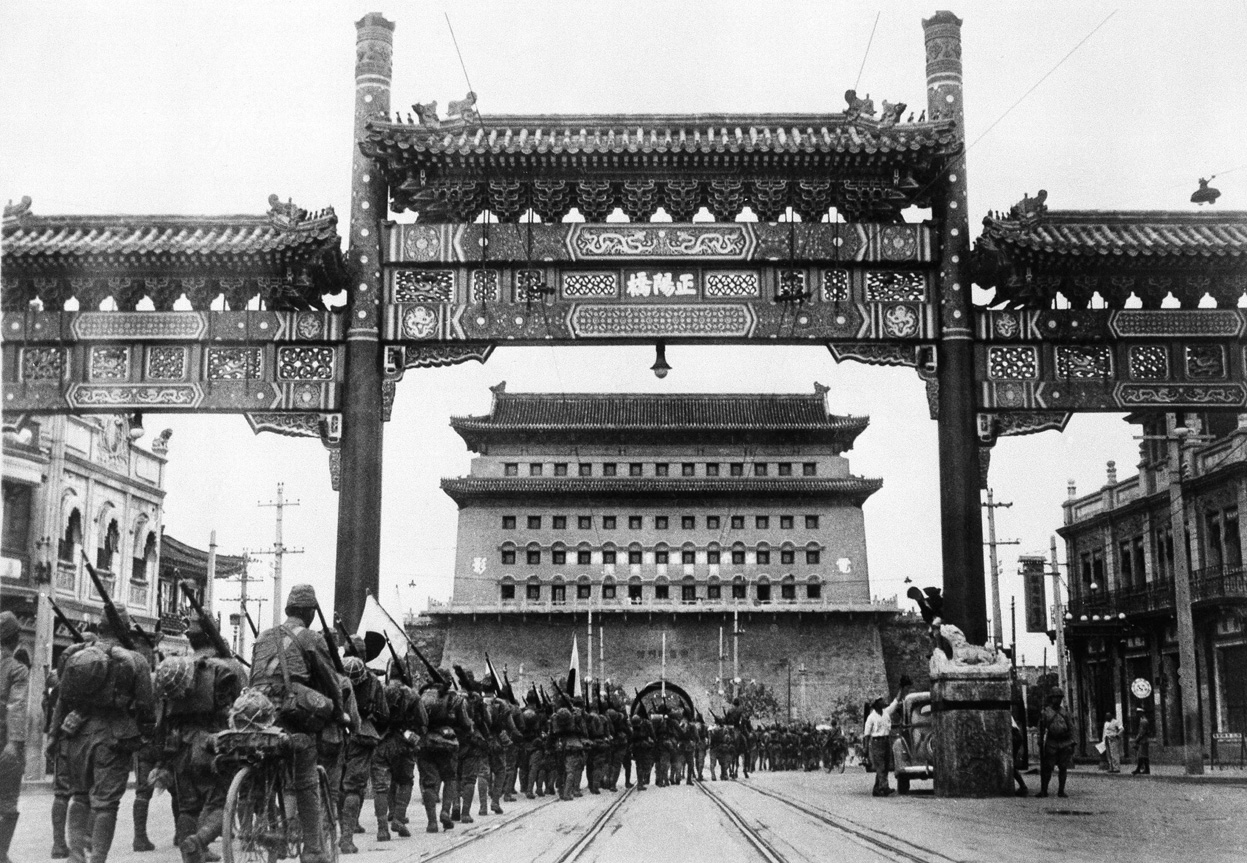
Japanese march into Zhengyangmen of Beijing after capturing the city in July 1937.

During the Second Sino-Japanese War in 1937, Japan's military invaded central China. Also, in 1938–1939 Japan made an attempt to seize the territory of Soviet Russia and Mongolia, but suffered a serious defeats (see Battle of Lake Khasan, Battles of Khalkhin Gol). By now, relations with the Allied powers were at the bottom, and an international boycott against Japan to deprive it of natural resources was enforced. A military move to gain access to them was deemed necessary, and so Japan attacked Pearl Harbor, bringing the United States to World War II. Using its superior technological advances in naval aviation and its modern doctrines of amphibious and naval warfare, Japan achieved one of the fastest maritime expansions in history. By 1942 Japan had conquered much of East Asia and the Pacific, including the east of China, Hong Kong, Thailand, Vietnam, Cambodia, Burma (Myanmar), Malaysia, the Philippines, Indonesia, part of New Guinea and many islands of the Pacific Ocean. Just as Japan's late industrialization success and victory against the Russian Empire was seen as an example among underdeveloped Asia-Pacific nations, the Japanese took advantage of this and promoted among its conquered the goal to jointly create an anti-European "Greater East Asia Co-Prosperity Sphere". This plan helped the Japanese gain support from native populations during its conquests especially in Indonesia. However, the United States had a vastly stronger military and industrial base and defeated Japan, stripping it of conquests and returning its settlers back to Japan.

=== Mongol ===
The Mongol Empire was the largest contiguous empire in history. Originating in present-day Mongolia in East Asia, the medieval empire at its height stretched from the Sea of Japan to Eastern Europe, extending northward into Siberia and east and southward into the Indian subcontinent, mounting invasions of Southeast Asia, and conquering the Iranian plateau; and reaching westward as far as the Levant and the Carpathian Mountains.

=== Mughal ===
The Mughal Empire was an early modern empire in South Asia. At its peak, the empire stretched from the outer fringes of the Indus River Basin in the west, northern Afghanistan in the northwest, and Kashmir in the north, to the highlands of present-day Assam and Bangladesh in the east, and the uplands of the Deccan Plateau in South India.

=== Nomadic empires ===
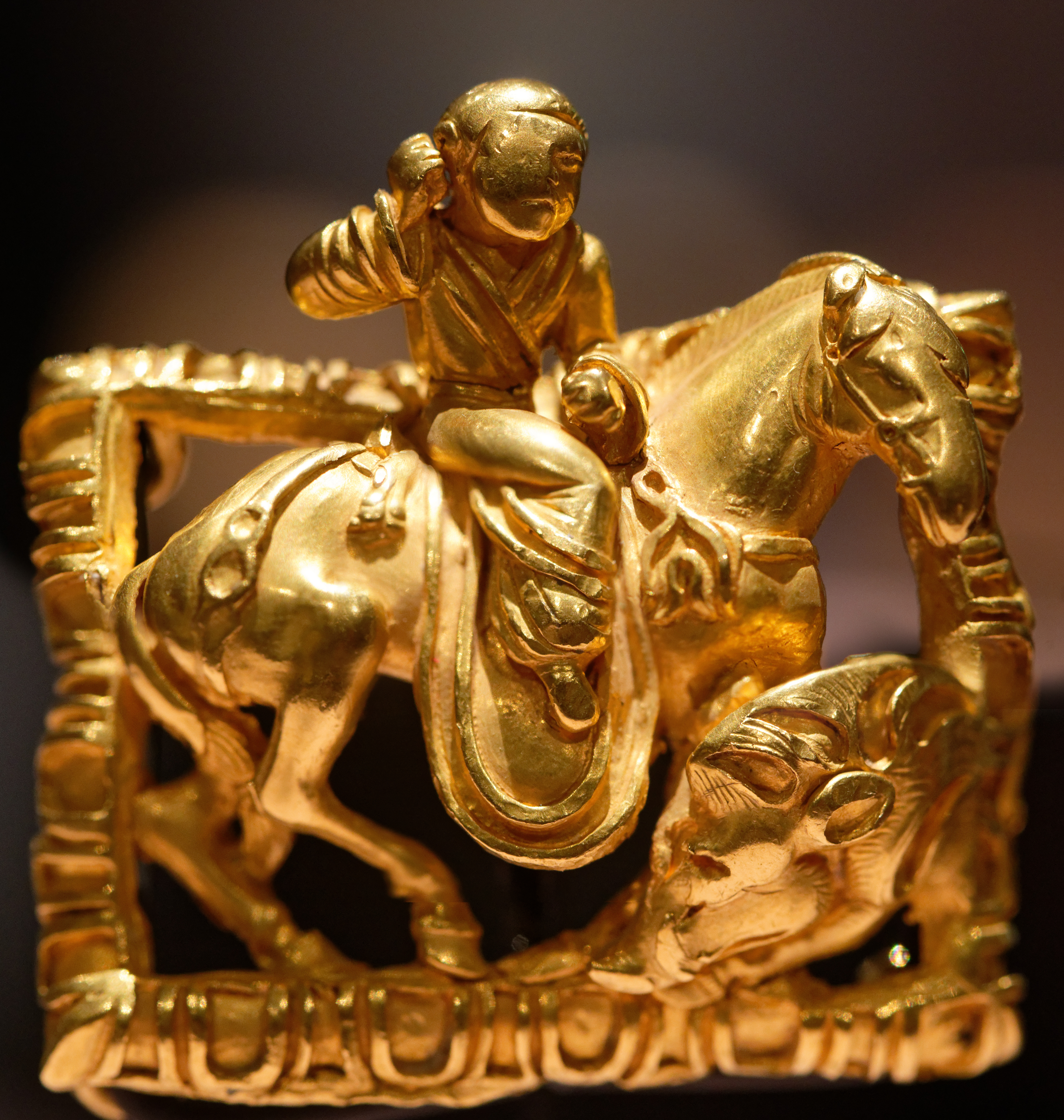
A horserider of probable Xiongnu origin: the rider wears a hairbun characteristic of the oriental steppes, and his horse has characteristically Xiongnu horse trappings. 2nd–1st century BC. Excavated in Saksanokhur (near Farkhor), Tajikistan. National Museum of Antiquities of Tajikistan.

Nomadic empires, sometimes also called steppe empires, Central or Inner Asian empires, were the empires erected by the bow-wielding, horse-riding, nomadic people in the Eurasian Steppe, from classical antiquity (Scythia) to the early modern era (Dzungars). They are the most prominent example of non-sedentary polities.

=== Ottoman ===
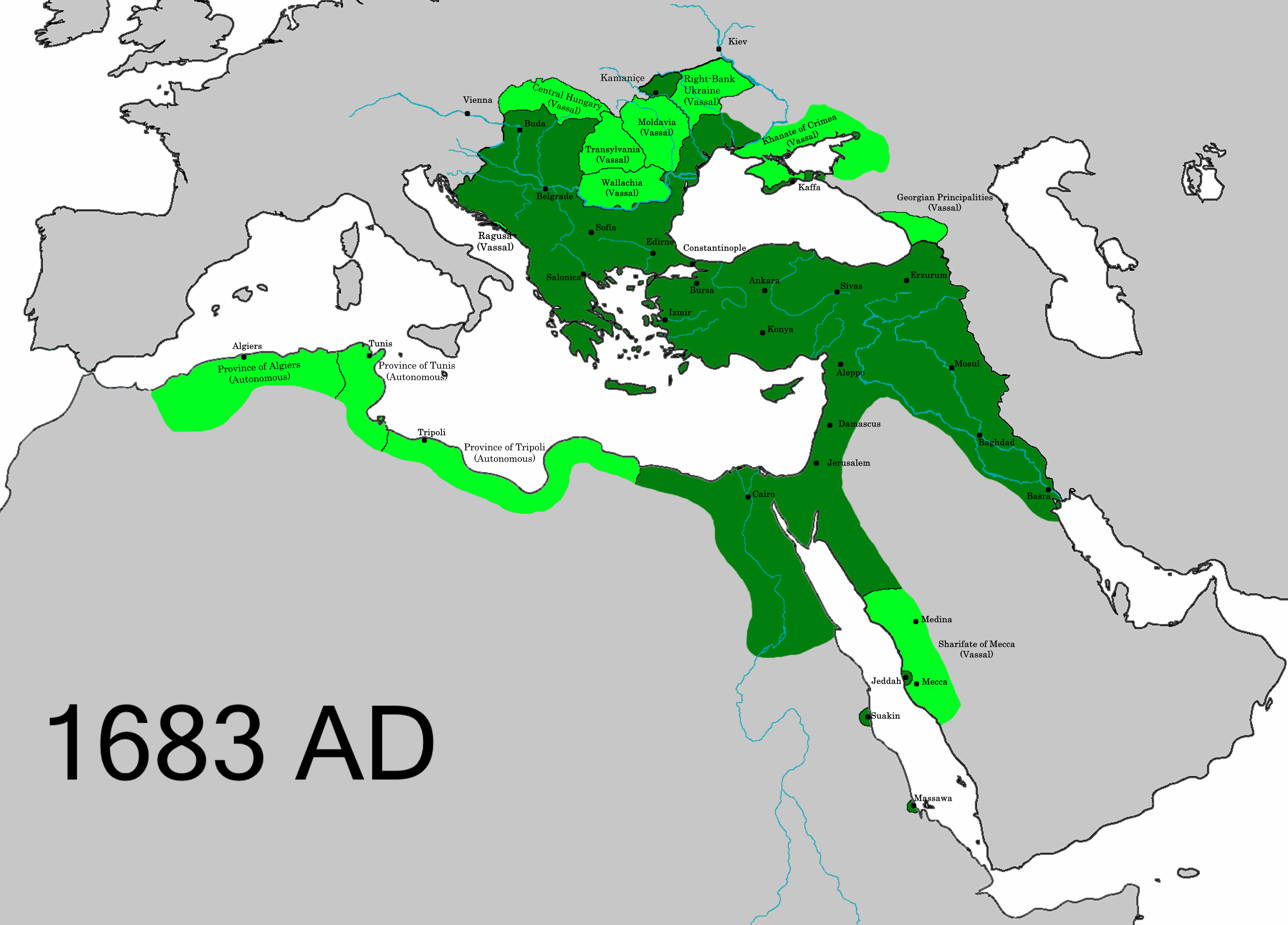
The Ottoman Empire in 1683; core possessions in dark green; vassal or autonomous areas in light green.

The Ottoman Empire was an imperial state that lasted from 1299 to 1922. In 1453, Mehmed the Conqueror captured Constantinople and made it his capital. During the 16th and 17th centuries, in particular at the height of its power under the reign of Suleiman the Magnificent, the Ottoman Empire was a powerful multinational, multilingual empire, which invaded and colonized much of Southeast Europe, Western Asia, the Caucasus, North Africa, and the Horn of Africa. Its repeated invasions, and brutal treatment of Slavs led to the Great Migrations of the Serbs to escape persecution. At the beginning of the 17th century the empire contained 32 provinces and numerous vassal states. Some of these were later absorbed into the empire, while others were granted various types of autonomy during the course of centuries.

Following a long period of military setbacks against European powers, the Ottoman Empire gradually declined, losing control of much of its territory in Europe and Africa.

By 1810 Egypt was effectively independent. In 1821–1829 the Greeks in the Greek War of Independence were assisted by Russia, Britain and France. In 1815 to 1914 the Ottoman Empire could exist only in the conditions of acute rivalry of the great powers, with Britain its main supporter, especially in the Crimean War 1853–1856, against Russia. After Ottoman defeat in the Russo-Turkish War (1877–1878), Bulgaria, Serbia and Montenegro gained independence and Britain took colonial control of Cyprus, while Bosnia and Herzegovina were occupied and annexed by Austro-Hungarian Empire in 1908.

The empire allied with Germany in World War I, aiming to recover lost territories, but dissolved following its decisive defeat. The Turkish national movement, supported by Soviet Russia, achieved victory in the course of the Turkish War of Independence, and the parties signed and ratified the Treaty of Lausanne in 1923 and 1924. The Republic of Turkey was established.

=== Persia ===
The Guarded Domains of Iran, (Note: ممالک محروسه ایران, Mamâlek-e Mahruse-ye Irân) commonly called Safavid (Note: /ˈsæfəvɪd, ˈsɑː-/) Iran, Safavid Persia or the Safavid Empire, (Note: شاهنشاهی صفوی, Šāhanšāhi-ye Safavi) was one of the largest and longest-lasting Iranian empires. It was ruled by the Safavid dynasty from 1501 to 1736, though some historians date its fall to 1722, when Isfahan fell to the Afghans. It is often considered the beginning of modern Iranian history, as well as one of the gunpowder empires.

=== Portugal ===
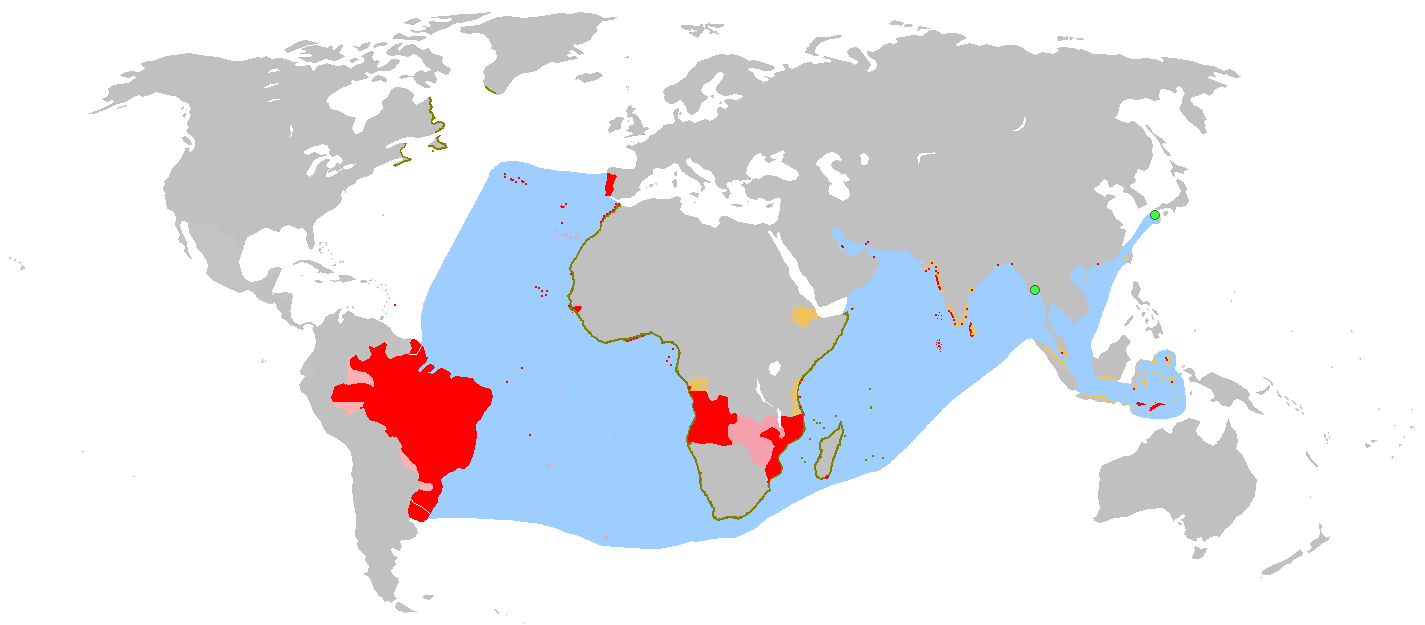
Map of the Portuguese Empire.

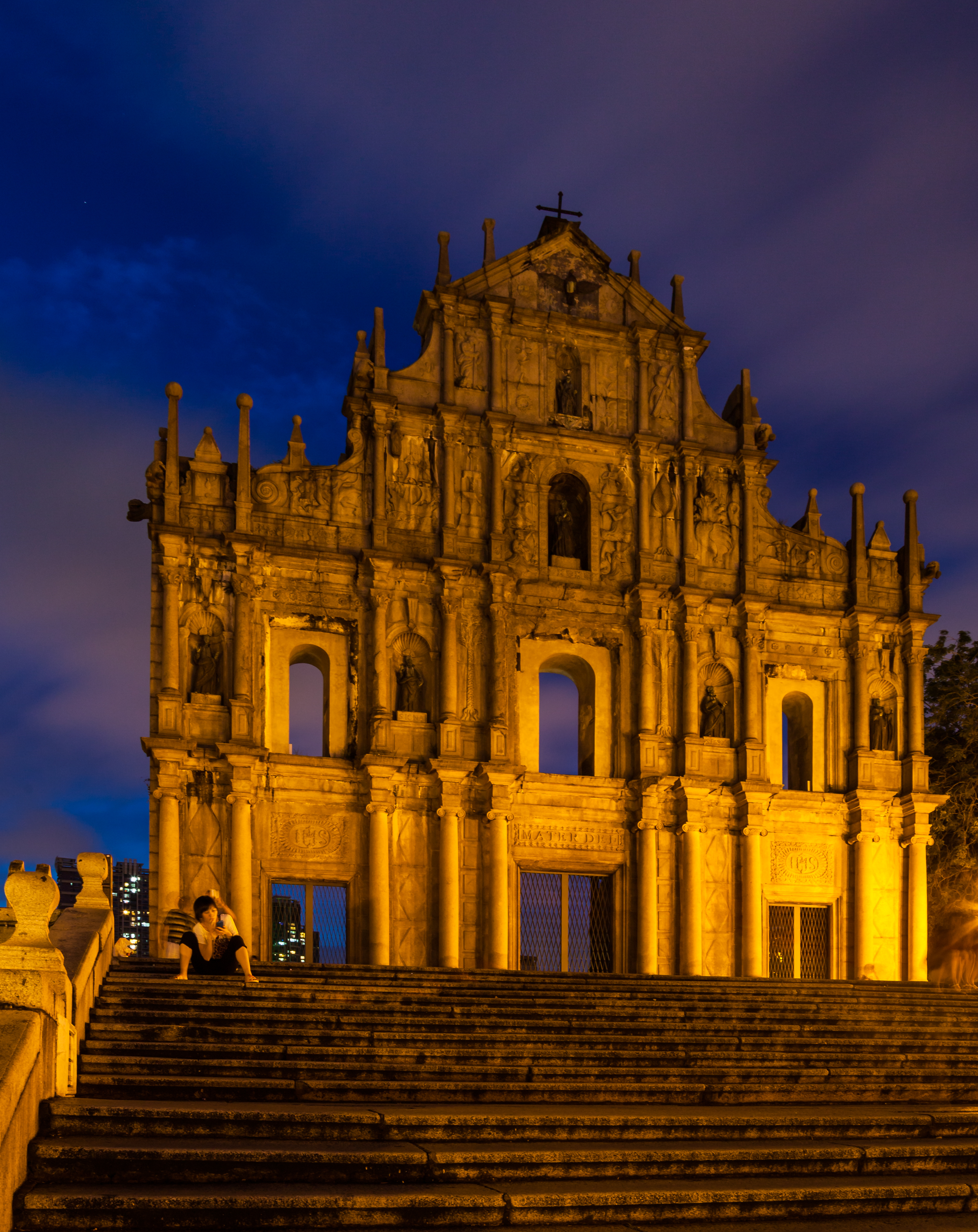
Ruins of St. Paul's Cathedral in Macau, a 17th-century Portuguese church and a symbol of the Portuguese colonial presence in Asia.

The Portuguese Empire comprised the overseas possessions of Portugal from the 15th century until the mid-20th century. It began with explorations along the West African coast and the establishment of trading posts in Morocco, then expanded to Brazil, India (Goa), and parts of Southeast Asia and Africa, including Angola and Mozambique. The Portuguese colonial project was justified by a combination of economic interests, strategic considerations, and a sense of civilizing mission. Portugal aimed to maintain its historical overseas possessions while spreading Portuguese language, culture, and Catholicism. Colonial expansion was also presented as a way to assert Portugal's prestige internationally. Portuguese authorities established administrative systems to govern local populations and maintain control over trade and resources. Educational institutions were limited, often focused on basic literacy and vocational training for selected local elites, while promoting Portuguese language and culture to integrate the colonies politically and culturally. At its height in the early 20th century, the Portuguese Empire controlled territories in Africa, Asia, and South America, including Angola, Mozambique, Guinea-Bissau, Cape Verde, São Tomé and Príncipe, Goa, Macau, and East Timor. This period coincided with the broader maximum territorial extent of the European imperial powers during the late 19th and early 20th centuries. The Portuguese Empire gradually declined after World War I and, later, after World War II, as independence movements arose in Africa and Asia. Most of the African colonies gained independence in the 1970s, marking the end of Portugal's overseas empire.

=== Rome ===
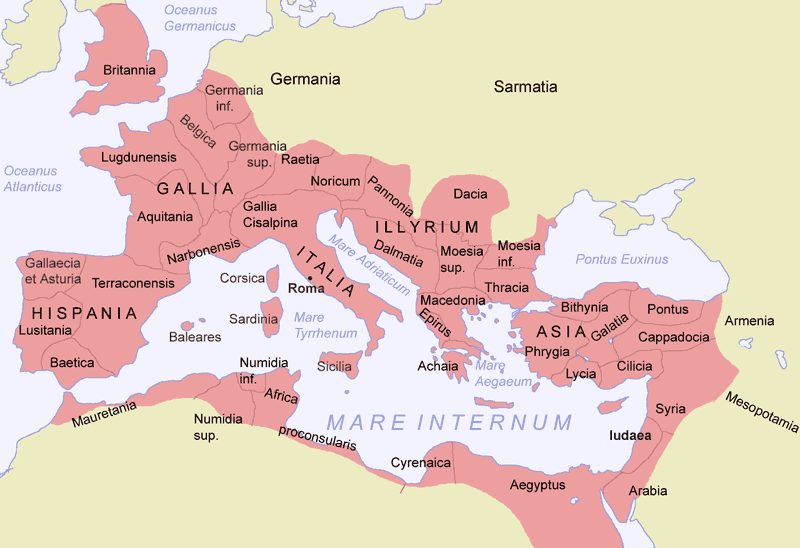
Provinces of the Roman Empire around 117 AD

The Roman Empire was the post-Republican period of ancient Rome. As a polity, it included large territorial holdings around the Mediterranean Sea in Europe, North Africa, and Western Asia, ruled by emperors. The foundation of the empire is traditionally dated to 27 BC, when Augustus became the first emperor, and it continued in the West until 476 AD, while the Eastern Roman Empire (later called the Byzantine Empire) survived until 1453. The expansion of Rome was driven by a combination of military conquest, economic interests, and cultural assimilation. Roman authorities promoted Roman law, language (Latin), religion (including the adoption of Christianity in the 4th century), architecture, and infrastructure, presenting conquest as a way to integrate and stabilize conquered peoples. Roman administration relied on a system of provinces, each governed by officials appointed by the emperor. Local elites were often co-opted into the administration, ensuring loyalty and effective governance. Roads, aqueducts, harbors, and public buildings facilitated communication, trade, and military movements across the vast empire. The Roman army was a key instrument of power, with disciplined legions stationed in strategic regions to maintain order and defend borders. Military innovations, fortifications, and strategic roads enabled Rome to control distant territories and respond quickly to threats. Roman culture, law, and citizenship were extended gradually to conquered peoples. The introduction of Roman citizenship, urban planning, and public institutions helped unify diverse populations and created a sense of shared identity. At its territorial peak under Emperor Trajan around 117 AD, the Roman Empire covered approximately 5 million square kilometres and ruled over 60–70 million people. The empire had a lasting impact on Western civilization, including law, language, architecture, engineering, literature, and governance models. Despite political instability, economic challenges, and external invasions, the Eastern Roman Empire preserved Roman traditions, administration, and law for nearly a thousand years, influencing medieval and modern Europe.

=== Russia ===
==== Russian Empire ====
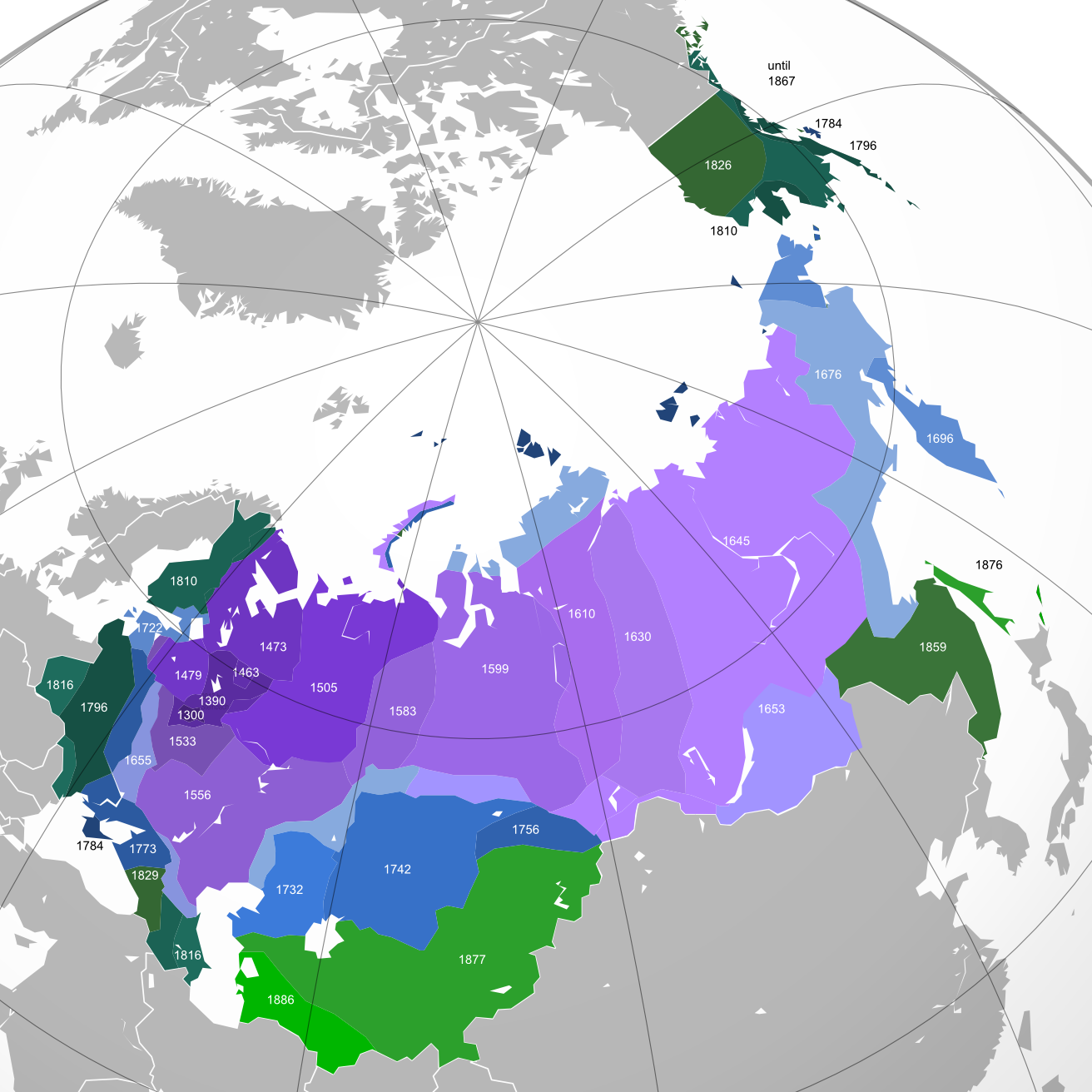
Expansion of the Tsardom and Empire of Russia until 1914

By the 18th century, the Russian Empire extended its control to the Pacific, peacefully forming a common border with the Qing Empire and Empire of Japan. This took place in a large number of military invasions of the lands east, west, and south of it. The Polish–Russian War of 1792 took place after Polish nobility from the Polish–Lithuanian Commonwealth wrote the Constitution of 3 May 1791. The war resulted in eastern Poland being conquered by Imperial Russia as a colony until 1918. The southern campaigns involved a series of Russo-Persian Wars, which began with the Persian Expedition of 1796, resulting in the acquisition of Georgia as a protectorate. Between 1800 and 1864, Imperial armies invaded south in the Russian conquest of the Caucasus, the Murid War, and the Russo-Circassian War. This last conflict led to the ethnic cleansing of Circassians from their lands. The Russian conquest of Siberia over the Khanate of Sibir took place in the 16th and 17th centuries, and resulted in the slaughter of various indigenous tribes by Russians, including the Daur, the Koryaks, the Itelmens, Mansi people and the Chukchi. The Russian colonization of Central and Eastern Europe and Siberia and treatment of the resident indigenous peoples has been compared to European colonization of the Americas, with similar negative impacts on the indigenous Siberians as upon the indigenous peoples of the Americas. The extermination of indigenous Siberian tribes was so complete that a relatively small population of only 180,000 are said to exist today. The Russian Empire exploited and suppressed Cossacks hosts during this period, before turning them into the special military estate Sosloviye in the late 18th century. Cossacks were then used in Imperial Russian campaigns against other tribes.

The acquisition of Ukraine by Russia commenced in 1654 with the Pereiaslav Agreement. Georgia's accession to Russia in 1783 was marked by the Treaty of Georgievsk.

==== Soviet Union ====
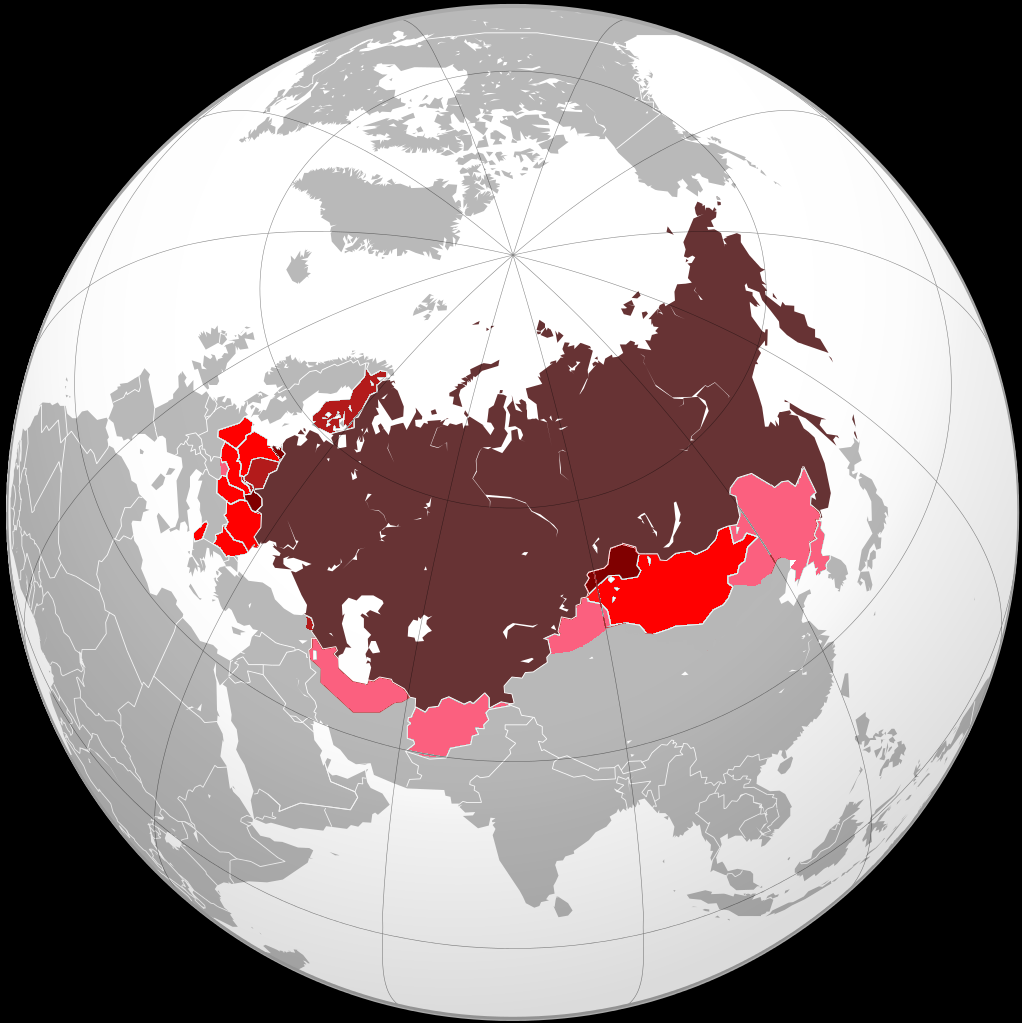
Soviet Union Soviet territories that were never part of Imperial Russia: Tuva, East Prussia, western Ukraine, Kuril Islands Imperial territories that did not become part of the Soviet Union Soviet sphere of influence: Warsaw Pact, Mongolia Soviet military occupation: northern Iran, Manchuria, northern Korea, Xinjiang, Afghanistan

Bolshevik leaders had effectively reestablished a polity with roughly the same extent as that empire by 1921, however with an internationalist ideology: Lenin in particular asserted the right to limited self-determination for national minorities within the new territory. Beginning in 1923, the policy of "Indigenization" [korenizatsiya] was intended to support non-Russians develop their national cultures within a socialist framework. Never formally revoked, it stopped being implemented after 1932. After World War II, the Soviet Union installed socialist regimes modeled on those it had installed in 1919–20 in the old Russian Empire, in areas its forces occupied in Eastern Europe. The Soviet Union and later the People's Republic of China supported revolutionary and communist movements in foreign nations and colonies to advance their own interests, but were not always successful. The USSR provided great assistance to Kuomintang in 1926–1928 in the formation of a unified Chinese government (see Northern Expedition). Although then relations with the USSR deteriorated, but the USSR was the only world power that provided military assistance to China against Japanese aggression in 1937–1941 (see Sino-Soviet Non-Aggression Pact). The victory of the Chinese Communists in the civil war of 1946–1949 relied on the great help of the USSR (see Chinese Civil War).

Although the Soviet Union declared itself anti-imperialist, critics argue that it exhibited traits common to historic empires. Some scholars hold that the Soviet Union was a hybrid entity containing elements common to both multinational empires and nation-states. Some also argued that the USSR practiced colonialism as did other imperial powers and was carrying on the old Russian tradition of expansion and control. Mao Zedong once argued that the Soviet Union had itself become an imperialist power while maintaining a socialist façade. Moreover, the ideas of imperialism were widely spread in action on the higher levels of government. Josip Broz Tito and Milovan Djilas have referred to the Stalinist USSR's foreign policies, such as the occupation and economic exploitations of Eastern Europe and its aggressive and hostile policy towards Yugoslavia as Soviet imperialism. Some Marxists within the Russian Empire and later the USSR, like Sultan Galiev and Vasyl Shakhrai, considered the Soviet regime a renewed version of the Russian imperialism and colonialism. The crushing of the Hungarian Revolution of 1956 and Soviet–Afghan War have been cited as examples.

==== Russia under Putin ====
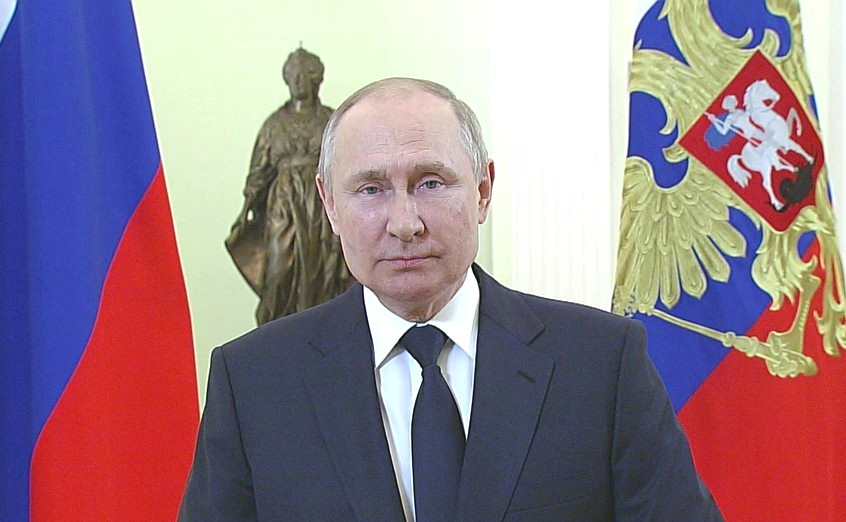
Russia's president Vladimir Putin compared himself to Emperor Peter the Great in an effort to regain former Russian lands.

Since the 2010s, Russia under Vladimir Putin has been described as neo-imperialist. Russia occupies parts of neighboring countries and has engaged in expansionism, most notably with the 2008 Russian invasion of Georgia, the 2014 annexation of Crimea, and the 2022 Russian invasion of Ukraine and annexation of its southeast. Russia has also established domination over Belarus. Four months into the invasion of Ukraine, Putin compared himself to Russian emperor Peter the Great. He said that Tsar Peter had returned "Russian land" to the empire, and that "it is now also our responsibility to return (Russian) land". Kseniya Oksamytna wrote that in Russia media, the invasion was accompanied by discourses of Russian "supremacy". She says that this likely fuelled war crimes against Ukrainians and that "the behavior of Russian forces bore all hallmarks of imperial violence". The Putin regime has revived imperial ideas such as the "Russian world" and the ideology of Eurasianism. It has used disinformation and the Russian diaspora to undermine the sovereignty of other countries. Russia is also accused of neo-colonialism in Africa, mainly through the activities of the Wagner Group and Africa Corps.

=== Spain ===
The areas of the world that at one time were territories of the Spanish Empire

Spanish imperialism in the colonial era corresponds with the rise and decline of the Spanish Empire, conventionally recognized as emerging in 1402 with the conquest of the Canary Islands. Following the successes of exploratory maritime voyages conducted during the Age of Discovery, Spain committed considerable financial and military resources towards developing a robust navy capable of conducting large-scale, transatlantic expeditionary operations in order to establish and solidify a firm imperial presence across large portions of North America, South America, and the geographic regions comprising the Caribbean basin. Concomitant with Spanish endorsement and sponsorship of transatlantic expeditionary voyages was the deployment of Conquistadors, which further expanded Spanish imperial boundaries through the acquisition and development of territories and colonies.

==== Imperialism in the Caribbean basin ====
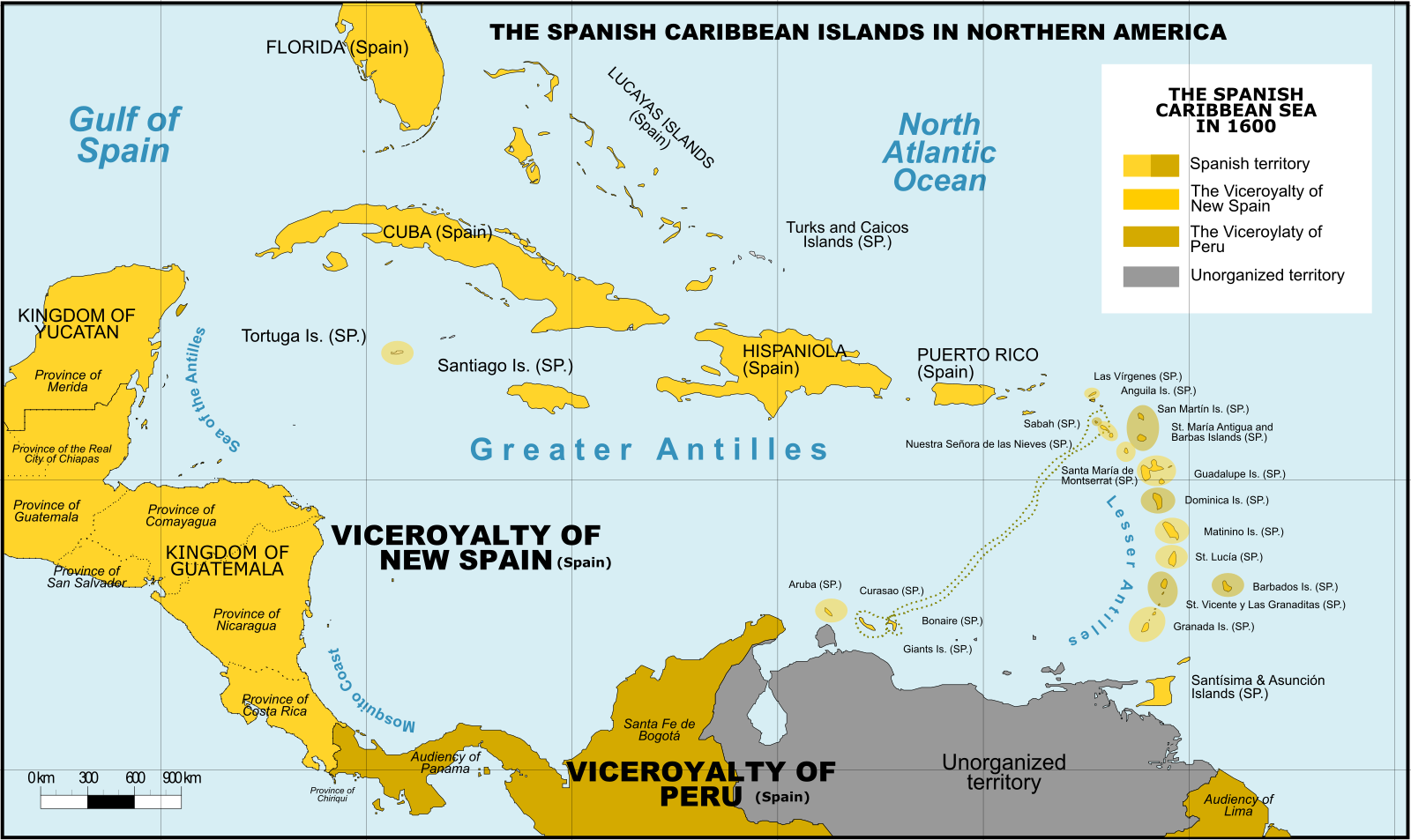
Spanish colonies and territories in the Caribbean basin (c. 1490 – c. 1660)

In congruence with the colonialist activities of competing European imperial powers throughout the 15th – 19th centuries, the Spanish were equally engrossed in extending geopolitical power. The Caribbean basin functioned as a key geographic focal point for advancing Spanish imperialism. Similar to the strategic prioritization Spain placed towards achieving victory in the conquests of the Aztec Empire and Inca Empire, Spain placed equal strategic emphasis on expanding the nation's imperial footprint within the Caribbean basin.

Echoing the prevailing ideological perspectives regarding colonialism and imperialism embraced by Spain's European rivals during the colonial era, including the English, French, and the Dutch, the Spanish used colonialism as a means of expanding imperial geopolitical borders and securing the defense of maritime trade routes in the Caribbean basin.

While leveraging colonialism in the same geographic operating theater as its imperial rivals, Spain maintained distinct imperial objectives and instituted a unique form of colonialism in support of its imperial agenda. Spain placed significant strategic emphasis on the acquisition, extraction, and exportation of precious metals (primarily gold and silver). A second objective was the evangelization of subjugated indigenous populations residing in mineral-rich and strategically favorable locations. Notable examples of these indigenous groups include the Taίno populations inhabiting Puerto Rico and segments of Cuba. Compulsory labor and slavery were widely institutionalized across Spanish-occupied territories and colonies, with an initial emphasis on directing labor towards mining activity and related methods of procuring semi-precious metals. The emergence of the Encomienda system during the 16th–17th centuries in occupied colonies within the Caribbean basin reflects a gradual shift in imperial prioritization, increasingly focusing on large-scale production and exportation of agricultural commodities.

==== Scholarly debate and controversy ====
The scope and scale of Spanish participation in imperialism within the Caribbean basin remains a subject of scholarly debate among historians. A fundamental source of contention stems from the inadvertent conflation of theoretical conceptions of imperialism and colonialism. Furthermore, significant variation exists in the definition and interpretation of these terms as expounded by historians, anthropologists, philosophers, and political scientists.

Among historians, there is substantial support in favor of approaching imperialism as a conceptual theory emerging during the 18th–19th centuries, particularly within Britain, propagated by key exponents such as Joseph Chamberlain and Benjamin Disraeli. In accordance with this theoretical perspective, the activities of the Spanish in the Caribbean are not components of a preeminent, ideologically driven form of imperialism. Rather, these activities are more accurately classified as representing a form of colonialism.

Further divergence among historians can be attributed to varying theoretical perspectives regarding imperialism that are proposed by emerging academic schools of thought. Noteworthy examples include cultural imperialism, whereby proponents such as John Downing and Annabelle Sreberny-Modammadi define imperialism as "...the conquest and control of one country by a more powerful one." Cultural imperialism signifies the dimensions of the process that go beyond economic exploitation or military force." Moreover, colonialism is understood as "...the form of imperialism in which the government of the colony is run directly by foreigners."

In spite of diverging perspectives and the absence of a unilateral scholarly consensus regarding imperialism among historians, within the context of Spanish expansion in the Caribbean basin during the colonial era, imperialism can be interpreted as an overarching ideological agenda that is perpetuated through the institution of colonialism. In this context, colonialism functions as an instrument designed to achieve specific imperialist objectives.

=== United States ===
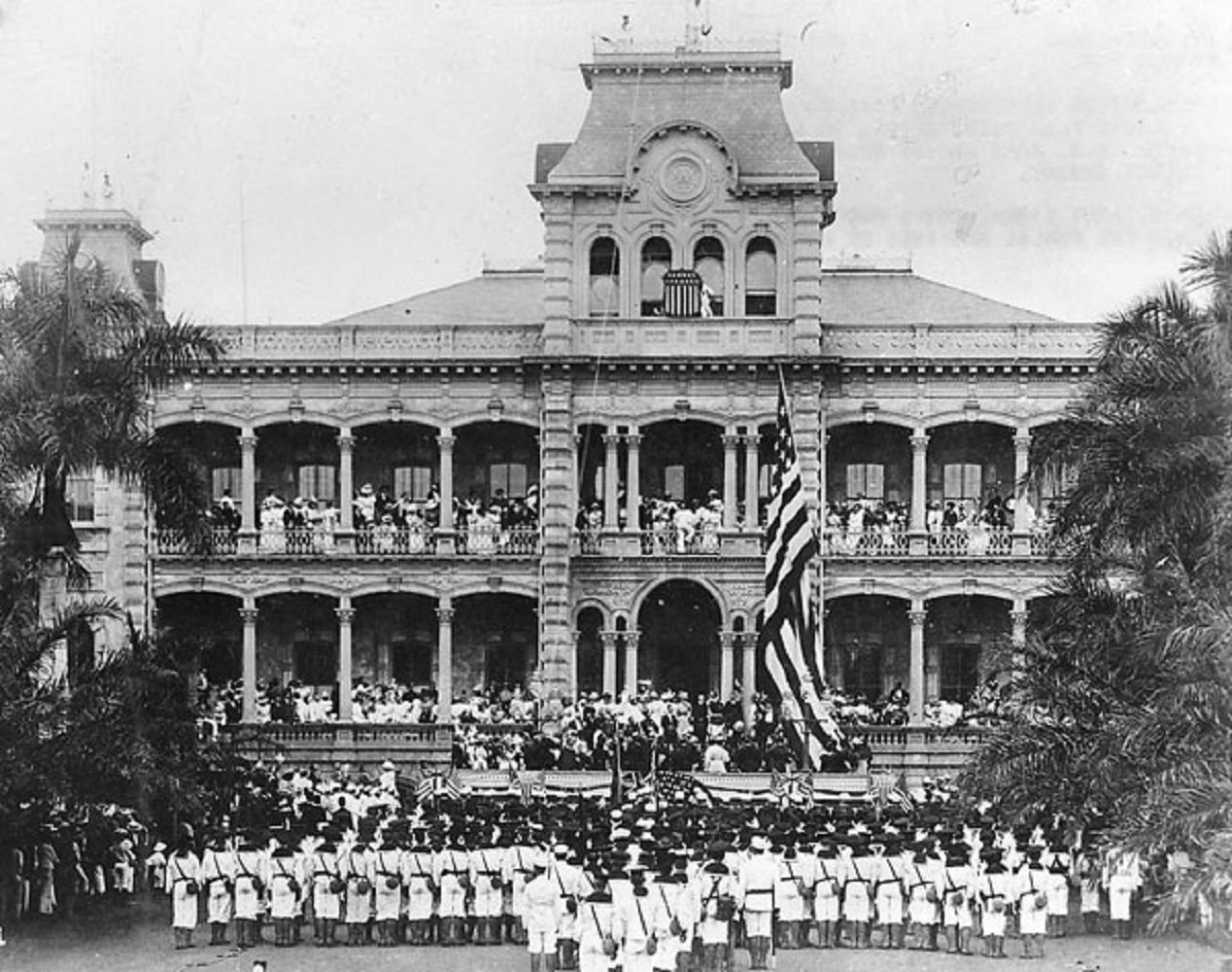
Ceremonies during the annexation of the Republic of Hawaii, 1898

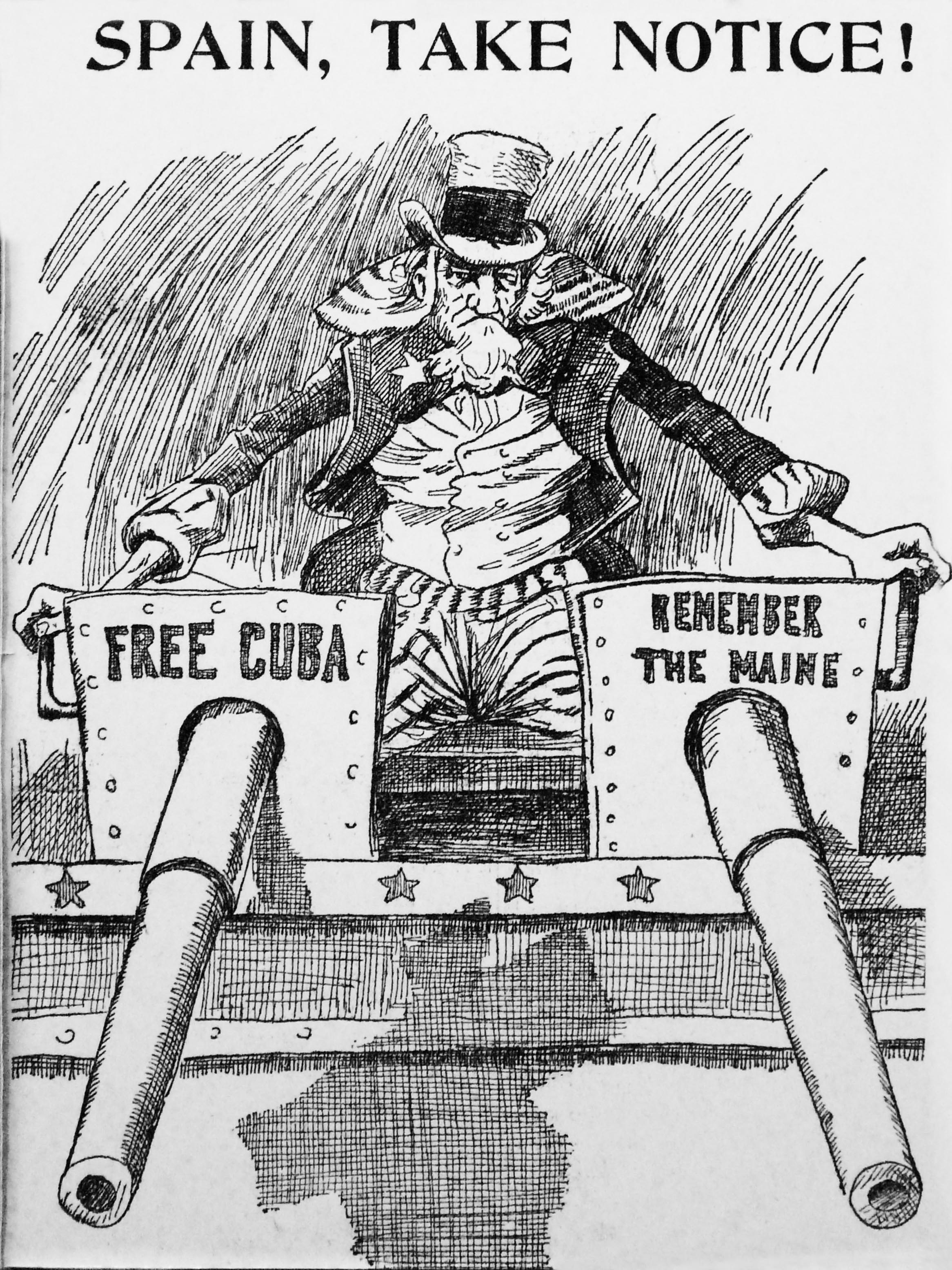
Cartoon of belligerent Uncle Sam placing Spain on notice, c. 1898

Made up of former colonies itself, the early United States expressed its opposition to imperialism, at least in a form distinct from its own Manifest Destiny, through policies such as the Monroe Doctrine. However the US may have unsuccessfully attempted to capture Canada in the War of 1812. The United States achieved significant territorial concessions from Mexico during the Mexican–American War. Beginning in the late 19th and early 20th century, policies such as Theodore Roosevelt's interventionism in Central America and Woodrow Wilson's mission to "make the world safe for democracy" changed all this. They were often backed by military force, but were more often affected from behind the scenes. This is consistent with the general notion of hegemony and imperium of historical empires. In 1898, Americans who opposed imperialism created the Anti-Imperialist League to oppose the US annexation of the Philippines and Cuba. One year later, a war erupted in the Philippines causing business, labor and government leaders in the US to condemn America's occupation in the Philippines as they also denounced them for causing the deaths of many Filipinos. American foreign policy was denounced as a "racket" by Smedley Butler, a former American general who had become a spokesman for the far left.

At the start of World War II, President Franklin D. Roosevelt was opposed to European colonialism, especially in India. He pulled back when Britain's Winston Churchill demanded that victory in the war be the first priority. Roosevelt expected that the United Nations would take up the problem of decolonization.

Some have described the internal strife between various people groups as a form of imperialism or colonialism. This internal form is distinct from informal U.S. imperialism in the form of political and financial hegemony. It also showed difference in the United States' formation of "colonies" abroad. Through the treatment of its indigenous peoples during westward expansion, the United States took on the form of an imperial power prior to any attempts at external imperialism. This internal form of empire has been referred to as "internal colonialism". Participation in the African slave trade and the subsequent treatment of its 12 to 15 million Africans is viewed by some to be a more modern extension of America's "internal colonialism". However, this internal colonialism faced resistance, as external colonialism did, but the anti-colonial presence was far less prominent due to the nearly complete dominance that the United States was able to assert over both indigenous peoples and African-Americans. In a lecture on April 16, 2003, Edward Said described modern imperialism in the United States as an aggressive means of attack towards the contemporary Orient, stating that "[this is] due to their backward living, lack of democracy and the violation of women's rights. The western world forgets during this process of converting the other that enlightenment and democracy are concepts that not all will agree upon".

== Anti-imperialism ==
Anti-imperialism gained a wide currency after the Second World War and at the onset of the Cold War as political movements in colonies of European powers promoted national sovereignty. Some anti-imperialist groups who opposed the United States supported the power of the Soviet Union, such as in Guevarism, while in Maoism this was criticized as social imperialism.

Pan-Africanism is a movement across Africa and the world that came as a result of imperial ideas splitting apart African nations and pitting them against each other. The Pan-African movement instead tried to reverse those ideas by uniting Africans and creating a sense of brotherhood among all African people. The Pan-African movement helped with the eventual end of Colonialism in Africa.

Representatives at the 1900 Pan African Conference demanded moderate reforms for colonial African nations. The conference also discussed African populations in the Caribbean and the United States and their rights. A total of six Pan-African conferences that were held, and these allowed the African people to have a voice in ending colonial rule.

== See also ==
- Analysis of Western European colonialism and colonization
- Fourteen Points esp. V and XII in 1918
- Historic recurrence
- Historiography of the British Empire
- Imperialism, the Highest Stage of Capitalism 1917 book by Lenin
  - Super-imperialism
  - Ultra-imperialism
- International relations (1648–1814)
- International relations (1814–1919)
- International relations (1919–1939)
- Iron law of oligarchy
- List of empires
  - List of kingdoms and empires in African history
- Mercantilism
- Might Makes Right
- Political history of the world
- Postcolonialism
- Right of conquest
- Scramble for Africa, in the late 19th century
- Imperialisms (by country)
  - American imperialism
  - Chinese imperialism
  - Russian imperialism
  - Timeline of European imperialism

== Sources ==
- Matthee, Rudolph P. (2017) [2008]. "Safavid Dynasty". In Yarshater, Ehsan (ed.). Encyclopædia Iranica (Online ed.). Encyclopædia Iranica Foundation.
- Morgan, David (2007). The Mongols (2nd ed.). Malden, MA; Oxford, England; Carlton, Victoria: Blackwell Publishing. ISBN 978-1-4051-3539-9.
- Newman, Andrew J. (2009) [2006]. Safavid Iran: Rebirth of a Persian Empire. I.B. Tauris. ISBN 9781845118303.
- Stein, Burton (2010), A History of India, John Wiley & Sons, ISBN 978-1-4443-2351-1.
- Streusand, Douglas E. (2011). Islamic Gunpowder Empires: Ottomans, Safavids, and Mughals. Westview Press. ISBN 978-0-8133-1359-7.
