= Cartel theory =

Study of the structure, formation, and effects of cartels

Cartel theory is usually understood as the doctrine of economic cartels. However, since the concept of 'cartel' does not have to be limited to the field of the economy, doctrines on non-economic cartels are conceivable in principle. Such exist already in the form of the state cartel theory and the cartel party theory. For the pre-modern cartels, which existed as rules for tournaments, duels and court games or in the form of inter-state fairness agreements, there was no scientific theory. Such has developed since the 1880s for the scope of the economy, driven by the need to understand and classify the mass emergence of entrepreneurial cartels. Within the economic cartel theory, one can distinguish a classical and a modern phase. The break between the two was set through the enforcement of a general cartel ban after Second World War by the US government.

== Definitions ==
Cartel is an ambiguous concept, which usually refers to a combination or agreement between rivals, but – derived from this – also designates organized crime. The main use of ‘cartel’ is that of an anticompetitive association in the economy. In politics, it refers to a temporary alliance of several parties in election campaigns, for example. The scientific analysis of cartels is done by cartel theory.

=== Different spellings ===
In other languages, "cartel" might have different spellings. It is called cartello in Italian, kartell in German, Hungarian and Estonian, kartel in Dutch, Turkish and Slavic languages, kartelli in Finnish, and kartelis in Lithuanian. Even in the same languages, the spelling has varied over time. In German, for example, the spelling has gone back and forth between the c-initial form and the k-initial form. Nevertheless, "cartel" is the most widespread worldwide because of its use in English, Spanish, French and Portuguese. Though there is no difference in meaning between "cartel" with a "c" and "kartel" with a "k", they are not always interchangeable. Some institutions and organizations differ in name mainly in this letter, like the Kartellverband katholischer deutscher Studentenvereine and the Cartellverband der katholischen deutschen Studentenverbindungen, which are both umbrella organizations of Catholic student associations in Germany.

=== Etymology ===
The word "cartel" has its root in the Greek χάρτης (= papyrus scroll, paper, map) and came about the Latin "charta" (see Magna Carta, the English medieval law), the Italian "cartello" (diminutive of carta = paper, map) and the French "cartel" into the English and German language. In the Middle Ages, it designated an agreement on the fighting rules in the knightly tournament, then for duels. Until the 18th century, also the rules for noble games and courtly contests were named so. In modern times, especially in the 18th and 19th centuries, the term "cartel" was also used for intergovernmental agreements of technical kind: The guiding idea of a conflict confining clause came to light in various treaties between belligerent states, such as "cartels" on the postal and Trade or the treatment of couriers, prisoners of war and deserters. It is not until about 1880 that the term "cartel" also means the restriction of competition between entrepreneurs. Initially, this usage was only spread in the German speaking countries in Europe. Only by and by, this novel word meaning was imported into neighboring languages (either as "Kartell" or "cartel") and by this the economic aspect became the predominant meaning of "cartel". In the 19th and 20th century, also social associations or political alliances were referred to as cartels, so the union of German student fraternities or the cartel parties or in the German Empire. In Belgium of the 20th and 21st century, there was the same naming for party alliances, e.g. "Vlaams Kartel". At the beginning of the 20th century, the socialist thinker Karl Kautsky saw the possibility of even a cartel between states that would replace the imperialist competition of the great powers and establish a peaceful ultra-imperialism.

=== Specific uses ===
The term ‘’cartel’’ is normally used in a specific context, resulting in a number of content variations. So there is:

- Cartels in business, formed by enterprises or other market players,
- Labor union cartels ("Gewerkschaftskartelle") as associations of several trade unions of the same locality, so in Germany of the late 19th and early 20th century,
- Cartels between states, example: OPEC or more generally treated in the state cartel theory,
- Party cartels in the sense of a cooperation of parties in elections and in parliament,
- Cartels as umbrella organizations of German speaking student's fraternities,
- Cartels as criminal organizations or mafia, examples: drug cartel, Medellín cartel
- Cartels between people, meant above all derogatory, e.g. the ‘cartel of the wicked' or the ‘silent cartel’,
- Cartels as intergovernmental agreements: From the 17th to 19th centuries, there were agreements between (competing or belligerent) states on the maintenance of postal and commercial traffic, the entry and exit of couriers, prisoners of war and deserters. They also could deal with a more rational enforcement of the Customs regulations by the right of the border guard authorities to be allowed to enter the territory of the neighboring state to persecute smugglers.

In addition, "cartel" or "Kartel" are used as names for distinct brands, business companies, music bands or works of art.

== Constituent characteristics and exclusion criteria for cartels ==
Cartels are not always easy to spot. To be able to reliably distinguish them as alliances between rivals from other forms of organization, the consideration of positive and negative indicators can be helpful.

Constituent criteria for cartels would be the following:

- The members are, at the same time, partners as well as competitors (so do e.g. enterprises, states, political parties, duelists, tournament knights). These members can be individual persons or organizations.
- The members of a cartel are independent of each other, negotiating their interests with each other and against each other. So there have to be at least two participants and they determine their interests autonomously.
- The members of a cartel know each other; they have a direct relationship, in particular they communicate with each other.

Exclusion criteria for cartels would be the following:

- There is a "hierarchical" or other strong "dependency relationship among the participants": a drug mafia that is organized hierarchically and managed by a single boss can't be a drug cartel in the sense of a real "cartel". Likewise, a business corporation can't be a "cartel" due to its central management, which controls its subsidiaries. Furthermore, an OPEC, in which all adherents would be dependent on the largest member (since long: Saudi Arabia) would no longer be a "cartel". Similarly, colonial empires from a motherland and colonies do not constitute a "state cartel".
- The union of competitors, in their entirety or via important members of its association, is dependent on an outside power. A strict, state-mandated compulsory cartel without freedom of choice between the partners would not be a (real) cartel. A suitable example is the "Deutsche Wagenbau-Vereinigung" (German Railway Cars Association), which was organized in the 1920s by the "Deutsche Reichsbahn" (German Imperial Railways) – its "market opponent".
- The combination takes place between actors of different levels. Thus, the concerted actions of employers’ associations and trade unions in some industrialized countries was not a cartel, because the allies there were no homogenous competitors.
- The alleged members of a suspected cartel do not know each other, but only randomly show a parallel behavior: “Cartels of the godless”, “cartels of maintenance deniers” or “silent cartels” are therefore usually no real cartels, but pure verbal abuse formulas.

== Classic cartel theory ==
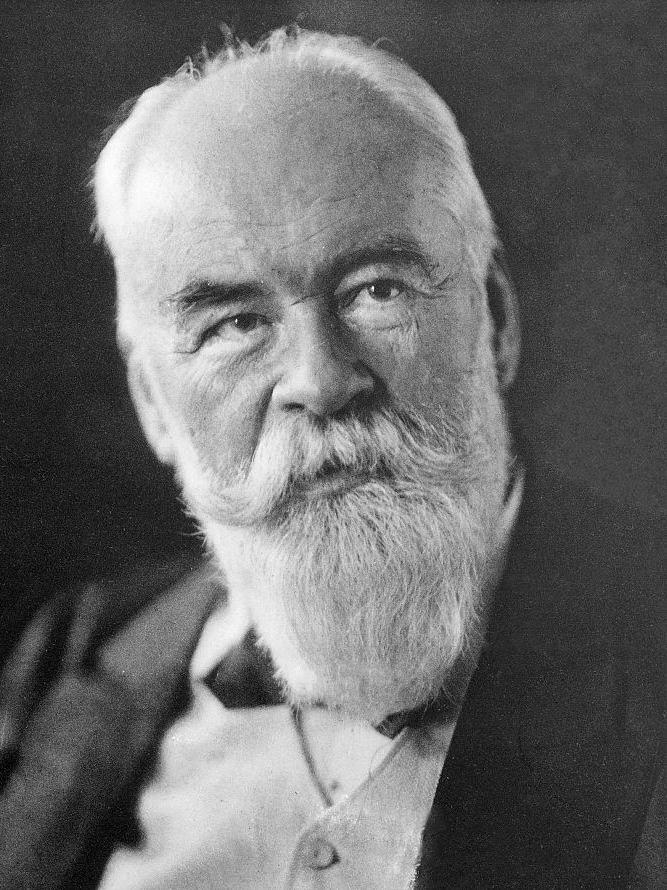
Gustav von Schmoller (1838-1917)

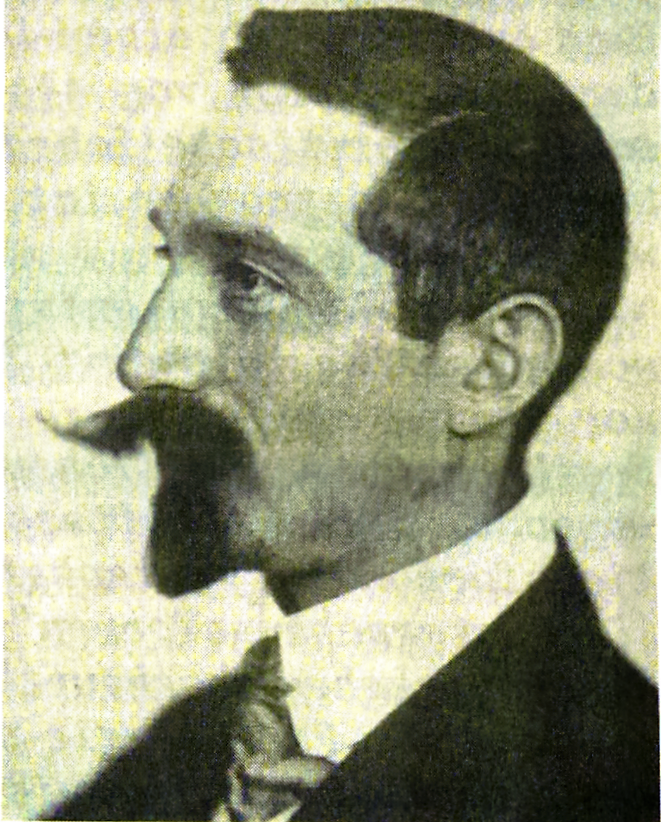
Robert Liefmann (1874-1941)

The origin of the usage of 'cartel' for entrepreneurial co-operations was the German speaking region of Central Europe. Already in the 1870, 'Cartell' came up for railway companies who unified their technical standards, pooled their stocks of railroad cars and coordinated their time schedules.

In 1883, an explanatory framework was based upon this novel understanding of "cartel": the classic cartel theory, which was in the same way of German origin: The Austro-Hungarian professor of economics Friedrich Kleinwächter had condensed a number of case studies to the draft of an empirical theory. Cartel theory remained for decades the product, above all, of Central European economists of German tongue. That approach was well-intentioned to the entrepreneurial cartels and in this respect was functionalist and institutionalist. It had its origin in the historical school of economics. The classic cartel theory itself went through three stages of development:

- an early one, partly naive, in which the "historical school of economics" strongly dominated (Gustav von Schmoller, Karl Bücher, Lujo Brentano),
- a middle one, which was characterized by the introduction of more economic theory (especially Robert Liefmann) and
- a late one that was influenced by the entry into the organized economy of the German Third Reich following the depression of 1929-1933 (see, for example, Heinz Müllensiefen).

== The theory variants of the non-German countries ==
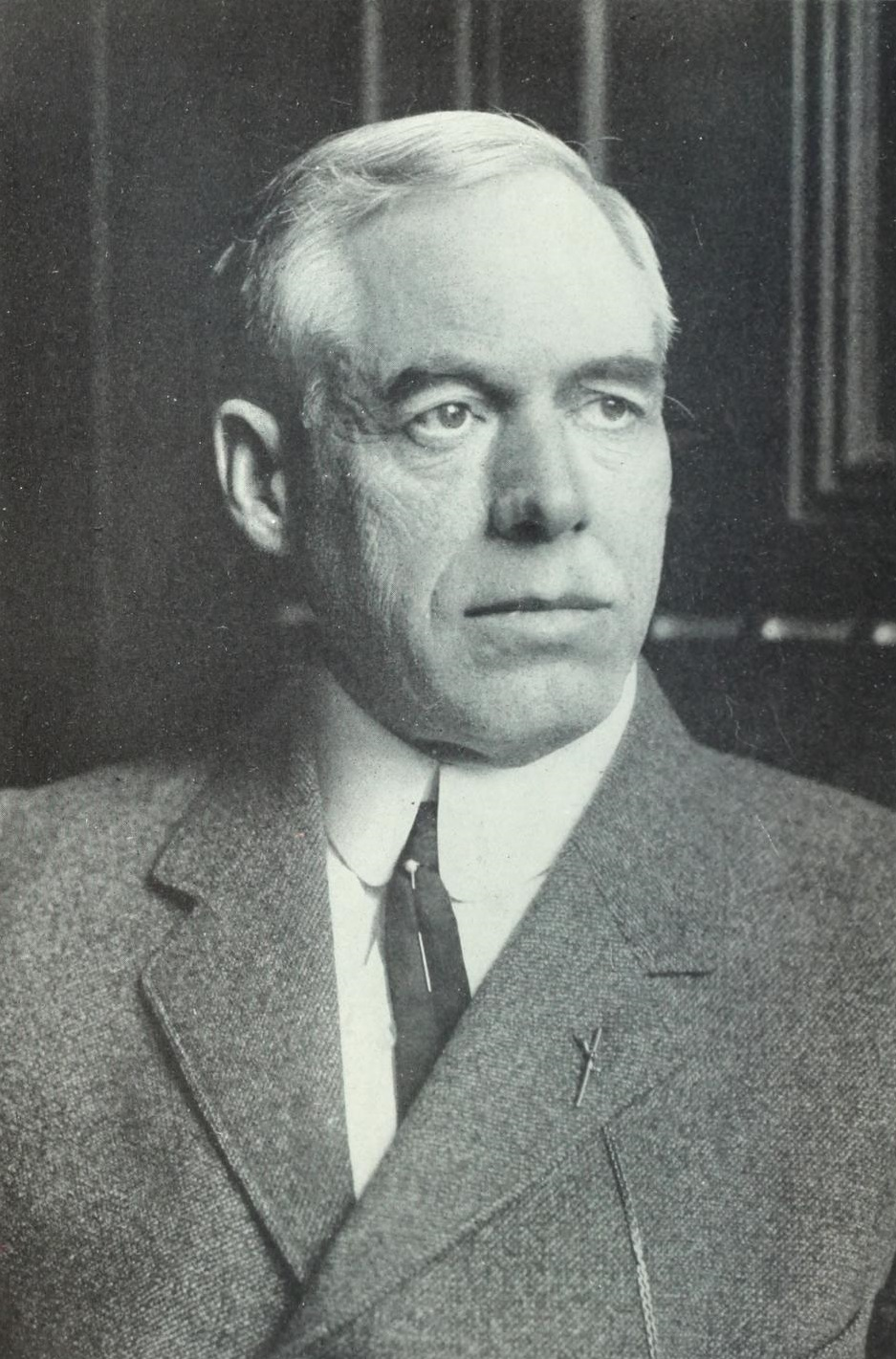
Jeremiah Jenks (1856–1929)

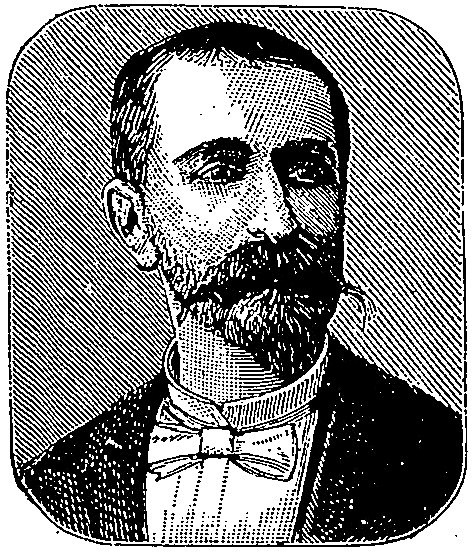
Francis Laur (1844–1934)

Outside of the German speaking countries, there were more or less similar theories of economic organization. These variants existed until the 1920s (in Italy until after 1945). However, they operated with different basic terms such as (in French) "syndicat", "accaparement", (in Italian) "sindacati", (in English) "combination" or "trust". In France Francis Laur and Paul de Rousiers, in Italy Francesco Vito, in the USA Jeremiah Jenks and in the United Kingdom Henry W. Macrosty as well as David H. MacGregor were authoritative writers on economic combinations.

== Modern cartel theory ==
The modern cartel theory, which followed the classical cartel doctrine is essentially of American origin (George J. Stigler and George W. Stocking in the 1940s) It was based on the liberal view upon economy, which already had coined the traditional antitrust concept of the 1890s. The modern doctrine rejects cartels more or less fundamentally and is therefore not much interested in the internal organization of existing cartels, which are combated (and therefore only loosely institutionalized). Subsequently, modern cartel theory is quite oriented to pure economic theory and to economic policy. The organizational-science aspects of the classical cartel theory did not find a continuation in modern cartel theory.

== Differences between the two cartel theories ==
Modern cartel theory points out - much more committed than the classical one - to the detrimental consequences of a lack of competition that leads to overpricing, misallocation of capital and slowing down of technical progress in the economy. In this context, this doctrine has helped to develop the paradigm of market failure, which must be avoided by means of an appropriate competition policy. On the other hand, the disadvantages of unrestrained competition - such as unnecessary bulk goods transport, unnecessary advertising for mature goods, brand sales strategies - are highlighted in the classic cartel theory. Thus, these two directions of cartel studies feature conflicting, mutually exclusive economic concepts and neither of them can ideally solve the fundamental problem of entrepreneurial competition.

Terminologically, classical cartel theory has yielded sophisticated definitions and classifications of cartel types that were based on material institutional criteria. By contrast, modern cartel theory is essentially normative. Its specific terminology depends on the respective competition law, its national version of the cartel ban and exemptions for useful cartels.

== Cartel systems theory, general cartel theory ==
According to an analysis by Holm Arno Leonhardt, classical cartel theory can be understood (after a deconstructive adjustment) as an interdisciplinary systems theory in the field of the social sciences. Abstracted from the concrete circumstances of the individual types of competition, an overarching theory of the social system 'cartel' emerges. Leonhardt defines this through nine basic statements on the factors arena, actors, interactions, structures, functions, equilibrium condition, driving forces, development path and system environment: Groups of independent, homogeneous actors are on certain arenas (action fields) on the way. Their egoism leads to competition and conflict. These are perceived as disturbing or threatening and lead to collusion on fairness rules and reconciliation of interests, e.g. by joint ventures. The adopted standards, agreements and projects need to be enforced and monitored, creating multi-stakeholder organizations – cartels. The equilibrium condition of the system is the win-win constellation: all members of a group want to benefit from it as well. The driving force that leads to cartel formation and successively condenses the associations on a development path to higher organizational forms is rationalization. The latter is only exhausted when an arena-wide organization has emerged and is fully developed, such as a trust corporation or a world state. In the economy this tendency is permanently suppressed by the competition policy of the state. There is no such instance in international relations, so that the world state perspective remains in force.

== Bibliography ==
- Harald Enke: Kartelltheorie. Begriff, Standort und Entwicklung. Tübingen 1972.
- Friedrich Kleinwächter: Die Kartelle. Ein Beitrag zur Frage der Organisation der Volkswirtschaft. Innsbruck 1883.
- Francis Laur: De l'accaparement. Essai doctrinal. 1900. Paris: Publ. scient. & industr.
- Jeremiah W. Jenks (1903): The trust problem. Several ed. 1900-03. New York: McClure.
- David H. MacGregor: Industrial combination. 1906. London: Bell.
- Henry W. Macrosty: The Trust movement in British Industry. A study of business organisation. 1907. London: Longmans, Green.
- Paul de Rousiers: Les Syndicats industriels de producteurs en France et à l'Étranger. Trusts-Cartells-Comptoirs-Ententes internationales. 2. ed. 1912. Paris: Colin.
- Robert Liefmann: Kartelle, Konzerne und Trusts. Several ed. within the 1920s.
- Robert Liefmann: Cartels, Concerns and Trusts. London 1932.
- Francesco Vito: I sindacati industriali. Cartelli e gruppi. 1930. Milano: Vita e pensiero.
- Arnold Wolfers: Das Kartellproblem im Licht der deutschen Kartellliteratur. München 1931.
- Robert Liefmann: Cartels, Concerns and Trusts. London 1932.
- Heinz Müllensiefen: Freiheit und Bindung in der geordneten Wirtschaft: Kartellgesetzgebung und Marktordnung in der gewerblichen Wirtschaft. Hamburg 1939.
- George J. Stigler: The extent and bases of monopoly. In: The American economic review, Bd. 32 (1942), S. 1–22.
- George W. Stocking: Cartels In Action (with M.W. Watkins). New York: Twentieth Century Fund 1946.
- George W. Stocking: Cartels or competition? The economics of international controls by business and government (with M. W. Watkins). New York: Twentieth Century Fund 1948.
- Wyatt C. Wells: Antitrust and the Formation of the Postwar World. New York 2002.
- Tony A. Freyer: Antitrust and global capitalism 1930–2004. New York 2006.
- Holm Arno Leonhardt: Kartelltheorie und Internationale Beziehungen. Theoriegeschichtliche Studien, Hildesheim 2013.
- Holm Arno Leonhardt: The Development of Cartel Theory between 1883 and the 1930s - from International Diversity to Convergence. Hildesheim 2018. Online-Ressource.
