= Holm Arno Leonhardt =

German academic (born 1952)

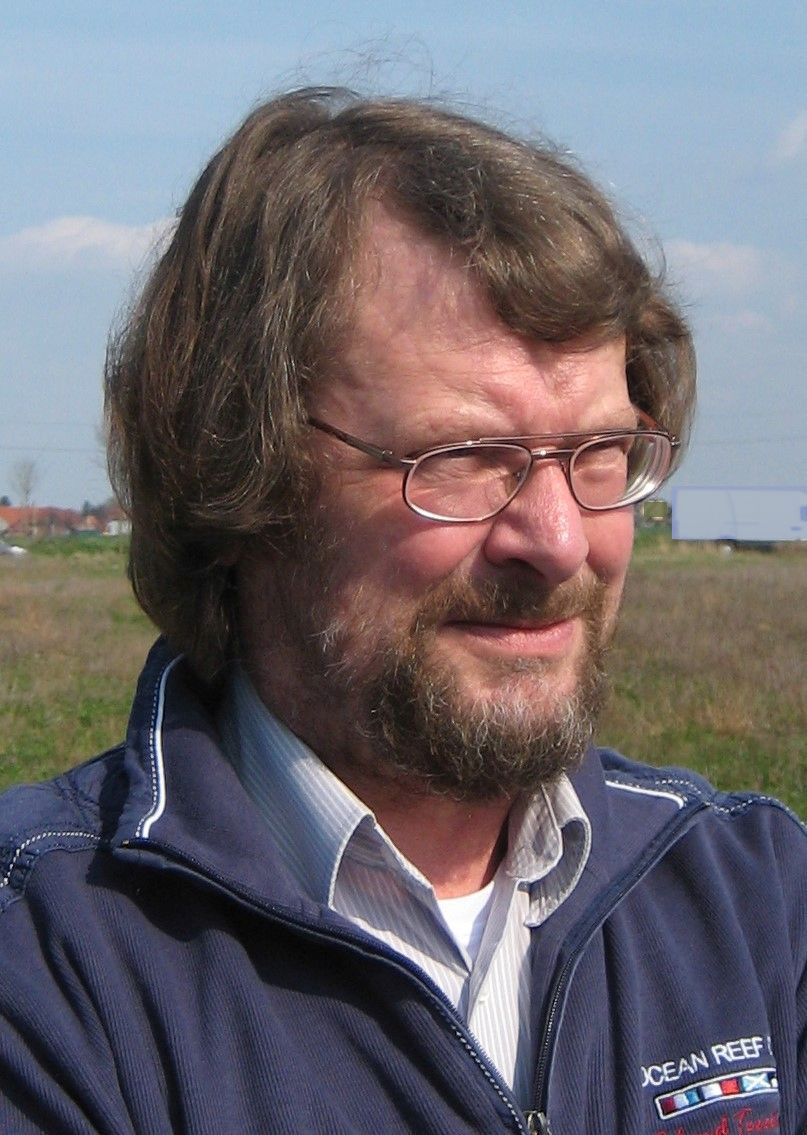
Holm Arno Leonhardt

Holm Arno Leonhardt (sometimes abbreviated to Holm A. Leonhardt; born 12 October 1952) is a German scientist in the fields of International Relations and economic history, especially in the realm of cartel history and theory. He was born in Manila (Philippines) the son of Brigitte and Arno Leonhardt. Arno became a German expatriate since 1930, moving up the career ladder from accountant to vice director in the branch office of an American paper machine company in Manila. Brigitte came from a liberal merchant family in Saxony (Germany) holding critical distance to the Nazi regime.

== Education and early scientific work ==
Leonhardt studied politics, sociology, economic theory and public law at the German universities of Göttingen and Hannover. In 1983, he completed his PhD at University of Bremen with a work on «political conflicts in the European Community 1950–1983». Subsequently, he published a number of subject-related articles.

== Professional life as an academic librarian ==
To make a living, Leonhardt started to be educated and to work as an academic librarian (1985–2018). His professional thesis of 1987 was about the distinction of archival, librarian and museum materials. Since 1989 he was occupied at the Library of Hildesheim University, where he more and more concentrated on subject cataloguing. 2015–2018, he created a new type of library classification for cultural studies to be able to classify books according to a multiple-arts cultural aesthetics.

== Later academic research ==
From 2007 on, Leonhardt continued active research work shifting to the field of economic history and economic organization. Since the 1970s, he became interested in cartels as a special phenomenon of social organization. For this comeback to research, Leonhardt has been advised by the Hildesheim historian Michael Gehler from the Institute of History at Hildesheim University. Since 2008, Leonhardt again published several subject related articles and in 2013 a comprehensive work on «Cartel theory and International Relations» being «theory-historical studies».

== Research profile and methodology ==
Leonhardt has worked interdisciplinary combining social, economic, juridical and cultural sciences. He has applied a structural-functional method of analysis. In his recent studies he additionally used ideology-critical and linguistic methods for the deconstruction of scientific concepts and tenets. In terms of rule and power, he has applied marxist argumentations of class rule, political hegemony and imperialism.

Leonhardt has a favourite research perspective: the competition or rivalry between social actors. Already in his study about the European community, he used the inter-governmental rivalry about power potentials (economic, military and political factors) as leading concept. Later. In his engagement for cartel theory, he focused on the internal competition between the cartel members. Particularly for international relations, he gave examples about relevant analytical gaps which other authors had left out of recognition.

== Central results and theses ==
- Cartels = a widespread social constellation - Social actors almost never have exactly the same interests, but more or less tensions among each other. Thus, the perspective of competition and (for an organized solution) of cartel building can be applied. The author stands for a wide definition of ‹cartel› in the sense of an ‹alliance of rivals›. To him, all coalitions to pursue special interests can be analyzed as cartels. Typical for such associations, the economic as well as the non-economic ones, is their permanent management of conflicts and interests.
- IGOs = cartels - International inter-governmental organizations can be set equal with cartels. For Leonhardt this is true for organizations like the United Nations, the European Union and the NATO.
- Some NGOs = cartels - Also international NGOs (if non-hierarchical) can be set equal with cartels. Among them the International Federation of Association Football or the World Council of Churches can be named as examples.
- Not all so-called „cartels“ are cartels – An inflexible scientific understanding has led to difficulties in differentiation. Subsequently, complex structures like price fixing of the second level have been simplified to a „cartel“. Similarly, state controlled formations have been named „cartels“, when they set prices and quantities, such as the „compulsory cartels“ working for governmental targets.
- "Cartel" stands unter ideological suppression - The subject ‘cartel’ underwent a defamation process or negative ideological turn since the end of WW II: “After World War II, cartels were – according to the American antitrust norm of ‹trade restrictions› – criminalized rather soon and then were generally declared as obsolete. The word ‹cartel› became a formula for condemnation, used for instance for ‹drug cartels› or for the assertion, Auschwitz had been run by a cartel, namely the ‹I.G. Farben Industries› (which actually was no cartel, but a corporate group).›.” Because of this, an unbiased debate and scientific work on cartels is difficult to reach.
- Cartel buildings are excluded from monument protection - The rejection of the subject ‘cartel’ has gone so far that the historical heritage is in danger: there is almost no monument protection of former cartel buildings as a historical heritage. Leonhardt complaints that occasionally such business facilities have been torn down without much thought. The former central-selling-syndicates for commodities may have employed hundreds of office workers for marketing operations and sales administration. So, these bodies often domiciled in large and representative premises which might be historically informative now. But: “On none of those former cartel headquarters there is a commemorative plaque telling: Here, in bygone times, there had been a sales cartel for steel, coal, potash ...”
- A novel cartel theory? – Has Leonhardt set up a new cartel theory? - This is not really clear from the statements of the scholarly scene. - Leonhardt himself only claimed to have made some necessary adjustments to the self-contradictory corpus of classical cartel theory. However, he did make profiled and original statements about the nature of intergovernmental organizations and international relations, but again he referred to older thinkers like Karl Kautsky and others who had already outlined the vision of an ultra-imperialism or a cartel of mighty states in the early 20th century. Anyhow, interested scientists like Kleinschmidt, Roelevink, Schroeter and Berghahn actually understood Leonhardt's endeavor as a trial of a "new theory" or theoretical improvements.

== The directional dispute about Cartel History Studies ==
In his 2013 book about cartel theory, Leonhardt had criticized the newer cartel history studies as affected by neoliberal influence. In the broad average, the intellectual level of the formerly famous and brilliant German cartel theory had not been maintained. Analytic and conceptual flaws were to be found in a number of post-war publications. The research perspectives often suffered from an uncritical attitude to the American anti-cartel policy since Second World War. This criticism became an issue in a counter-critical review by Eva Maria Roelevink, who vetoed strongly. In a response to her utterances, Leonhardt attributed her to a “Bochum school” of business history, which was to him the leading network, which stood for a more or less biased understanding of cartels and cartel history. Causal for this, he contended, was an unreflected proximity to the doctrines of neoliberalism and American scientific leadership. This dispute led in 2016/17 to a series of five articles by Leonhardt, Roelevink and the three senior scholars Volker Berghahn, Harm Schröter and Martin Shanahan (Univ. of Australia). Several positions of the Leonhardt book were taken up in these articles.

== Bibliography (in selection) ==
- Europa konstitutionell. Politische Machtkämpfe in der EG 1950–1983, Hannover 1983 (PhD. Bremen), xii, 529 pp.
- Die Bundesrepublik Deutschland in der EG. Der "dumme August" der Integration? in: Frankfurter Hefte, 1983, issue 10, pp. 17–25.
- Legitimation und Zukunft des Europäischen Parlaments. In: Universitas, 1984, issue 3, pp. 247–256.
- Deutsche Interessen und europäische Integration. In: Civis, 1984, issue 2, pp. 25–34.
- Zur Europapolitik der Grünen. In: Zeitschrift für Politik, 1984, issue 2, pp. 192–204.
- Was ist Bibliotheks-, was Archiv- und Museumsgut? Ein Beitrag zur Katalogisierung von Dokumentationsgut und -institutionen. In: Bibliotheksdienst 23 (1989), pp. 891–904.
- Zur Geschichte der Ultraimperialismus-Theorie 1902–1930. Die Ideengeschichte einer frühen Theorie der politischen Globalisierung., 32 pp.
- Die Europäische Union im 21. Jahrhundert. Ein Staatenkartell auf dem Weg zum Bundesstaat? In: Michael Gehler (ed.), From Common Market to European Union Building. 50 years of the Rome Treaties 1957–2007, Wien 2009, pp. 687–720.
- Kartelltheorie und Internationale Beziehungen. Theoriegeschichtliche Studien. Hildesheim 2013, 861 pp.
- Regionalwirtschaftliche Organisationskunst. Vorschlag zur Ergänzung des NRW-Antrags zum UNESCO-Welterbe. In: Forum Geschichtskultur Ruhr 2013, issue 2, pp. 41–42.
- Deutsches Organisationstalent. Zu den wirtschaftshistorischen Wurzeln eines nationalen Stereotyps. In: Zeitschrift für Wirtschaftsgeographie 59 (2015), issue 1, pp. 51–64.
- Die Europäische Wirtschafts- und Währungsgemeinschaft als Sanierungsgemeinschaft. In: Michael Gehler et alii (ed.): Banken, Finanzen und Wirtschaft im Kontext europäischer und globaler Krisen. Hildesheim [u.a.] 2015, pp. 591–672.
- Zum Richtungsstreit in der Kartellgeschichtsforschung (On the directional dispute in cartel history research). In: Zeitschrift für Unternehmensgeschichte 61 (2016), issue 1, pp. 107–115. DOI: 10.17104/0342-2852-2016-1-107.
- Die Entwicklung der Kartelltheorie+ zwischen 1883 und den 1930er Jahren – von internationaler Vielfalt zur Konvergenz. Hildesheim 2016, 83 pp.
- Systematik „Ästhetische Kulturwissenschaft“ an der Universitätsbibliothek Hildesheim. Ein Innovationsbericht. In: o-bib. Das offene Bibliotheksjournal 5 (2018), issue 3, pp. 118–134.
- The development of cartel+ theory between 1883 and the 1930s – from international diversity to convergence. Hildesheim 2018, 94 pp.

== Secondary literature ==
- Berghahn, Volker R. (2016): Einige weiterführende Gedanken zu Holm A. Leonhardts Kartelltheorie und Internationale Beziehungen (= Some further thoughts on Holm A. Leonhardt's [book] „Cartel theory and International Relations“). In: Zeitschrift für Unternehmensgeschichte/Journal of Business History, vol. 61, issue 1, p. 121-126.
- Gehler, Michael: Vorwort des Herausgebers . In: Leonhardt: Kartelltheorie und Internationale Beziehungen. Theoriegeschichtliche Studien. Hildesheim 2013, pp. 17–25.
- Kleinschmidt, Harald. "Holm Arno LEONHARDT, Kartelltheorie und internationale Beziehungen" (PDF). uni-hildesheim.
- Roelevink, Eva-Maria (2016): Warum weniger eine neue Theorie als vielmehr eine neue empirische Kartellforschung notwendig ist (= Why less a new theory [by Leonhardt] than rather a new-empirical cartel research is necessary). In: Zeitschrift für Unternehmensgeschichte/Journal of Business History, vol. 61, issue 1, p. 116–120.
- Schröter, Harm G. (2017): ‘'Quo vadis Kartelldiskurs?”. In: Zeitschrift für Unternehmensgeschichte/Journal of Business History, vol. 62, issue 2, p. 302-309.
- Shanahan, Martin (2017): On Academic debate. A comment on the discussions between Leonhardt, Roelevink and Berghahn. In: Zeitschrift für Unternehmensgeschichte/Journal of Business History, vol. 62, issue 2, p. 299-301.
