= Cartel (disambiguation) =

A cartel is a tight organization based on a formal agreement among commercial enterprises with conflicting interests.

Cartel may also refer to:

== Various cartels ==
- Cartel, adopted from Dutch language Kartel (electoral alliance), a public and formal electoral alliance between political parties (hence, cartel parties)
- Cartel party theory, evaluates influences among state and political parties (hence, cartel parties)
- Drug cartel, a drug trafficking organization (the article lists specific cartels)
- State cartel theory, addresses international relations formed by states (hence, cartel states)
- Cartel (intergovernmental agreement)

== Music ==
=== Groups and labels ===
- Cartel (band), an American pop punk band
- Cartel (rap group), a Turkish hip hop group
- The Cartel (record distributor), a network of record distributors in the UK

=== Albums ===
- Cartel (Cartel album), the band's self-titled album
- Cartel (hip hop album), a German 1995 compilation album

== Film ==
- Cartel (web series), a 2021 webseries on ALTBalaji
- Cartels (film), a 2017 action film starring Steven Seagal
- The Cartel, a 2010 documentary film by Bob Bowdon that covers the failures of public education in the United States by focusing on New Jersey

== Other uses ==
- Cartel (concept), an ambiguous concept, which usually refers to a combination or agreement between rivals
- Cartel (intergovernmental agreement), spread throughout the 17th to 19th centuries in the Western world
- Cartel (ship), a vessel engaged in a humanitarian voyage, such as the exchange of prisoners
- Galindo cartel, a cartel that figures largely in Sons of Anarchy (season 4) and the spinoff series Mayans M.C.
- The Cartel, a professional-wrestling stable in the Global Wrestling Federation in the 1990s
- cartel, historically, a written letter of defiance or challenge
- Cartel, a 1980 non-fiction book by Edward Jay Epstein

== See also ==
- Cartell, an Irish vehicle checking company
- El Cartel (disambiguation)
- Kartel (disambiguation)
- Kartellen, Swedish gangsta-rap and hip hop formation
