= The Path Which Led Me To Leninism =

Essay by Ho Chi Minh

- Author: Ho Chi Minh
- Translator: Foreign Languages Publishing House
- Language: Vietnamese, English
- Publisher: Foreign Languages Publishing House
- Published: April 1960

The Path Which Led Me To Leninism is a short essay by Vietnamese President Ho Chi Minh that describes his first encounter with Lenin's analysis of the colonial question and his ultimate acceptance of Marxism-Leninism and communist revolution. Throughout the essay, Ho Chi Minh describes his experiences in the French Communist Party and details his personal acceptance of Marxism–Leninism. The essay is notable throughout Vietnam and within Marxist circles for its endorsement of Leninism and anti-Imperialism.
