= Intergovernmental Council of Copper Exporting Countries =

Map of members

The Intergovernmental Council of Countries Exporters of Copper (CIPEC) (French Conseil intergouvernemental des pays exportateurs de cuivre) was created in 1967 in Lusaka with the objective of coordinating policies of the country members looking for growth in the revenues coming from copper.

CIPEC has been characterized as unsuccessful because of the availability of substitute minerals and the availability of scrap copper.

== Composition ==
It was initially constituted with four members, Chile, Peru, Zaire and Zambia. A further four were added to the cartel in 1975 - Australia, Indonesia, Papua New Guinea and Yugoslavia.

CIPEC represented around 30% of the world's refined copper, and more than 50% of the proven reserves of copper. The intent of the members to secure higher prices failed, particularly of increasing the price during the crisis of 1975-1976, and the subsequent change in Chile's economic system finally ended the cartel.

Many experts consider that the market power of this cartel was negligible, because the residual demand that it faced was elastic (much higher than OPEC, for example). The inability of coordinating output cutbacks during the extensive period of life of CIPEC seems to validate this hypothesis. It was dissolved during the 1990s.

== CIPEC stages ==
There were three stages of the CIPEC that economists recognize:

- Nationalization stage (1967–1973)
- Unilateral Action stage (1973–1976)
- Reflux stage (1976–1988)

== Environmental conditions for CIPEC ==
The OPEC embargo marked a turning point in the history of the international copper trade, waking up the countries that depended strongly on their exports of commodities. They desired to imitate the behavior of CIPEC with the objective of increasing the prices of their commodities.

Motivated by Rio Tinto Zinc (RTZ), in November 1974 in Lusaka the members of CIPEC reached an agreement to reduce copper exports by 10% -- later increased to 15% -- until the first half of 1976. The high incentives meant that the countries did not fully complete the agreement and in fact in this period only 300,000 tons of copper were reduced by the cartel — hardly half of the reductions contemplated in the agreement. High inventories and the growth of sources outside of the cartel prevented the policies adopted by CIPEC from giving benefit to its members.

== See also ==
- Copper cartels
- International Copper Study Group
