= State cartel theory =

State cartel theory is a new concept in the field of international relations theory (IR) and belongs to the group of institutionalist approaches. Up to now the theory has mainly been specified with regard to the European Union (EU), but could be made much more general. Hence state cartel theory should consider all international governmental organizations (IGOs) as cartels made up by states.

== Terminology ==
The term cartel in state cartel theory means – in very short words – an alliance of rivals. It is used in a neutral, strictly analytical way, not as a degradation. The terminology has been predominantly adopted from the old historical cartel theory of pre-World War II Europe. But additionally these terms have been checked and sometimes adjusted in their meanings to be able to incorporate political and governmental functions as cartel functions of the combined states.

== Methodological base and scientific background ==
State cartel theory is a hybrid design made up of two or more theories, assembled in an adequate way.

The method of theory creation consists of three steps:

1. The starting material of a state cartel theory is the intellectual corpus of a broad existing theory of international relations. For instance the following theories might be adaptable: the realism, the neofunctionalist Europe-science, or even a Marxist imperialism theory. Their statements on the relationships between the industrialized nation states are called into question as these are thought to be ideologically biased and therefore these are marked up for revision and change.
2. The losses and vacancies are now to be refilled by another theory, the classical cartel theory of economic enterprises. This theory, made up mainly in Germany, was authoritative in Europe till the end of World War II and was pushed aside globally by the American anti-trust policy up to the 1960s. The classical cartel theory comprised an elaborate organizational theory of the cartel institution. Its knowledge of the relationships among the cartelized enterprises and between them and the common cartel institutions are now to be applied. Hence, the classical economic cartel theory serves as a tool kit for repairing the ideological deformations and corruptions of the existing theories of IR.
3. In a third step the transfer results were rechecked in the light of available facts of international relations and they were stated more precisely and with greater differentiation.

In the final outcome a theory gets built, which – like the cartel theory of economic enterprises – based on the utilitarian image of man. Thus, state cartel theory is strictly determined by socio-economic factors. Since this approach prevents ideological influences it is not – neither evidently nor in a hidden or subtle manner – connected with the interests of any existing great power.

The philosophical precondition of the specified knowledge transfer from cartel theory is the – one century old – insight, that there are striking analogies between combinations of states and combinations of economic enterprises (i.e. the cartels formerly legal and of a great number in Europe). These analogies are both institutionally and functionally adept.

== History of the state cartel conception ==
The conception of international relations as potential cartel phenomena has a long tradition:

- John Atkinson Hobson, a left-liberal British economist, suggested between 1902 and 1938, imperial antagonisms could be pacified in a system of 'inter-imperialism', if the great powers would "learn the art of combination" ('combination' or 'combine' were at those times used to designate cartels).
- Karl Kautsky, one of the leading theoreticians of social democracy before World War I, believed that since 1912, the great powers – beginning with the British Empire and the Deutsche Reich – would unite into a 'state cartel' giving them organization and reconciliation within an ultra-imperialism – an idea, that was an illusion at that time.
- Early Commentators of the European unification described the organizational system of the Schuman Plan in 1950 as 'cartel-like'; the Corriere della Sera, a respected Italian newspaper, understood the aim of the proposal as to build a cartello anticartello, i.e., a states’ cartel to eliminate the private cartels in the coal and steel sectors.

The cartel concept for closer forms of inter-state cooperation was counteracted by just a range of actors: by Leninism, American anti-trust policy and European federalists (e.g., Jean Monnet). This conception was first blamed, then ignored, and by the 1960s increasingly forgotten.

== Central conclusions and basic instruments ==
The breakthrough phase: The historical origin of a wider political cartelization is identified in the crisis of the capitalist system after World War II. The breakdown of the anarchic – or imperialistic – world system in 1945 marks the beginning of the comprehensive inter-state cartelization of the western world. The extreme material, political and human losses and sacrifices led the nations – or more precisely: their ruling classes – to the conclusion that war and protectionism should not be used any more as weapons against each other to assure the survival of the free western world. This culminated in the General Agreement on Tariffs and Trade coming into force rather than in service of mankind on 1 January 1948.

The cartel relationship: The analysis of relations among the combined states is a basic instrument of state cartel theory. The aim is to identify the extent of their cooperation, of common interests on the one hand, and the amount of their competition, the dimension of divergence of their interests on the other hand. This is carried out essentially contrary to existing statements of the conventional theories of IR, e.g. the argument of interstate 'friendship' – which is the idealist or functionalist position – or a human drive for power – which is the realist position. This way, the basic relationship between the cooperation seeking capitalist states can be recognized as a quite rational, but also difficult friendship-rivalry, a relationship of cooperation and antagonism. The Franco-German friendship can be seen as a paradigm for this and many examples of its ambivalence have been quoted.

Hegemony analysis: The supremacy of the greater states – like that of the bigger enterprises – leads to overproportional assertiveness and thus to privileges for these actors obtained by persuasion or by force. On the other hand, integration brings about dependencies binding all participants. So there is a structure of symmetric and asymmetric connections, which can be found both inside and outside of the respective state cartels. The analysis of these complex forms of international relations is in the focus of state cartel theory and can lead to a global analysis of state cartels and state cartel effects. A not considered aspect is the "disrupter", often manifesting itself in opposition to real or perceived grievance brought to bear, at little relative cost, to its effect such as the attacks on the World Trade Center where two aircraft as weapons brought to sharp focus world attention the power of a new terror.

== Institutions and theory of ideology ==
The organizational structure: In enterprise cartels the members' assembly was always the historically first and main institution of the combination. All further institutions had serving functions (secretary, bodies for market regulation, arbitration board) and were the result of the will and the needs of the members. This structure can be found alike in the combinations of states: the council of ministers or delegates is the members' assembly of the participating states (e.g. the Council of the European Union), it has a secretariat, there are operative commissions (e.g. the European Commission), and there can be an arbitration board/court (e.g. the European Court). Additional institutions could be developed – in enterprise as in state cartels – according to needs.

On the democratic character of the European Union: The European Parliament is – according to state cartel theory – a less important, not really indispensable multifunctional communitarian institution of EU: The most obvious function is the orchestration of a European democracy; at this, the democratic pretensions of parties and citizens of the member states are to be served symbolically – meaning: they often get sent to nowhere. Another function is the provision and application of more EU-expertise by the representatives of the single member states, being an additional channel to import national interests into the communitarian system. Finally, the European Parliament is able to influence the EU legislation slightly by its rights of participation: it can actually bias and improve decisions, which otherwise would be made exclusively by the mighty council, and this would often happen according to the notorious principle of the least common denominator. A significant increase in the rights of the parliament would challenge the system and pose the question: cartel or federal state. A process like this, which could really override the cartel-logic, could only develop with the support or at the instigation of a strong dominant group of member states.

Theory of ideology: While national-imperialist ideologies of the pre-1945 era being abolished, international institutions (state cartels) today spread an ideology of interstate cooperation: "Since war and protectionism should fall away as means of policy, a different stile of contact becomes necessary between the partner states. […] The nationalism of former days is repressed by an ideology of international understanding and friendship. The European Spirit gets evoked particularly in context of the European Union. The commandments of international understanding and European Communitarianship are the lubricant in the mechanics of the bargaining process in the state cartel. As ideologies they often make the relations look much better than they really are, but as appeals or instructions they could be eminently valuable. […] The Origin of the communitarian ideology in its pure occurrence are the central institutions of the EU, its commission and its parliament."

== Functions and results of integration ==
The functional typology: The enterprise cartels of former times framed markets according to their interests, state cartels frame policies. While the aims of the standardization activities can be different, the methods and instruments of private and state cartels are often similar and always analogically comparable. Thereby the functional typology of the classical enterprise cartels is applicable also for interstate regulative communities. This typification by the purpose of the cartel can be demonstrated by means of the example of the European Union:

- the European common agricultural market has instruments similar to a – normally forbidden – production cartel typically controlling prices and outputs.
- the miscellaneous market regulations of EU, but also its health care and environmental standards, can be seen to correspond to standardization cartels, partially also to conditions cartels.
- the settlements on maximum prices for cell phone calls within Europe constitute a supranationally decreed calculations cartel.

The cartel gain: Cooperating within international institutions normally provides the participating states with substantial benefits. "The cartel gain of the EU consists of the various gains in prosperity, which result from economic integration and now make the member states adhere like being glued together. Any far-reaching disintegration, trying to go back to national autarchy, would invariably lead to an economic crisis, for which the Great Depression [in Europe] of 1929/33 should have been just a slight forerunner." Transnational corporations and export-oriented national enterprises plus their employees and suppliers constitute a social power, which would hinder a breaking apart of the community. On the other hand, the cooperation in the state cartel is complicated because of distributional conflicts.

Tendencies for crises: According to state cartel theory inter-state organizations typically develop severe problems and crises. The European Union is seen to be in a permanent crisis. The causes for this are thought to lie in the clashes of increasingly unbridgeable interests between the participating nations or just plain cupidity. The EU – as a particularly advanced cartel combine – would strike more and more against a systemic barrier of development, i.e. could only be upgraded effectively by a change-over of power, by a federal revolution, in which the cartel form will be conquered and a federal state – with its considerable potentials for rationalization – will be erected.

== Compatibility with other theories of international relations ==
State cartel theory suggests:

- an intense rivalry among the developed industrialized states for socio-economic reasons,
- a partial (not complete) resolvability of these contradictions within the framework of international institutions or – in other words – by the cartel method,
- the power of the nation states as the crucial force within international political relations.

Thereby state cartel theory is partially in accordance or in opposition:

- to the neofunctionalist Europe-science and the communitarian method of Jean Monnet: The belief in the resolvability of the inner-European divergences of interests, in the feasibility of an efficient and conciliable Europe, is criticized by state cartel theory as naíve-idealistic. On the other hand, both integration theories agree with regard to the importance they attach to institution-building in state communities.
- to Leninist imperialism theory: The allegation of antagonistic rivalry between the developed capitalist states should be wrong, certainly since World War II. These states could definitely cooperate enduringly and abstain from open violence in their relationships. But state cartel theory and imperialism theory accord in the belief that societal interests are caused by socio-economic factors, thus eventually depending on the economy.
- to theories of International Relations with a pro-American bias: In the hegemony analysis of a state cartel theory it is always the look at the most powerful nations (i.e. globally the USA) which is most important. – Whitewashing of America as 'good strong power' as done in realism (by Morgenthau: the USA were not in a consistent pursuit of hegemony) or the methodical deferment of the power aspect as in the mainstream of both regime theory and global governance approach would be contrary to a state cartel theory.

== Bibliography ==
  - --- on State Cartels resp. the European Union
- Holm A. Leonhardt: Die Europäische Union im 21. Jahrhundert. Ein Staatenkartell auf dem Weg zum Bundesstaat? [A State Cartel on the Way to the Federal State?], in: Michael Gehler (Ed.), Vom Gemeinsamen Markt zur Europäischen Unionsbildung. 50 Jahre Römische Verträge 1957–2007 [From Common Market to European Union Building], Wien 2009.
- Holm A. Leonhardt: Zur Geschichte der Ultraimperialismus-Theorie 1902–1930. Die Ideengeschichte einer frühen Theorie der politischen Globalisierung [On the History of Ultra-Imperialism Theory]. Institute of History, Hildesheim Universität (Germany) (available since 1-20-2008).
  - --- on Classical Cartel or Trust Theory [usable more or less as compendiums of classical cartel thinking]
- Arnold Wolfers: Das Kartellproblem im Licht der deutschen Kartellliteratur [The Cartel Problem in the Light of the German Cartel Literature], München 1931.
- Robert Liefmann, Cartels, Concerns, and Trusts, London 1932.
- Jeremiah W. Jenks, The Trust Problem, New York 1900.
