= Kartel =

Kartel may refer to:

- Kartel, Liquor Store, a store in Barangka Ibaba, Mandaluyong
- Kartel, Maharashtra, a village in Ratnagiri district, Maharashtra state, India
- Kartel (electoral alliance), Dutch term for an electoral alliance between two or more parties in Belgium
- The Kartel, professional wrestling tag team made up of Terry Frazier and Sha Samuels

== Music ==
- Kartel Records is a Malaysian hip-hop record label
- Vybz Kartel (born in 1976), real name Adidja Palmer, Jamaican dancehall artist, songwriter and businessman
- Juke Kartel, (now London Cries), a rock band from Melbourne, Australia
- Van Coke Kartel, Afrikaans punk rock band from Cape Town, South Africa
- Kartellen, Swedish gangstarap and hip hop band

== See also ==
- Cartel
- Cartel (disambiguation)
- Kariel
