= Kleinwächter =

Kleinwächter is a surname. Notable people with the surname include:

- Friedrich Kleinwächter (1838–1927), Austrian economist
- Norbert Kleinwächter (born 1986), German politician
