= El Cartel =

El Cartel may refer to:

== Film and television ==
- El Cartel de los Sapos (film) (The Snitch Cartel), a 2011 Colombian crime film
- El Cartel (TV series), a 2008 Colombian TV series

== Music ==
- El Cartel Records, record label

=== Albums ===
- El Cartel (album), a 1997 compilation album featuring Daddy Yankee
- El Cartel II, a 2001 compilation album by Daddy Yankee
- El Cartel: The Big Boss, a 2007 album by Daddy Yankee

== See also ==
- Cartel (disambiguation)
