= Compulsory cartel =

A compulsory cartel or forced cartel is a cartel that is established or maintained by an administrative order or by a legal directive. The interference of policies on these associations of entrepreneurs of the same trade varied. It ranged from a mere decision to establish a cartel or to maintain an existing one, to a strict state control.

== Disagreement over the nature of compulsory cartels ==
The understanding of “compulsory cartels” as “cartels” has always been disputed. While the older cartel experts before the 1930s usually insisted in the free entrepreneurial will that constituted a “cartel”, later authors were more tolerant and accepted forced cartels as an exception. In recent times (2007), the economic-historian Jeffrey R. Fear took this stance of the “exception to the rule” that would not contradict the general nature of these organizations. The cartel-historian Holm Arno Leonhardt has positioned himself more differentiated in 2013: Forced cartels that were embedded in a totalitarian planning economy or were by other means unable to realize their own will, should be regarded as organs or appendages of another system. Thus, “compulsory cartels” without a permanent political influence could indeed constitute real “cartels”, while others being under strict control acted mainly as servants of an alien will.

== Examples ==
- German potash syndicate: This was since 1919 a public-law body and was integrated into a control structure with its customers, laborers, traders and instances of administration.
- Japanese steel cartel of the 1930s.
- Rhenish-Westphalian Coal Syndicate, Northwest Germany: This too was since 1919 a public body and integrated into a similar control structure as the German potash syndicate.
- Russian sugar syndicate of the 1890s.

== See also ==
- Coercive monopoly
- Government-granted monopoly

== Bibliography ==
- Fear, Jeffrey R.: Cartels. In: Geoffrey Jones; Jonathan Zeitlin (ed.): The Oxford handbook of business history. Oxford: Univ. Press, 2007, p. 268-293.
- Leonhardt, Holm Arno: Kartelltheorie und Internationale Beziehungen. Theoriegeschichtliche Studien, Hildesheim 2013.
- Korrell, Emil: Zwangskartelle als Mittel gegen ruinöse Konkurrenz. Forchheim 1937.
- Liefmann, Robert: Cartels, Concerns and Trusts, Ontario 2001 [London 1932]
