= Ultra-imperialism =

Marxist term for peaceful capitalism

Ultra-imperialism (occasionally hyperimperialism and formerly super-imperialism, not to be confused with Michael Hudson's book of the same name) is a potential, comparatively peaceful phase of capitalism, meaning after or beyond imperialism. It was described mainly by Karl Kautsky. Post-imperialism is sometimes used as a synonym of ultra-imperialism, although it can have distinct meanings.

== Origin of the term ==
The suggestion of a possible ultra-imperialism is normally attributed to Karl Kautsky, the leading theoretician of the Social Democratic Party of Germany (SPD) in the era of Imperial Germany. Kautsky coined the term in 1914, but he had speculated on the issue several times in 1912 already. He postulated that in the field of international relations a "stage [approaches], in which the competition among states will be disabled by their cartel relationship". Thus, Kautsky's ultra-imperialism concept was shaped by the idea of cartels made up by states for the purpose of international policy.

However, the basic idea of a possible pacification of imperialism did not really originate from Kautsky. The British left-liberal John Atkinson Hobson had written in 1902 in a similar context about a potential inter-imperialism which could be established by a combination of great powers (combination or combine then being used to designate cartels). In 1907, Karl Liebknecht stated in his brochure Militarismus und Antimilitarismus that "a trustification of all actual and potential colonies among the colonial powers, so to speak, [...] a disabling of the colonial rivalry among the states [could take place in the future], as it occurred to some extent for the private competition among capitalist entrepreneurs in the cartels and trusts". On the eve of World War I, these peace-loving social-democrats and liberals in Europe hoped that the great powers—beginning with the British Empire and the German Reich—would unite into a states' cartel or a combination of states giving the rivals organization and reconciliation.

The expression super-imperialism first appeared in November 1914 as an inaccurate translation of the newly coined German term Ultra-Imperialismus. William E. Bohn, the translator of Karl Kautsky’s article "Der Imperialismus" ("The Imperialism"), seemed to believe that the terms Kartell and Ultra-Imperialismus were not reasonable for the audience of the International Socialist Review, an American Marxist journal. Bohn faced a double problem as cartels were much less familiar in the United States than the concern-like, tauter organized trust entities and the word ultra, which in English means "exaggerated" or "extreme". Thus, he paraphrased Kautsky's ideas in terms more familiar to American readers, somewhat distorting Kautsky's statement. Together with the revival of the imperialism debates in the 1970s, the term super-imperialism recovered, but was modified in its content. It served now to describe the domination by the super-power United States within a system of imperialism in which the other imperialist powers were set back in their abilities and thus were second-class. Super-imperialism is hence a Marxist term with two possible meanings. It can refer:

- to the hegemony of an imperialist great power over its weaker rivals, which in this context become sub-imperialisms
- to a comprehensive supra-structure above a set of theoretically equal-righted imperialist states. This meaning is the older one but had become rare by the middle of the 20th century.

Since the same time, the German term Ultraimperialismus was translated into English literally with ultra-imperialism and was now used to describe a rather equal-righted inter-imperialist cooperation.

== Karl Kautsky's statements in 1914 ==
In 1914, Kautsky published an article on imperialism which subsequently was translated into English and published in the United States. In these, he argued there could be a way out of direful wars among the imperialist powers, a solution now named ultra-imperialism or super-imperialism.

Kautsky elucidated this thought in the September 1914 issue of Die Neue Zeit. He described the current phase of capitalism as imperialism. In Marxist theory, imperialism consists of capitalist states superexploiting labour in agrarian regions in order to increase both the imperialist nation's productivity and their market. However, imperialism also required capitalist states to introduce protectionist measures and to defend their empires militarily. He believed that this was the ultimate cause of World War I.

Kautsky noted that before the war while industrial accumulation had continued, exports had dropped as a result of a tendency of industry to expand out of proportion to agriculture. He stated that growing nationalism in the more industrially advanced colonies would necessitate a continuation of the arms race after the war and that should this occur, economic stagnation would worsen.

In Kautsky's view, the only one way in which capitalists would be able to maintain the basic system while avoiding this stagnation would be for the wealthiest nations to form a cartel in the same manner as which banks had co-operated, agreeing to limit their competition and renounce their arms race in order to maintain their export markets and their systems of superexploitation. In doing so, he postulated that war and militarism were not essential features of capitalism and that a peaceful capitalism was possible.

== Vladimir Lenin's criticism ==
Vladimir Lenin disagreed with Kautsky's approach. In an introduction to Nikolai Bukharin's Imperialism and World Economy written in 1916, he conceded that "in the abstract one can think of such a phase. In practice, however, he who denies the sharp tasks of to-day in the name of dreams about soft tasks of the future becomes an opportunist".

Lenin developed Bukharin's theories of imperialism and his own arguments formed the core of his work Imperialism: The Highest Stage of Capitalism. He wrote that Kautsky's theory supposed "the rule of finance capital lessens the unevenness and contradictions inherent in the world economy, whereas in reality it increases them". He gives examples of disparities in the international economy and discusses how they would develop even under a system of ultra-imperialism. He asks under the prevailing system "what means other than war could there be under capitalism to overcome the disparity between the development of productive forces and the accumulation of capital on the one side, and the division of colonies and spheres of influence for finance capital on the other?"

== Recent positions on the idea of ultraimperialism ==
Some Marxists have pointed out similarities between the co-operation between the capitalist states during the Cold War and ultra-imperialism. Martin Thomas of Trotskyist Workers Liberty points out that "since the collapse of the Stalinist bloc in 1989-91, that 'ultra-imperialism' has extended to cover almost the whole globe". Thomas goes on to say that it is not simply "a sharply polarised world of industrial states on one side, agrarian states on the other, with the industrial states joining together to keep the agrarian states un-industrial by force". Rather, "it is a very unequal but multifarious system, with political independence for the ex-colonies, rapidly-permuting new international divisions of labour, and many poorer states exporting mostly manufactured goods".

Opponents of the theory of ultra-imperialism argue that whatever similar forms may have existed during the Cold War, since its end inter-capitalist competition has tended to increase and that the nature of capitalism makes it impossible for capitalists to make conscious decisions to avoid behaviour if in the short term it proves beneficial.

== Related theories ==
State cartel theory, a new concept in the field of international relations theory, uses the basic conception of Kautsky's ultra-imperialism, but it is not a Marxist theory.

== See also ==
- Military–industrial complex
- New Imperialism
- Permanent war economy
- World-systems theory

== Literature ==
- Michael Hudson: Super Imperialism. The Economic Strategy of American Empire (Third Edition), Islet, 2021. ISBN 978-3981826098
- Dan Jakopovich, In the Belly of the Beast: Challenging US Imperialism and the Politics of the Offensive
- Karl Kautsky, "Der Imperialismus," Die Neue Zeit, 11 September 1914; 32 (1914), Vol. 2, p. 908–922.
- Karl Kautsky, "Imperialism and the War," trans. William E. Bohn, International Socialist Review [Chicago, IL: 1900] 15 (1914).
- Karl Kautsky, "Ultra-imperialism," trans. unknown, New Left Review I/59 (1970), 41–46.
- V.I. Lenin, Imperialism: The Highest Stage of Capitalism, Russia 1917.
- Holm A. Leonhardt: Bibliographie zur Ultraimperialismus-Theorie. Bibliography on Ultraimperialism Theory. In: Homepage des Instituts für Geschichte der Universität Hildesheim http://www.uni-hildesheim.de/media/geschichte/Bibliographie Ultraimperialismustheorie.pdf.
- Holm A. Leonhardt: Zur Geschichte der Ultraimperialismus-Theorie 1902–1930. Die Ideengeschichte einer frühen Theorie der politischen Globalisierung. In: Homepage des Instituts für Geschichte der Universität Hildesheim http://www.uni-hildesheim.de/media/geschichte/Geschichte Ultraimperialismustheorie.pdf (available since January 20, 2008).
- Bob Rowthorn: Imperialism in the Seventies: Unity or Rivalry? , in: New Left Review, 59 (1971).
- Martin Thomas: Introduction to Kautsky's "Ultra-imperialism: a debate". in "Ultra-imperialism", Workers Liberty 2002.
- John A. Willoughby: The Lenin-Kautsky Unity-Rivaly Debate, in: Review of Radical Political Economics. Vol. 11, 1979, Issue 4, p. 91–101.
