= International Nickel Study Group =

Intergovernmental organization

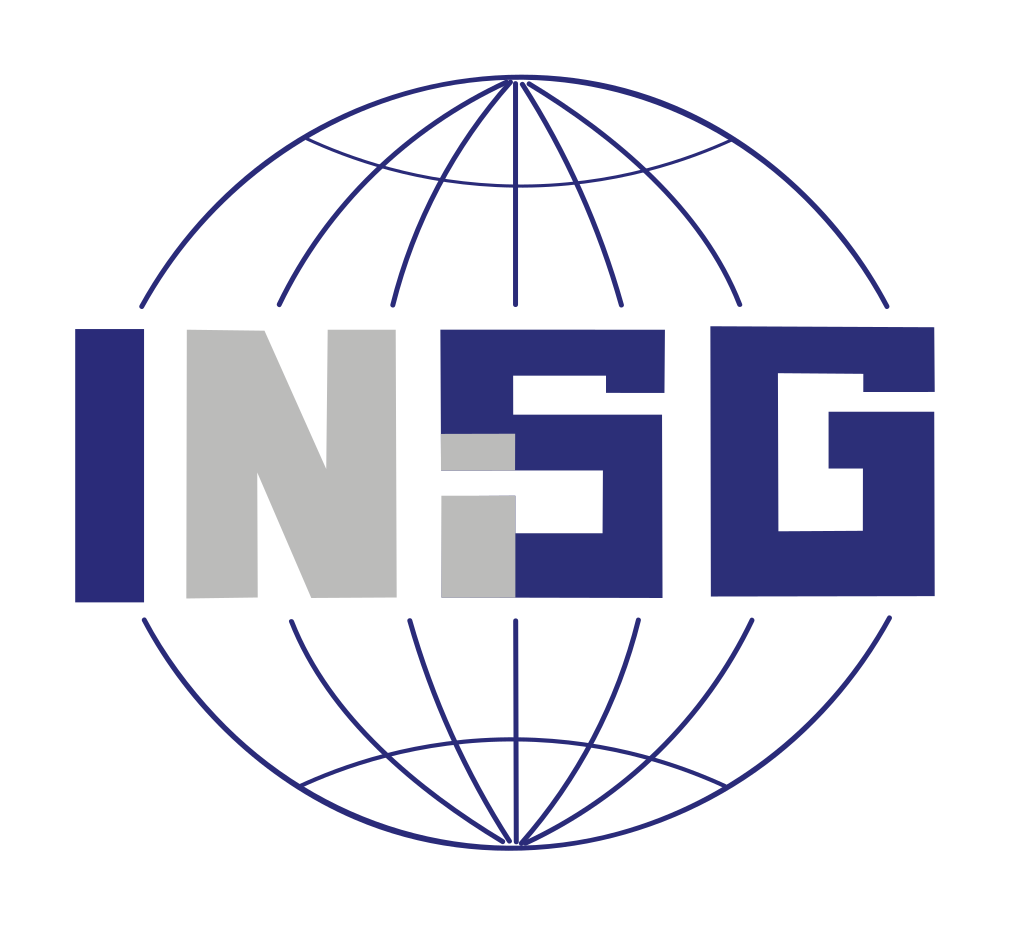
- Abbreviation: INSG
- Formation: 1990
- Type: Intergovernmental Organization
- Legal status: Active
- Purpose: Promote transparency in the global nickel market
- Headquarters: Lisbon, Portugal
- Secretary-General: Kamila Slupek
- Website: https://www.insg.org

The International Nickel Study Group (INSG) is an intergovernmental organization established in June 1990, in The Hague, Netherlands, within the framework of the United Nations. Since 2006, the International Copper Study Group and International Lead and Zinc Study Group have been co-located with INSG in Lisbon, Portugal.

== Creation ==
Between 1979 and 1986, a series of conferences between nickel producing and using countries were organized to consider the quality of nickel statistics and ways of improving them. These conferences were followed by the United Nations Conference on Nickel (October–November 1985 and April–May 1986), where the terms of Reference of The International Nickel Study Group were created (13 May 1986).

== Functions ==
As an International Study Group, the INSG provides a forum for market participants to discuss and exchange information on issues related to a specific commodity (nickel), without market intervention, with the goal of improving market transparency.

Specifically, this is done by monitoring the nickel economy, exchanging information with members, developing studies on specific issues, to "improv[e] the information available on the international nickel economy".

Currently, the most visible work of the INSG are statistics (World Nickel Statistics) and forecasts for the nickel market, being commonly cited or referred in industry news, studies on commodities and company reports and presentations.

== Members ==
Members of the INSG are Governments of nickel producing and consuming countries. Membership is open to countries with interest in nickel production, consumption or trade as well as "intergovernmental organizations with responsibilities in respect of the negotiation, conclusion and application of international agreements, particularly commodity agreements".

Current members of the INSG are:

- Australia
- Brazil
- Cuba
- European Union
- Finland
- France
- Germany
- India
- Italy
- Japan
- Norway
- Portugal
- Russian Federation
- Sweden
- United Kingdom
