= Kleinwachter's conundrum =

Economical Theoretical Problem

Kleinwachter's conundrum refers to a hypothetical which illustrates the difficulties in constructing an income tax that equitably taxes gains from consumption. It emphasizes differences among individuals which are beyond their control; specifically, it focuses on differences in working conditions and differences in personal preferences.

The hypothetical was posed by Friedrich Kleinwächter and popularized by Henry Simons.

== The Conundrum ==
Kleinwachter's conundrum imagines two equally salaried employees: an ordinary military officer and a flügeladjutant (a regimental aide-de-camp) to the sovereign. First, imagine that the flügeladjutant "receives quarters in the palace, food at the royal table, servants, and horses for sport. He accompanies the prince to theatre and opera, and, in general, lives royally at no expense to himself and is able to save generously from his salary." To complicate this problem, suppose further that the flügeladjutant detests opera and hunting. How, Kleinwächter asks, can they be equitably taxed?

== Revived by Henry Simons ==
The conundrum was popularized by Henry Simons, who mentioned it in his tax treatise, Personal Income Taxation. In illustrating this point, Simons referred to this one of several hypotheticals posed by Kleinwächter.

== Consequences for tax policy ==
Simons laments that the problem this example poses to equitable taxation "is clearly hopeless": To omit all compensation in kind is clearly inappropriate. On the other hand, to include the perquisites implies that all income should be measured with regard for the subjective relative pleasureableness of diverse activities—the negation of measurement.

Because it is difficult to measure actual utility from personal consumption (which includes in-kind benefits consumed by employees, but also leisure time, and the imputed income from self-performed services and ownership of consumer durables), tax policy seeks to sensibly and fairly delimit the concept of income in the context of the taxation of in-kind benefits by developing guidelines that balance equity, neutrality, and administrability. Brooks analyzes the treatment of taxation of employee benefits in Canada in these areas: employer-subsidized university education, subsidized dual-purpose employment and pleasure trips, subsidized clothing, subsidized parking, frequent flyer points collected on subsidized business trips, and employee discounts. Brooks concludes that the taxable value of the benefits provided to the flügeladjutant can be determined using tax policy guidelines.
