= International Lead and Zinc Study Group =

Intergovernmental organization

- Abbreviation: ILZSG
- Formation: May 1959
- Type: Intergovernmental Organization
- Legal status: Active
- Purpose: Promote transparency in the global lead and zinc markets
- Headquarters: Rua Almirante Barroso, 38
- Location: Lisbon, Portugal
- Coordinates: 38°43′54″N 09°08′34″W
- Region served: Worldwide
- Members: 25 countries and the European Union
- Secretary-General: Kamila Slupek
- Parent organization: affiliated to the United Nations
- Funding: member countries and publication sales

The International Lead and Zinc Study Group (ILZSG) is an intergovernmental organization originally established within the framework of the United Nations (UN) that aims to provide a forum for discussion of issues related to these metals and to ensure market transparency through the exchange of data and provision of research. It was the first to be established of three similar UN organizations now based in Lisbon, the others being the International Copper Study Group and the International Nickel Study Group.

== History ==
The ILZSG was founded in New York in May 1959, following a resolution of the United Nations Economic and Social Council in 1958. It was initially hosted in the UN headquarters in New York, moving to London in 1977 as an independent intergovernmental organisation. It has been based in Lisbon since 2006. Membership is open to UN member countries that are substantially involved in the production, consumption, or trade in lead and zinc. Members represent about 90% of production and consumption of the two metals.

== Activities ==
The ILZSG organizes regular intergovernmental meetings on international trade in the two commodities; provides, in a monthly bulletin, a continuous flow of statistical information on supply, demand, stocks, prices, and trade flows, together with forecasts of future developments; carries out studies of the world market situation for lead and zinc; and seeks to resolve any problems identified. It operates through several sub-committees, covering areas such as statistics and forecasting; mining and smelting; environmental issues and relevant legislation; and recycling.

Activities are carried out in close coordination with industry representatives. There is an industry advisory panel and businesses are invited to take part in the intergovernmental meetings. Observer organizations include the United Nations Conference on Trade and Development (UNCTAD), the United Nations Industrial Development Organization (UNIDO), and the United Nations Environment Programme (UNEP), as well as industry and consumer organizations and representatives of non-member countries.

== Publications ==
ILZSG produces regular reports and publications, including:

- Lead and Zinc Statistics – Monthly Bulletin
- World Directory: Primary and Secondary Lead Plants
- World Directory: Primary and Secondary Zinc Plants
- World Directory: Lead and Zinc Mines
- The Market for Lead
- Environmental Regulations Affecting Lead
- Lead and Zinc New Mine and Smelter Projects
- World Zinc Oxide and Zinc Dust Production and Usage

== Members ==
As of January 2026, there are 25 national members of the ILZSG:

- Australia
- Belgium
- Brazil
- Bulgaria
- China
- Finland
- France
- European Union
- Germany
- India
- Ireland
- Italy
- Japan
- Korea, Republic of
- Mexico
- Morocco
- Namibia
- Norway
- Peru
- Poland
- Portugal
- Russia
- Serbia
- Spain
- Sweden
- Turkiye

=== Former members ===
- United States
