= Imperialism, the Highest Stage of Capitalism =

1917 book by Vladimir Lenin

Imperialism, the Newest Stage of Capitalism
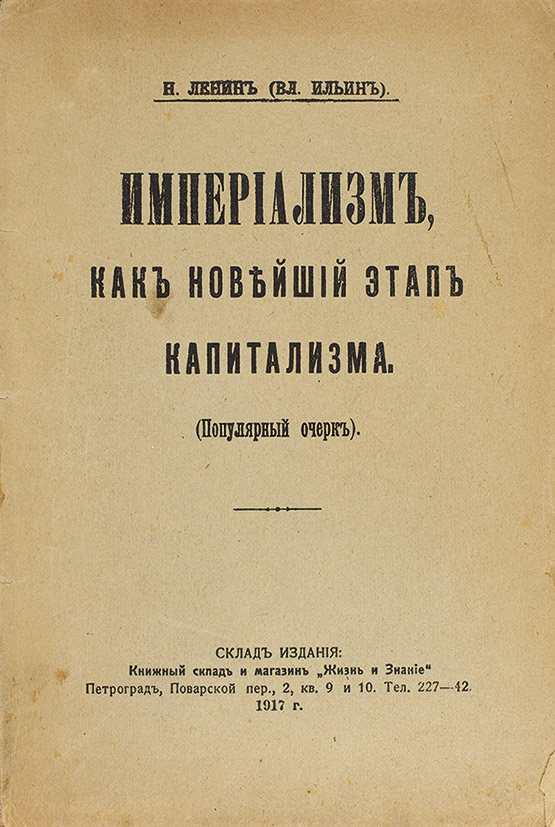
- Cover of a Russian first edition
- Author: Vladimir Lenin
- Original title: Имперіализмъ какъ новѣйшій этапъ капитализма
- Language: Russian
- Genre: Political economy, economic theory
- Published: 1917
- Publication place: Russian Republic
- Text: Imperialism, the Newest Stage of Capitalism at Wikisource

Imperialism, the Highest Stage of Capitalism, (Note: Russian: Империализм как высшая стадия капитализма, romanized: Imperializm kak vysshaja stadija kapitalizma) originally published as Imperialism, the Newest Stage of Capitalism, (Note: Russian: Имперіализмъ какъ новѣйшій этапъ капитализма, romanized: Imperializmʺ kakʺ novějšij etapʺ kapitalizma) is a book written by Vladimir Lenin in 1916 and published in 1917. It describes the formation of oligopoly, by the interlacing of bank and industrial capital, in order to create a financial oligarchy, and explains the function of financial capital in generating profits from the exploitation colonialism inherent to imperialism, as the final stage of capitalism. The essay synthesises Lenin's developments of Karl Marx's theories of political economy in Das Kapital (1867).

== Summary ==
In the Prefaces to the essay, Lenin said the First World War (1914–1918) was "an annexationist, predatory, plunderous war" among empires, whose historical and economic background must be studied "to understand and appraise modern war and modern politics". For capitalism to generate greater profits than the home market can yield, the merging of banks and industrial cartels produces finance capitalism, and the exportation and investment of capital to countries with undeveloped and underdeveloped economies. In turn, that financial behaviour divides the world among monopolist business companies. In colonizing undeveloped countries, business and government will engage in geopolitical conflict over the exploitation of labour of most of the population of the world. Therefore, imperialism is the highest (advanced) stage of capitalism, requiring monopolies to exploit labour and natural resources, and the exportation of finance capital, rather than manufactured goods, to sustain colonialism, which is an integral function of imperialism. Moreover, in the capitalist homeland, the super-profits yielded by the colonial exploitation of a people and their economy permit businessmen to bribe native politicians, labour leaders and the labour aristocracy (upper stratum of the working class) to politically thwart worker revolt (labour strike) and placate the working class.

=== Chapter 1: Concentration of Production and Monopolies ===
Lenin argues that capitalism has progressed from a competitive stage to a monopolistic stage, where a few large corporations dominate the market. This concentration of production leads to monopolies, which in turn, leads to the rise of finance capital.

=== Chapter 2: The Banks and Their New Role ===
In this chapter, Lenin explains how the concentration of production leads to the concentration of capital, which is controlled by banks. Banks become more than mere intermediaries between savers and borrowers and begin to exert control over industry and finance.

=== Chapter 3: Finance Capital and the Financial Oligarchy ===
Lenin explains how finance capital emerges as a result of the merger of industrial and banking capital. This new form of capital leads to the emergence of a financial oligarchy, which controls the economy and government.

=== Chapter 4: The Export of Capital ===
Lenin argues that the concentration of capital leads to overproduction and surplus capital, which is then exported to less developed countries in search of higher profits. This export of capital leads to imperialism, as powerful countries seek to control and exploit weaker ones.

This means that businesses will relocate to other countries in order to find resources to exploit and workers to employ. As a result, workers in advanced capitalist countries will be kept in check by the fear of unemployment and will be content with the social welfare provided by the profits made through imperialist actions.

=== Chapter 5: The Division of the World Among Capitalist Powers ===
In this chapter, Lenin discusses how the division of the world into colonies and spheres of influence is a natural outcome of imperialism. The struggle for control over territories and resources leads to competition and conflict among capitalist powers.

=== Chapter 6: Division of the World Among the Great Powers ===
In this chapter, Lenin discusses the final partition of the world between imperialist powers from 1876 to 1900. The colonial policy of these powers aimed to monopolize control over sources of raw materials and labor in specific territories. However, there were imbalances in the division of the world, with older capitalist powers stagnating and newer ones growing rapidly. Lenin argues that the contradiction between economic development and colonial possessions can only be solved through war for redivision between these powers. In the late 19th Century countries like Britain and France took the majority of colonial possessions. Germany in particular arrived late on the scene.

=== Chapter 7: Imperialism as a Special Stage of Capitalism ===
In this chapter, Lenin criticizes Kautsky's conception of imperialism, which separates the political dimension from the fundamental economic basis. Lenin ties together the threads of his analysis, emphasizing the basic features of imperialism, including the concentration of production and capital, the merging of bank and industrial capital, the export of capital, and the formation of international monopolies. He argues that these features are products of the development of capitalism itself, rather than just policies pursued by capitalists.

Lenin attacks Kautsky's "ultra-imperialism", which claims that international cartels would lessen the unevenness and contradictions inherent in world capitalism. Lenin argues that finance capital and trusts actually increase the unevenness in the rate of growth between different parts of the world economy, which leads to wars between imperialist powers.

=== Chapter 8: Parasitism and Decay of Capitalism ===
Lenin explains that imperialism leads to increasing parasitism in advanced imperialist nations, where a section of the population lives off the dividends drawn from massive investments abroad. This results in tendencies towards stagnation and decay, as monopoly prices eliminate the incentive to invest in technological improvement. The large monopoly profits of a few rich countries are used to bribe an upper layer of the working class.

=== Chapter 9: Critique of Imperialism ===
In this chapter, Lenin discusses the attitudes of different classes towards imperialism. He notes that the propertied classes support imperialism and that even bourgeois critics only call for reforming its most violent aspects, rather than opposing it. Lenin also mentions the petit-bourgeois democratic opposition to imperialism, which contrasts freedom, democracy, and competition as alternatives to imperialism. However, Lenin argues that the workers' movement should not oppose imperialism by advocating for a return to free competition but should instead work towards socialism as the only alternative to imperialism.

=== Chapter 10: The Place of Imperialism in History ===
In this chapter, Lenin characterizes imperialism as a stage of monopoly capitalism marked by monopolies, cartels, the role of banks as monopolists of finance capital, and a new colonial policy centered around the struggle for raw materials and capital exports. He argues that imperialism has led to increases in the cost of living for working people and increased unevenness in the economic development of states. Lenin sees the monopolies' oligarchical powers as a symptom of a transitional era and a "moribund" capitalism.

Lenin thus argues that advanced capitalist nation-states and cartels exploit both their own citizens and the resources and people of other countries, creating a parasitic relationship that allows cartels to profit and expand. This ultimately relies on the use of force or threat of use of force to protect private interests. Exploited nations are unable to achieve meaningful development due to this exploitation. This affects their ability to engage with each other and defend themselves. Imperialism's all-encompassing power distorts social and economic processes in both imperialist and colonized nations. Therefore, the struggle between imperialism and decolonization is the most important conflict for the future of humanity.

== Theoretical development ==
Lenin's socio-political analysis of empire as the ultimate stage of capitalism derived from Imperialism: A Study (1902) by John A. Hobson, an English economist, and Finance Capital (Das Finanzcapital, 1910) by Rudolf Hilferding, an Austrian Marxist, whose syntheses Lenin applied to the geopolitical circumstances of the First World War, caused by imperial competition among the European empires. Three years earlier, in 1914, Karl Kautsky proposed a theory of capitalist coalition, wherein the imperial powers would unite and subsume their nationalist and economic antagonisms to a system of ultra-imperialism, whereby they would jointly effect the colonialist exploitation of the underdeveloped world. Lenin countered Kautsky by proposing that the balance of power in international relations among the European empires continually changed, thereby disallowing the political unity of ultra-imperialism, and that such political instability motivated competition and conflict, rather than co-operation:

Half a century ago, Germany was a miserable, insignificant country, if her capitalist strength is compared with that of the Britain of that time; Japan compared with Russia in the same way. Is it "conceivable that in ten or twenty years' time the relative strength will have remained unchanged?" It is out of the question.

The post–War edition of Imperialism, the Highest Stage of Capitalism (1920) identified the territorially punitive Russo–German Treaty of Brest-Litovsk (1918) and the Treaty of Versailles (1919) as proofs that empire and hegemony—not nationalism—were the economic motivations for the First World War. In the Preface to the French and German editions of the essay, Lenin proposed that revolt against the capitalist global system would be realised with the "thousand million people" of the colonies and semi-colonies (the weak points of the imperial system), rather than with the urban workers of the industrialised societies of Western Europe. That revolution would extend to the advanced (industrial) capitalist countries from the underdeveloped countries, such as Tsarist Russia, where he and the Bolsheviks had successfully assumed political command of the October Revolution of 1917. In political praxis, Lenin expected to realise the theory of Imperialism, the Highest Stage of Capitalism via the Third International (1919–1943), which he intellectually and politically dominated in the July and August conferences of 1920.

Kwame Nkrumah's work on neocolonialism took inspiration from the text and sought to update it, with the title of his book Neo-Colonialism, the Last Stage of Imperialism alluding to Lenin's work.

== Publication history ==
In 1916, Lenin wrote Imperialism, the Highest Stage of the Capitalism, in Zürich, during the January–June period; he sent it to Parus, a Petrograd-based publishing house set up by the writer Maxim Gorky, a five times nominee for the Nobel Prize in Literature and Lenin's friend; it would become a part of a series of popular surveys of West European countries involved in the war edited by the Marxist historian Mikhail Pokrovsky, but Gorky put it out in addition to the regular series. It was announced in Gorky's magazine Letopis and published by Zhizn i Znaniye (Life and Knowledge) Publishers, Petrograd, in mid 1917, with criticisms of Kautsky removed by and with a preface by Lenin, dated April 26. After the First World War, he added a new Preface (6 July 1920) for the French and German editions, which was first published in the Communist International No. 18 (1921).

Editions

- Владимир Ленин (1917), Империализм, как новейший этап капитализма, Петроград: Жизнь и Знание.
- Vladimir Lenin (1948), Imperialism, the Highest Stage of Capitalism, London: Lawrence and Wishart.
- Vladimir Lenin (2000), Imperialism, the Highest Stage of Capitalism, with Introduction by Prabhat Patnaik, New Delhi: LeftWord Books
- Vladimir Lenin (2010), Imperialism, the Highest Stage of Capitalism, Penguin Classics.

== See also ==
- Vladimir Lenin bibliography
- Congress of the Peoples of the East
- Banana republic
- Globalization
- Singer–Prebisch thesis
- Neocolonialism
- The Accumulation of Capital: A Contribution to an Economic Explanation of Imperialism (1913), by Rosa Luxemburg
- Kwame Nkrumah and his book: Neo-Colonialism, the Last Stage of Imperialism (1965)
