= Copper cartels =

Since 1870, there have been several formal attempts to restrict the copper output and raise, in this form, its price.

This is a list of copper cartels in the 20th century:

- Copper Export Association, CEA, 1918–1923
- Copper Exporters, Inc., CEI, 1926–1932
- International Copper Cartel, ICC, 1935–1939 (created by the World Copper Agreement)
- Intergovernmental Council of Copper Exporting Countries, CIPEC, 1967–1988

Prior to the rise of copper prices in late 2003 as part of the 2000s commodities boom various copper mining companies exhibited cartel-like behaviour. This consisted of announcements made in late 2001 for production cuts for 2002 which were carried out, and a repetition of similar announcements for 2003 in late 2002.
