= International Copper Cartel =

International Copper Cartel (ICC) was in effect from 1935 to 1939. The varied difficulties experienced by the copper industry after the depths of the Great Depression were followed by the idea of getting relief through some form of collective action in order to reduce the intensity of competition. In this way on March, 28th, 1935, through the World Copper Agreement, the International Copper Cartel (ICC) was formed.

== World Copper Agreement ==
The World Copper Agreement, signed March 28, 1935, was an agreement by mining companies that attempted to create a worldwide copper cartel. Uniting African, South American and European producers, the agreement aimed to "bring about better conditions in the production, distribution and marketing of copper throughout the world outside of the United States" through curtailment of production. To supervise the implementation of the agreement and amend breaches of it, the agreement provided for the creation of a Control Committee of 5 members.

== Members ==
There were five members in the cartel and two friendly foreign observers. The voting members were: Anaconda Copper (United States), Kennecott Copper (United States), Roan Antelope Copper (Northern Rhodesia), Rhokana Corporation (Northern Rhodesia) and the Union Minière du Haut-Katanga (Belgian Congo), while the non voting members were Bor (Yugoslavia) and Rio Tinto (Spain). Combined, these seven companies accounted for more than half of the global output of refined copper at that time.

== Function ==
The main difference between this and the previous copper cartels is that the ICC members did not attempt to set uniform prices. Rather, they merely wanted to influence prices indirectly, smoothing out wide price fluctuations. Despite the immense profits earned by the ICC's members in the following decades, the ICC was never reproached for charging exorbitant prices, as opposed to what happened in the case of previous cartels. Indeed, in Herfindahl’s opinion the cartel did not have any significant effect on price. These are born out in USGS annual price data showing the annual average price of copper in US Dollar per pound (2204.3 lb per metric ton), if one adjusts for the US consumer price index.

Herfindahl (1959) argued that the cartel members returned to the Nash-Cournot competition once the pivotal or trigger price was exceeded. On the other hand, Montero and Guzmán (2005) argued that the cooperative behavior could have continued in booms, but using output-expanding strategies in order to restrict the entry of the competitive fringe.

== See also ==
- Copper cartels
