= Quinine cartel =

The quinine cartel was a cartel regarding price and territory of producers of quinine and quinidine. There were two separate cartels with different members each time.

From the first isolation of quinine as an API in the year 1792 until the year 1947 it remained the only effective medicine against Malaria until Chloroquine (a comparable but synthetic API) and other drugs in adequate amounts entered the pharma market. Triggers of the cartels were the long cycles of over 10 years from planting until harvest of a tree and very volatile prices at auctions at the Amsterdam Stock Exchange. Among other things, the main objective was to prevent unprofitable plantations of cinchona being replaced by other crops such as tea or coffee. In the long term, those land areas would no longer be available for cultivating cinchona bark if the demand for quinine would suddenly rise again.

== First Cartel (between 1913 and 1942) ==
The first quinine cartel was founded in 1913. It collapsed due to the Japanese invasion of Java. It was a coalition of planters as well as producers of quinine. The headquarters of the quinine bureau was based in Amsterdam, dictating new plantations and scheduling production levels and prices.

== Second Cartel (between 1958 and 1963) ==
The second cartel only focused on territory and was only set up by quinine producers again under Dutch leadership. Prices and quotas were defined but also coordinated, that only German and Dutch producers were allowed to produce quinidine. There was no awareness of injustice. The cartel was even listed at the German Federal Cartel Office. The core of the cartel was also to form a purchasing cartel to purchase quinine sales by the US Army from the Defense National Stockpile Center, which were no longer needed. The amount of around 100 tons of quinine for sale in 1958 exceeded the total annual output of all producers and would have led to a serious drop in prices on the world market. As a comparison: in the year 2007 the NDA had a stockpile of only 4 tonnes.

Overall the fine accounted to DM 2 million imposed by the European Commission in 1969. At the time, it was the world's greatest punishment due to competition violations.

Members of the cartel:

1. Nederlandse Combinatie voor Chemische Industrie (Netherlands). percentage of the penalty payment: 42%
2. Boehringer Mannheim (Germany) percentage of the penalty payment: 38%
3. Chininfabrik Braunschweig Buchler & Co.(Germany). percentage of the penalty payment: 13%
4. Société Chimique Pointet-Girard S.A.(France). percentage of the penalty payment: 3%
5. Société Nogentaise de Produits Chimiques (France). percentage of the penalty payment: 3%
6. Pharmacie Centrale de France (France). percentage of the penalty payment: 2%
