= Michael Gehler =

Austrian historian

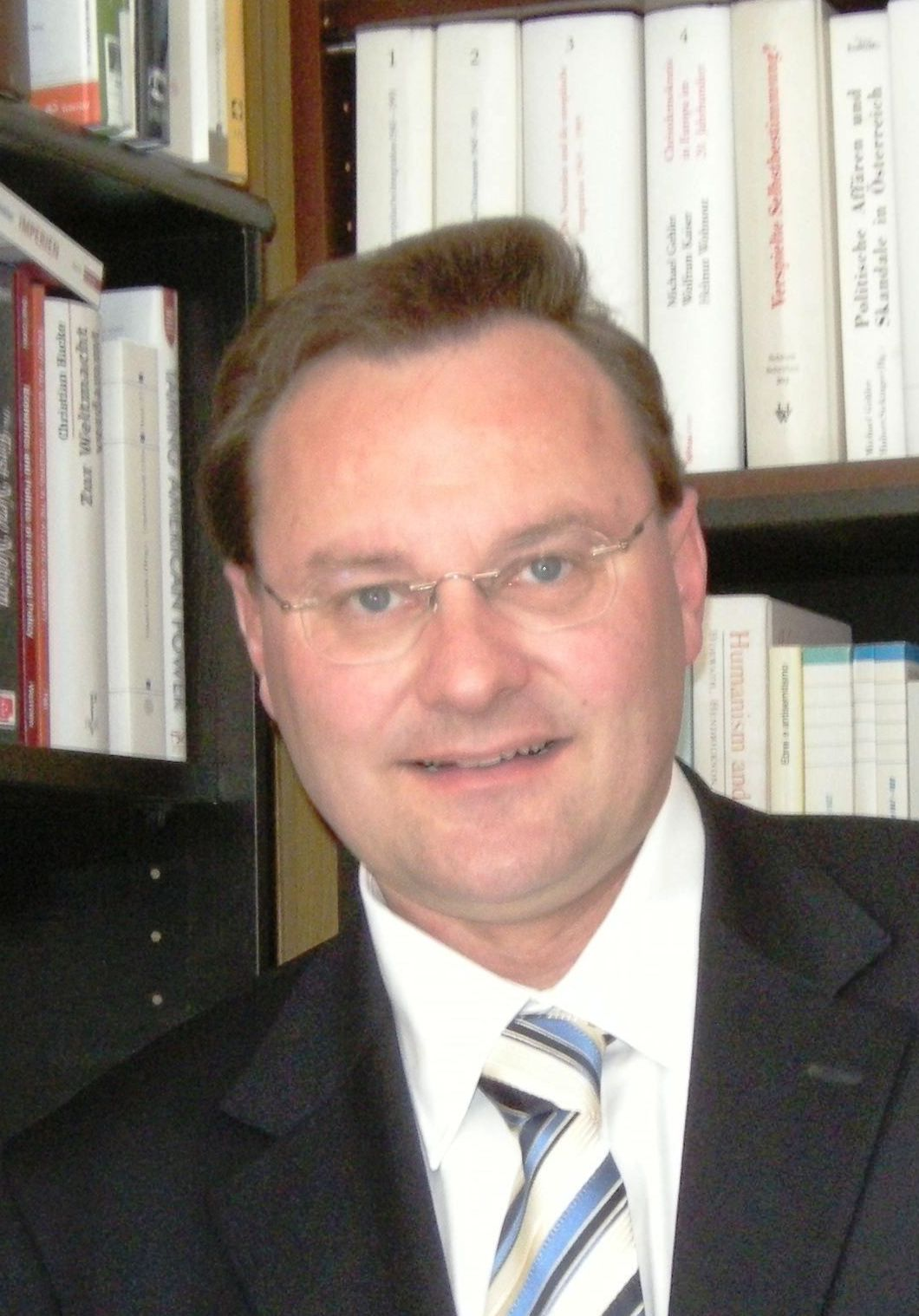
- Portrait of Gehler, 2008
- Born: 1962 (age 63–64); Innsbruck, Tyrol, Second Austrian Republic

Academic background
- Education: Leopold-Franzens-University Innsbruck

Academic work
- Discipline: History
- Sub-discipline: European studies
- Website: Michael Gehler publications on Academia.edu

Michael Gehler (born 1962 in Innsbruck) is an Austrian historian. He has been teaching at the German University of Hildesheim since 2006.

== Academic career ==
Michael Gehler graduated from high school in Neustadt bei Coburg, West Germany, and studied history and German literature at the Leopold-Franzens-University Innsbruck (LFU), Austria. From 1992 to 1996 he was a Research Fellow of the Austrian Science Fund (FWF) Vienna. In 1999 Gehler habilitated at the LFU and worked there until 2006 as an associate professor at the Institute for Contemporary History. In 2001-02 he was an Alexander von Humboldt fellow. Between 2004 and 2005 Gehler was also a visiting professor at the universities of Rostock (2004), Salzburg (2004-05) and Leuven (2005). Since 2006 he has been a professor and head of the Institute of History at the University of Hildesheim. Since 2008 Gehler has been a corresponding member of the Philosophical-Historical Class of the Austrian Academy of Sciences (ÖAW). The EU Commission awarded him a Jean Monnet Chair for European history, which was followed in 2011 and 2016 by the re-awarding of a Jean Monnet ad personam chair. In 2012, Gehler declined a call to the LFU for a professorship in contemporary history. In 2013 he accepted a call to head the Institute for Modern and Contemporary History Research (INZ) of the ÖAW in Vienna while maintaining his professorship at the University of Hildesheim. In March 2017 Gehler terminated his duties with the INZ and concentrated on Hildesheim university.

== Honors and awards ==
Gehler has received numerous awards and honors from Austrian and German institutions:

- 1988 the Ludwig Jedlicka Memorial Prize,
- 1994 the Dr. Wilfried Haslauer Research Award in Salzburg,
- 1994 the Theodor Körner Foundation Prize for the Promotion of Science and Art,
- 1996 the Cardinal Innitzer Promotion Prize for Social and Economic Sciences.
- 2001 the award of the state capital (=Innsbruck) for scientific research at the University of Innsbruck,
- 2004 the Karl von Vogelsang State Prize for History of Social Sciences Vienna,
- 2010 the Minerva Medal of the University of Hildesheim Foundation,
- 2011 the Austrian Cross of Honor for Science and Art,
- 2012 the silver cross-bracteat of the city of Hildesheim for the commitment to initiate and conduct lectures on European policy education,
- 2014 the price of the University Society Hildesheim e.V. for teachers as "award for special commitment and outstanding achievements in the design of an open educational landscape between university and public".

== Scientific profile ==
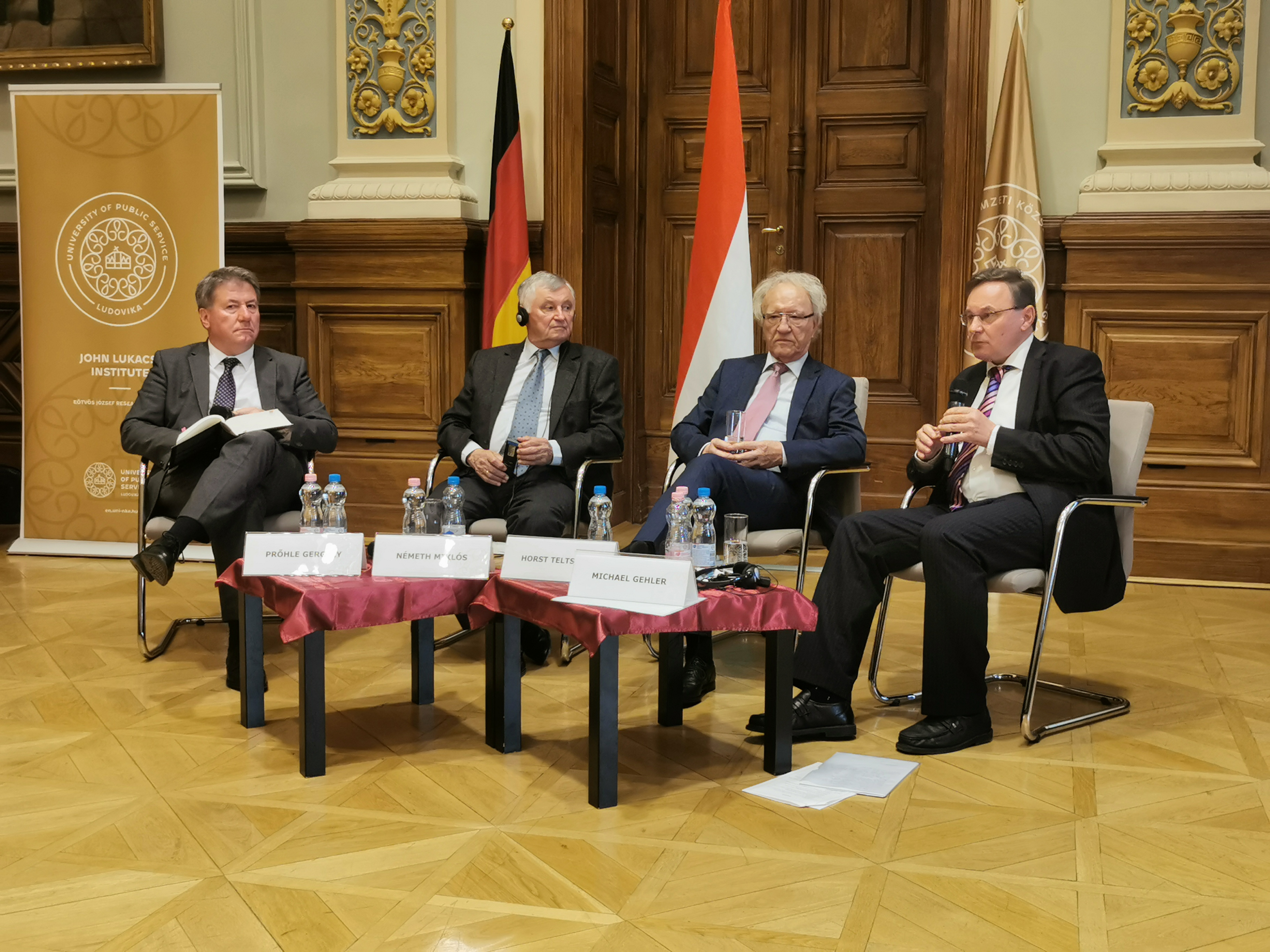
At John Lukacs Institute Budapest

Gehler works on Austrian, German and European contemporary history. The main areas of research are national and regional history, with special attention to the South Tyrol issue, and international relations, with special attention to European integration. Gehler has a wide-ranging scientific network that goes far beyond that of colleagues in professors and includes both young researchers and living personalities of contemporary history (civil servants, diplomats, politicians). Gehler is considered a committed mediator of scientific content in public and teaching. Gehler's works have increasingly been published in English.

== Works ==
=== Monographs ===
- Three Germanies. West Germany, East Germany and the Berlin Republic (2011 and 2020).
- From Saint-Germain to Lisbon: Austria's long road from disintegrated to united Europe 1919–2009. Vienna 2020.

=== Edited ===
- EU–China. Global Players in a Complex World. Co-ed. by Xuewu Gu and Andreas Schimmelpfennig. Hildesheim 2012.
- The Revolutions of 1989. Co-ed. by Wolfgang Mueller and Arnold Suppan. Vienna 2015.
- Populism, populists, and the crisis of political parties: A comparison of Italy, Austria, and Germany 1990–2015. Co-ed. by Günther Pallaver and Maurizio Cau. Bologna: Società Editrice il Mulino, 2018.
- Short-term Empires in World History (International Conference). Co-ed. by Robert Rollinger and Julian Degen. Wiesbaden, 2020 (https://doi.org/10.1007/978-3-658-29435-9).
