= Kartel, Maharashtra =

Village in Maharashtra

Kartel
- Village
- Interactive map of Kartel
- Country: India
- State: Maharashtra

Kartel, Maharashtra is a small village in Konkan Ratnagiri district, Maharashtra state in Western India. The 2011 Census of India recorded a total of 412 residents in the village. Kartel, Maharashtra's geographical area is approximately 488 hectares (1,210 acres).
