= International Copper Study Group =

Intergovernmental organization

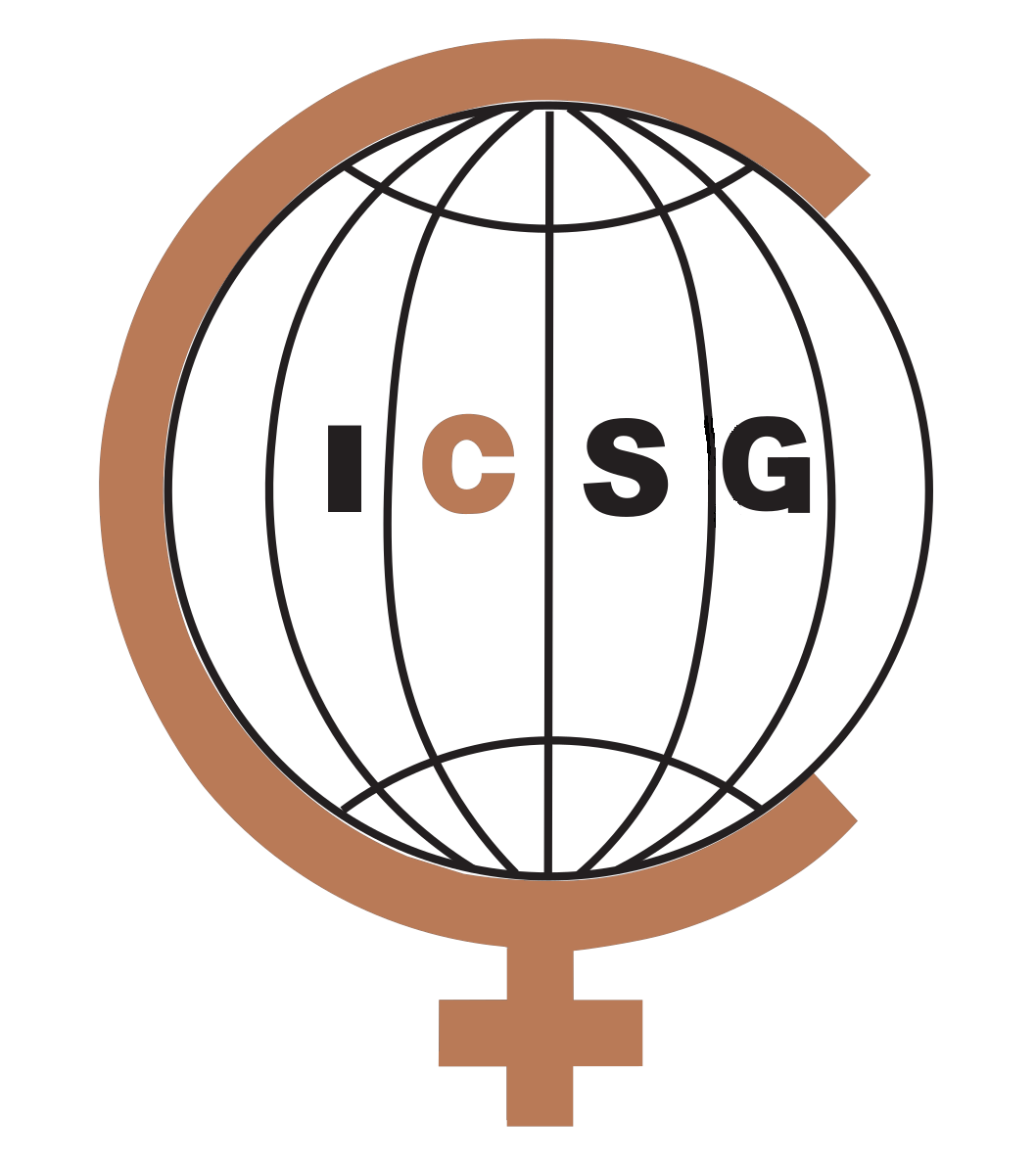
- Abbreviation: ICSG
- Formation: January 1992
- Type: Intergovernmental Organization
- Legal status: Active
- Purpose: Promote transparency in the global copper market
- Headquarters: Lisbon
- Location: Portugal
- Secretary-General: Paul White
- Website: www.icsg.org

The International Copper Study Group (ICSG) is an intergovernmental organisation of copper producing and consuming States that functions as the international commodity board for copper. Its main purpose is to increase copper market transparency and promote international discussions and cooperation on issues related to copper. ICSG member States represent approximately 85 percent of world copper mine production, refined production and usage.

The creation of the ICSG was negotiated in 1989 in Geneva and was agreed to in a multilateral treaty known as the 'Agreement Establishing the Terms of Reference of the International Copper Study Group'. The ICSG came into existence on 23 January 1992, with the secretariat headquarters located in Lisbon, Portugal, which also hosts the International Nickel Study Group and the International Lead and Zinc Study Group.

The Study Group has three main objectives:

- To promote market transparency by encouraging the exchange of information on production, usage, stocks, trade, and prices of copper, by forecasting production and usage, and by assessing the present and future capacities of copper mines, plants, smelters and refineries.
- To enhance international cooperation on matters related to copper, such as health and the environment, research, technology transfer, regulations and trade.
- The provision of a global forum where industry and governments can meet and discuss common problems/objectives. The ICSG is the only inter-governmental forum solely dedicated to copper.

The ICSG maintains a statistical databases on copper and publishes monthly Bulletins containing detailed statistical data on copper mine, smelter and refinery production, copper usage, stocks, prices and trade. The Group also publishes comprehensive information on operating and planned mines, smelters and refineries around the world as well as an annual Directory regarding the current status of copper semi-fabricator plants.

Meetings of the Group's member States' delegates and industry representatives are held on a twice yearly basis, usually in April and October.

The ICSG World Copper Factbook provides a concise and up-to-date overview of the global copper market. This is available free of charge on the ICSG website.

Topics covered in other ICSG reports and studies include:

- The Mineral Composition and Regulation of Copper Concentrates, Smelters and Refineries
- The Chinese Copper Smelter and Refining Industry
- North American Semi-Manufactured Copper Products Capacity: Output and Perspectives
- European Semi Manufactured Copper Products Capacity
- Solid Wastes in Base Metal Mining, Smelting and Refining: A Comprehensive Study for the Copper, Lead and Zinc and Nickel Industries
- Smelting and Hydrometallurgy Treatment for Copper Sulphide Ores and Concentrates
- Manufacture and Use of Semi-Fabricated copper in Latin America/Canada
- Industrial Use of Refined Copper and Scrap in Fabrication in China
- Fabrication and Copper Use in Indian Subcontinent, ASEAN and Oceania
- Study of By-Products of Lead, Zinc, Copper and Nickel
- Social Acceptance for Mineral and Metal Projects
- Taxation, Royalties and Other Fiscal Measures Applied to the Non-Ferrous Metals Industry
- Risk Factors in Developing Minerals and Metal Projects

== Membership ==
Membership of the ICSG is open to any State that is involved in the production, trade, or consumption of copper. As of 2024, the Group comprised 26 members, including the European Union:

- Australia
- Belgium
- Brazil
- Chile
- China
- Democratic Republic of Congo
- European Union
- Finland
- France
- Germany
- India
- Iran
- Italy
- Japan
- Kazakhstan
- Luxembourg
- Mexico
- Mongolia
- Peru
- Poland
- Portugal
- Russia
- Serbia
- Spain
- Sweden
- United States

There are seven States that were previously full members of the ICSG:

- Canada
- Indonesia
- Greece
- Netherlands
- Norway
- Philippines
- United Kingdom
