= Friedrich Kleinwächter =

Austrian economist

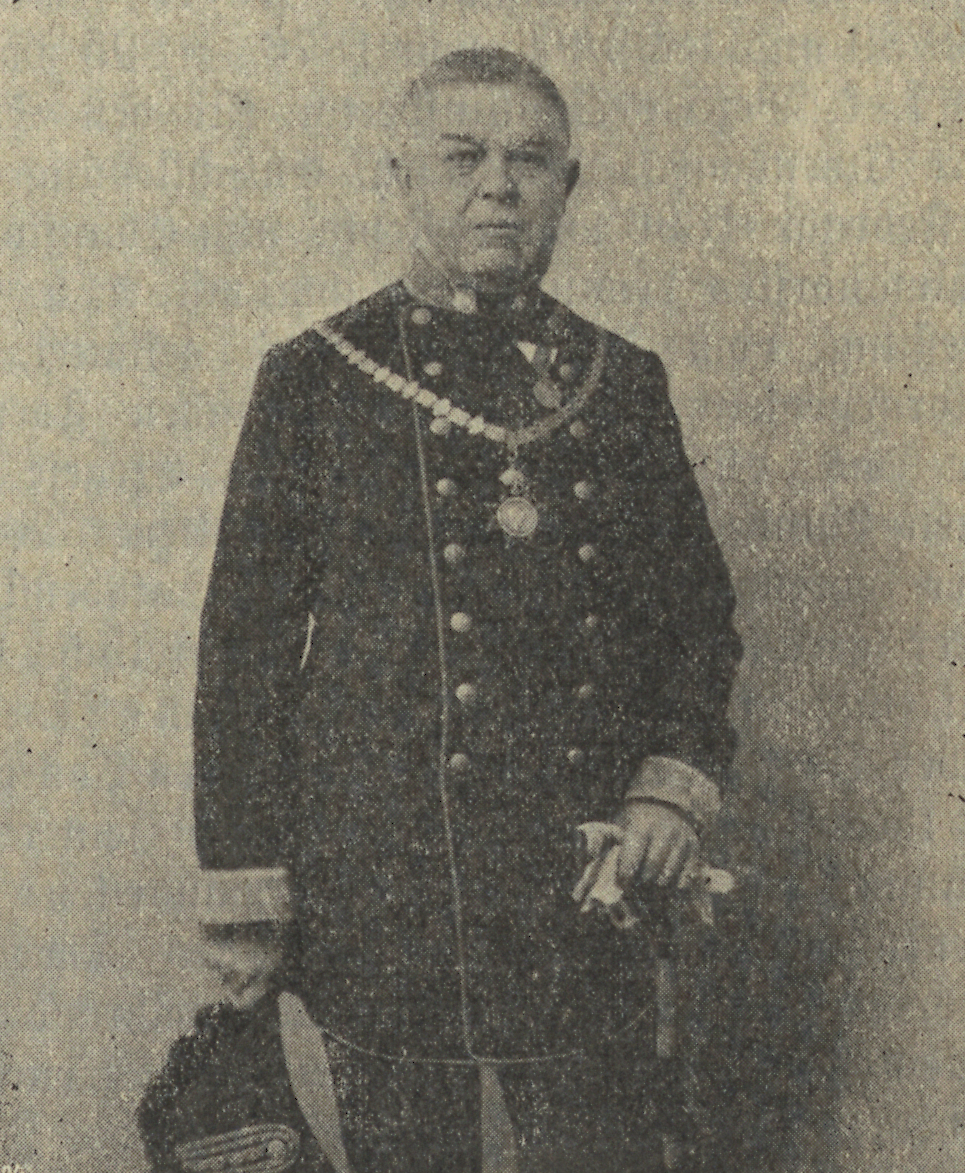
Friedrich Kleinwächter

Friedrich (von) Kleinwächter (25 February 1838 – 12 December 1927) was an Austrian economist.

== Social life ==
Friedrich Kleinwächter was born in the multiethnic Prague of the times of the imperial Austria-Hungary. His family was German, living next to Czechs, Jews and others. Kleinwächter worked and died in Czernowitz (now Chernivtsi, Ukraine), which was even more multiethnic (Jews, Germans, Romanians, Ukrainians and Polish) and became Romanian since 1919. In 1909, Kleinwächter had been ennobled and was authorized to use the prefix "von" before "Kleinwächter".

== Professional life ==
In 1865, Friedrich Kleinwächter habilitated in Prague, whereupon he became an ordinary professor at the Technical University Riga in Riga/Russia and since 1875 until his emeritation he was ordinary professor of political economics (Ordinarius für Staatswissenschaften) at the newly established "Franz-Josephs-Universität" at Czernowitz. There he lectured finance in combination with financial law and public administration. Later he switched to economics in general. 1882/83 and 1893/94 Kleinwächter was Rektor of the University of Czernowitz.

Kleinwächter published several text books, and furthermore many articles in the periodical Jahrbücher für Nationalökonomie und Statistik. 1882–1902 he was editor of the German-speaking Genossenschaftszeitung (journal of cooperatives) for the Bukovina district in the very Northeast of Austria-Hungary.

His son was the diplomat Ludwig Kleinwächter. His nephew was the lawyer Friedrich F. G. Kleinwächter.

== Scientific achievements ==
In 1883 Kleinwächter presented the first scientific analysis on economic cartels. His judgement of them was positive similar of that on the guilds of the premodern times. According to him, the cartels could regulate the anarchism in the economic life ("Anarchismus in der Volkswirtschaft"), which came from the vigorous competition of the liberal economic system of Kleinwächter's life time. He defined types of cartels, namely production, sales and price cartels. To them, he also put some kinds of agreements between employers.

In the dispute with the social movements of industrialization, Kleinwächter conceded that the scientific socialism had contributed much to the discussion of the social issue. But that was almost its main achievement, because the further economic theses of the socialists were more or less wrong.

In the English speaking world, Kleinwächter is to some extent known because of the so-called Kleinwachter's conundrum on income tax. The conundrum was popularized by Henry Simons, who mentioned it in his tax treatise, Personal Income Taxation. In illustrating this point, Simons referred to this one of several hypotheticals posed by Kleinwächter.

== Writings ==
- Zur Reform der Handwerks-Verfassung. Berlin 1875
- Die National-Oekonomie als Wissenschaft und ihre Stellung zu den übrigen Disziplinen; Rede gehalten am 4. Oktober 1882 bei Uebernahme des Rektorates der Franz-Josefs-Universität Czernowitz. Habel, Berlin 1882 (Digitized)
- Die industriellen Cartelle. Innsbruck 1883
- Die Grundlagen und Ziele des sogenannten wissenschaftlichen Sozialismus, Innsbruck 1885.
- Die Staatsromane. Ein Beitrag zur Lehre von Communismus und Socialismus. Vienna 1891. Reprint Liberac 1967
- Das Einkommen und seine Verteilung. Leipzig 1896
- Zur Frage der Reform des österreichischen Actienrechtes. Czernowitz 1899
- Kartelle, in: Handwörterbuch der Staatswissenschaften, Vol. 5, Jena 1900, 2. ed. or Jena 1910, 3. ed.
- Lehrbuch der Nationalökonomie. Leipzig 1902, several editions
- Lehrbuch der Volkswirtschaftspolitik. Hirschfeld 1911
- Lehrbuch der Finanzwissenschaft. Hirschfeld 1922
- Der Entwicklungsgang der nationalökonomischen Wissenschaft in Deutschland, Leipzig 1926

== Secondary literature ==
- "Kleinwächter Friedrich von". In: Österreichisches Biographisches Lexikon 1815–1950 (ÖBL). Vol. 3, Austrian Academy of Sciences, Vienna 1965, p. 392 f. (Direct links to "p. 392", "p. 393")
