= Robert Liefmann =

German economist

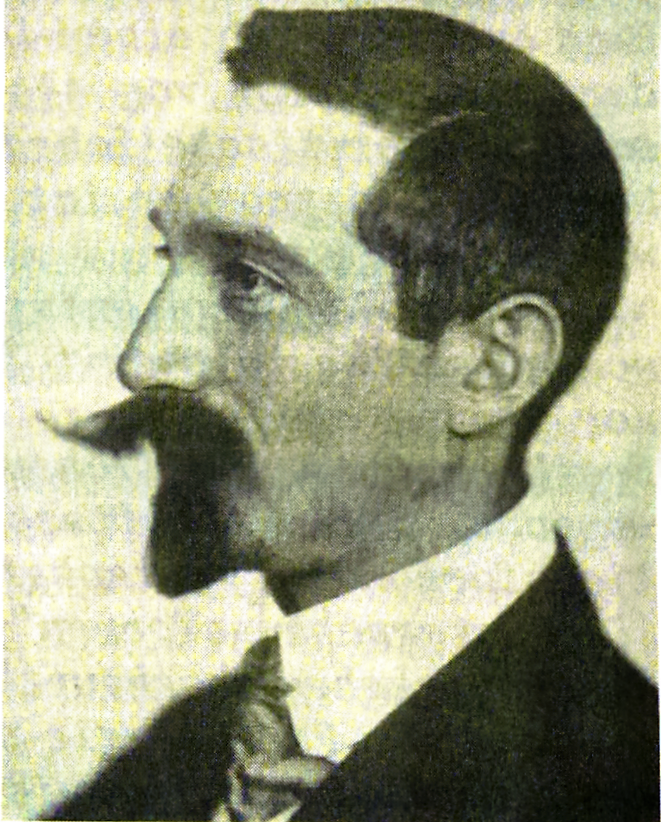
Robert Liefmann in 1910

Robert Liefmann (1874–1941) was a German economist.

Liefmann was born on 4 February 1874 in Hamburg to Semmy and Auguste Juliane Liefmann, and had five siblings - three brothers, Karl, Alfred and Harry, all of whom died young, and two sisters, Else Liefmann and Martha Liefmann. His family moved to Freiburg in 1885, and after the death of his parents, Liefmann lived with his two surviving sisters in the family home, the Liefmann-Haus at 33 Goethestraße.

Liefmann studied economics and law at the University of Freiburg, notably under Max Weber. He was appointed associate professor at the university in 1904, and full professor from 1914. He is known for his scholarship on trusts and cartels, and the interplay of psychology and economics.

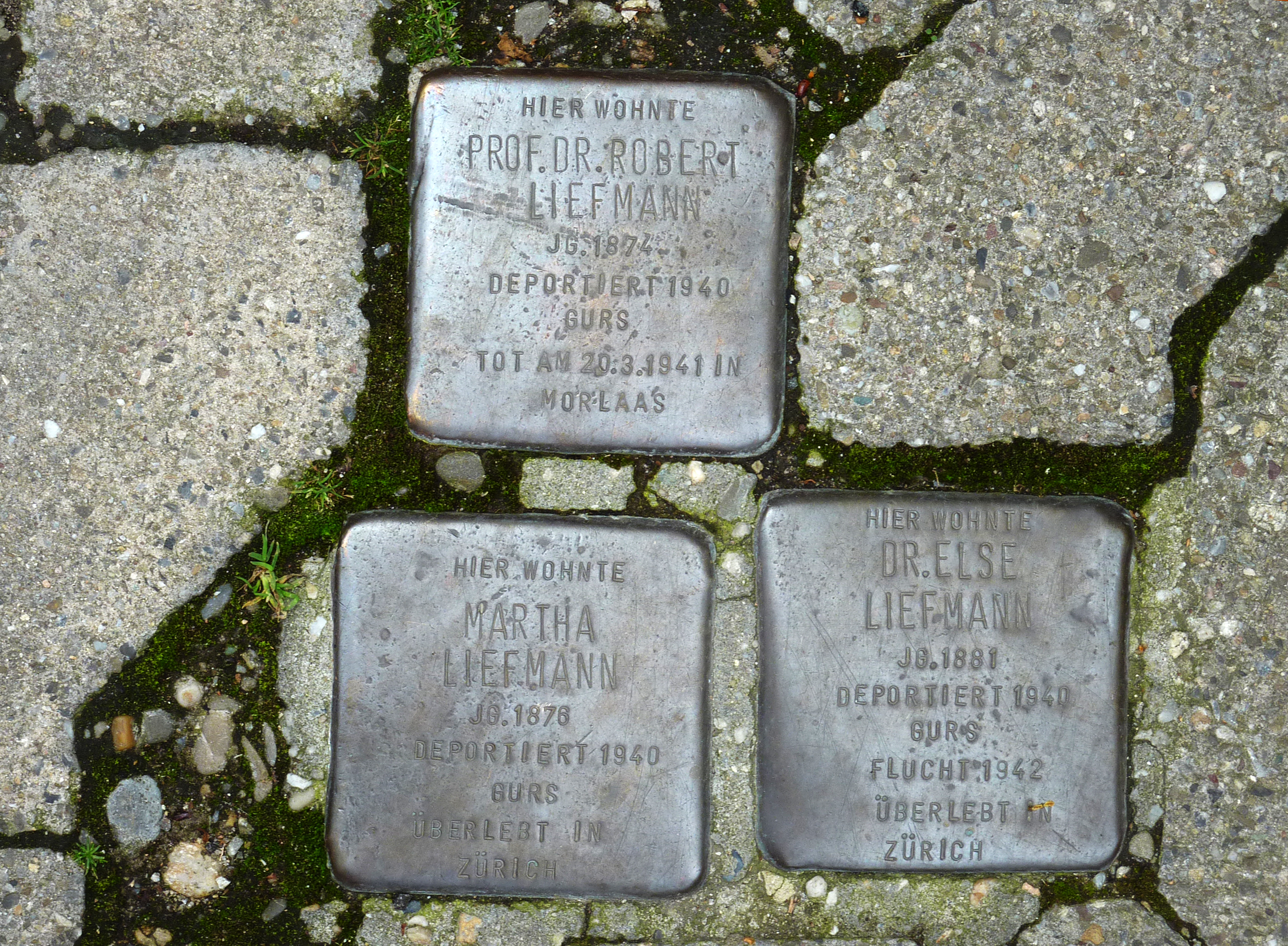
Stolpersteine for the Liefmann siblings

In 1933, Liefmann was forced by the Third Reich to stop teaching. The Liefmann-Haus was subsequently seized by the Gestapo, and Liefmann and his sisters were arrested on 22 October 1940 and imprisoned in the Gurs internment camp. Through the intervention of Adolf Freudenberg, the three siblings were permitted a holiday in Morlaàs in February 1941, where Liefmann, who was in poor health, died on 20 March 1941.

== Selected works ==
- Kartell, 1905
- Beteiligungs- und Finanzierungsgeselschaften, 1909
- "Geld und Gold", 1916
- Grundsätze der Volkswirtschaftslehre, 2 Vols., 1917-1919
- "Die Geldvermehrung im Weltkriege und die Beseitigung ihrer Folgen : eine Untersuchung zu den Problemen der Übergangswirtschaft",1918
