= Cartel =

Mutually beneficial collusion among competing corporations

A cartel is a group of independent market participants who collaborate with each other and avoid competing with each other in order to improve their profits and dominate the market. They seek to limit competition, fix prices, and increase prices by creating artificial shortages through low production quotas, stockpiling, and marketing quotas. Cartel behaviors can be either legal or illegal, but jurisdictions frequently consider cartelization to be anti-competitive behavior, leading them to outlaw or curtail cartel practices. Anti-trust law targets cartel behavior in markets.

The doctrine in economics that analyzes cartels is cartel theory. Cartels are distinguished from other forms of collusion or anti-competitive organization such as corporate mergers. Cartels are inherently unstable due to the temptation by members of the cartel to cheat and defect on each other by improving their individual profits, which may lead to falling prices for all members. Advancements in technology or the emergence of substitutes can undermine cartel pricing power, leading to the breakdown of the cooperation needed to sustain the cartel. Outside actors often respond to the undersupply of a good by bolstering their production of the good, investing in technologies that use the good more efficiently, or investing in substitutes.

Cartels can be organized on an international basis; examples of international cartels include the OPEC cartel to collude on oil production and the International Rubber Regulation Agreement to collude on rubber production. They can also exist at a national level; examples of American cartels include the United States Gunpowder Trade Association (which was dissolved by U.S. courts in 1912) and the National Collegiate Athletic Association which restricts the kind of compensation that collegiate athletes can receive.

== Etymology ==
The word cartel comes from the Italian word cartello ('leaf of paper' or 'placard'), itself derived from the Latin charta 'card'. In Middle French, the Italian word became cartel, which was borrowed into English. In English, the word was originally used for a written agreement between warring nations to regulate the treatment and exchange of prisoners from the 1690s onward. From 1899 onwards, the usage of the word became generalized as to mean any intergovernmental agreement between rival nations.

The use of the English word cartel to describe an economic group rather than international agreements was derived much later in the 1800s from the German Kartell, which also has its origins in the French cartel. It was first used between German railway companies in 1846 to describe tariff and technical standardization efforts. The first time the word was referred to describe a kind of restriction of competition was by the Austro-Hungarian political scientist Lorenz von Stein, who wrote on tariff cartels:

There's no more one-sided perspective than the one saying that such rate-cartels are "monopoly cartels" or cartels for the "exploitation of carriers".

— Lorenz von Stein, 1874

== History ==
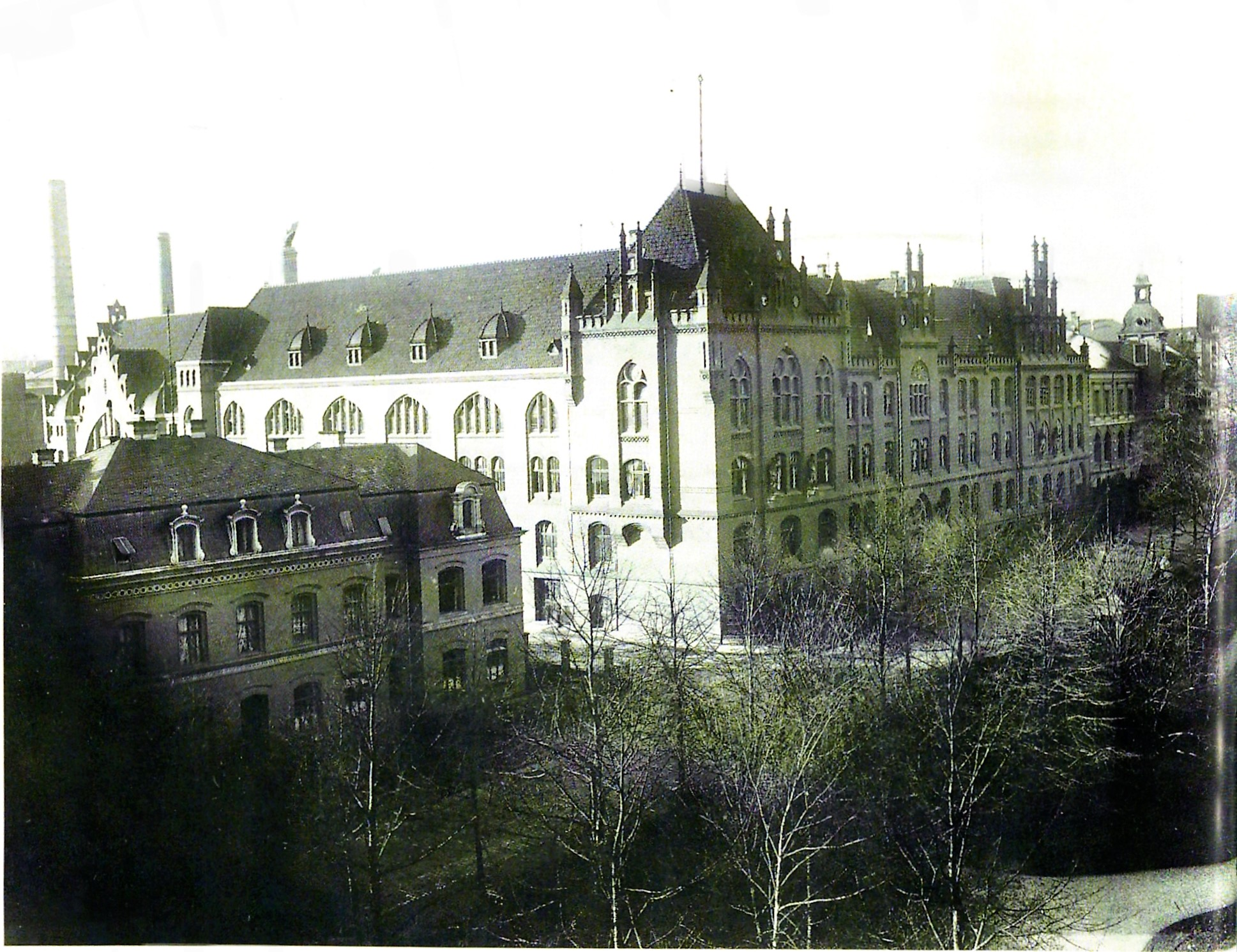
Headquarters of the Rhenish-Westphalian Coal Syndicate, Germany (at times the best known cartel in the world), around 1910

Cartels have existed since ancient times. Guilds in the European Middle Ages, associations of craftsmen or merchants of the same trade, have been regarded as cartel-like. Tightly organized sales cartels existed in the mining industry of the late Middle Ages, like the 1301 salt syndicate in France and Naples, or the Alaun cartel of 1470 between the Papal State and Naples. Both unions had common sales organizations for overall production called the Societas Communis Vendicionis ('Common Sales Society').

Laissez-faire (liberal) economic conditions dominated Europe and North America in the 18th and 19th centuries. Around 1870, cartels first appeared in industries formerly under free-market conditions. Although cartels existed in all economically developed countries, the core area of cartel activities was in central Europe. The German Empire and Austria-Hungary were nicknamed the "lands of the cartels". Cartels were also widespread in the United States during the period of robber barons and industrial trusts.

The creation of cartels increased globally after World War I. They became the leading form of market organization, particularly in Europe and Japan. In the 1930s, authoritarian regimes such as Nazi Germany, Italy under Mussolini, and Spain under Franco used cartels to organize their corporatist economies. Between the late 19th century and around 1945, the United States was ambivalent about cartels and trusts. There were periods of both opposition to market concentration and relative tolerance of cartels. During World War II, the United States strictly turned away from cartels. After 1945, American-promoted market liberalism led to a worldwide cartel ban, where cartels continue to be obstructed in an increasing number of countries and circumstances.

== Types ==
Cartels have many structures and functions that ideally enable corporations to navigate and control market uncertainties and gain collusive profits within their industry. A typical cartel often requires what competition authorities refer to as a CAU (Contact, Agreement or Understanding). Typologies have emerged to distinguish distinct forms of cartels:

- Selling or buying cartels unite against the cartel's customers or suppliers, respectively. The former type is more frequent than the latter.
- Domestic cartels only have members from one country, whereas international cartels have members from more than one country. There have been full-fledged international cartels that have comprised the whole world, such as the international steel cartel of the period between World War I and II.
- Price cartels engage in price fixing, normally to raise prices for a commodity above the competitive price level. The loosest form of a price cartel can be recognized in tacit collusion (implicit collusion), wherein smaller enterprises individually devise their prices and market shares in response to the same market conditions, without direct communication, resulting in a less competitive outcome. This type of collusion is generally legal and can achieve a monopolistic outcome.
- Quota cartels distribute proportional shares of the market to their members.
- Common sales cartels sell their joint output through a central selling agency (in French: comptoir). They are also known as syndicates (French: syndicat industriel).
- Territorial cartels distribute districts of the market to be used only by individual participants, which act as monopolists.
- Submission cartels control offers given to public tenders. They use bid rigging: bidders for a tender agree on a bid price. They then do not bid in unison, or share the return from the winning bid among themselves.
- Technology and patent cartels share knowledge about technology or science within themselves while they limit the information from outside individuals.
- Condition cartels unify contractual terms – the modes of payment and delivery, or warranty limits.
- Standardization cartels implement common standards for sold or purchased products. If the members of a cartel produce different sorts or grades of a good, conversion factors are applied to calculate the value of the respective output.
- Compulsory cartels, also called "forced cartels", are established or maintained by external pressure. Voluntary cartels are formed by the free will of their participants.
- Occupational licensing

== Effects ==
A survey of hundreds of published economic studies and legal decisions of antitrust authorities found that the median price increase achieved by cartels in the last 200 years is about 23 percent. Private international cartels (those with participants from two or more nations) had an average price increase of 28 percent, whereas domestic cartels averaged 18 percent. Less than 10 percent of all cartels in the sample failed to raise market prices.

In general, cartel agreements are economically unstable in that there is an incentive for members to cheat by selling at below the cartel's agreed price or selling more than the cartel's production quotas. Many cartels that attempt to set product prices are unsuccessful in the long term because of cheating punishment mechanisms such as price wars or financial punishment. An empirical study of 20th-century cartels determined that the mean duration of discovered cartels is from 5 to 8 years and overcharged by approximately 32%. This distribution was found to be bimodal, with many cartels breaking up quickly (less than a year), many others lasting between five and ten years, and still some that lasted decades. Within the industries that have operating cartels, the median number of cartel members is 8. Once a cartel is broken, the incentives to form a new cartel return, and the cartel may be re-formed. Publicly known cartels that do not follow this business cycle include, by some accounts, OPEC.

Cartels adversely affect international trade.

Cartels often practice price fixing internationally. When the agreement to control prices is sanctioned by a multilateral treaty or protected by national sovereignty, no antitrust actions may be initiated. OPEC countries partially control the price of oil.

== Organization ==
Drawing upon research on organizational misconduct, scholars in economics, sociology and management have studied the organization of cartels. They have paid attention to the way cartel participants work together to conceal their activities from antitrust authorities. Even more than reaching efficiency, participating firms need to ensure that their collective secret is maintained. “However, the orchestrator, often the vendor with all information, typically remains unnoticed by antitrust authorities, raising questions about the culpability of unaware distributors.”

== Cartel theory versus antitrust concept ==
The scientific analysis of cartels is based on cartel theory. It was pioneered in 1883 by the Austrian economist Friedrich Kleinwächter and in its early stages was developed mainly by German-speaking scholars. These scholars tended to regard cartels as an acceptable part of the economy. At the same time, American lawyers increasingly turned against trade restrictions, including all cartels. The Sherman act, which impeded the formation and activities of cartels, was passed in the United States in 1890. The American viewpoint, supported by activists like Thurman Arnold and Harley M. Kilgore, eventually prevailed when governmental policy in Washington could have a larger impact in World War II.

== Legislation and penalties ==
Because cartels are likely to have an impact on market positions, they are subjected to competition law, which is executed by governmental competition regulators. Very similar regulations apply to corporate mergers. A single entity that holds a monopoly is not considered a cartel but can be sanctioned through other abuses of its monopoly.

Prior to World War II, members of cartels could sign contracts that were enforceable in courts of law except in the United States. Before 1945, cartels were tolerated in Europe and specifically promoted as a business practice in German-speaking countries. In U.S. v. National Lead Co. et al., the Supreme Court of the United States noted the testimony of individuals who cited that a cartel, in its versatile form, is

a combination of producers for the purpose of regulating production and, frequently, prices, and an association by agreement of companies or sections of companies having common interests so as to prevent extreme or unfair competition.

The first legislation against cartels to be enforced was the Sherman Act 1890, which also prohibits price fixing, market-sharing, output restrictions and other anti-competitive conduct. Section 1 and 2 of the Act outlines the law in regards to cartels,

Section 1:

Every contract, combination in the form of trust or otherwise, or conspiracy, in restraint of trade or commerce among the several States, or with foreign nations, is declared to be illegal.

Section 2:

Every person who shall monopolize, or attempt to monopolize, or combine or conspire with any other person or persons, to monopolize any part of the trade or commerce among the several States, or with foreign nations, shall be deemed guilty of a felony, and, on conviction thereof, shall be punished by fine not exceeding $100 million if a corporation, or, if any other person, $1 million, or by imprisonment not exceeding ten years, or by both said punishments, in the discretion of the court.

In practice, detecting and desisting cartels is undertaken through the use of economic analysis and leniency programmes. Economic analysis is implemented to identify any discrepancies in market behaviour between both suspected and unsuspected cartel engaged firms. A structural approach is done in the form of screening already suspicious firms for industry traits of a typical cartel price path. A typical path often includes a formation phase in which prices decline, followed by a transition phase in which prices tend to rise, and end with a stationary phase in which price variance remains low. Indicators such as price changes alongside import rates, market concentration, time period of permanent price changes and stability of companies' market shares are used as economic markers to help supplement the search for cartel behaviour. On the contrary, when aiming to create suspicion around potential cartels, a behavioural approach is often used to identify behavioural collusive patterns, to initiate further economic analysis into identifying and prosecuting those involved in the operations. For example, studies have shown that industries are more likely to experience collusion where there are fewer firms, products are homogeneous and there is a stable demand.

=== Leniency programmes ===
Leniency programmes were first introduced in 1978 in the US, before being successfully reformed in 1993. The underlying principle of a leniency program is to offer discretionary penalty reductions for corporations or individuals who are affiliated with cartel operations, in exchange for their cooperation with enforcement authorities in helping to identify and penalise other participating members. According to the Australian Department of Justice, the following 6 conditions must be met for admission into a leniency program:

1. The corporation is the first one to come forward and qualify for leniency with respect to the illegal activity being reported;
2. The Division, at the time the corporation comes in, does not yet have evidence against the company that is likely to result in a sustainable conviction;
3. The corporation, upon its discovery of the illegal activity being reported, took prompt and effective action to terminate its part in the activity;
4. The corporation reports the wrongdoing with candor and completeness and provides full, continuing and complete cooperation that advances the Division in its investigation;
5. The confession of wrongdoing is truly a corporate act, as opposed to isolated confessions of individual executives or officials;
6. Where possible, the corporation makes restitution to injured parties; and
7. The Division determines that granting leniency would not be unfair to others, considering the nature of the illegal activity, the confessing corporation's role in it, and when the corporation comes forward.

The application of leniency programme penalties varies according to individual countries policies and are proportional to cartel profits and years of infringement. However, typically the first corporation or individual to cooperate will receive the most reduced penalty in comparison to those who come forward later. The effectiveness of leniency programmes in destabilising and deterring cartels is evidenced by the decreased formation and discovery of cartels in the US since the introduction of the programmes in 1993. Some prosecuted examples include:

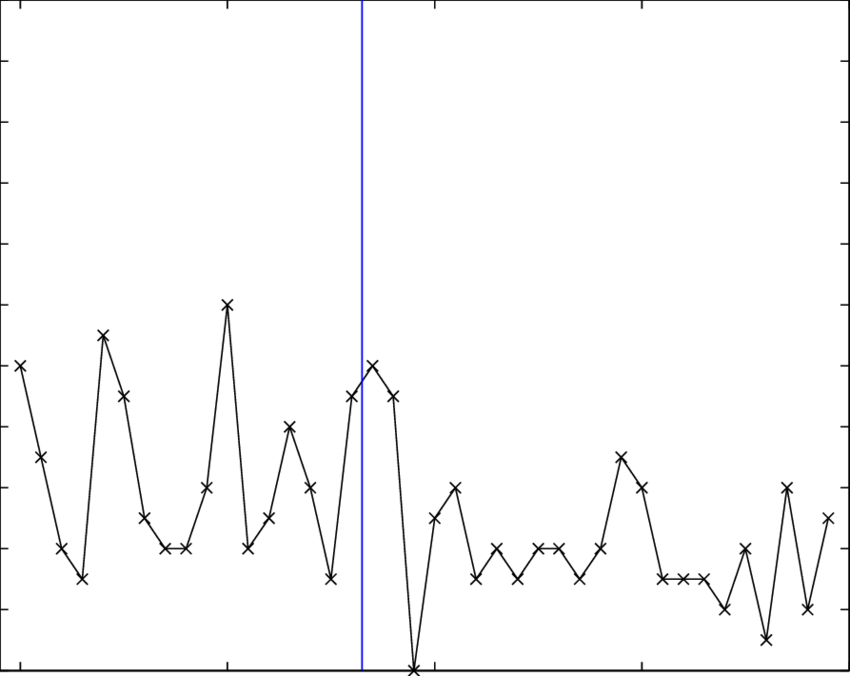
- Graph showing the decline in formation and discoveries of cartels in the US following the introduction of leniency programmes in 1993. Following the introduction, cartel formations and discoveries decreased to all time lows.
  Lysine Cartel: An employee of Archer Daniels Midland (ADM) alerted authorities of the existence of the cartel within the Lysine industry.
- Stainless steel: Buyers of the product complained to the European Commission (EC) about price spikes.
- Sodium gluconate: Defendants in the lysine case informed authorities of collusive behaviours between corporations in this industry.

=== Price fixing ===
Today, price fixing by private entities is illegal under the antitrust laws of more than 140 countries. The commodities of prosecuted international cartels include lysine, citric acid, graphite electrodes, and bulk vitamins. In many countries, the predominant belief is that cartels are contrary to free and fair competition, considered the backbone of political democracy. Maintaining cartels continues to become harder for cartels. Even if international cartels cannot be regulated as a whole by individual nations, their individual activities in domestic markets are affected.

Unlike other cartels, export cartels are legal in virtually all jurisdictions, despite their harmful effects on affected markets.

== Examples ==
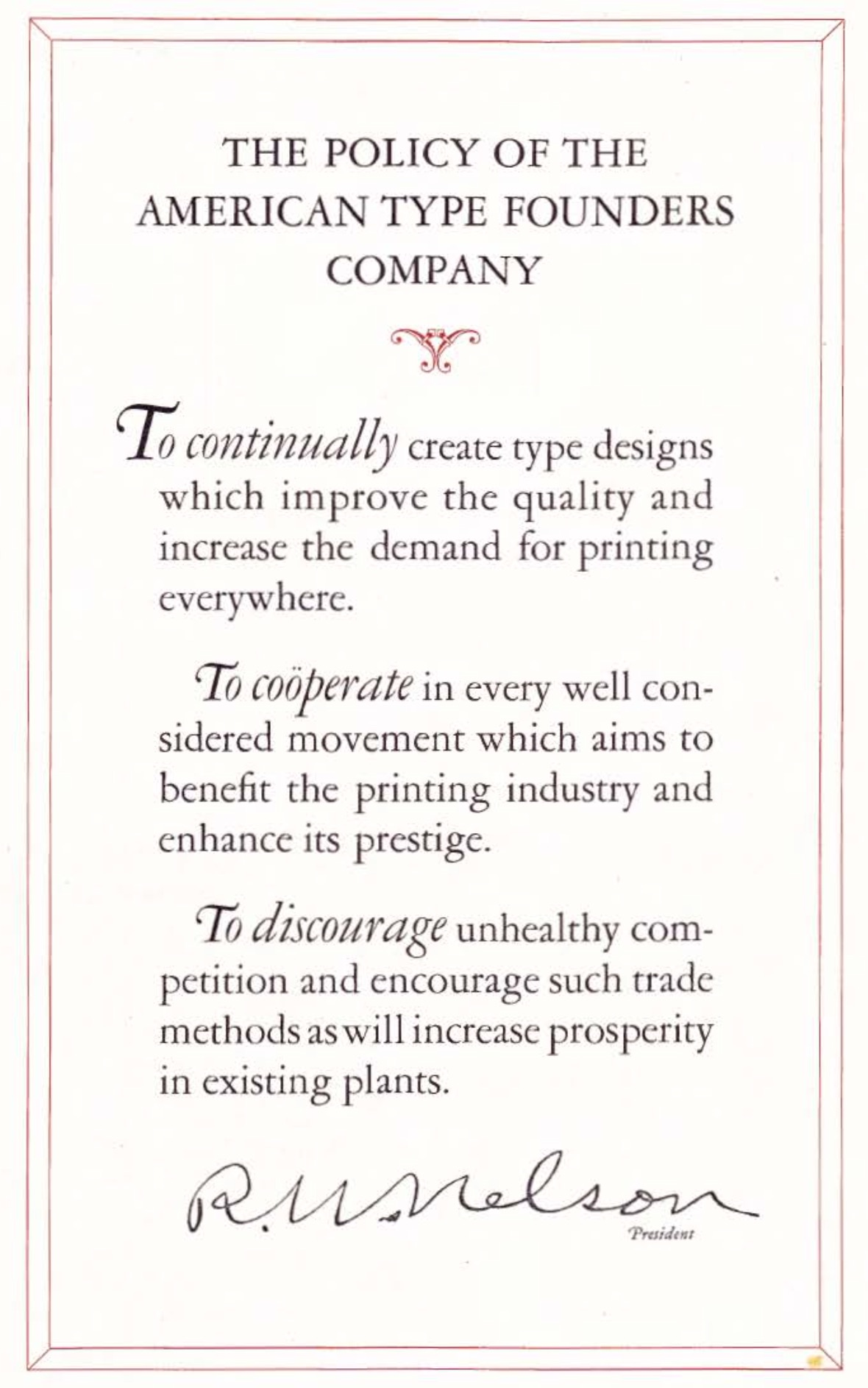
The printing equipment company American Type Founders (ATF) explicitly states in its 1923 manual that its goal is to "discourage unhealthy competition" in the printing industry.

- The Limitation of the Vend (sometimes dated 1771–1845, but can be traced back much earlier), was a price fixing combination of English coal miner owners; it may have been the longest-lasting cartel.
- The Phoebus cartel was established by lighting manufacturers in the early 20th century to control the pricing and lifespan of incandescent light bulbs.
- The bromine cartel (1885–1914).
- The railroad cartel in the United States.
- The U.S. "beef trust", American meatpacking companies who fixed prices, in the late 19th and early 20th century.
- The Quinine cartel existed among producers of the anti-malarial drug Quinine to control production rates and pricing, operating in the early 20th century with two incarnations. During the early years of its operation, Quinine was the only viable medical treatment for malaria.
- The British Radio Valve Manufacturers' Association existed among British manufacturers of vacuum tubes to regulate the pricing, electrode structure, and part numbering system for its members.
- The International Steel Agreement, a cartel founded by Germany, France, Belgium, and Luxembourg in 1926 that was in effect until 1939.
- The International Mercury Cartel (1928–1954) between Italy and Spain.
- The European Timber Exporters Convention (ETEC), formed by several European timber producers.
- The tin cartel, created in the late 1920s by Bolivia and Nigeria.
- The International Sugar Agreements, the first of which was finalized in 1937.
- The petroleum industry has historically been characterized by several cartels. The 1928 Achnacarry Agreement set production quotas for petroleum. The Seven Sisters was the name for the consortium of seven transnational oil companies which dominated the global petroleum industry from the 1940s to the 1970s. The contemporary equivalent is OPEC, an international organization of petroleum producing nations that sets production targets and prices among its members.
- International shipping has been characterized as a cartel through shipping conferences where actors issue price lists, quotas on cargo and sailings, and restrictions on where actors can make port.
- The Swiss Cheese Union, an industry organization of cheese producers, functioned as a cartel through the extent of its control on cheese production in the 20th century.
- The coffee industry has been characterized by substantial cartelization involving two historically dominant producers, Brazil and Colombia. The two countries colluded in the early 20th century.
- The International Tea Agreements of 1930 and 1933, as well as the International Tea Restriction Scheme (1932-1937), were intended to reduce tea output.
- The copper industry had at least two prominent cartels: (1) The International Copper Cartel from 1935 to 1939, of which the members were the Rhokana Corporation (UK), Mufulira Copper Mines (UK), Roan Antelope Copper Mines (UK), Union Miniere du Haut Katan (Belgium), Braden Copper Company (USA), Anaconda Copper Mines (USA), Compagnie du Mines de Bor (France), and Rio Tinto (UK), and (2) the Intergovernmental Council of Copper Exporting Countries (CIPEC).
- The aluminium industry was characterized by substantial cartelization from the start of the 20th century to 1980. The first aluminium cartel was the Aluminium Association, founded in 1901.
- The International Bauxite Association, which was credited with tripling the price of bauxite.
- Between 1995 and 2004, several of the largest elevator manufacturers operated a market-rigging cartel, including ThyssenKrupp, Kone, and Otis, which were fined by the European Union in 2007.
- The Federation of Quebec Maple Syrup Producers, a government-sanctioned private organization that regulates the production and marketing of maple syrup in Quebec.

== See also ==
- Cartel seat (monument)
- Conspiracy
- Drug cartel
- Industrial organisation
- Corporate group
- Corporate synergy

== Bibliography ==
- Connor, John M.: Private international cartels. Effectiveness, welfare, and anti-cartel enforcement. Purdue University. West Lafayette, Indiana 2003.
- Fear, Jeffrey R.: Cartels. In: Geoffrey Jones; Jonathan Zeitlin (ed.): The Oxford handbook of business history. Oxford: Univ. Press, 2007, p. 268–293.
- Freyer, Tony A.: Antitrust and global capitalism 1930–2004, New York 2006.
- Hexner, Ervin, The International Steel Cartel, Chapel Hill 1943.
- Kleinwächter, Friedrich, Die Kartelle. Ein Beitrag zur Frage der Organization der Volkswirtschaft, Innsbruck 1883.
- Levenstein, Margaret C. and Valerie Y. Suslow. "What Determines Cartel Success?" Journal of Economic Literature 64 (March 2006): 43–95.online
- Liefmann, Robert: Cartels, Concerns and Trusts, Ontario 2001 [London 1932]
- Martyniszyn, Marek, "Export Cartels: Is it Legal to Target Your Neighbour? Analysis in Light of Recent Case Law", Journal of International Economic Law 15 (1) (2012): 181–222.
- Osborne, Dale K. "Cartel problems." American Economic Review 66.5 (1976): 835–844. online
- Stigler, George J.: The extent and bases of monopoly. In: The American economic review, Vol. 32 (1942), pp. 1–22.
- Stocking, George W. and Myron W. Watkins: Cartels in Action. New York: Twentieth Century Fund (1946).
- Stocking, George W. and Myron W. Watkins: Cartels or competition? The economics of international controls by business and government. New York: Twentieth Century Fund 1948.
- Strieder, Jakob: Studien zur Geschichte kapitalistischer Organizationsformen. Monopole, Kartelle und Aktiengesellschaften im Mittelalter und zu Beginn der Neuzeit. München 1925.
- Wells, Wyatt C.: Antitrust and the Formation of the Postwar World, New York 2002.
